= National Register of Historic Places listings in Bedford County, Pennsylvania =

Location of Bedford County in Pennsylvania

This is a list of the National Register of Historic Places listings in Bedford County, Pennsylvania.

This is intended to be a complete list of the properties and districts on the National Register of Historic Places in Bedford County, Pennsylvania, United States. The locations of National Register properties and districts for which the latitude and longitude coordinates are included below, may be seen in a map.

There are 32 properties and districts listed on the National Register in the county. Three sites are further designated as National Historic Landmarks. Another 2 properties were once listed but have been removed.

This National Park Service list is complete through NPS recent listings posted January 23, 2026.

== Current listings ==
	Name on the Register	Image	Date listed	Location	City or town	Description
1	Barclay House	Barclay House	September 18, 1978 (#78002342)	230 Juliana Street; 40°00′58″N 78°30′14″W	Bedford	
2	Bedford County Alms House	Bedford County Alms House	November 3, 1988 (#88002378)	Cumberland Road, .4 miles (0.64 km) south of Bedford; 39°59′13″N 78°32′32″W	Bedford Township	
3	Bedford Historic District	Bedford Historic District	December 22, 1983 (#83004187)	Roughly bounded by East, West, and Watson Streets, and the Raystown Branch of the Juniata River; 40°01′03″N 78°30′06″W	Bedford	
4	Bedford Springs Hotel Historic District	Bedford Springs Hotel Historic District	December 20, 1984 (#84001413)	U.S. Route 220, south of Bedford; 39°59′10″N 78°31′08″W	Bedford Township	
5	Bonnet's Tavern	Bonnet's Tavern	August 1, 1979 (#79002164)	4 miles (6.4 km) west of Bedford at the junction of U.S. Route 30 and Pennsylvania Route 31; 40°02′32″N 78°33′39″W	Napier Township	
6	Bridge in Snake Spring Township	Bridge in Snake Spring Township	June 22, 1988 (#88000793)	Township Road 30 over the Raystown Branch of the Juniata River, east of Bedford; 40°00′49″N 78°28′18″W	Snake Spring Township	
7	Chalybeate Springs Hotel	Chalybeate Springs Hotel	July 18, 1985 (#85001560)	Chalybeate Road, north of Bedford; 40°01′34″N 78°28′55″W	Bedford Township	
8	Chestnut Ridge and Schellsburg Union Church and Cemetery	Chestnut Ridge and Schellsburg Union Church and Cemetery	January 12, 2005 (#04001482)	U.S. Route 30; 40°02′55″N 78°39′21″W	Napier Township	
9	The Coffee Pot	The Coffee Pot	February 24, 2005 (#05000097)	Business Route 30; 40°01′23″N 78°31′02″W	Bedford Township	
10	Defibaugh Tavern	Defibaugh Tavern	November 12, 1992 (#92001498)	Northern side of U.S. Route 30, east of Bedford; 40°01′34″N 78°27′10″W	Snake Spring Township	
11	Diehls Covered Bridge	Diehls Covered Bridge	April 10, 1980 (#80003420)	South of Schellsburg on Legislative Route 09057, east of New Buena Vista; 40°00′34″N 78°38′55″W	Harrison Township	
12	Dutch Corner Historic Agricultural District	Dutch Corner Historic Agricultural District	August 17, 2015 (#15000533)	Roughly bounded by Evitts Mountain, the Bedford Township line, the former Dunning Creek Railroad line, and the William Penn Highway; 40°06′00″N 78°27′00″W	Bedford Township	
13	East Broad Top Railroad	East Broad Top Railroad	October 15, 1966 (#66000666)	1 mile (1.6 km) west of Orbisonia on U.S. Route 522; 40°09′53″N 78°08′16″W	Broad Top Township	Extends into multiple municipalities in Huntingdon County
14	Espy House	Espy House	November 19, 1974 (#74001750)	123 Pitt Street; 40°01′10″N 78°30′11″W	Bedford	
15	Everett Historic District	Everett Historic District	May 29, 2003 (#03000492)	Roughly bounded by West 5th, Borough, and Hill Streets, River Lane, South Street, and Barndollar Avenue; 40°00′41″N 78°22′24″W	Everett	
16	Feltons Mill Covered Bridge	Feltons Mill Covered Bridge	April 10, 1980 (#80003413)	Legislative Route 05021, east of Bedford; 39°58′22″N 78°17′20″W	East Providence Township	
17	Fischtner Covered Bridge	Fischtner Covered Bridge	April 10, 1980 (#80003422)	North of Stringtown off Legislative Route 05007; 39°45′49″N 78°45′06″W	Londonderry Township	
18	Halls Mill Covered Bridge	Halls Mill Covered Bridge	April 10, 1980 (#80003418)	North of Everett on Township 528; 40°07′27″N 78°19′02″W	Hopewell Township	
19	Heirline Covered Bridge	Heirline Covered Bridge	April 10, 1980 (#80003419)	West of Bedford on Legislative Route 05097, north of Manns Choice; 40°01′00″N 78°35′37″W	Harrison and Napier Townships	
20	Hewitt Covered Bridge	Hewitt Covered Bridge	April 10, 1980 (#80003417)	Township 305 at Hewitt; 39°45′16″N 78°30′40″W	Southampton Township	
21	Jacksons Mill Covered Bridge	Jacksons Mill Covered Bridge	April 10, 1980 (#80003414)	Township 412, east of Bedford; 39°58′16″N 78°16′19″W	East Providence Township	
22	Juniata Woolen Mill and Newry Manor	Juniata Woolen Mill and Newry Manor	March 31, 1983 (#83002216)	West of Everett on Lutzville Road; 40°00′44″N 78°25′56″W	Snake Spring Township	
23	Dr. Knisley Covered Bridge	Dr. Knisley Covered Bridge	April 10, 1980 (#80003411)	Southeast of Alum Bank on Legislative Route 05098; 40°09′36″N 78°36′08″W	West St. Clair Township	
24	New Enterprise Public School	New Enterprise Public School	October 8, 1981 (#81000528)	Off Pennsylvania Route 869 at New Enterprise; 40°10′17″N 78°24′28″W	South Woodbury Township	
25	New Paris Covered Bridge	New Paris Covered Bridge	April 10, 1980 (#80003423)	1 mile (1.6 km) north of New Paris; 40°06′58″N 78°38′23″W	Napier Township	
26	Osterburg Covered Bridge	Osterburg Covered Bridge	April 10, 1980 (#80003421)	West of Osterburg on Township 757; 40°10′37″N 78°32′30″W	East St. Clair Township	
27	Russell House	Russell House	June 19, 1979 (#79002165)	203 South Juliana Street; 40°01′00″N 78°30′12″W	Bedford	
28	Ryot Covered Bridge	Ryot Covered Bridge	April 10, 1980 (#80003416)	South of Alum Bank on Township 559, northwest of Fishertown; 40°08′32″N 78°37′30″W	West St. Clair Township	
29	Schellsburg Historic District	Schellsburg Historic District	June 21, 2001 (#01000677)	Approximately centered on Pitt Street, Market and Baltimore Streets; 40°02′52″N 78°38′35″W	Schellsburg	
30	Site 36BD90	Site 36BD90	June 4, 1984 (#84003102)	On the grounds of Bedford Village; 40°02′31″N 78°30′39″W	Bedford Township	
31	Snooks Covered Bridge	Snooks Covered Bridge	April 10, 1980 (#80003412)	East of Alum Bank on Township 578; 40°10′09″N 78°34′48″W	East St. Clair Township	
32	Woodvale Historic District	Woodvale Historic District	July 24, 1992 (#92000942)	Roughly bounded by Ash, High, North, Fulton, and Broad Streets in Woodvale; 40°10′01″N 78°08′17″W	Broad Top Township	Extends into Wells Township in Fulton County and Wood Township in Huntingdon County

== Former listings ==
	Name on the Register	Image	Date listed	Date removed	Location	City or town	Description
1	Grand View Point Hotel	Grand View Point Hotel	March 8, 1997 (#97000219)	January 14, 2002	U.S. Route 30, 17 miles (27 km) west of Bedford, Juniata Township	Juniata Township	Built in 1932. Destroyed by fire on October 26, 2001.
2	McDaniels Covered Bridge	McDaniels Covered Bridge	April 10, 1980 (#80003415)	October 13, 1988	Address Restricted	East Providence Township and West Providence Township	Destroyed by fire on April 3, 1988.

== See also ==
- List of National Historic Landmarks in Pennsylvania
- National Register of Historic Places listings in Pennsylvania
- List of Pennsylvania state historical markers in Bedford County
