= Almshouse (disambiguation) =

An almshouse is charitable housing that is provided to enable people to live in a particular community.

Specific places named Almshouse include:

- Greene County Almshouse, Carrollton, Illinois
- Carroll County Almshouse and Farm, Westminster, Maryland
- Almshouse (Cambridge, Massachusetts)
- Rockland Almshouse, Rockland, Massachusetts
- Almshouse (Stoneham, Massachusetts)
- Poughkeepsie Almshouse and City Infirmary, Poughkeepsie, New York
- Bedford County Alms House, Pennsylvania
- Almshouse Farm at Machipongo, Machipongo, Virginia
- The Almshouse (Richmond, Virginia)

== See also ==
- List of almshouses in the United Kingdom
