= List of Pennsylvania state historical markers in Bedford County =

Location of Bedford County in Pennsylvania

This is a list of the Pennsylvania state historical markers in Bedford County.

This is intended to be a complete list of the official state historical markers placed in Bedford County, Pennsylvania by the Pennsylvania Historical and Museum Commission (PHMC). The locations of the historical markers, as well as the latitude and longitude coordinates as provided by the PHMC's database, are included below when available. There are 31 historical markers located in Bedford County.

== Historical markers ==
Marker title	Image	Date dedicated	Location	Marker type	Topics
Anderson House		June 25, 1951	E. Pitt St. between Juliana & Richard Sts., Bedford; 40.01912°N 78.50235°W	City	Buildings, Business & Industry, Houses & Homesteads
Bedford County		October 17, 1982	Courthouse, S. Juliana & Penn Sts., Bedford; 40.01752°N 78.50367°W	City	Forts, French & Indian War, Government & Politics, Government & Politics 18th Century, Roads
Bedford Springs		June 4, 1947	Business U.S. 220, Bedford Springs; 39.9963°N 78.50683°W	Roadside	Business & Industry, Cities & Towns, Government & Politics 19th Century, Medicine & Science
Bedford Village		n/a	Old main highways leading into Bedford; 40.01862°N 78.49145°W	Roadside	Early Settlement, Forts, French & Indian War, George Washington, Military, Whiskey Rebellion
Benjamin Walker Homestead		May 13, 2006	407 Rainbow Dr., Alum Bank, PA 15521, 1.5 mi. N of Pleasantville - Rt. 56 onto Beutman Rd., .5 mi. N to location	Roadside	African American, Civil War, Underground Railroad
Bonnet Tavern		April 24, 1992	Jct. U.S. 30/Pa. 31, 4 miles W of Bedford; 40.04222°N 78.56042°W	Roadside	George Washington, Military, Inns & Taverns, Whiskey Rebellion
Capt. Phillips' Rangers Memorial		September 2, 1964	At site, Pa. 26, 2 miles NW of Saxton	Roadside	American Revolution, Military, Native American
Espy House		June 25, 1951	E. Pitt St. between Juliana & Richard Sts., Bedford; 40.0191°N 78.50288°W	City	American Revolution, George Washington, Houses & Homesteads, Military, Whiskey Rebellion
Forbes Camp		November 17, 1947	U.S. 30 W of Schellsburg; 40.04882°N 78.64787°W	Roadside	French & Indian War, Military
Forbes Road		November 17, 1947	Jct. U.S. 30 & Pa. 31, 4 miles W of Bedford; 40.04283°N 78.56°W	Roadside	French & Indian War, Roads, Transportation
Forbes Road - Washington & Bouquet Meeting		July 26, 2008	Bedford Valley Rd. (Rt. 220) between Providence Lutheran Church and Goodness Grows Landscaping, 2 miles N of Centerville	Roadside	French & Indian War, George Washington, Military, Roads
Forbes Road (Fort Juniata)		January 9, 1952	U.S. 30, 6.2 miles E of Everett; 39.99598°N 78.26857°W	Roadside	French & Indian War, Military, Roads, Transportation
Forbes Road, 1758, Fort Bedford to Fort Duquesne - Fort Bedford-Raystown (PLAQUE)		n/a	On wall at NW corner Pitt & Juliana Sts., Bedford; 40.01903°N 78.50425°W	Plaque	Forts, French & Indian War, Military, Roads
Forbes Road, 1758, Fort Bedford to Fort Duquesne - Fort Dewart McLeans' Encampment (PLAQUE)		n/a	US 30, opposite old shot factory at curve at bottom of hill leading to Ship Hotel, just E of Somerset Co. line (MISSING)	Plaque	Forts, French & Indian War, Military, Roads
Forbes Road, 1758, Fort Bedford to Fort Duquesne - Shawnee Cabins Encampment (PLAQUE)		n/a	US 30 at W edge Schellsburg; 40.0488°N 78.64765°W	Plaque	French & Indian War, Military, Roads
Forbes Road, 1758, Fort Bedford to Fort Duquesne - The Forks (PLAQUE)		n/a	Junction US 30 & PA 31, 4 miles W of Bedford; 40.04285°N 78.55983°W	Plaque	French & Indian War, Military, Roads
Fort Bedford		October 6, 1972	U.S. 30 near site in Bedford; 40.201017°N 78.50467°W	Roadside	Forts, French & Indian War, Military
Fraser Tavern		March 1, 1952	NE corner E. Pitt & Richard Sts., Bedford; 40.0192°N 78.50162°W	City	Buildings, Business & Industry, George Washington, Inns & Taverns
Gettysburg campaign		June 29, 1963	SR 1005 (former Pa. 36 & LR 286) 5 miles S of Loysburg; 40.1009°N 78.38953°W	Roadside	Civil War, Military
King's House		March 1, 1951	E. Pitt St. between Juliana & Richard Sts., Bedford; 40.01903°N 78.5034°W	City	French & Indian War, Houses & Homesteads, Military
Old Log Church		September 1, 1974	Lincoln Hwy. (US 30), near Cemetery Rd., just W of Schellsburg; 40.04932°N 78.65545°W	Roadside	Buildings, Religion
Pennsylvania		January 18, 1949	Pa. 96, 1000 ft. from state line	Roadside	Government & Politics, Government & Politics 17th Century, William Penn
Pennsylvania		January 18, 1949	U.S. 220, 1650 feet from state line 39.72573°N 78.70965°W	Roadside	Government & Politics, Government & Politics 17th Century, William Penn
Pennsylvania Turnpike		n/a	South Midway Service Plaza, just W of Turnpike Exit 11, Bedford; 40.03022°N 78.49312°W	Roadside	Government & Politics 20th Century, Roads, Transportation
Pennsylvania Turnpike		n/a	North Midway Service Plaza just W of Turnpike exit 11, Bedford; 40.03062°N 78.49203°W	Roadside	Government & Politics 20th Century, Roads, Transportation
Phillips' Rangers		February 25, 1966	Pa. 26, 2 miles NW of Saxton	Roadside	American Revolution, Military, Native American
Rural Electrification		March 1, 1989	Pa. 869 at New Enterprise; 40.01715°N 78.48547°W	Roadside	Business & Industry, Electricity
Rural Electrification		June 2, 1989	E Pitt St. / Lincoln Hwy. (SR 4010 / old US 30) at Clark Bldg. & Donohue Manor Rds., .5 mile E of Bedford	Roadside	Business & Industry, Electricity
Russell House		June 25, 1951	203 S. Juliana St., Bedford (Missing)	City	Buildings, Government & Politics, Government & Politics 19th Century, Houses & Homesteads
Shawnee Cabins		November 17, 1947	US 30 near Mill Rd., W of Schellsburg; 40.04873°N 78.6476°W	Roadside	Early Settlement, Native American, Paths & Trails
The Squares		June 25, 1951	S. Juliana St. at W Penn St., Bedford; 40.01738°N 78.50358°W	Roadside	Government & Politics, Government & Politics 18th Century, William Penn

== See also ==
- List of Pennsylvania state historical markers
- National Register of Historic Places listings in Bedford County, Pennsylvania
