= Bedford Historic District (Bedford, Pennsylvania) =

Historic district in Pennsylvania, United States

- U.S. National Register of Historic Places
- U.S. Historic district
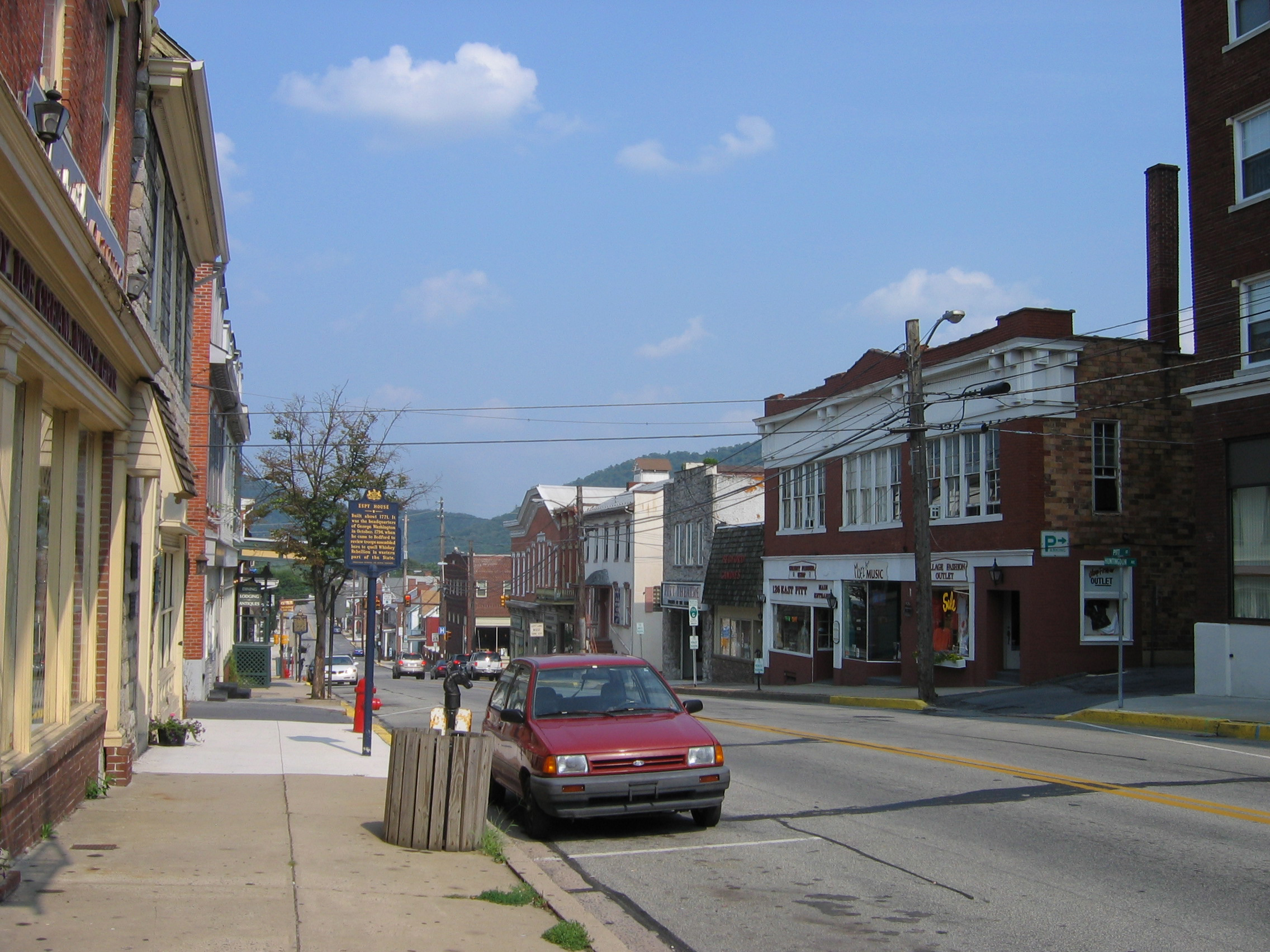
- Pitt Street, Bedford, Pennsylvania, July 2006

- Location within Pennsylvania Location within the United States
- Location: Roughly bounded by East, West, and Watson Sts., and the Raystown Branch of Juniata River, Bedford, Pennsylvania
- Coordinates: 40°01′03″N 78°29′49″W
- Area: 177 acres (72 ha)
- Architect: Solomon Filler
- Architectural style: Greek Revival, Other, Federal, Italianate
- NRHP reference No.: 83004187
- Added to NRHP: December 22, 1983

The Bedford Historic District is a national historic district located in Bedford, Bedford County, Pennsylvania. The district includes two hundred and ten contributing buildings in the central business district and surrounding residential areas of Bedford.

It was added to the National Register of Historic Places in 1983.

== History and features ==
The buildings date between 1750 and 1930, and include notable examples of Greek Revival, Italianate and Federal style architecture. Notable non-residential buildings include the oldest building in Bedford County: Fortified Bedford House (1758), Fort Bedford Museum (in the style of the 1750s ~ the building itself was constructed in 1958), Neptune House (c. 1880), G. C. Murphy Company Building (c. 1875), Arnold Building (c. 1870), Victoria House (1876), Bedford Cafe (c. 1875), Talvin Lodge (1880), Penn Bedford Hotel (1922), Ford Garage (1922), and St. Thomas the Apostle Church (c. 1817). Located in the district and listed separately are the Barclay House, Espy House, Russell House, and Chalybeate Springs Hotel.

It was added to the National Register of Historic Places in 1983.
