= Bedford Historic District =

Bedford Historic District may refer to:

- Bedford Historic District (Bedford, Ohio), listed on the National Register of Historic Places in Cuyahoga County, Ohio
- Bedford Historic District (Bedford, Pennsylvania), listed on the National Register of Historic Places in Bedford County, Pennsylvania
- Bedford Historic District (Bedford, Virginia), listed on the National Register of Historic Places in Bedford County, Virginia
- Bedford Historic District (Brooklyn), designated by the New York City Landmarks Preservation Commission on December 8, 2015
- Bedford Village Historic District, New York
