= Brush Creek (Shaffer Creek tributary) =

River in Bedford County, Pennsylvania, United States

Coordinates: 39°54′12″N 78°21′26″W

Brush Creek is a 4.7-mile-long (7.6 km) tributary of Shaffer Creek in Bedford County, Pennsylvania, in the United States.

Brush Creek and Chapman Run join near Clearville to form Shaffer Creek.

== See also ==
- List of rivers of Pennsylvania
