= Chapman Run =

Stream in Pennsylvania, United States

Coordinates: 39°54′13″N 78°21′26″W

Chapman Run is a 6.0-mile-long (9.7 km) tributary of Shaffer Creek in Bedford County, Pennsylvania, in the United States.

Chapman Run and Brush Creek join near Clearville to form Shaffer Creek.

== See also ==
- List of rivers of Pennsylvania
