= Cambridge Home for the Aged and Infirm =

- U.S. National Register of Historic Places
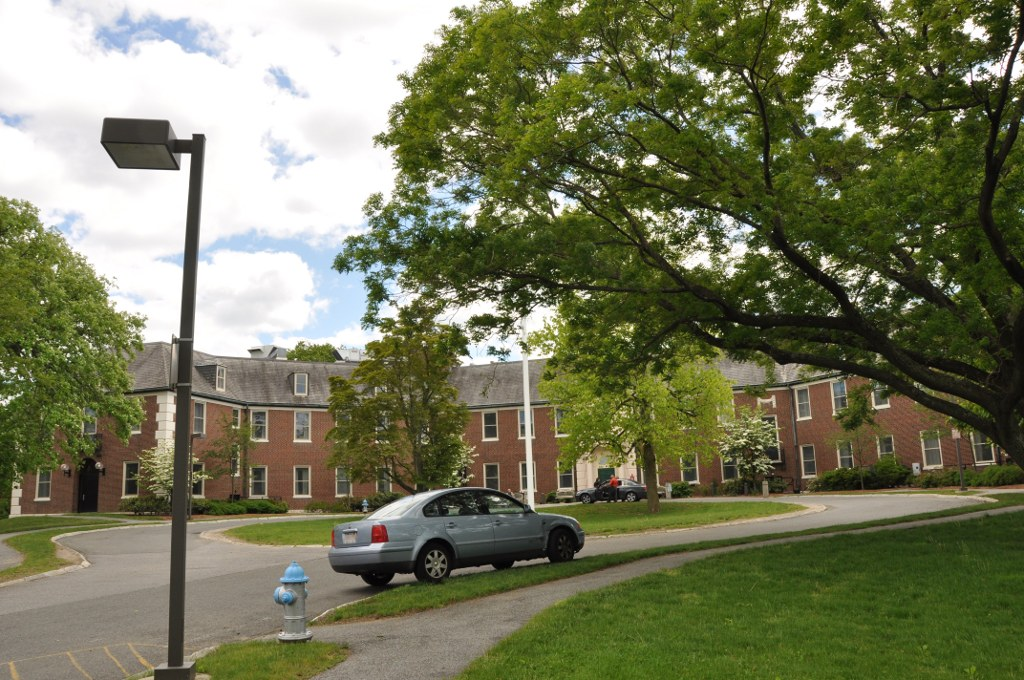

- Location within Massachusetts Location within the United States
- Location: Cambridge, Massachusetts
- Coordinates: 42°23′18.5″N 71°08′55.6″W
- Area: 2.16 acres (0.87 ha)
- Built: 1928
- Architect: Greco, Charles Reggio; Askin & Sullivan
- Architectural style: Colonial Revival
- NRHP reference No.: 02001189
- Added to NRHP: October 22, 2002

The Cambridge Home for the Aged and Infirm is an historic building on 650 Concord Avenue in Cambridge, Massachusetts. Built in 1928 by the city, it is one of the oldest surviving municipal facilities for the housing of elderly and incurably ill patients, rather than indigents. It is now operated as Neville Place, an assisted living community managed by Senior Living Residences. The building was built in 1928 by Charles Reggio Greco and added to the National Register of Historic Places in 2002.

== Description and history ==
The Cambridge Home for the Aged and Infirm is set on the south side of Concord Avenue, between it and the north shore of Fresh Pond in the western part of the city. The main building is a 2 1/2-story Georgian Revival brick structure, roughly in the shape of a W. It has a central main block, which is flanked on either side by wings that are essentially Y-shaped with a truncated stem. The frame of the structure is reinforced concrete, which is faced in brick. The main entrance is framed by a cast stone pedimented pavilion, with a keystone arch flanked by Doric columns.

The home was built in 1928 as a partial replacement for service that had previously been offered at the city's almshouse, and represents the first known instance of such a purpose-built facility in the state. The older facility had primarily been built to house able-bodied yet indigent people, and had been judged functionally obsolete as much as 15 years before this facility was built. The almshouse, known as Cambridge City Home, had been operating on this site since 1851, and suffered a fire in 1914 which damaged the building and killed three people. This facility was designed by Charles Reggio Greco, a local architect who had produced designs for other municipal facilities. It remained the city's primary support for its aged and infirm population until the advent of Medicare in the 1960s. It then underwent conversion to a nursing home, and was again adapted for use as an assisted living facility in 1984.

== Neville Center at Fresh Pond ==
640 Concord Avenue, Cambridge, MA 02138

Located in the same building complex as the Cambridge Home for the Aged and Infirm (which is now called Neville Place), the Neville Center at Fresh Pond is located at 640 Concord Avenue. The Neville Center serves as a Nursing and Rehabilitation Facility, providing both short term rehabilitation and long-term care to its residents. The Neville Center is a non-profit organization which has been in operation since 2004. This facility was nationally recognized as one of the top rehabilitation facilities in 2016.

The Neville Center primarily serves older patients, serving as both a nursing facility and a rehab facility for senior residents of Cambridge and the surrounding area. There are 112 beds in the Neville Center. The Neville Center accepts Medicare and Medicaid from its patients, and it also accepts private insurance. They are particularly proud of their Pulmonary Program, “Breathing Life, Restoring Hope”, a comprehensive and innovative approach to managing chronic lung conditions. The program is run by Dr. Robert Schiffman who is an instructor at Harvard Medical School. They use the new OmniFlow system in order to enhance the effectiveness of respiratory therapy and optimize patient comfort.

Another special program at The Neville Center is Ageless Grace. Ageless Grace is a brain fitness program which is currently being taught in all 50 states and more than 30 countries. There are 21 tools, or simple exercises, which are a part of this program. Ageless Grace works to improve the neuroplasticity of the people who practice it, by re-opening the neural pathways. These neural pathways are created from your birth until you are around the age of 21. The Ageless Grace program aims to re-open those pathways and create new ones, providing the resident of the Neville Center with the tools to work to keep their brains young.

The Neville Center's Recreation Therapy team provides therapeutic recreation activities that meet each resident's social, cognitive, physical, and spiritual needs. Therapeutic Recreation activities encourage residents into trying new things, creating new friendships, decreasing social isolation, and participating in their community.

In addition to the Neville Center, there is also an assisted-living facility across the street. Residents of that facility can end up in the center after a stay at the hospital, or spouses or partners of people who live in the assisted-living facility can also be at the Neville Center. The Neville Center highlights its food as one of its amenities, making it clear that they consider the health and wellbeing of all of their patients during their stay at the facilities. Additionally, the Neville Center has spacious rooms, in order to make their patients comfortable, and the presence of a beauty salon inside of the facility which their patients are able to go to during their stay at the Neville Center.

Neville Center's sister facility Neville Place is located next door and offers assisted living as well as a Dementia Unit. The close proximity allows for patients to move from one level of care to the next with relative ease and convenience. Both facilities are part of the Neville Communities family, a non-profit group.

Prior to its inception as The Neville Center, this building was a part of Neville Manor, which was a part of the city nursing home built in 1927 and called the Cambridge Home for the Aged and Infirm. When the site was redeveloped in 1999 and 2000, the Neville Manor site at Fresh Pond was redeveloped into Neville Place, the assisted living facility, and the Neville Center, the nursing home.

Covid hit the Neville Center hard. As of May 31, 2020, more residents had died at the Neville Center than at any other long-term care facility in Cambridge.

During the COVID-19 pandemic, The Neville Center opened an isolation facility for those recovering from the coronavirus. It began operating on Friday, December 4, 2020, and was caring for six patients by December 8. The isolation area contained 14 beds, and was part of a state program to care for patients who are no longer sick enough to be hospitalized but are not recovered enough to return home. In exchange for caring for these patients, The Neville Center was eligible to receive extra Medicaid reimbursement due to caring for patients in its isolation unit. At the time that it opened, The Neville Center's isolation unit was one of five such isolation centers in operation in the state.

In August 2023, the director of the Neville Center applied for funding from the Affordable Housing Trust to conduct repairs. However, because the Neville Center is a medical facility, not an affordable housing complex, it was not eligible for funds from the Affordable Housing Trust. It remains unknown how the Neville Center will obtain the funds for renovations and repairs. However, Neville Place is able to receive money from the Affordable Housing Trust, as 57 of the 71 units at Neville Place must go to low or moderate income residents. In May 2023, the Affordable Housing Trust approved a loan of $2.5 million to the group Neville Communities Inc., which is the nonprofit which manages the Neville community. However, those funds can only go towards the costs of running Neville Place, and not the Neville Center. Although the Affordable Housing Trust denied funds to the Neville Center, Andrew Fuqua, the director of Neville Communities Inc. kept trying to secure funds for the center, saying that the money, “would have aided basic facility repairs and upgrades, reinforcing our dedication to providing the best for our residents. Neville Center’s 5-star rating and strong occupancy rate showcase our commitment to superior care.”

== See also ==
- National Register of Historic Places listings in Cambridge, Massachusetts
