= Juniata Township, Pennsylvania =

Juniata Township is the name of some places in the U.S. state of Pennsylvania:

- Juniata Township, Bedford County, Pennsylvania
- Juniata Township, Blair County, Pennsylvania
- Juniata Township, Huntingdon County, Pennsylvania
- Juniata Township, Perry County, Pennsylvania
