= East Providence =

East Providence is the name of two places in the United States:

- East Providence Township, Pennsylvania
- East Providence, Rhode Island
