= Shaffer Creek =

Coordinates: 39°58′26″N 78°18′21″W

Shaffer Creek is an 11.4-mile-long (18.3 km) tributary of Brush Creek (Raystown Branch Juniata River) in Bedford County, Pennsylvania in the United States.

Shaffer Creek is formed by the confluence of Chapman Run and another Brush Creek (Shaffer Creek), and joins Brush Creek near Mench.

== See also ==
- List of rivers of Pennsylvania
