= Brush Creek (Raystown Branch Juniata River tributary) =

Creek in Pennsylvania

Coordinates: 40°00′20″N 78°18′31″W

Brush Creek is a 24.7-mile-long (39.8 km) tributary of the Raystown Branch Juniata River in Fulton and Bedford counties, Pennsylvania, in the United States.

Brush Creek flows down a valley between Polish Mountain and Rays Hill, and enters the Raystown Branch several miles west of Breezewood.

== Bridges ==
The Feltons Mill Covered Bridge and Jacksons Mill Covered Bridge cross Brush Creek.

== Tributaries ==
- Shaffer Creek

== See also ==
- List of rivers of Pennsylvania
