= International School of Boston =

The International School of Boston
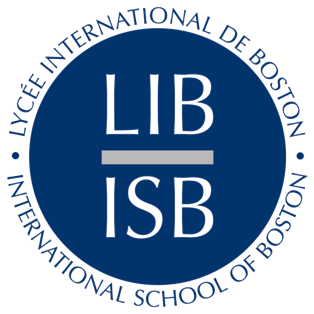

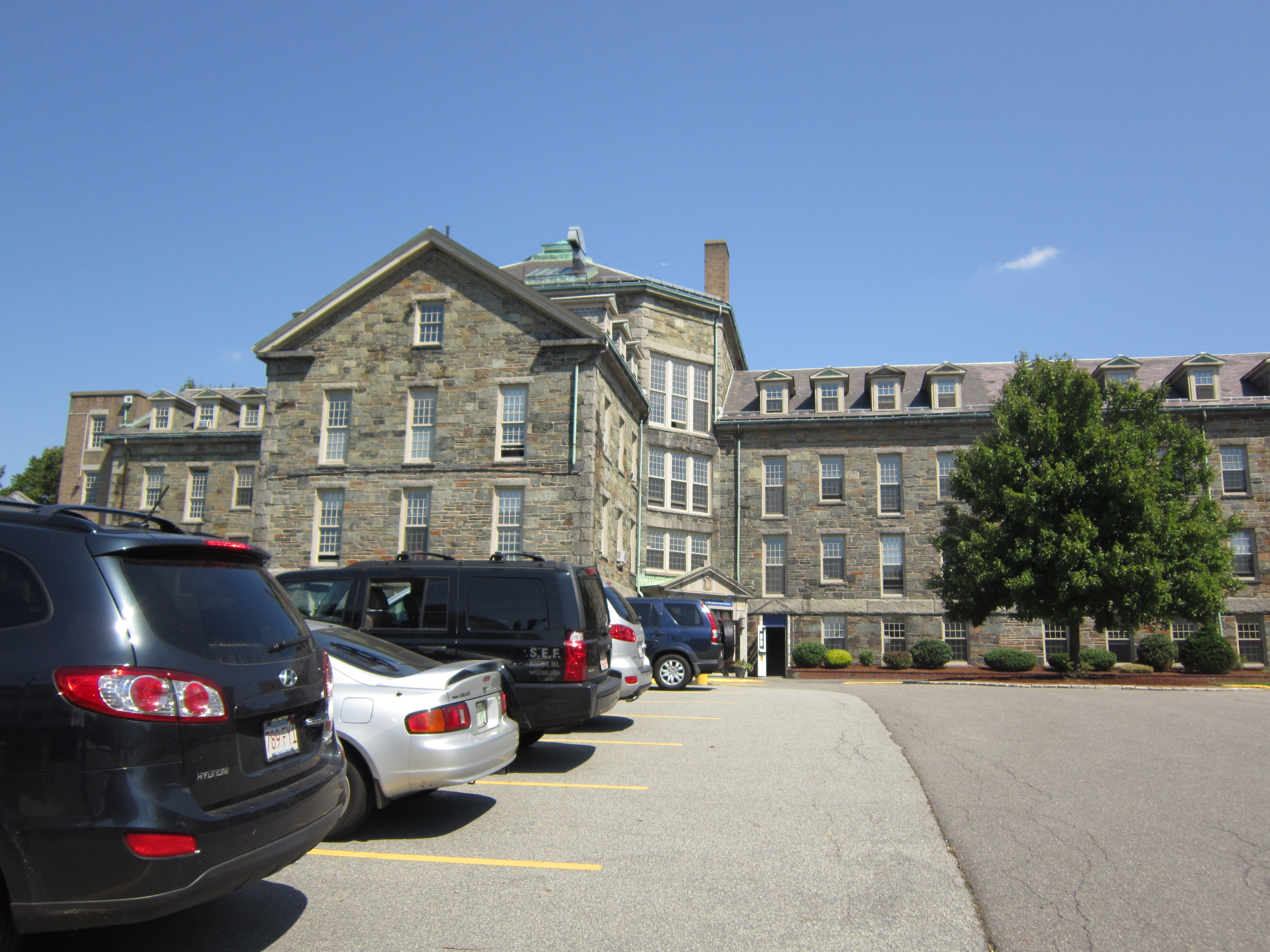
- The school in 2011

Location
- 45 Matignon Road; Greater Bostn, Cambridge; Cambridge, MA 02140; United States; 42.4025°N 71.1335°W 42.412°N 71.159°W

Information
- School type: International, Multilingual, Bilingual Private, Bilingual, Coeducational, Secular: NEASC, CIS, IBO, French Ministry of Education; Member NAIS, AFSA, AISNE
- Founded: 1962
- Administrator: Richard Ulffers, Head of School
- Grades: Toute Petite Section (Age 2) - Grade 12
- Language: French, English
- Colors: Blue, White
- Mascot: Volt the Blue Terrier
- Team name: ISB Blue Terriers
- Website: www.isbos.org

International School of Boston (ISB; French: Lycée International de Boston or LIB, previously École Internationale de Boston) is a bilingual co-educational TPS-12 private school in Cambridge, Massachusetts.

With 500 students from over 50 countries, ISB is one of the few schools in New England offering the International Baccalaureate. ISB also offers the French Baccalaureate, and all graduating seniors receive the American high school diploma in addition to one of these international diplomas.

== History ==
The International School of Boston was founded in 1962 as the Jardin d’Enfants (literally Children's Garden, French for “Kindergarten”), by Marie-Madeleine Berry (1930–2024), in hopes of integrating French language and culture into children's educational experiences. The Jardin d’Enfants was one of the first bilingual programs in the United States.

Since 1962, ISB has grown from 15 children to 500, and expanded to serve TPS through 12th grade. Students range in ages from 2 to 18 and come from 50 nations.

The school had a nomadic existence in its early years as it searched for suitable space. From the basement of the Lutheran Church in Belmont, to a church in Newton Corner, to the Armenian Church in Cambridge, to the Parmenter School on Irving Street in Arlington (where the Pre-school and Kindergarten campus has been since 1983), it finally settled in 1997 in its current location in Cambridge. Its main building is the former Cambridge Almshouse, built in 1850 and listed on the National Register of Historic Places.

It also underwent several name changes, including Ecole Bilingue de Boston (French name), and French-American International School of Boston (English name). Since January 2006, the English name has been the International School of Boston.

== Tuition ==
Tuition ranges from $29,500 for half-day preschool to $51,260 for Grades 9 through 12. Financial Aid is available. The average Financial Aid Grant is $26,000.

== See also ==
American schools in France:

- American School of Paris - An American international school in France
- American School of Grenoble
