= Saline County Poor Farm =

- U.S. National Register of Historic Places
- U.S. Historic district
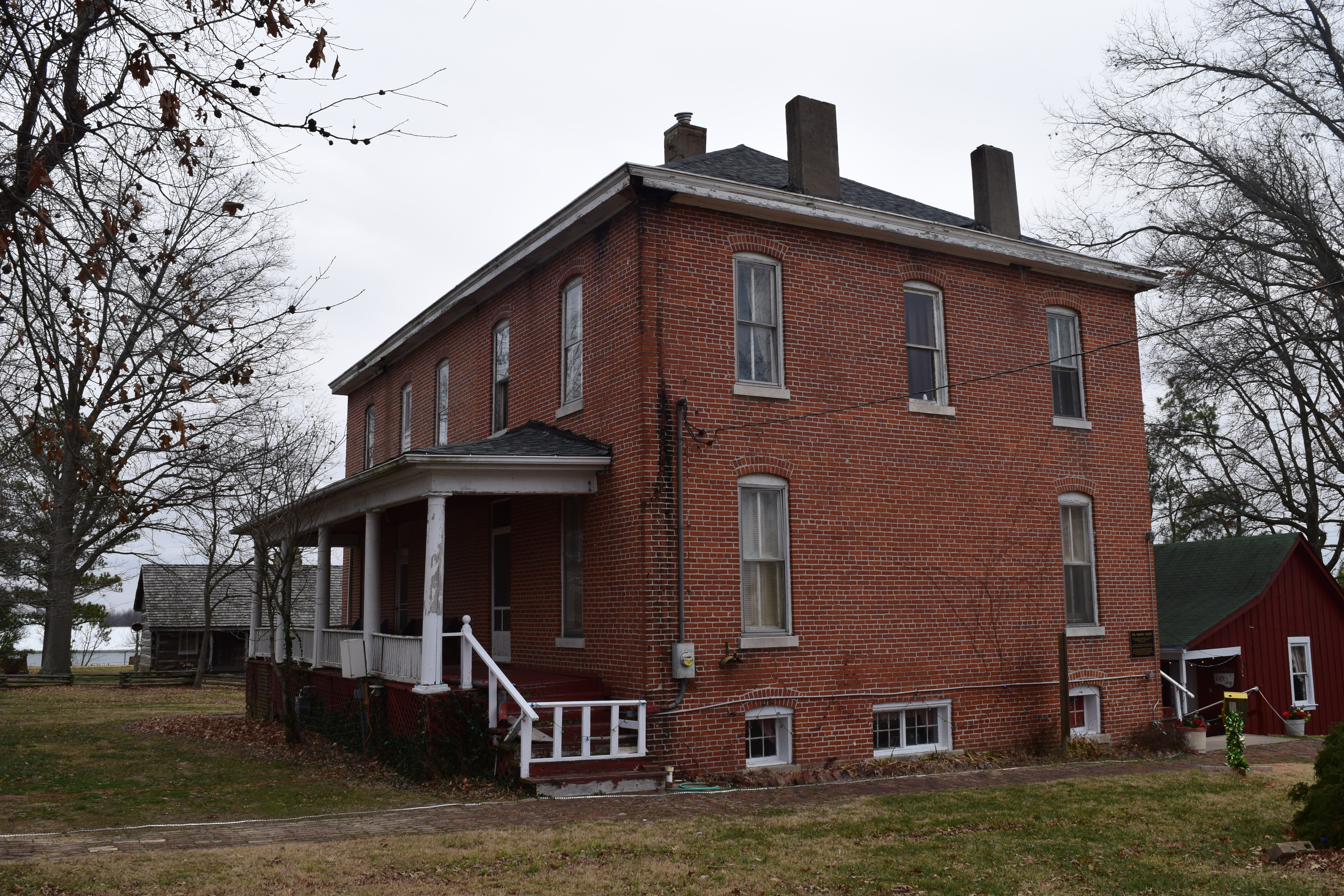
- Western and northern sides of the farmhouse

- Location within Illinois Location within the United States
- Location: 1600 Feazel Rd., Harrisburg, Illinois
- Coordinates: 37°43′8″N 88°33′8″W
- Area: 3.5 acres (1.4 ha)
- Built: 1877
- Architect: A. Winterber
- Architectural style: Italianate
- NRHP reference No.: 00001048
- Added to NRHP: January 22, 2001

The Saline County Poor Farm is a historic poor farm located at 1600 Feazel Road in Harrisburg, Illinois. The farm was founded in 1863 in accordance with an 1839 state law providing for each county to establish a poor farm or almshouse. After using a cheaply made log building to house the poor for several years, a permanent brick residence was constructed on the farm in 1877. The poor farm was designed to provide shelter for the county's impoverished residents under the condition that they work on the farm if able. During the late 1800s, this was the most common means of providing social relief for the poor in Illinois; by 1903, only two of the state's 102 counties had not established a poor farm or almshouse. However, the county poor farms frequently suffered from substandard living conditions, and the Saline County farm was no exception. According to various state reports from the early 1900s, the buildings were not maintained properly, disease and bedbugs were rampant, official oversight was lacking, and inmates often refused to work.

During the Progressive Era, popular opinion shifted to support social welfare programs rather than poor farms as the preferred means of public social support, largely due to the living conditions on the farms. This shift was reflected in Illinois law; the state allowed counties to merge their poor farms in 1917, forced poor farms to change their names to county homes in 1919, and ultimately banned counties from placing healthy individuals in poor farms in 1948. Nevertheless, the Saline County Poor Farm never merged with another county and did not officially close until the 1950s.

The poor farm was added to the National Register of Historic Places on January 22, 2001. The listing also included the county's cemetery for the poor, which was located on the same property as the poor farm.

== See also ==
- Greene County Almshouse
