= Grand View Point Hotel =

- Formerly listed on the U.S. National Register of Historic Places
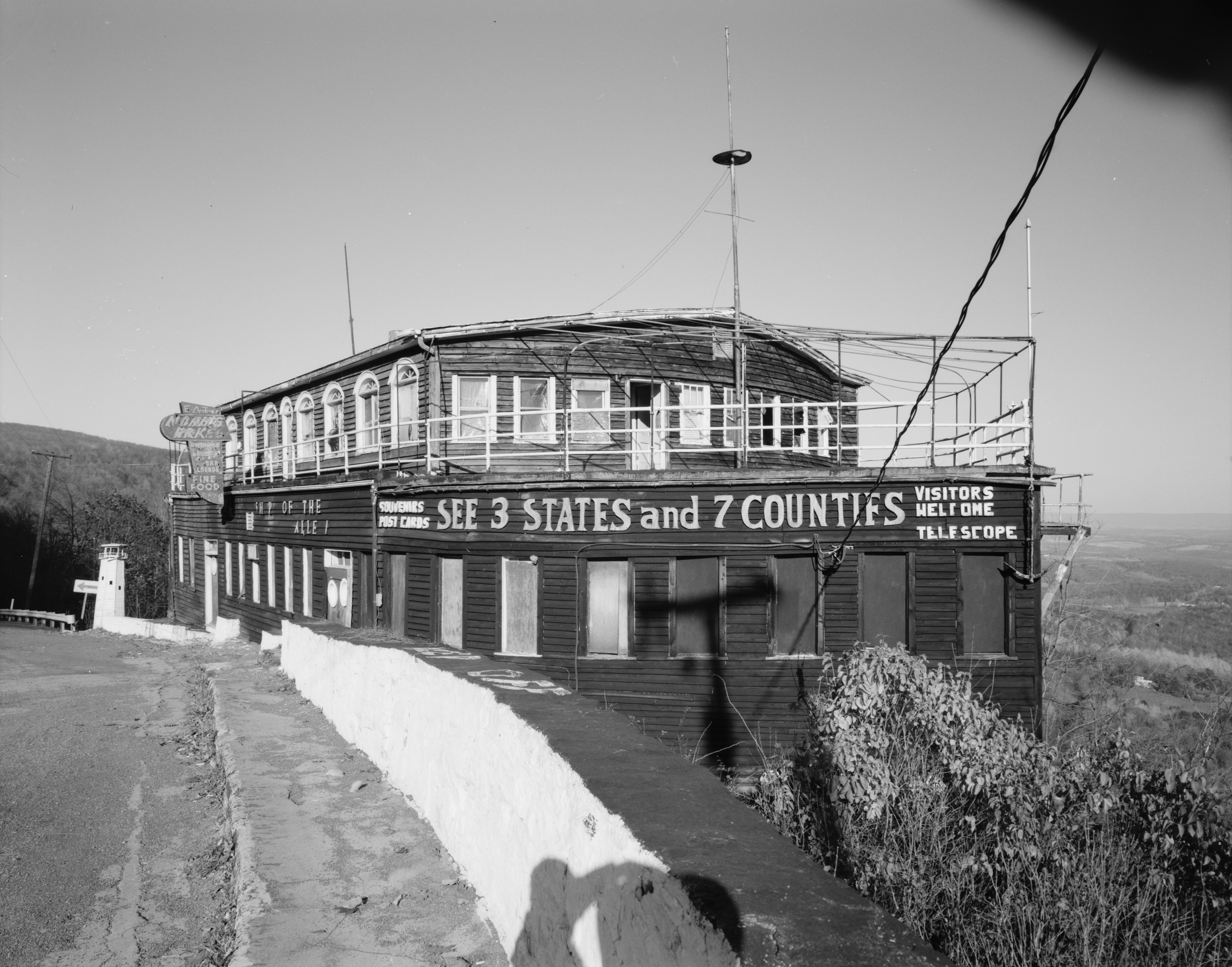
- Grand View Point Hotel, 1999

- Location within Pennsylvania Location within the United States
- Nearest city: U.S. Route 30, 17 miles (27 km) west of Bedford, Juniata Township, Pennsylvania
- Coordinates: 40°2′14.66″N 78°45′30.13″W
- Area: 1.5 acres (0.61 ha)
- Built: 1927, 1932
- Built by: Louis Franci, Emilio Rosso
- Architect: Alfred B. Sinnhuber
- Architectural style: roadside architecture
- MPS: Lincoln Highway Heritage Corridor Historic Resources: Franklin to Westmoreland Counties MPS
- NRHP reference No.: 97000219

Significant dates
- Added to NRHP: listed 1997
- Removed from NRHP: January 14, 2002

The S.S. Grand View Point Hotel, also known as the Ship Hotel or Ship of the Alleghenies, was a historic hotel and roadside attraction in Juniata Township in Bedford County, Pennsylvania, United States. It was built in 1927 as a hotel, but did not become the Ship Hotel until the additions, which gave it a ship-like appearance, were completed in 1932. The hotel was listed on the National Register of Historic Places in 1997, but after the hotel burned down in 2001, it was delisted in 2002.

== Construction ==
The hotel was built in 1927, but was not transformed into the Ship Hotel until an expansion in 1932. Louis Franci and Emilio Rosso, Italian immigrants living in Allegheny County's Turtle Creek Valley, were hired as the construction managers. Rosso was a World War I veteran who had fought in the Meuse-Argonne Offensive and the Battle of Saint-Mihiel in 1917.

Herbert Paulson, a Dutch-born man, was their supervisor and had the idea for what would become the landmark. The architect, Alfred Sinnhuber, was born in or around Berlin, Germany, and arrived in the U.S. in 1903. He often referred to himself as a "building designer" or architect and lived in Turtle Creek, but he also worked as a "checker" and lathe operator at the Westinghouse plant in East Pittsburgh. He was married to Elsa Marie Kristen, and his children joined him in the plant. Working in the Westinghouse plant was the norm for those living in Pittsburgh and its suburbs, with Franci and Rosso likely working there at some point as well. All of these individuals would work together to build the Ship Hotel expansion. Allegedly, Paulson invited Franci and Rosso on a hunting trip and proposed expanding his existing hotel into the Ship Hotel.

As local historian Brian Butko notes, Paulson chose these two men, who lived near the Westinghouse plant where he (and they likely) worked, assuming that folks living in Turtle Creek Valley "knew all about building on steep hillsides." As Sinnhuber designed the new hotel and reportedly supervised the construction, Franci and Rosso were the construction managers. Paulson, who was a tool-and-die maker at the Pittsburgh plant, reportedly told the state government: "It's my property, either you let me build it, or you buy the property!"

The construction itself began in October 1931. The ship design was chosen since fog in the valley reportedly looked like the sea. Paulson told them they had from October until May of the following year to expand the hotel, a time frame of less than eight months, mostly in cold, snowy weather. A former owner of a car dealership in the area, Walter T. Matthews, told Butko that the ship required over 63 tons of steel and cost about $125,000 to build, with the funds borrowed at 16% interest. Matthews further claimed that Franci and Rosso went broke in attempting to build the base of the hotel, having to drill down 32 feet to find rock. Additionally, the site was over 2,400 feet above sea level and 500 feet below the Allegheny Mountain summit, making it hard to build. Specifically, there was burrowing under the Lincoln Highway, or U.S. Route 30, to insert the three heavy I-beams, with embedded huge concrete piers allowing the ship to "ride." In addition to the cement and 18 steel piers, numerous carloads of lumber were used to cover the hotel's exterior with 3/4-inch-thick wood overlaid with metal siding, sourced from at least 22 junked car frames. Also, nails and 72 tons of steel, by some counts, went into the construction of the expanded 5-floor hotel, coupled with water piped from half a mile away.

While Franci and Rosso did the manual work to build the expanded hotel, they had a crew to help with the laborious construction.

== Grand opening and later years ==
After 1931, the Ship Hotel blossomed. At noon on May 29, 1932, after it was announced in the local Bedford Gazette, the ship opened, offering tours, staff inspections, and concerts. On that day, the Bedford American Legion Junior band, a local German band, and the Bedford High School band played, while a plane flew overhead dropping flowers on the ship's deck, and a stilt walker entertained guests. The hotel was described as having "one of the most significant scenic views on the North American continent," with views of the fertile rolling hills of Pennsylvania, West Virginia, and Maryland. The main claim was that you could see three states and seven counties from the ship, with no official list of what one could see from the ship itself.

As the years went by, the hotel persevered despite difficulties. The Paulson family lived aboard the ship and kept it running for many years, with Clara Paulson being the only person born on board. Day-to-day entertainment included a local comedian, a grand orchestra, and much more, even when it was snow-bound in the winters. The ship was remodeled numerous times and thrived even with the building of the PA turnpike, suffered the brunt of anti-German discrimination during World War II, and stayed busy until the 1970s when public interest in roadside attractions began to wane.

By 1954, reportedly 2 million people had visited it, filling 20 volumes of registers, including those from 62 foreign countries and possibly celebrities such as Calvin Coolidge, Henry Ford, and Thomas Edison.

Over the years, the hotel made much of its money from souvenirs and refreshments, from 1932 until Paulson died in 1973.

After 1978, the ship was turned into "Noah's Ark" by another family, the Loyas. From then on, the ship fell into disrepair, burning down in October 2001, reportedly due to lights kept on in the decaying structure to dissuade squatters.
