= Fischtner Covered Bridge =

- Fichtner Covered Bridge
- U.S. National Register of Historic Places
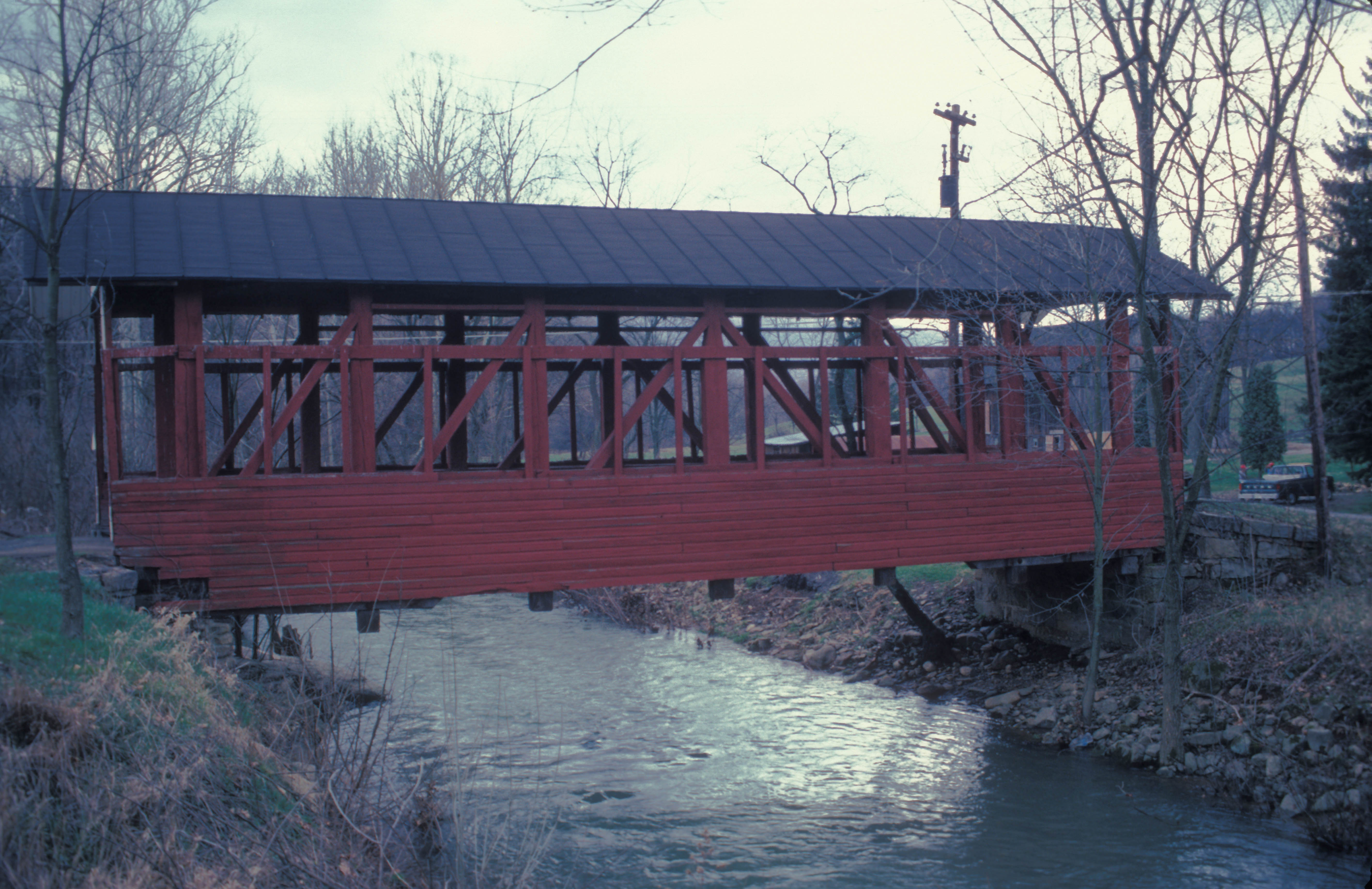

- Location within Pennsylvania Location within the United States
- Location: North of Stringtown off Legislative Route 05007, Londonderry Township, Pennsylvania
- Coordinates: 39°45′49″N 78°45′6″W
- Area: less than one acre
- MPS: Bedford County Covered Bridges TR
- NRHP reference No.: 80003422
- Added to NRHP: April 10, 1980

The Fichtner Covered Bridge, also known as Palo Alto Bridge, is a historic wooden covered bridge located at Londonderry Township in Bedford County, Pennsylvania. It is a 56-foot-long (17 m), Kingpost Truss bridge with low side walls, constructed in 1880. It crosses Gladdens Run. It is one of 15 historic covered bridges in Bedford County.

It was listed on the National Register of Historic Places in 1980.
