= Feltons Mill Covered Bridge =

- U.S. National Register of Historic Places
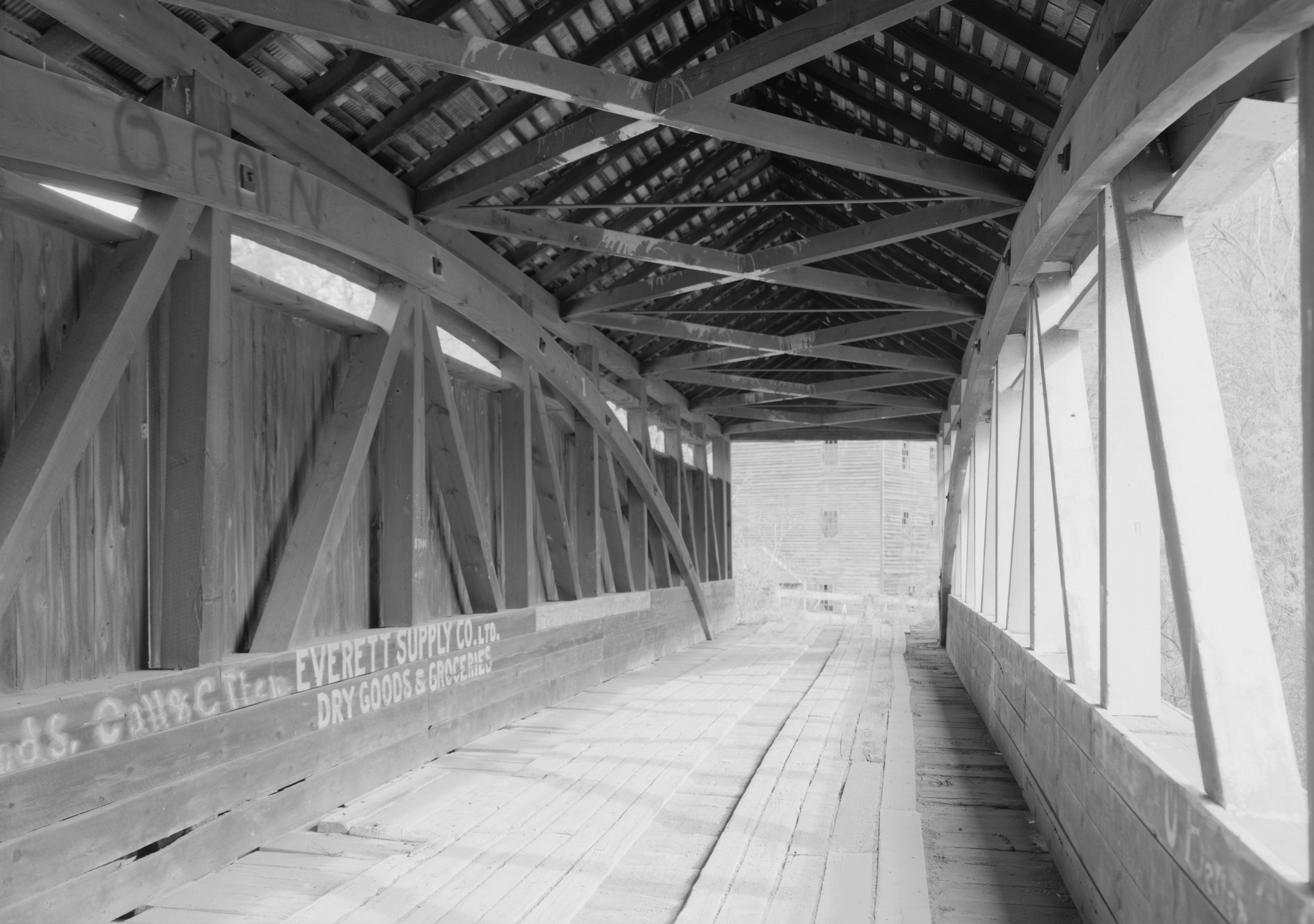
- Feltons Mill Covered Bridge, 1992

- Location within Pennsylvania Location within the United States
- Location: Township 412, east of Bedford, East Providence Township, Pennsylvania
- Coordinates: 39°58′23″N 78°17′19″W
- Area: less than one acre
- MPS: Bedford County Covered Bridges TR
- NRHP reference No.: 80003413
- Added to NRHP: April 10, 1980

The Feltons Mill Covered Bridge is a historic wooden covered bridge located at East Providence Township in Bedford County, Pennsylvania. It is a 105-foot-long (32 m), Burr Truss bridge with a medium pitched gable roof, constructed in 1892. It crosses Brush Creek. It is one of 15 historic covered bridges in Bedford County.

It was listed on the National Register of Historic Places in 1980. The bridge is in very poor condition. The sideboards on one side are completely gone which leaves the floor completely open to the elements.

== See also ==
- List of bridges documented by the Historic American Engineering Record in Pennsylvania
