= Londonderry Township, Bedford County, Pennsylvania =

Township in Pennsylvania, US

Coordinates: 39°44′30″N 78°44′29″W

- Township
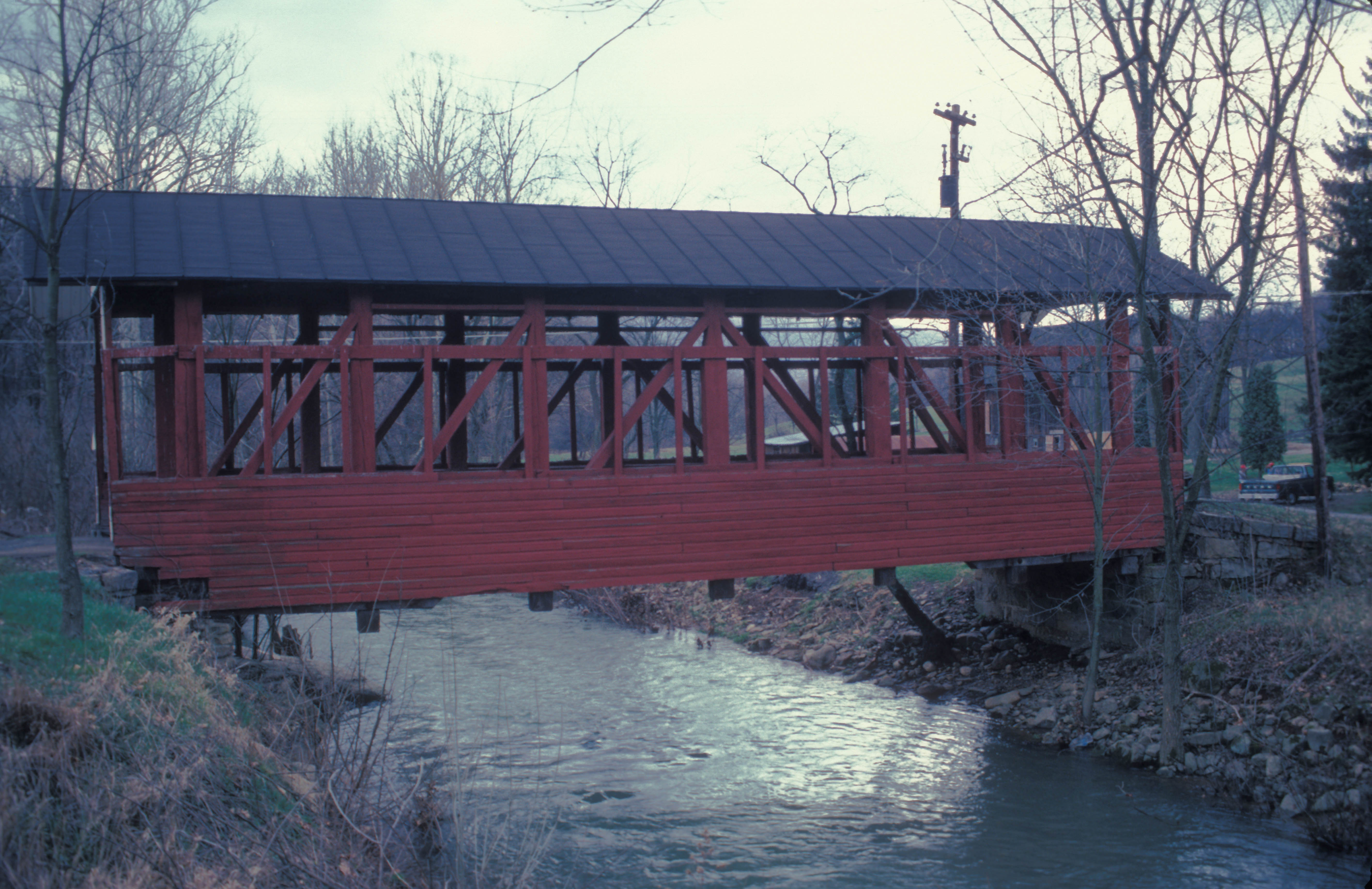
- Fischtner Covered Bridge

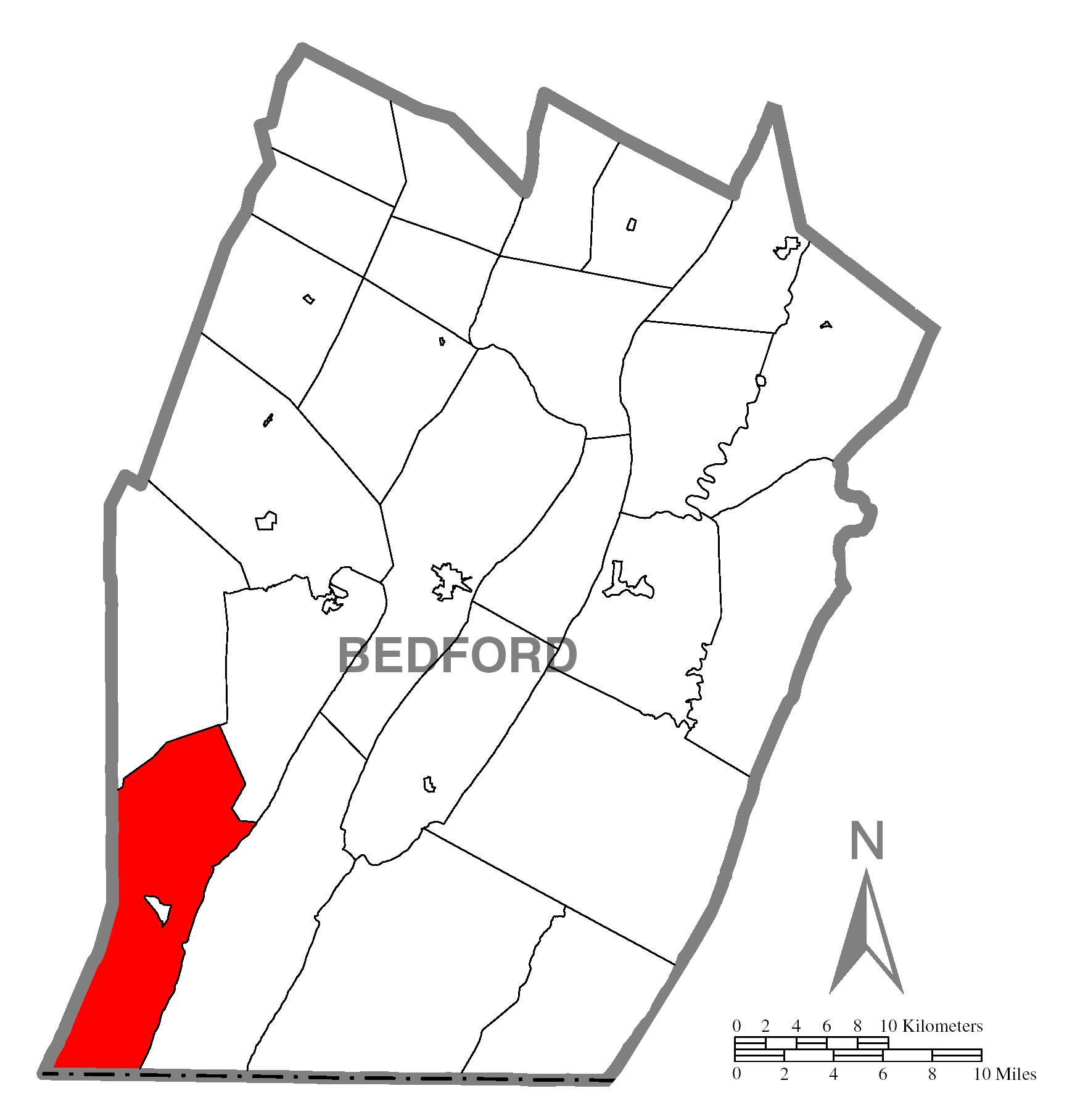
- Map of Bedford County, Pennsylvania highlighting Londonderry Township

- Map of Bedford County, Pennsylvania
- Country: United States
- State: Pennsylvania
- County: Bedford
- Settled: 1762
- Incorporated: 1785

Area
  - Total: 54.97 sq mi (142.36 km^{2})
  - Land: 54.79 sq mi (141.91 km^{2})
  - Water: 0.17 sq mi (0.45 km^{2})

Population (2020)
  - Total: 1,641 ▼
  - Estimate (2023): 1,626
  - Density: 33/sq mi (12.6/km^{2})
- Time zone: UTC-5 (Eastern (EST))
  - Summer (DST): UTC-4 (EDT)
- Area code: 814
- FIPS code: 42-009-44448

Londonderry Township is a township in Bedford County, Pennsylvania, United States. It is named after County Londonderry, now in Northern Ireland. The population was 1,641 at the 2020 census.

== History ==
The Fichtner Covered Bridge was listed on the National Register of Historic Places in 1980.

== Geography ==
Londonderry Township is located in the southwest corner of Bedford County. Its western border is the Somerset County line, and its southern border is with Allegany County, Maryland. The borough of Hyndman is completely surrounded by the township but is not part of it.

According to the United States Census Bureau, the township has a total area of 55.0 square miles (142.4 km^{2}), of which 54.8 square miles (141.9 km^{2}) is land and 0.15 square miles (0.4 km^{2}), or 0.31%, is water.

=== Adjacent municipalities ===
- Cumberland Valley Township (east)
- Harrison Township (northeast)
- Juniata Township (north)
- Southampton Township, Somerset County (southwest)
- Fairhope Township, Somerset County (west)
- Allegany County, Maryland (south)

== Recreation ==
Portions of the Pennsylvania State Game Lands Number 48 and Number 104 are located in the township.

== Demographics ==
Historical population
Census	Pop.	Note	%±
2010	1,856		—
2020	1,641		−11.6%
2023 (est.)	1,626		−0.9%
U.S. Decennial Census

As of the census of 2000, there were 1,760 people, 685 households, and 521 families residing in the township. The population density was 32.2 inhabitants per square mile (12.4/km^{2}). There were 799 housing units at an average density of 14.6 units per square mile (5.6 units/km^{2}). The racial makeup of the township was 98.98% White, 0.06% African American, 0.40% Native American, and 0.57% from two or more races. Hispanic or Latino of any race were 0.34% of the population.

There were 685 households, out of which 31.7% had children under the age of 18 living with them, 65.7% were married couples living together, 6.3% had a female householder with no husband present, and 23.8% were non-families. 21.5% of all households were made up of individuals, and 13.1% had someone living alone who was 65 years of age or older. The average household size was 2.55 and the average family size was 2.96.

In the township the population was spread out, with 22.5% under the age of 18, 8.0% from 18 to 24, 26.9% from 25 to 44, 26.3% from 45 to 64, and 16.4% who were 65 years of age or older. The median age was 40 years. For every 100 females there were 102.3 males. For every 100 females age 18 and over, there were 99.4 males.

The median income for a household in the township was $31,389, and the median income for a family was $36,445. Males had a median income of $26,875 versus $18,875 for females. The per capita income for the township was $13,951. About 9.0% of families and 10.2% of the population were below the poverty line, including 12.4% of those under age 18 and 5.8% of those age 65 or over.
