= Greene County Almshouse =

- Formerly listed on the U.S. National Register of Historic Places
- U.S. Historic district
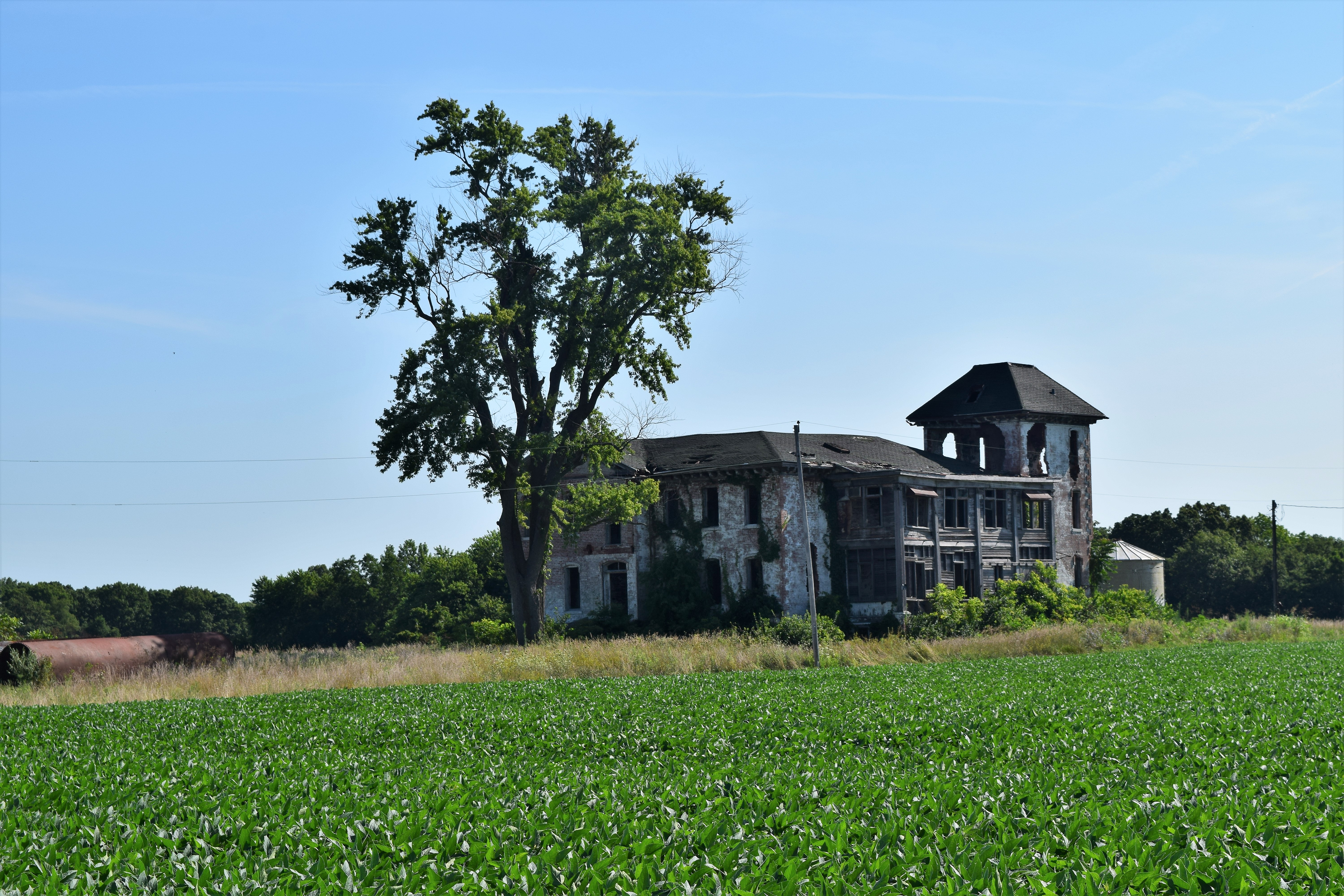

- Location within Illinois Location within the United States
- Location: Greene County, Illinois
- Nearest city: Carrollton
- Coordinates: 39°19′47.8″N 90°21′54.9″W
- Area: 5 acres (2.0 ha)
- Built: 1907
- Architectural style: Italianate
- NRHP reference No.: 91000568

Significant dates
- Added to NRHP: May 17, 1991
- Removed from NRHP: March 20, 2025

The Greene County Almshouse was a historic poorhouse located in Greene County, Illinois, along a township road northeast of the city of Carrollton. The almshouse was built in 1870 in accordance with an 1839 state law which provided for each county to establish its own almshouse or poor farm for welfare recipients. Prior to passage of the law, public welfare in Illinois had taken the form of "outdoor relief", in which the poor worked on farms in exchange for basic support. Under Illinois' county almshouse system, the poor were intended to receive shelter and necessities in the houses, often in exchange for farm labor on the property. By 1903, all but two of Illinois' counties had established an almshouse or poor farm.

Greene County established its first poor farm in 1842. The county saw a need for a larger facility in 1869, and it built the present Italianate almshouse building the following year. The new almshouse held roughly thirty residents at any given time; its population included local paupers, vagrants, the physically and mentally disabled, orphans, and the elderly. Residents at the almshouse worked on grain and livestock farms, vegetable gardens and, in later years, fruit orchards on the property. According to the State Board of Public Charities, the residents of the almshouse experienced "excellent" living conditions, in contrast to many of the state's other county poorhouses.

In the 20th century, the almshouse gradually became a home for the elderly rather than a general poorhouse. By 1910, the majority of the almshouse's residents were over 60 years old, and the proportion increased to 90% by 1928. The almshouse consequently shifted its mission to serve its newly specialized population. In 1932, Illinois formally shifted to a statewide direct welfare program which largely removed the need for the county almshouse program.

The almshouse was listed on the National Register of Historic Places on May 17, 1991.

The almshouse was subject to two acts of suspected arson activity in August 2022, which caused the majority of the remaining building to be lost. The property was subsequently removed from the National Register.

In October 2022, a group of Greene County residents petitioned the Greene County Board of Trustees to erect a memorial at the almshouse's cemetery, which was approved by the board.

== See also ==
- Saline County Poor Farm
