= Jacksons Mill Covered Bridge (Bedford County, Pennsylvania) =

- U.S. National Register of Historic Places
- Jackson's Mill Covered Bridge, 2019

- Location within Pennsylvania Location within the United States
- Location: Township 412, east of Bedford, East Providence Township, Pennsylvania
- Coordinates: 39°58′16″N 78°16′18″W
- Area: less than one acre
- MPS: Bedford County Covered Bridges TR
- NRHP reference No.: 80003414
- Added to NRHP: April 10, 1980

The Jacksons Mill Covered Bridge is a historic wooden covered bridge located at East Providence Township in Bedford County, Pennsylvania. It is a 91-foot-long (28 m), Burr Truss bridge, constructed in 1889. It crosses Brush Creek. It is one of 15 historic covered bridges in Bedford County.

It was listed on the National Register of Historic Places in 1980.

== See also ==
- List of bridges documented by the Historic American Engineering Record in Pennsylvania
