= Chestnut Ridge and Schellsburg Union Church and Cemetery =

Historic church in Pennsylvania, United States

- U.S. National Register of Historic Places
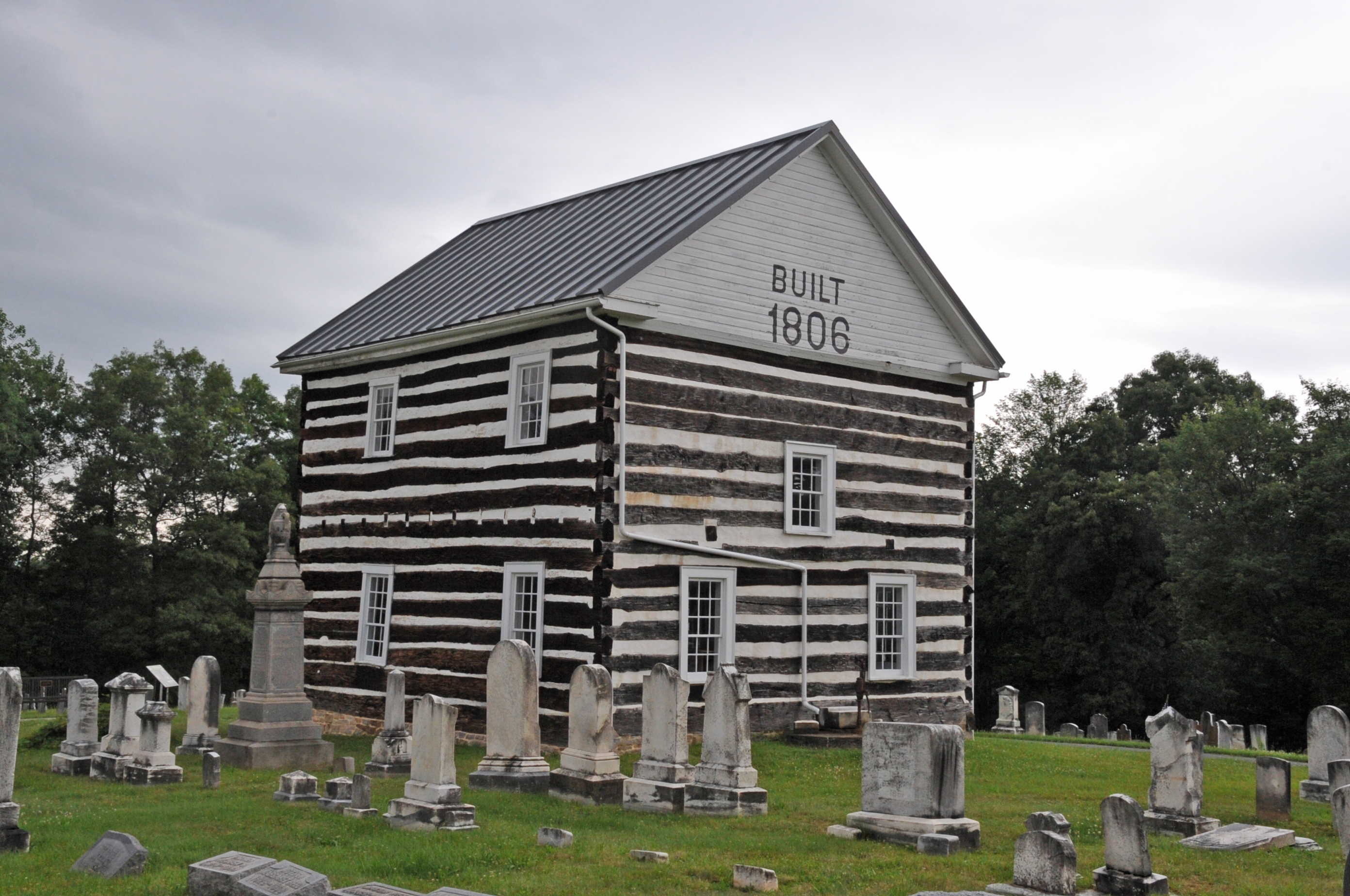

- Location within Pennsylvania Location within the United States
- Location: US 30, Napier Township, Pennsylvania
- Coordinates: 40°2′55″N 78°39′21″W
- Built: 1806
- Architectural style: log church
- NRHP reference No.: 04001482
- Added to NRHP: January 12, 2005

Chestnut Ridge and Schellsburg Union Church and Cemetery is a historic church and cemetery in Bedford County, Pennsylvania. The church was built by members of the Reformed and Lutheran churches in 1806. It was used by both congregations until 1843, and then by the Reformed congregation until 1853. The first burial in the cemetery was in 1806, while the church was being constructed. Workers who were roofing the church placed a child named Whetstone in an unmarked grave. Nevertheless, the cemetery was not formally organized until 1860, and did not receive a deed to the land until 1897.

The church was originally built of logs and, in 1881, covered with weatherboarding. The weatherboarding was removed in 1935, and the church was restored in the early 2000s.

The church and cemetery were added to the National Register of Historic Places in 2005. The small town of Schellsburg, and the Schellsburg Historic District, which is also listed on the National Register, is about 1/4 mile to the east on U.S. 30.

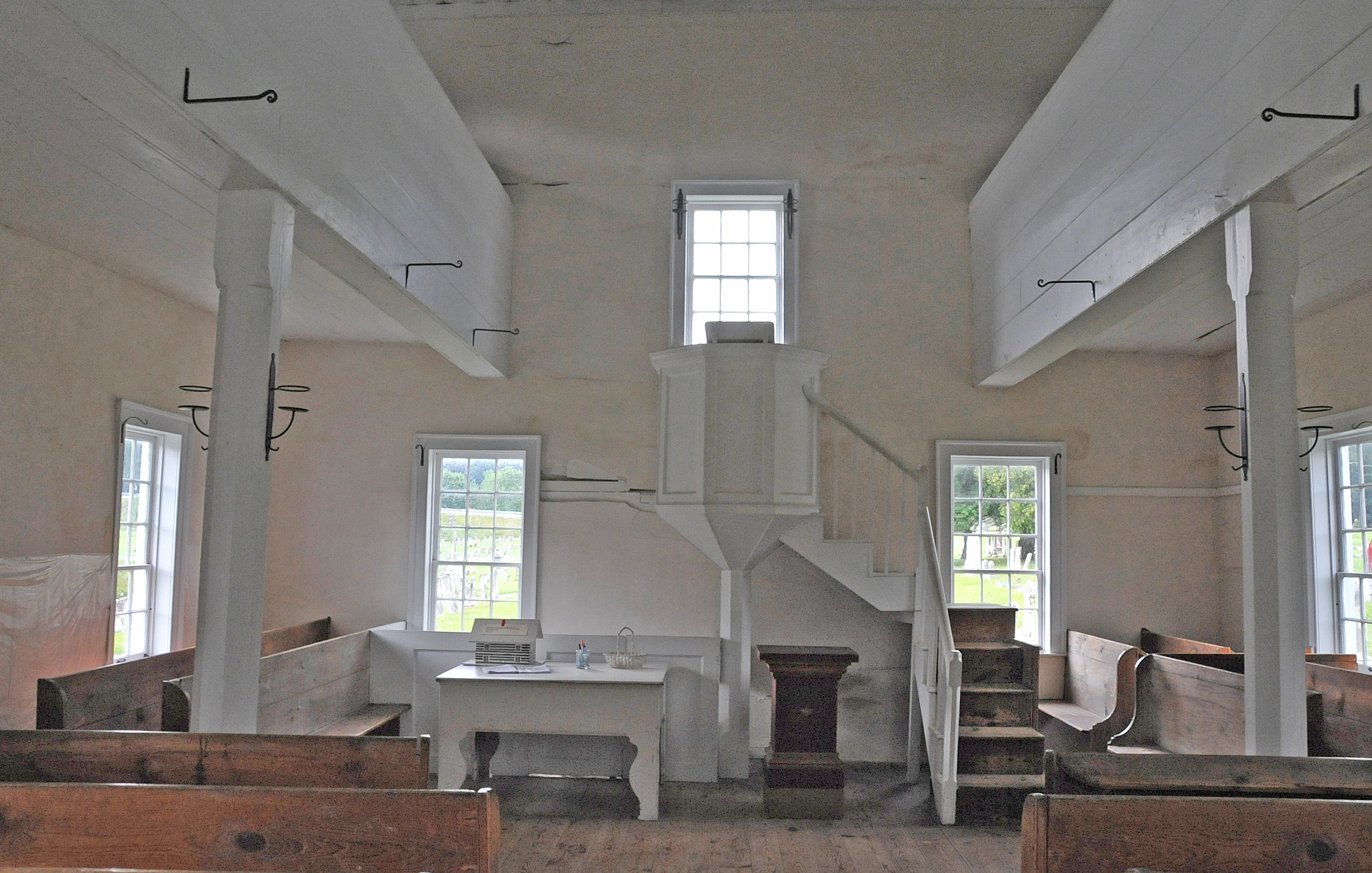
Interior

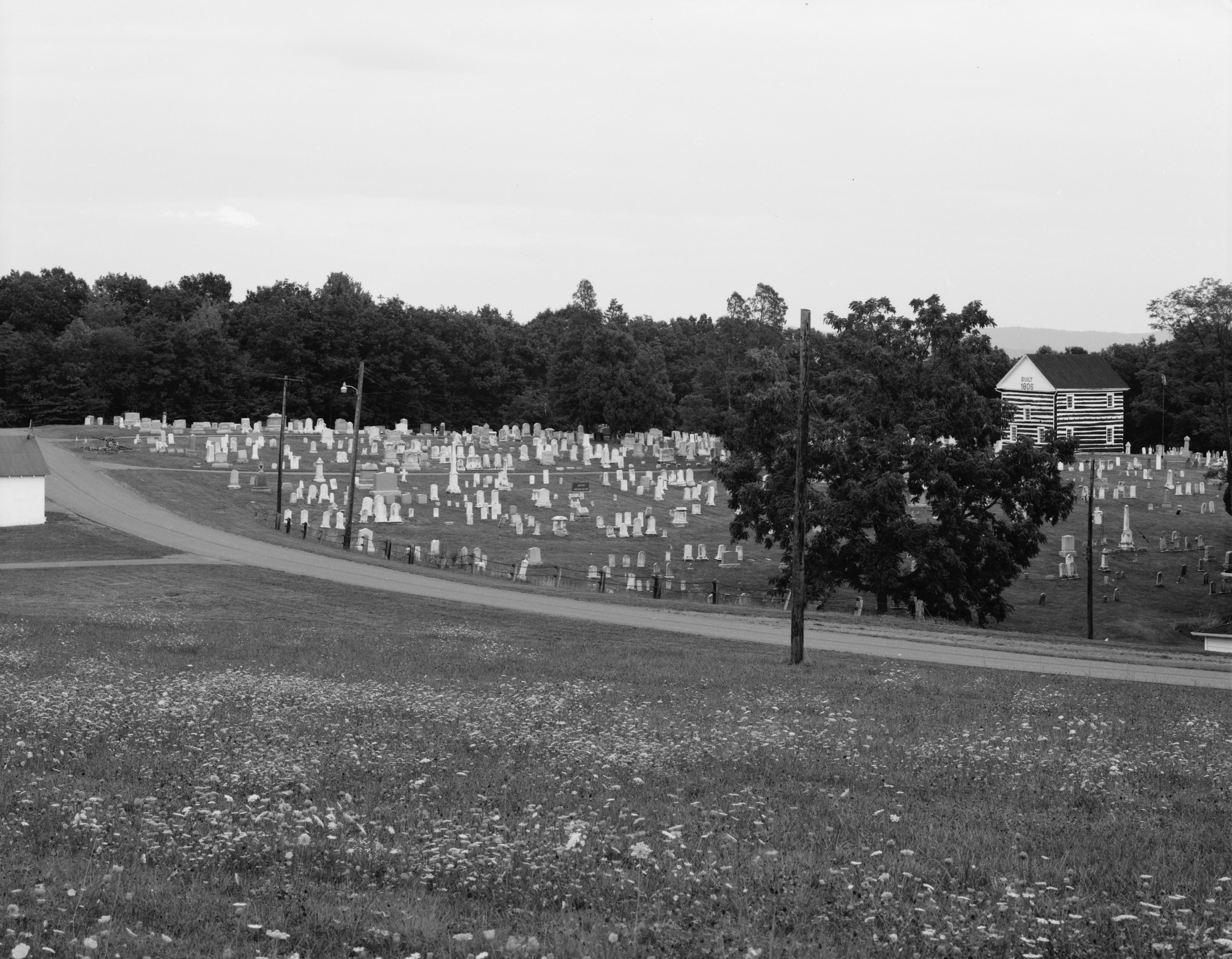
HAER, 1999

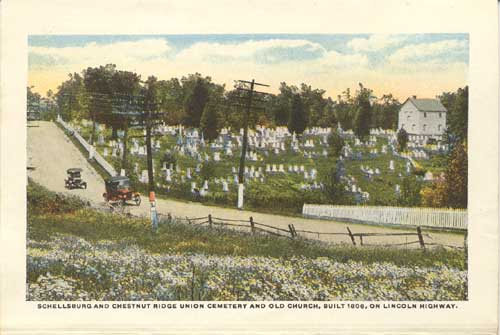
Postcard of the church in the 1920s with white weatherboarding
