= Espy House =

Historic house in Pennsylvania, United States

- U.S. National Register of Historic Places
- U.S. National Historic Landmark
- Pennsylvania state historical marker
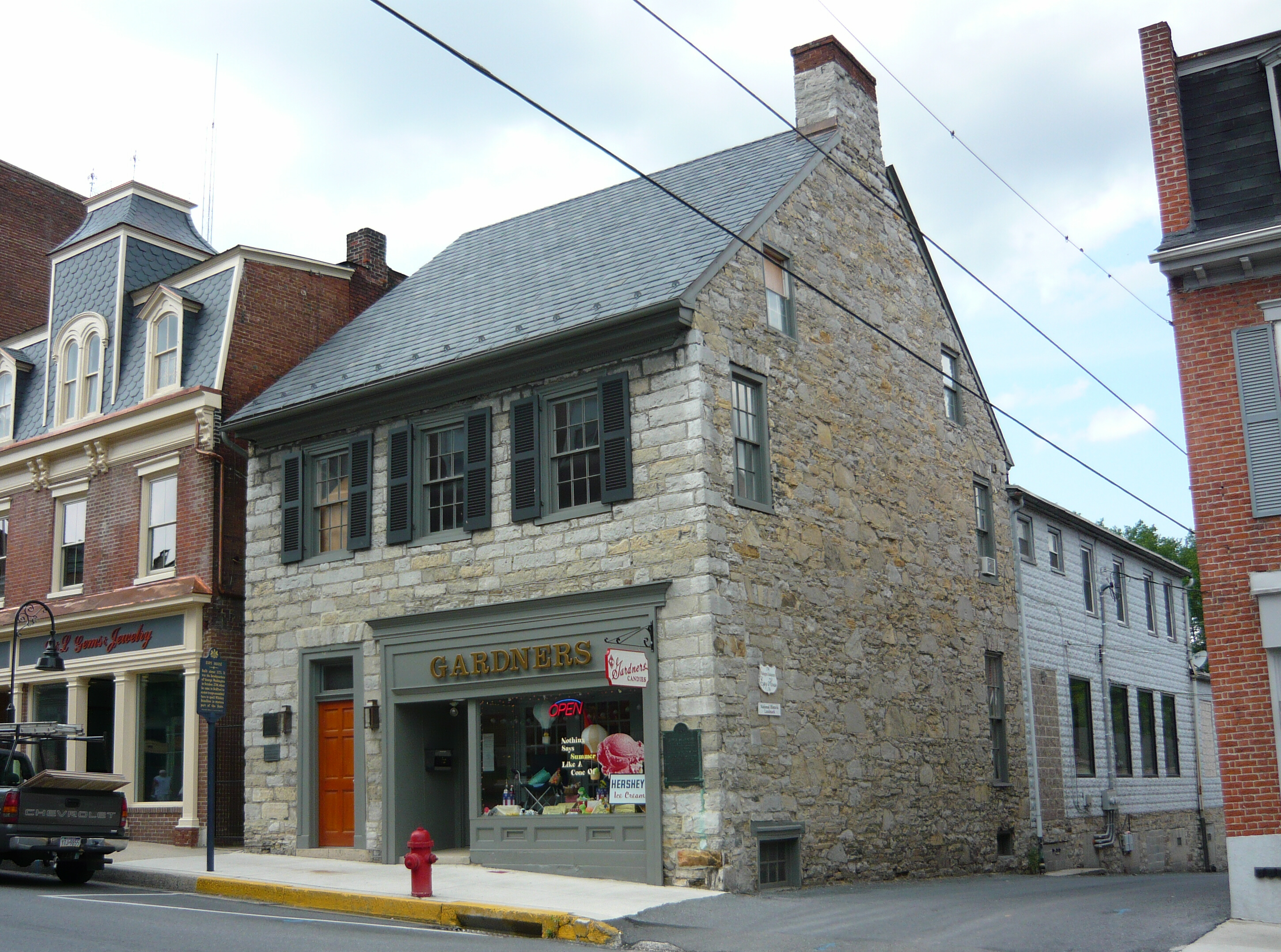

- Location within Pennsylvania Location within the United States
- Location: 123 E. Pitt St., Bedford, Pennsylvania
- Coordinates: 40°1′9″N 78°30′11″W
- Built: 1770
- NRHP reference No.: 74001750

Significant dates
- Added to NRHP: November 19, 1974
- Designated NHL: July 28, 1983
- Designated PHMC: June 25, 1951

The David Espy House is a historic house at 123 East Pitt Street in Bedford, Pennsylvania. Built in 1770, it is significant as the residence used by President George Washington when he was leading the troops that put down the Whiskey Rebellion in 1794. It was declared a National Historic Landmark in 1983. The house is now used for commercial purposes.

== Description and history ==
The David Espy House is located in downtown Bedford, on the north side of East Pitt Street between North Juliana and North Richard Streets. It is a masonry structure 2 1/2 stories in height, with a gabled roof. The front facade is finished in roughly finished rectangular blocks laid in courses, while the sides have a mortared rubble finish. The front facade is three bays in width, with the traditional entrance (now serving the upstairs) in the leftmost bay. The right two bays on the ground floor have been united into a commercial picture window and recessed entry. A wood-frame ell extends to the rear of the stone front section. The ground floor has been adapted for commercial use; the upstairs is residential.

The house was built in 1770–71 for David Espy, a local militia officer and prothonotary (court clerk). He was also a Freemason and served as Junior Warden when Bedford Lodge No. 48 A.Y.M. was warranted in 1790. In 1794, his stone house was probably the finest in the town, and was where President George Washington stayed while leading troops in the suppression of the Whiskey Rebellion. Bedford was as far as Washington traveled with the troops; he turned their command over to Henry "Lighthorse Harry" Lee and returned to Washington, DC.

== See also ==
- List of National Historic Landmarks in Pennsylvania
- National Register of Historic Places listings in Bedford County, Pennsylvania
