= Schellsburg Historic District =

Historic district in Pennsylvania, United States

- U.S. National Register of Historic Places
- U.S. Historic district
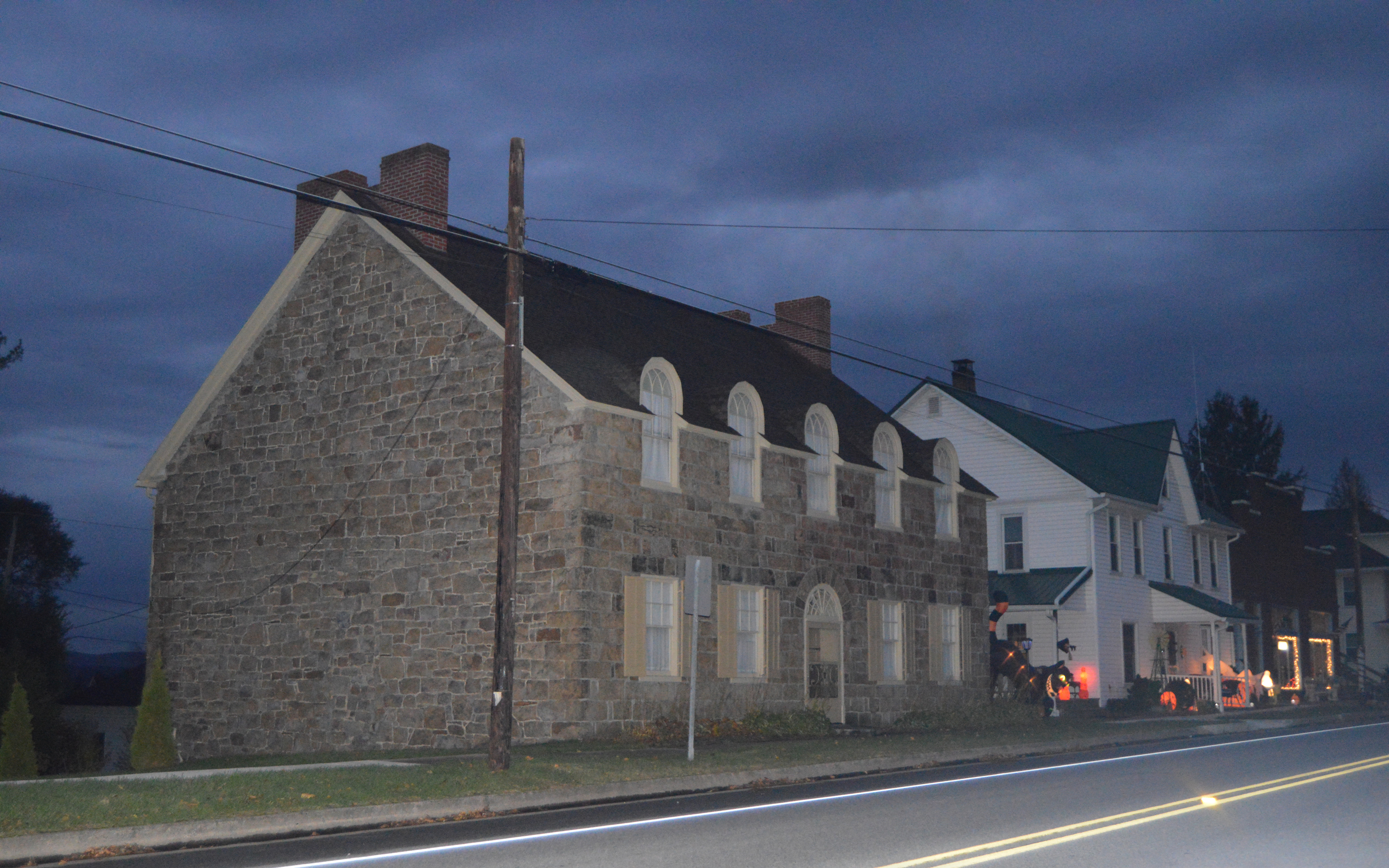
- Houses on Pitt Street

- Location within Pennsylvania Location within the United States
- Location: Approximately centered on Pitt, Market, and Baltimore Sts., Schellsburg, Pennsylvania
- Coordinates: 40°02′52″N 78°38′35″W
- Area: 46 acres (19 ha)
- Built: 1808
- Architect: Fulton, Frank J.
- Architectural style: Federal, Prairie School, et al.
- NRHP reference No.: 01000677
- Added to NRHP: June 21, 2001

The Schellsburg Historic District is a national historic district that is located in Schellsburg, Bedford County, Pennsylvania.

It was added to the National Register of Historic Places in 2001.

== History and architectural features ==
This district encompasses ninety-two contributing buildings that are located in the crossroads community of Schellsburg. They were built roughly between 1810 and 1949 and include notable examples of Prairie School and Federal-style architecture.

There are seventy-three residences, three historic churches, one former school, fifteen commercial buildings, three mixed use buildings, and fifteen barns.

This district was added to the National Register of Historic Places in 2001.
