= Chalybeate Springs Hotel =

- U.S. National Register of Historic Places
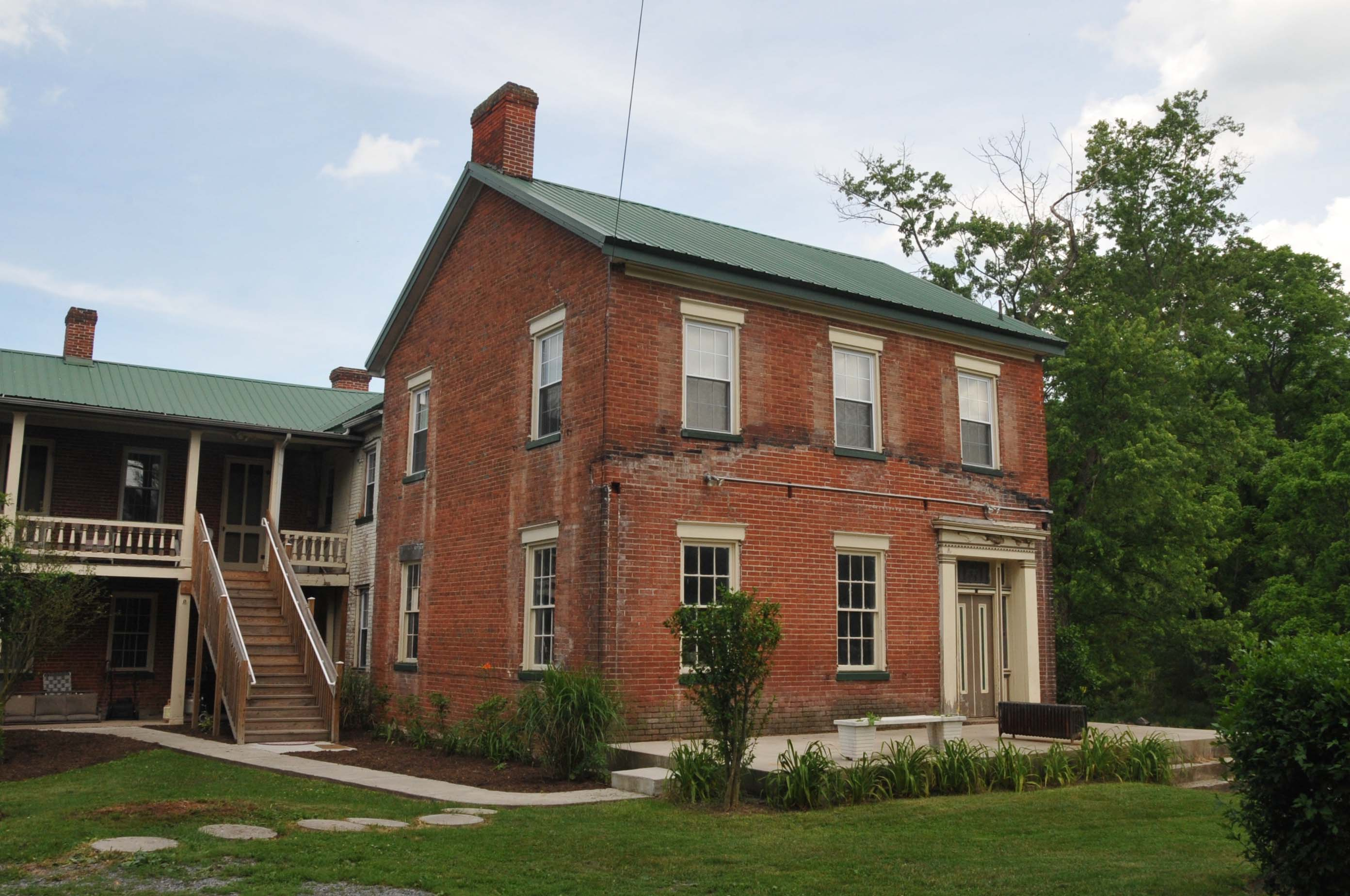

- Location within Pennsylvania Location within the United States
- Location: Chalybeate Road, north of Bedford, Bedford Township, Pennsylvania, U.S.
- Coordinates: 40°1′31″N 78°28′35″W
- Area: 5.1 acres (2.1 ha)
- Built: 1851, 1867, 1885
- Architectural style: Federal
- NRHP reference No.: 85001560
- Added to NRHP: July 18, 1985

Chalybeate Springs Hotel, also known as The Chalybeate, is a historic 19th and early-20th century resort hotel located at Bedford Township in Bedford County, Pennsylvania. It consists of the original two-story, three-bay Federal-style brick dwelling built about 1851. In 1867, the front wing of the hotel was added. It is a two-story, brick structure with front and rear porches and second story gallery porches. The L-shaped rear wing was added about 1885, and is a two-story brick structure with porches and second story gallery porches on both sides. A separate ballroom building was built in 1903. The hotel was in use until 1913. In 1946, it was restored and refurbished. It operated as a hotel until 1956, when it was converted to apartments.

It was listed on the National Register of Historic Places in 1985.

== See also ==
- Historic preservation
