= Almshouse (Cambridge, Massachusetts) =

- U.S. National Register of Historic Places
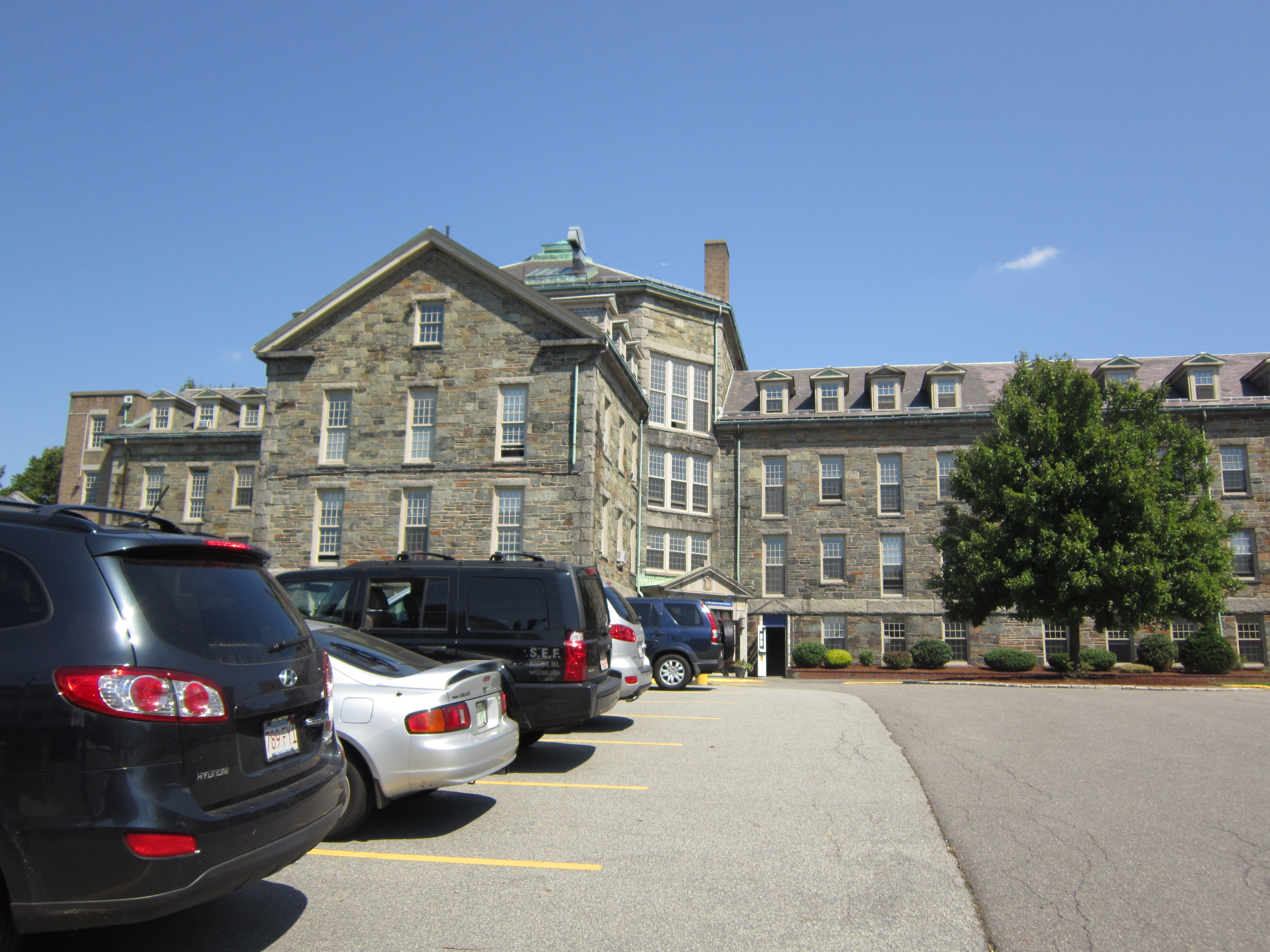

- Location within Massachusetts Location within the United States
- Location: 45 Matignon Road, Cambridge, Massachusetts
- Coordinates: 42°24′8″N 71°7′57″W
- Built: 1850
- Architect: Bryant, Gridley J. F.; Dwight, Rev. Louis
- Architectural style: Greek Revival, Italianate
- MPS: Cambridge MRA
- NRHP reference No.: 82001908
- Added to NRHP: April 13, 1982

The Almshouse is a historic almshouse located at 45 Matignon Road in Cambridge, Massachusetts. It is now the site of the International School of Boston's main campus. It was built in 1850 and is a prominent example of institutional residential architecture in stone, resembling prisons of the era. The building was added to the National Register of Historic Places in 1982, where it is incorrectly listed at 41 Orchard Street.

== Description and history ==
The former Cambridge Almshouse is located in the northwestern corner of Cambridge, on the north side of Matignon Road between Matignon High School and the St. Sava Serbian Orthodox Church. It is a large three-story stone structure with modest Greek Revival styling, set partly across the city line between Cambridge and Somerville. It has a central octagonal administrative section from which four wings of varying sizes radiate. It is built mostly out of slate blocks that were quarried from a ledge on site, with dressed dark granite corner quoining, and granite belt courses between the floors. The rooflines are pierced by rows of gabled dormers.

The building was built in 1850, designed by architect Gridley J.F. Bryant and prison reform expert Rev. Louis Dwight. A similar design was used by Bryant for Boston's Charles Street Jail (built in 1848) and for the Deer Island Jail (1850). The building was the fifth and final instance of an almshouse built by the city. It was built on a farm purchased by the city in 1849 for the purpose of establishing a poor farm. The property was sold to the Roman Catholic Archdiocese of Boston in 1927, which operated a school and convent on the premises. (The archdiocese continues to operate Matignon High School, but sold the adjacent church, now St. Sava, in 2006.)

== See also ==
- National Register of Historic Places listings in Cambridge, Massachusetts
- National Register of Historic Places listings in Somerville, Massachusetts
