= Barclay House (Bedford, Pennsylvania) =

Historic house in Pennsylvania, United States

- U.S. National Register of Historic Places
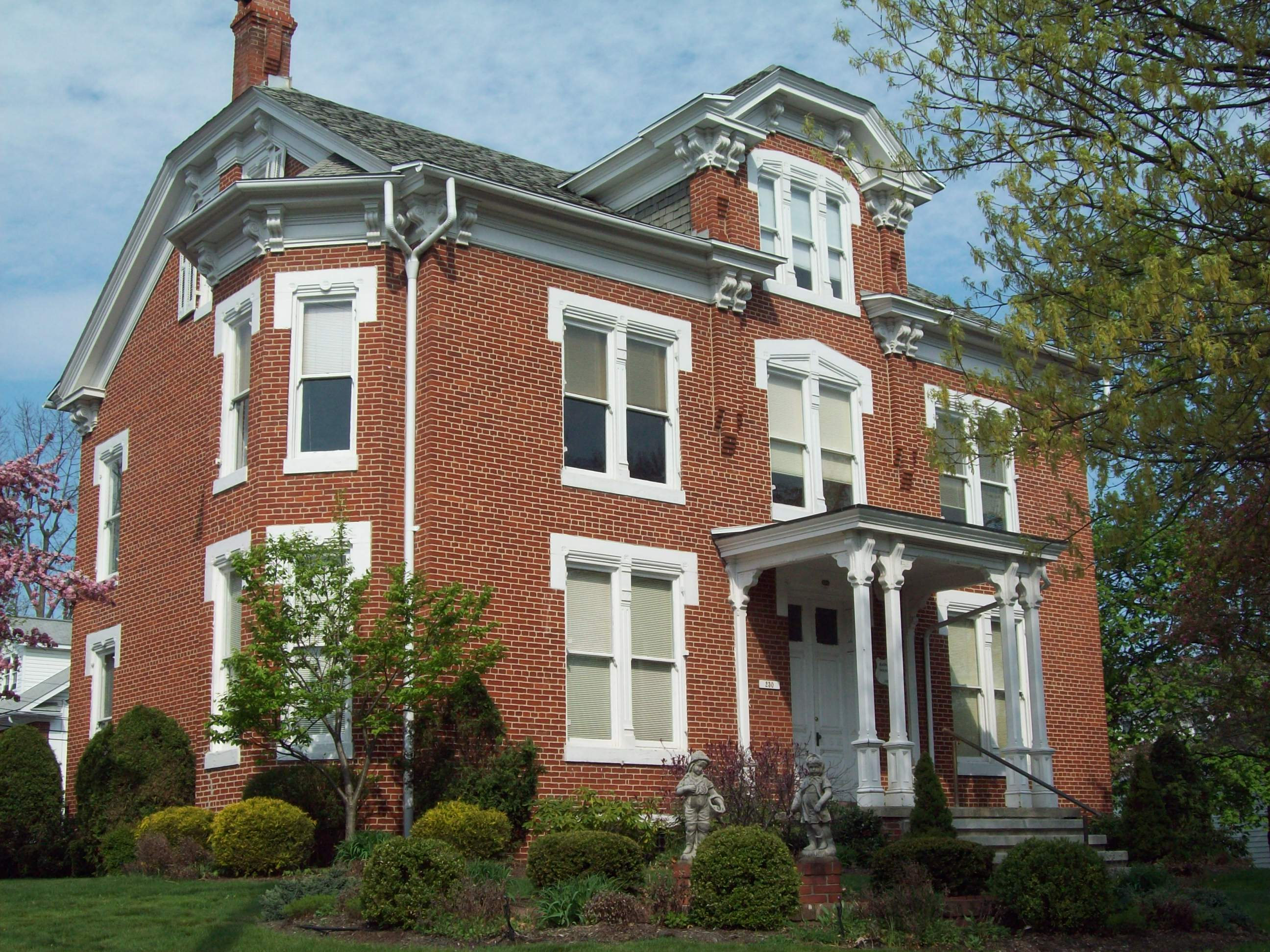
- Barclay House, April 2010

- Location within Pennsylvania Location within the United States
- Location: 230 Juliana St., Bedford, Pennsylvania
- Coordinates: 40°0′57″N 78°30′16″W
- Area: 0.7 acres (0.28 ha)
- Built: 1889
- Architectural style: Gothic, Italianate
- NRHP reference No.: 78002342
- Added to NRHP: September 18, 1978

Barclay House, also known as the Bedford Mansion or Barclay Mansion, is a historic home located at Bedford in Bedford County, Pennsylvania. It was built in 1889 and is a 2 1/2-story, brick dwelling with Gothic and Italianate style details and a jerkin-head gable roof. It once housed the Bedford County Public Library. It is the current location of the Bedford Fine Art Gallery which features 19th century art.

It was listed on the National Register of Historic Places in 1978.
