= East Providence Township, Bedford County, Pennsylvania =

Township in Pennsylvania, US

Coordinates: 39°56′00″N 78°16′02″W

East Providence Township, Pennsylvania
- Township
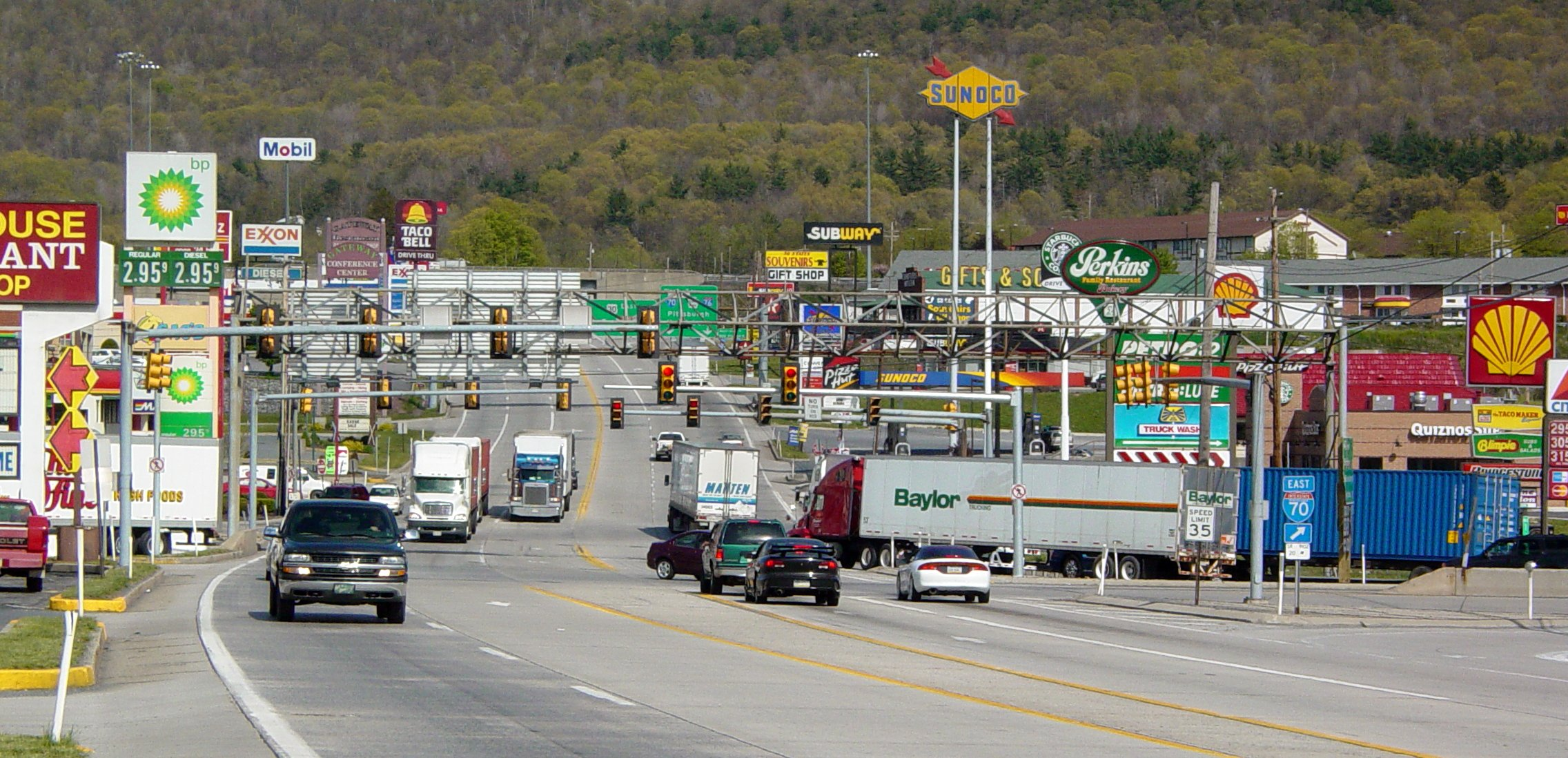
- The short stretch of U.S. Route 30 in Breezewood is one of the few gaps where a portion of I-70 built as a non-tolled interstate highway.

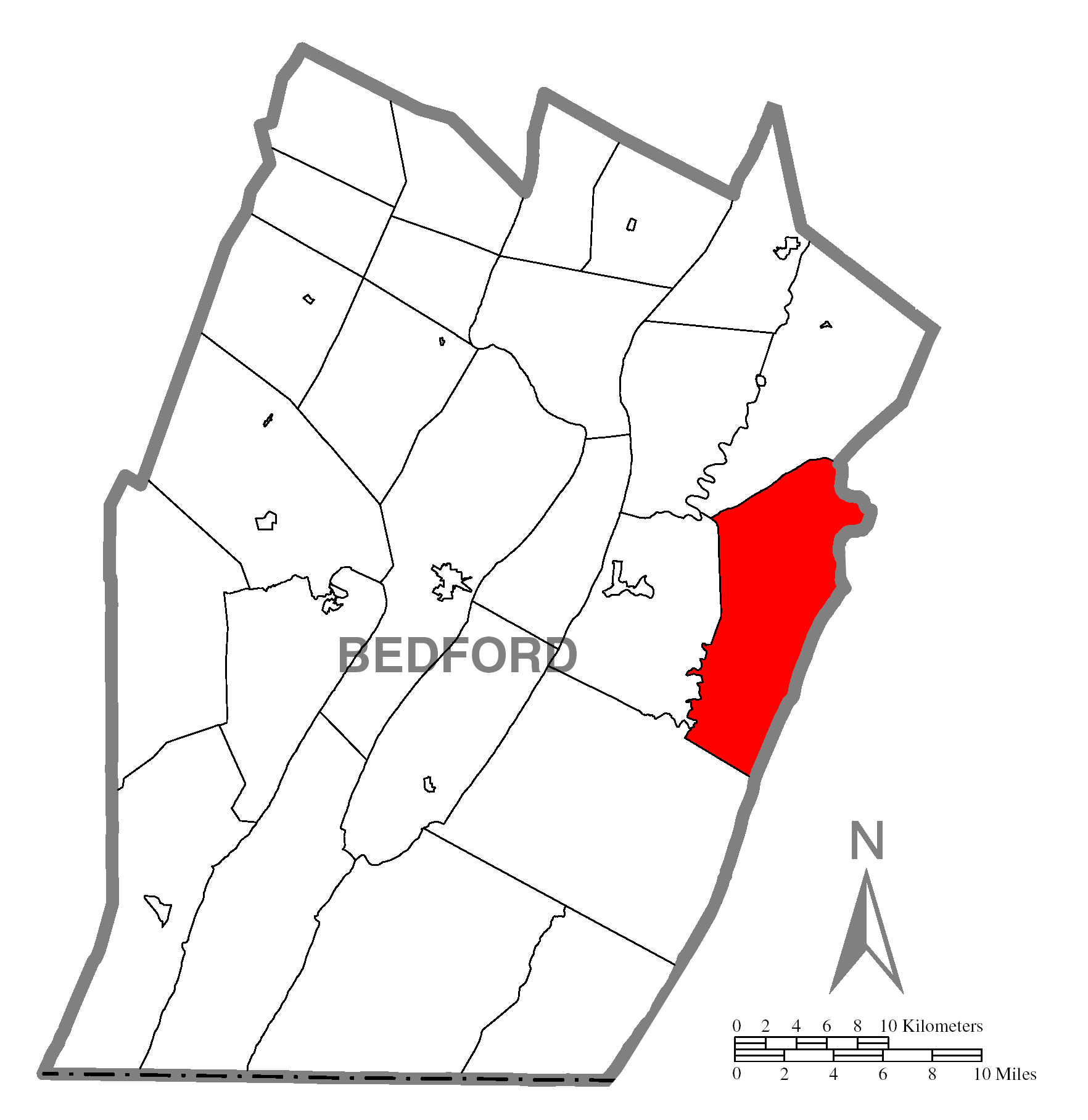
- Map of Bedford County, Pennsylvania highlighting East Providence Township

- Map of Bedford County, Pennsylvania
- Country: United States
- State: Pennsylvania
- County: Bedford
- Settled: 1780
- Incorporated: 1844

Area
  - Total: 50.76 sq mi (131.46 km^{2})
  - Land: 50.37 sq mi (130.47 km^{2})
  - Water: 0.38 sq mi (0.99 km^{2})

Population (2020)
  - Total: 1,756 ▼
  - Estimate (2023): 1,800
  - Density: 36.3/sq mi (14.01/km^{2})
- Time zone: UTC-5 (Eastern (EST))
  - Summer (DST): UTC-4 (EDT)
- Area code: 814
- FIPS code: 42-009-21736

East Providence Township is a township in Bedford County, Pennsylvania, United States. The population was 1,800 at the 2020 census. The unincorporated community of Breezewood is in the township, which holds the Township's municipal buildings.

== History ==
The Feltons Mill Covered Bridge and Jacksons Mill Covered Bridge were listed on the National Register of Historic Places in 1980.

== Geography ==
East Providence Township is in eastern Bedford County. It is bordered by Monroe Township to the south, West Providence Township to the west, and Broad Top Township to the north. To the east is Fulton County, with Wells Township to the northeast and Brush Creek Township to the east and southeast. The unincorporated community of Breezewood is in the eastern part of the township, where U.S. Route 30, Interstate 70, and Interstate 76 (the Pennsylvania Turnpike) intersect.

The eastern boundary of the township is formed by Rays Hill, a long mountain ridge.

According to the United States Census Bureau, the township has a total area of 50.8 square miles (131.5 km^{2}), of which 50.4 square miles (130.5 km^{2}) is land and 0.39 square miles (1.0 km^{2}), or 0.76%, is water.

== Demographics ==
Historical population
Census	Pop.	Note	%±
2000	1,858		—
2010	1,854		−0.2%
2020	1,756		−5.3%
2023 (est.)	1,800		2.5%
U.S. Decennial Census

As of the census of 2000, there were 1,858 people, 742 households, and 546 families residing in the township. The population density was 36.8 inhabitants per square mile (14.2/km^{2}). There were 879 housing units at an average density of 17.4/sq mi (6.7/km^{2}). The racial makeup of the township was 99.03% White, 0.11% African American, 0.11% Native American, 0.22% Asian, and 0.54% from two or more races. Hispanic or Latino of any race were 0.54% of the population.

There were 742 households, out of which 32.1% had children under the age of 18 living with them, 59.8% were married couples living together, 8.1% had a female householder with no husband present, and 26.3% were non-families. 22.8% of all households were made up of individuals, and 10.5% had someone living alone who was 65 years of age or older. The average household size was 2.50 and the average family size was 2.93.

In the township the population was spread out, with 24.2% under the age of 18, 6.8% from 18 to 24, 29.1% from 25 to 44, 26.6% from 45 to 64, and 13.3% who were 65 years of age or older. The median age was 38 years. For every 100 females, there were 100.4 males. For every 100 females age 18 and over, there were 99.6 males.

The median income for a household in the township was $30,495, and the median income for a family was $33,150. Males had a median income of $26,328 versus $17,331 for females. The per capita income for the township was $15,015. About 9.7% of families and 11.7% of the population were below the poverty line, including 12.5% of those under age 18 and 10.2% of those age 65 or over.
