= Bedford County Alms House =

- U.S. National Register of Historic Places
- U.S. Historic district
- Location within Pennsylvania Location within the United States
- Location: Cumberland Road, .4 miles (0.64 km) south of Bedford, Bedford Township, Pennsylvania
- Coordinates: 39°59′13″N 78°32′32″W
- Area: 9.7 acres (3.9 ha)
- Built: 1872-1873, 1899, 1900
- Architect: Simon, L.M.
- Architectural style: Italianate
- NRHP reference No.: 88002378
- Added to NRHP: November 3, 1988

Bedford County Alms House, also known as Bedford County Home, is a historic almshouse and national historic district located at Bedford Township, Bedford County, Pennsylvania. The district includes six contributing buildings. They are the Alms House (1872-1873), infirmary building (1899), laundry (1900), and a storage shed and two barns built between the early 1900s and about 1950. The Alms House is a four-story, brick building, 13-bays wide and 3-bays deep. It has a hipped roof and features a central tower with porches. The facility closed in 1978.

It was added to the National Register of Historic Places in 1988.
