= Clearville, Pennsylvania =

Unincorporated community in Pennsylvania, US

- Census-designated place
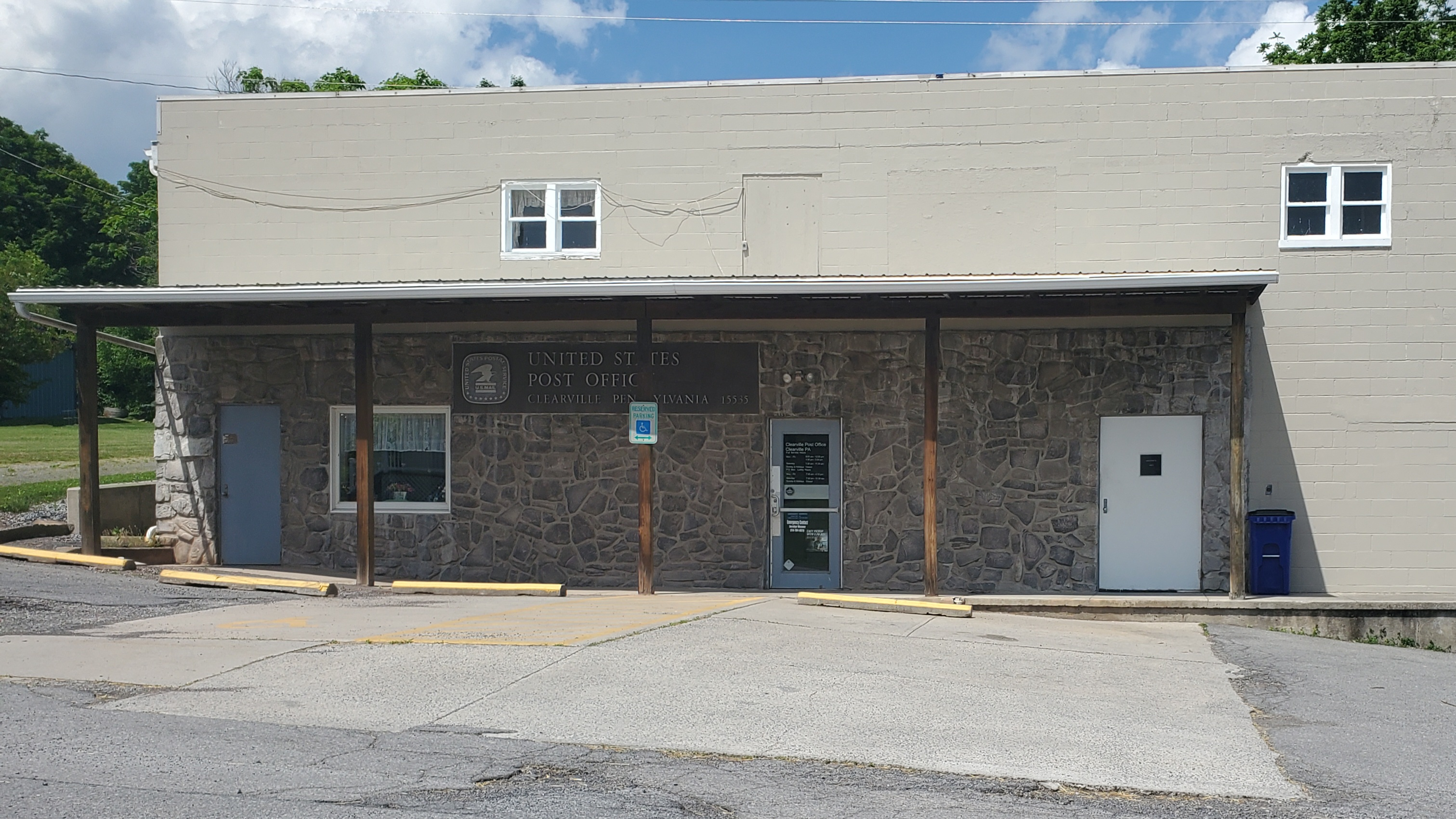
- Clearville post office

- Location within Pennsylvania
- Coordinates: 39°55′05″N 78°22′58″W
- Country: United States
- State: Pennsylvania
- County: Bedford
- Elevation: 1,388 ft (423 m)
- Time zone: UTC-5 (Eastern (EST))
  - Summer (DST): UTC-4 (EDT)
- ZIP code: 15535
- Area code: 814
- GNIS feature ID: 2830767

Clearville is an unincorporated community in Bedford County, Pennsylvania, United States. The community is located along Pennsylvania Route 26, 6.6 miles (10.6 km) south of Everett. Clearville has a post office, with ZIP code 15535.

== Demographics ==
Historical population
Census	Pop.	Note	%±
2023 (est.)	136

The United States Census Bureau defined Clearville as a census designated place in 2023.
