= Russell House (Bedford, Pennsylvania) =

Historic house in Pennsylvania, United States

- U.S. National Register of Historic Places
- Pennsylvania state historical marker
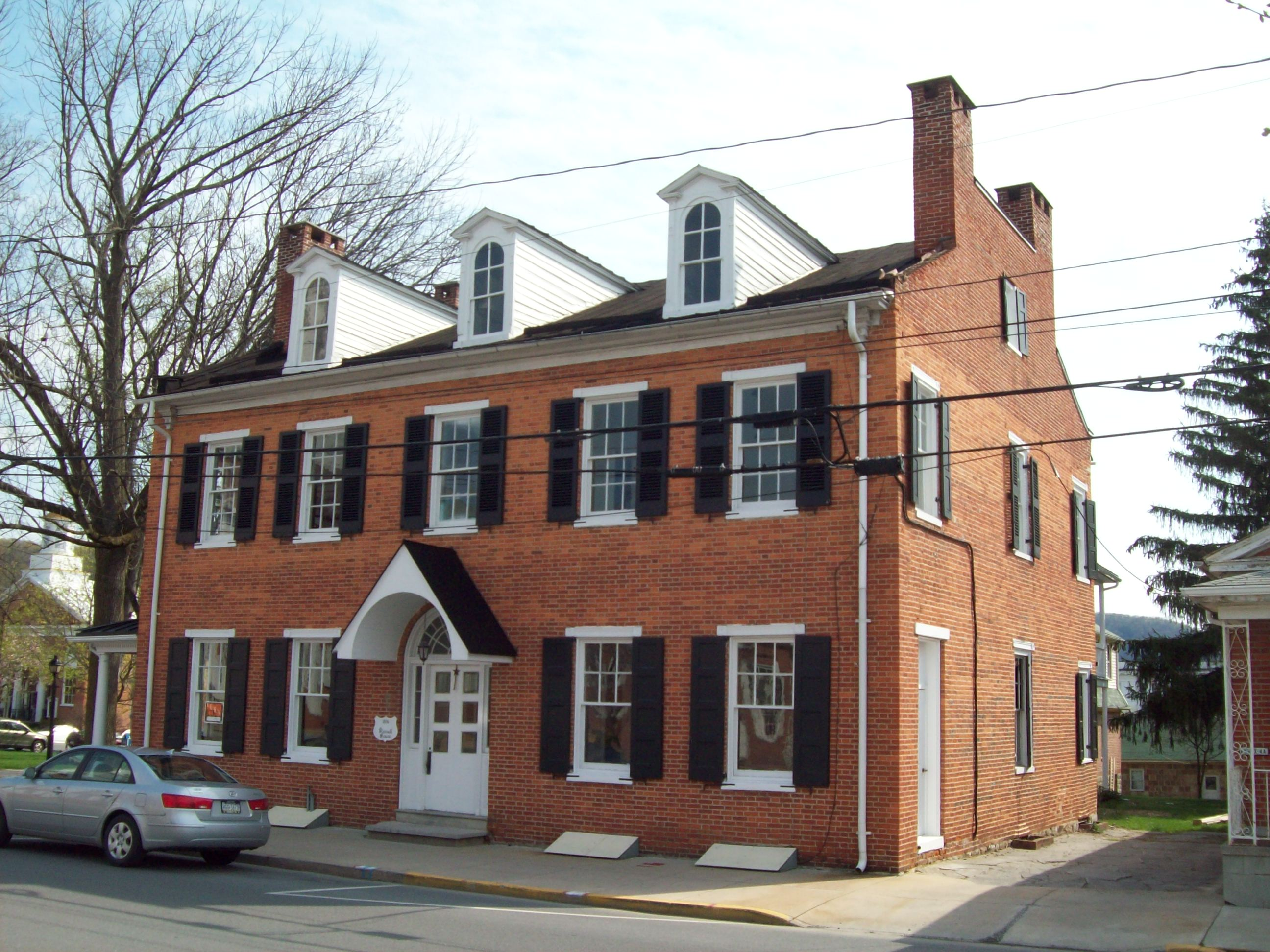
- Russell House, April 2010

- Location within Pennsylvania Location within the United States
- Location: 203 S. Juliana St., Bedford, Pennsylvania
- Coordinates: 40°1′0″N 78°30′14″W
- Area: 0.5 acres (0.20 ha)
- Built: 1815-1816
- Built by: Solomon Filler
- Architect: Solomon Filler
- Architectural style: Georgian, Federal
- NRHP reference No.: 79002165

Significant dates
- Added to NRHP: June 19, 1979
- Designated PHMC: June 25, 1951

Russell House, also known as the Pate Funeral Home, is an historic home that is located in Bedford in Bedford County, Pennsylvania, United States.

It was listed on the National Register of Historic Places in 1979.

== History and architectural features ==
Built between 1815 and 1816, this historic structure is a 2 1/2-story, five-bay by three-bay, brick dwelling that was designed in the late-Georgian style. A two-story rear ell was added sometime between 1840 and 1845. The tin-covered gable roof has three gable-roof, frame dormers.

Solomon Filler was hired to design and build the house.

The Russell House was purchased in May 2017 by the Bedford County Chamber of Commerce, with plans to create a Business & Education Center to serve the Bedford County region. When renovated, the building is expected to house as many as twenty-four new businesses in accelerator and shared-workspace operations. Additional features will include: community art exhibits, historical displays, a community meeting space, a heritage garden, and a veranda adjacent to Veterans Grove.

It was listed on the National Register of Historic Places in 1979.
