= Juniata Township, Bedford County, Pennsylvania =

Township in Pennsylvania, US

Coordinates: 39°59′40″N 78°42′07″W

- Township
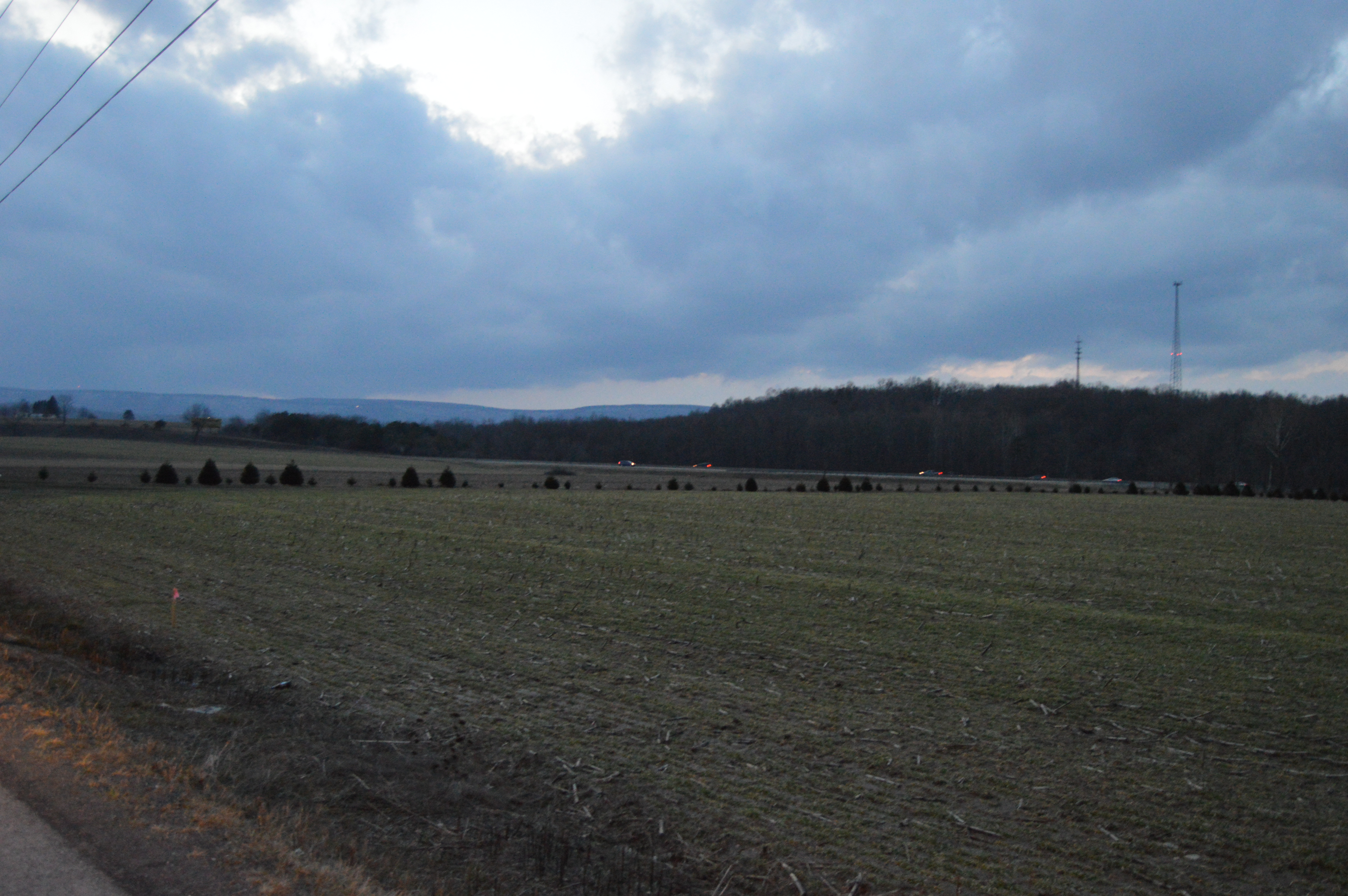
- Fields at dusk near the Pennsylvania Turnpike

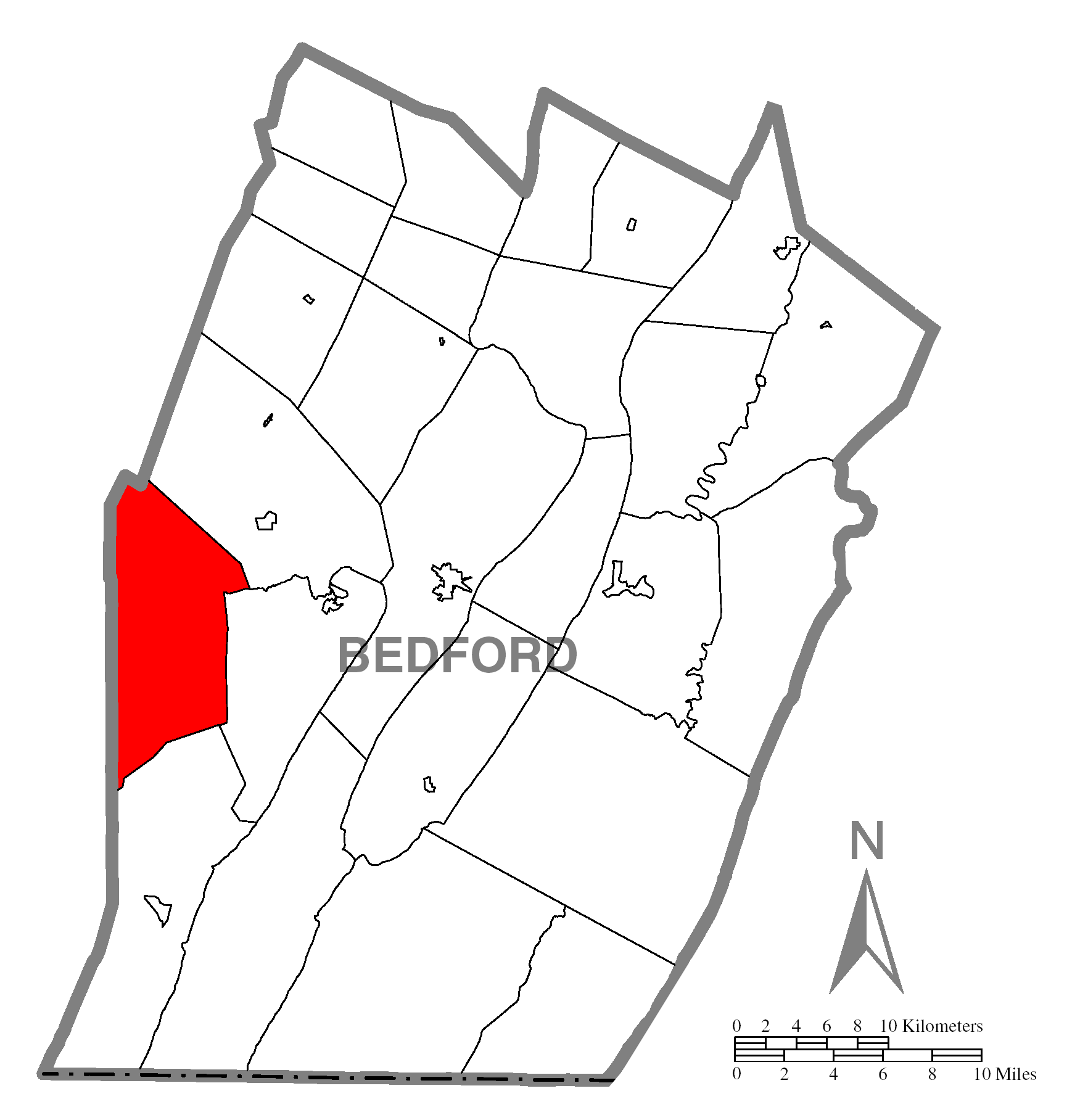
- Map of Bedford County, Pennsylvania highlighting Juniata Township

- Map of Bedford County, Pennsylvania
- Country: United States
- State: Pennsylvania
- County: Bedford
- Settled: 1790
- Incorporated: 1853

Area
  - Total: 47.51 sq mi (123.05 km^{2})
  - Land: 47.43 sq mi (122.84 km^{2})
  - Water: 0.085 sq mi (0.22 km^{2})

Population (2020)
  - Total: 901 ▼
  - Estimate (2023): 906
  - Density: 19.6/sq mi (7.57/km^{2})
- Time zone: UTC-5 (Eastern (EST))
  - Summer (DST): UTC-4 (EDT)
- Area code: 814
- FIPS code: 42-009-38576

Juniata Township is a township that is located in Bedford County, Pennsylvania, United States. The population was 901 at the time of the 2020 census.

== Geography ==
Juniata Township is located in western Bedford County, along the Somerset County line. It is bordered to the northeast by Napier Township, to the east by Harrison Township, and to the south by Londonderry Township. Neighboring Somerset County townships are Allegheny Township to the west and Shade Township to the north.

Pennsylvania Route 31 passes through Juniata Township, running from the township's western border with Allegheny Township, Somerset County, to Juniata's eastern border with Harrison Township. For much of this passage through the township, Route 31 parallels both the Pennsylvania Turnpike and the Raystown Branch of the Juniata River.

According to the United States Census Bureau, Juniata Township has a total area of 47.5 square miles (123.1 km^{2}), of which 47.4 square miles (122.8 km^{2}) is land and 0.077 square miles (0.2 km^{2}), or 0.17%, is water.

== Recreation ==
Two small portions of the Pennsylvania State Game Lands Number 104 are located at the southern corner of the township and a portion of Shawnee State Park is located near the northeast corner of the township.

== Demographics ==
Historical population
Census	Pop.	Note	%±
2010	954		—
2020	901		−5.6%
2023 (est.)	906		0.6%
U.S. Decennial Census

As of the census of 2000, there were 1,016 people, 395 households, and 310 families residing in the township.

The population density was 21.4 people per square mile (8.3/km^{2}). There were 585 housing units at an average density of 12.3/sq mi (4.8/km^{2}).

The racial makeup of the township was 98.23% White, 0.10% Native American, 0.20% Asian, 0.20% from other races, and 1.28% from two or more races. Hispanic or Latino of any race were 1.18% of the population.

There were 395 households, out of which 27.8% had children under the age of eighteen living with them; 67.3% were married couples living together, 6.3% had a female householder with no husband present, and 21.5% were non-families. 18.5% of all households were made up of individuals, and 9.1% had someone living alone who was sixty-five years of age or older.

The average household size was 2.56 and the average family size was 2.87.

Within the township, the population was spread out, with 22.8% who were under the age of eighteen, 5.0% from eighteen to twenty-four, 28.0% from twenty-five to forty-four, 29.6% from forty-five to sixty-four, and 14.6% who were sixty-five years of age or older. The median age was forty-one years.

For every one hundred females there were 105.7 males. For every one hundred females who were aged eighteen or older, there were 104.7 males.

The median income for a household in the township was $34,081, and the median income for a family was $35,952. Males had a median income of $30,737 compared with that of $20,156 for females.

The per capita income for the township was $13,990.

Approximately 13.1% of families and 14.9% of the population were living below the poverty line, including 11.3% of those who were under the age of eighteen and 21.1% of those who were aged sixty-five or older.
