= Buffalo Mills, Pennsylvania =

Unincorporated community in Pennsylvania, US

- Unincorporated community
- Location within Pennsylvania
- Coordinates: 39°56′00″N 78°38′45″W
- Country: United States
- State: Pennsylvania
- County: Bedford
- Elevation: 1,654 ft (504 m)
- Time zone: UTC-5 (Eastern (EST))
  - Summer (DST): UTC-4 (EDT)
- ZIP code: 15534
- Area code: 814
- GNIS feature ID: 1170607

Buffalo Mills is an unincorporated community in Bedford County, Pennsylvania, United States. The community is located along Pennsylvania Route 96, 5 miles (8.0 km) southwest of Manns Choice. Buffalo Mills has a post office, with ZIP code 15534.
