= New Paris =

New Paris may refer to

== Places ==
=== United States ===
- New Paris, Indiana
- New Paris, Ohio
- New Paris, Pennsylvania
- New Paris, Wisconsin

== See also ==
- Paris
- New France
