= Hyndman Middle-High School =

Coordinates: 39.8246°N 78.7283°W

Hyndman Middle-High
- Hyndman, PA; United States

Information
- Type: Middle school & High School
- Closed: 2011
- School district: Bedford Area
- Principal: Paul Ruhlman
- Grades: 6-12
- Mascot: Hornet
- Website: Hyndman Middle-High

Hyndman Middle-High School is 6-12 combined Middle School and High School located in Hyndman, Pennsylvania. It closed at the end of the 2010–2011 school year.
