= Sam Waters =

Sam Waters or Samuel Waters may refer to:

== People ==
- Sam Waters (footballer), for Sligo Rovers F.C.
- Samuel Waters, first recorded European settler in Hyndman, Pennsylvania

== Fiction ==
- Sam Waters, a character in the 1921 film Action
- Sam Waters, a character in the 1993 TV film I Can Make You Love Me
- Samantha "Sam" Waters, a character in the TV series Profiler
- Samantha "Sam" Waters, a crossover character in the TV series The Pretender
- Samantha "Sam" Booke Waters, a character in the TV series Brothers

== See also ==
- Sam Watters (born 1970), American musician
- Sam Walters (disambiguation)
- Samantha Waters (disambiguation)
