= Samantha Walters =

Samantha Walters may refer to:

- Samantha Browne-Walters, actress
- Samantha Walters, character in Cold Squad

== See also ==
- Samantha Waters (disambiguation)
- Samuel Walters (disambiguation)
