= Manns Choice, Pennsylvania =

Borough in Pennsylvania, US

- Borough
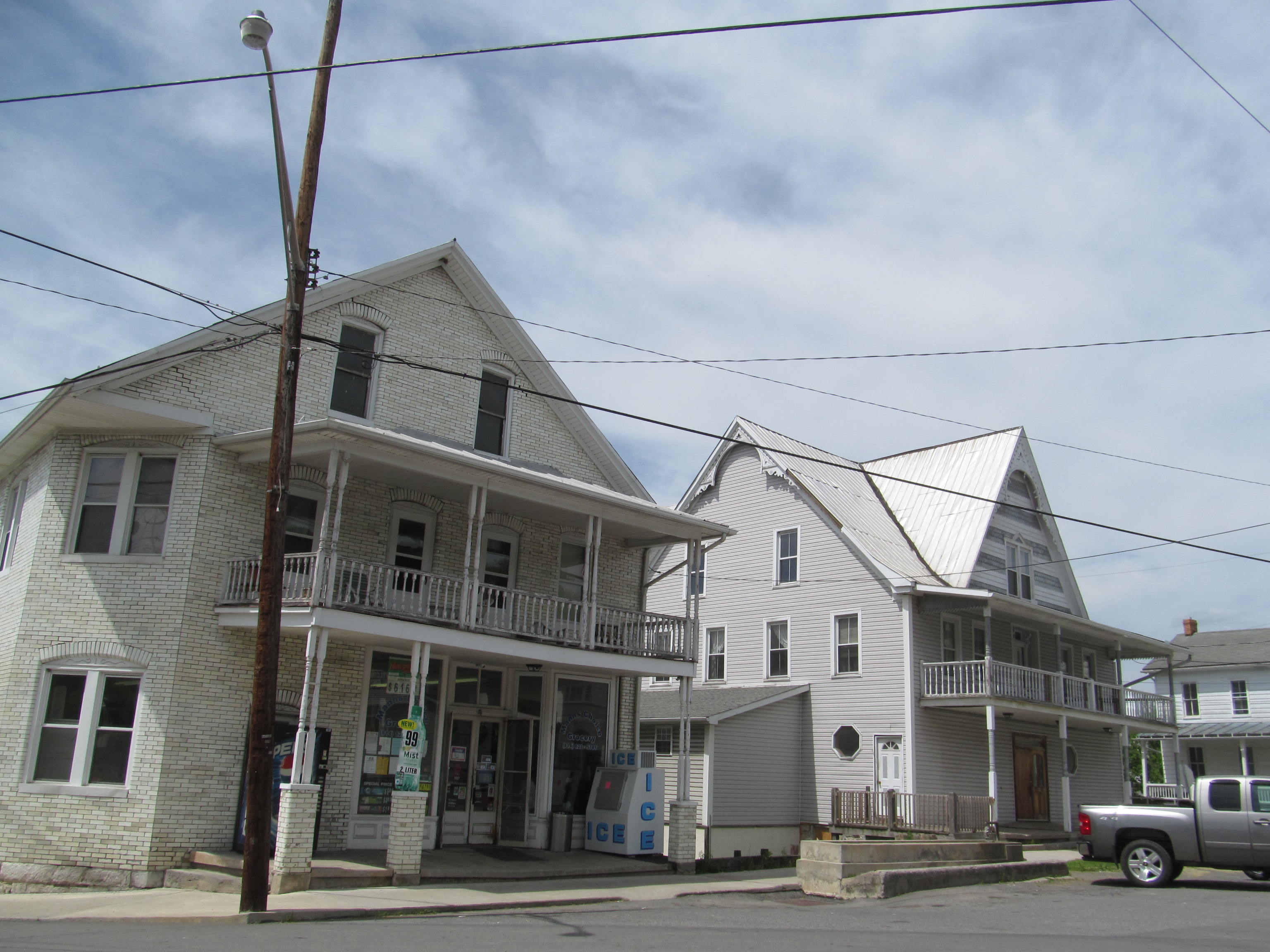
- Store in Manns Choice

- Location of Manns Choice in Bedford County, Pennsylvania.

- Location within Pennsylvania
- Coordinates: 40°00′10″N 78°35′29″W
- Country: United States
- State: Pennsylvania
- County: Bedford
- Settled: 1848
- Incorporated: 1886

Government
  - Type: Borough Council

Area
  - Total: 0.51 sq mi (1.31 km^{2})
  - Land: 0.50 sq mi (1.30 km^{2})
  - Water: 0.0039 sq mi (0.01 km^{2})
- Elevation: 1,460 ft (450 m)

Population (2020)
  - Total: 316
  - Density: 631/sq mi (243.7/km^{2})
- Time zone: UTC-5 (Eastern (EST))
  - Summer (DST): UTC-4 (EDT)
- Zip code: 15550
- Area code: 814
- FIPS code: 42-46944

Manns Choice is a borough in Bedford County, Pennsylvania, United States. The population was 316 at the 2020 census.

== Name ==
In 1848, Congressman Job Mann pressured to have a post office at an unnamed village in Harrison Township. The Post Office Department approved the new post office, but as the village had no name, Congressman Mann was to give it one. Before he did so, postal maps were made with the temporary designation "Mann's Choice" written on it. The name was never changed, and became the permanent and official one.

== Geography ==
Manns Choice is located in west-central Bedford County at 40°0′10″N 78°35′29″W (40.002836, -78.591440), in the valley of the Raystown Branch of the Juniata River. Buffalo Mountain and Wills Mountain rise to the east. The borough is mostly surrounded by Harrison Township, but it is bordered by Napier Township to the northwest.

Pennsylvania Routes 31 and 96 pass through the borough. Route 31 leads northeast 3.4 miles (5.5 km) to U.S. Route 30 west of Bedford, while Route 96 heads south 15 miles (24 km) to Hyndman and 29 miles (47 km) to Cumberland, Maryland. Route 31 and 96 together head northwest out of town, Route 96 leading to Shawnee State Park and Schellsburg, and Route 31 leading eventually to Somerset. Interstate 76, the Pennsylvania Turnpike, passes just north of the borough limits but does not provide access; the nearest exit is in Bedford.

According to the United States Census Bureau, the borough has a total area of 0.51 square miles (1.31 km^{2}), of which 0.004 square miles (0.01 km^{2}), or 1.02%, is water.

Manns Choice town center still preserves its historical watering trough once used to water the horses pulling traveling stages on their way across "the glades", now Glades Pike, to Fort Pitt, now Pittsburgh. It has chiefly been an agricultural community since its settlement following the Revolutionary War. The town's farms and forest were once a land grant offered to German mercenary Hessian Jägers paying loyalty to General George Washington's infantry.

Prior to its settlement, the area was home to the Shawnee and Monongahela native tribes. The tribes inhabited the area's many small creeks, river banks and meadowlands. They groomed a well balanced permacultural environment which still exists on thousands of surrounding acres of state forests, parks and farmlands today.

The primary industry is agriculture. Of its many farms, Horn O' Plenty Farm and Fresh-taurant is noted for pioneering innovative agricultural practices and markets that have influenced the region, reassuring confidence for the future of farmers.

The historic White Sulphur Springs Hotel is located 4 miles (6 km) south of the borough in Harrison Township. Built in 1884, the building originated as a hotel and restaurant, and is now home to the non-profit ministry of Officers Christian Fellowship, which serves military service people and their families as a retreat center. In the fall, winter and spring off-season, the facility operates as a conference center for churches, business meetings, banquets and day gatherings.

It is home to the Coral Caverns, which house the world's only fossilized coral reef, open to the public since 1932.

== Demographics ==
Historical population
Census	Pop.	Note	%±
1890	363		—
1900	312		−14.0%
1910	341		9.3%
1920	274		−19.6%
1930	271		−1.1%
1940	306		12.9%
1950	313		2.3%
1960	351		12.1%
1970	334		−4.8%
1980	286		−14.4%
1990	249		−12.9%
2000	291		16.9%
2010	300		3.1%
2020	316		5.3%
2021 (est.)	311	▼	−1.6%

As of the census of 2000, there were 291 people, 116 households, and 75 families residing in the borough. The population density was 620.0 inhabitants per square mile (239.4/km^{2}). There were 124 housing units at an average density of 264.2 units per square mile (102.0 units/km^{2}). The racial makeup of the borough was 99.66% White, and 0.34% from two or more races.

There were 116 households, out of which 31.9% had children under the age of 18 living with them, 45.7% were married couples living together, 16.4% had a female householder with no husband present, and 34.5% were non-families. 25.9% of all households were made up of individuals, and 15.5% had someone living alone who was 65 years of age or older. The average household size was 2.51 and the average family size was 3.05.

In the borough the population was spread out, with 28.2% under the age of 18, 6.9% from 18 to 24, 27.8% from 25 to 44, 23.7% from 45 to 64, and 13.4% who were 65 years of age or older. The median age was 36 years. For every 100 females there were 85.4 males. For every 100 females age 18 and over, there were 85.0 males.

The median income for a household in the borough was $31,500, and the median income for a family was $36,042. Males had a median income of $29,375 versus $17,917 for females. The per capita income for the borough was $13,533. About 6.7% of families and 8.8% of the population were below the poverty line, including 11.5% of those under the age of eighteen and none of those sixty-five or over.
