= Corriganville, Maryland =

- Census-designated place
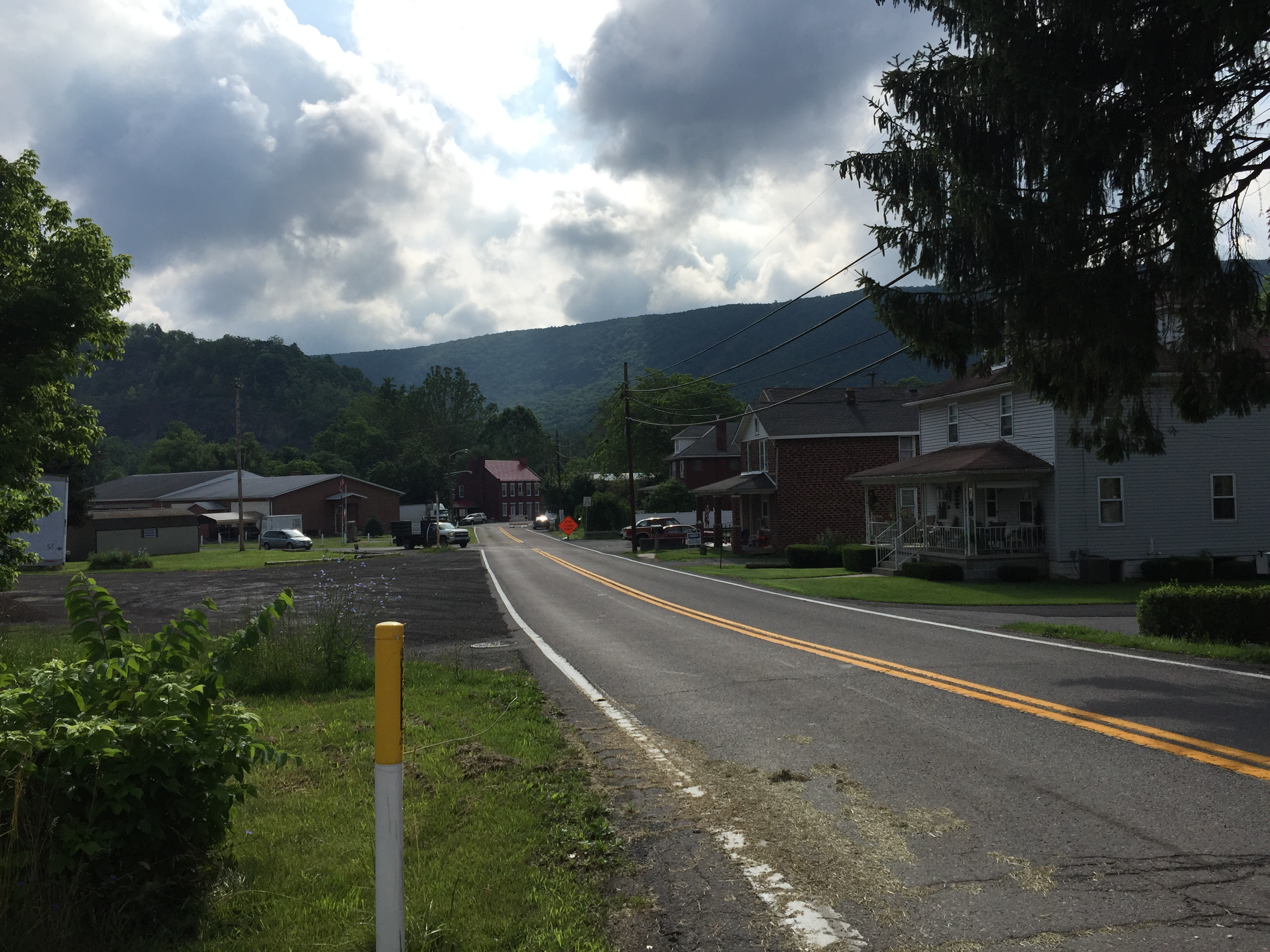
- Kreighbaum Road in Corriganville

- Location within the State of Maryland Corriganville, Maryland (the United States)
- Coordinates: 39°41′41″N 78°47′50″W
- Country: United States
- State: Maryland
- County: Allegany

Area
  - Total: 0.36 sq mi (0.94 km^{2})
  - Land: 0.36 sq mi (0.94 km^{2})
  - Water: 0 sq mi (0.00 km^{2})
- Elevation: 866 ft (264 m)

Population (2020)
  - Total: 421
  - Density: 1,165.0/sq mi (449.79/km^{2})
- Time zone: UTC−5 (Eastern (EST))
  - Summer (DST): UTC−4 (EDT)
- ZIP code: 21524
- FIPS code: 24-19975
- GNIS feature ID: 2583601

Corriganville is an unincorporated community and census-designated place (CDP) in Allegany County, Maryland, United States. As of the 2010 census it had a population of 455. Corriganville is part of the Cumberland, MD-WV Metropolitan Statistical Area.

Industry in the area includes the quarry operated by the Cumberland Cement and Supply Company, which mines the limestone and shale of the Helderberg Group and the Keyser Limestone.

== Geography ==
Corriganville lies north of Cumberland at the confluence of Wills Creek and Jennings Run. Maryland Route 36 passes through Corriganville, and Maryland Route 35 heads north from there to Ellerslie.

== Demographics ==
Historical population
Census	Pop.	Note	%±
2020	421		—
U.S. Decennial Census

== Cumberland Bone Cave ==
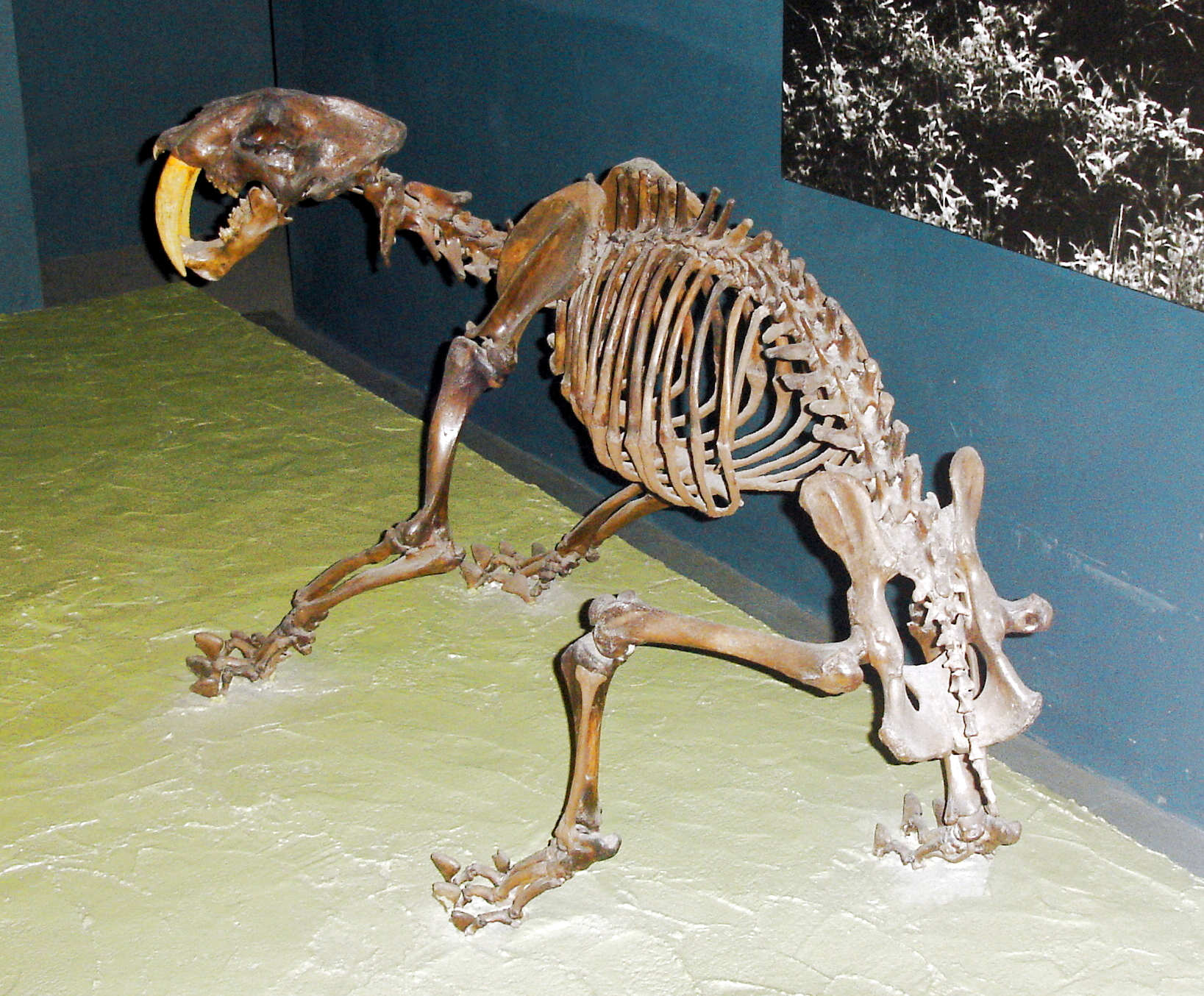
A fossilized skeleton of a Smilodon californicus on display at the Smithsonian Museum of Natural History

In 1912, workers excavating a cut for the Western Maryland Railway broke into a partly filled cave along the western slope of Wills Mountain, near Corriganville. A local naturalist, Raymond Armbruster, observed fossil bones among the rocks that had been blasted loose and were being removed from the cut. Armbruster notified paleontologists at the Smithsonian Institution, and James W. Gidley began excavating that same year. The cave later became known as the Cumberland Bone Cave.

Between 1912 and 1916, Gidley excavated the Cumberland Bone Cave, where 41 genera of mammals were found, about 16 per cent of which are extinct. Numerous excellent skulls and enough bones to reconstruct skeletons for a number of the species were present. Skeletons of the Pleistocene cave bear and an extinct saber-toothed cat from the Bone Cave are on permanent exhibit in the Ice Age Mammal exhibit at the National Museum of Natural History, Smithsonian Institution in Washington, D.C. Many of the fossilized bones date from 200,000 years ago. The Cumberland Bone cave represents one of the finest Pleistocene-era faunas known from eastern North America.

== Notable person ==
- Hometown of Sergeant Joseph Darby, who exposed the Abu Ghraib torture and prisoner abuse
