= Maryland Route 35 =

State highway in Allegany County, Maryland, US, known as Ellerslie Rd

Maryland Route 35
- Ellerslie Road
- Maryland Route 35 highlighted in red

Route information
- Maintained by MDSHA
- Length: 2.37 mi (3.81 km)
- Existed: 1927–present

Major junctions
- South end: MD 36 in Corriganville
- North end: PA 96 in Ellerslie

Location
- Country: United States
- State: Maryland
- Counties: Allegany

Highway system
- Maryland highway system; Interstate; US; State; Scenic Byways
← MD 34	→ MD 36

Maryland Route 35 (MD 35) is a state highway in the U.S. state of Maryland. Known as Ellerslie Road, the state highway runs 2.37 miles (3.81 km) north from MD 36 in Corriganville to the Pennsylvania state line in Ellerslie. There the highway continues north as Pennsylvania Route 96 (PA 96).

MD 35 was constructed in the late 1910s and was one of the original signed state highways in 1927. The state highway runs through the valley of Wills Creek, an important passage for the railroads beginning in the mid 19th century.

== Route description ==
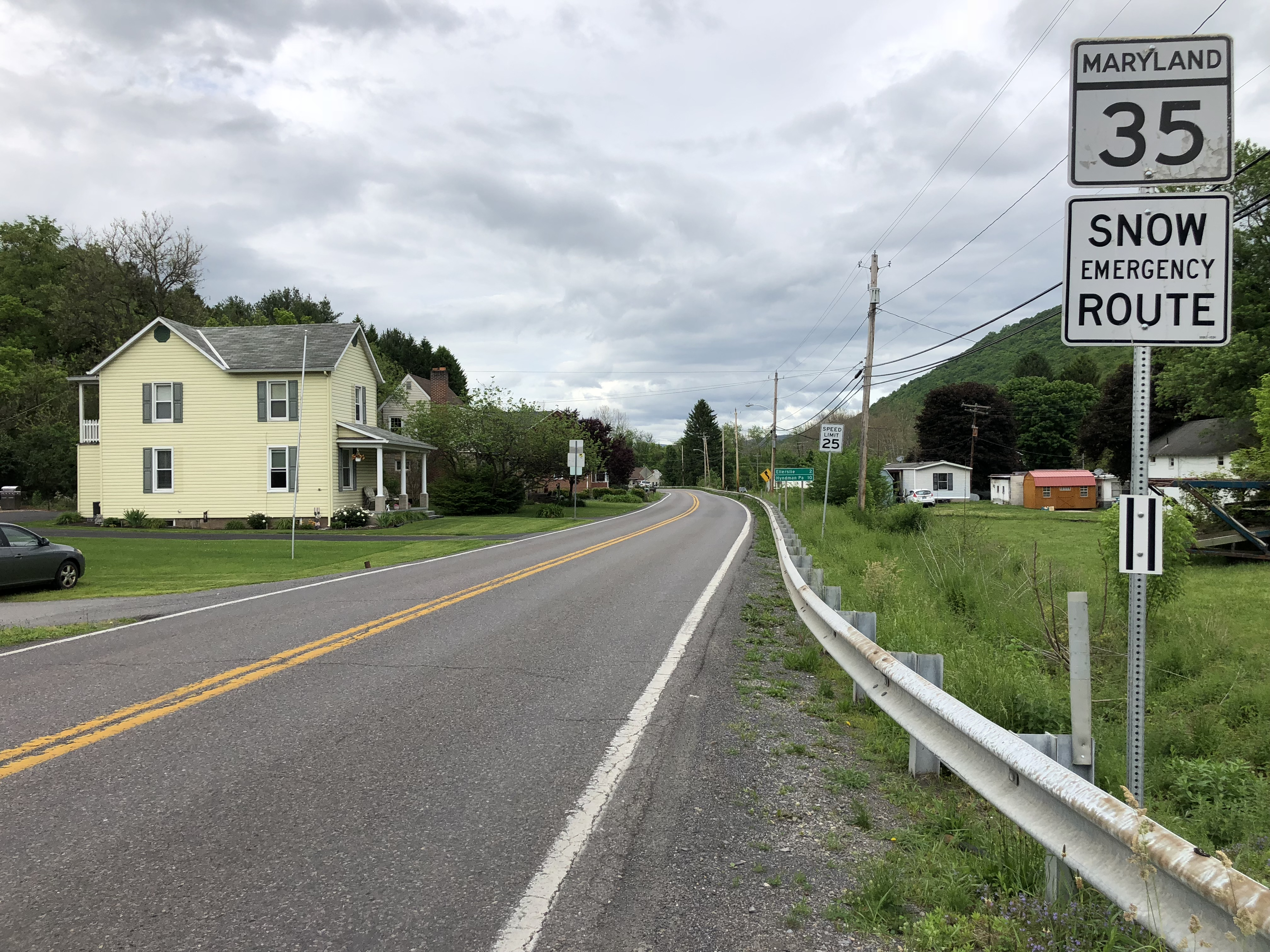
View north from the south end of MD 35 at MD 36 in Corriganville

MD 35 begins at an intersection with MD 36 (Mount Savage Road) in Corriganville. The state highway immediately intersects Kreigbaum Road, which is unsigned MD 831C. After leaving Corriganville, MD 35 heads north as a two-lane undivided road lined with scattered residences. The state highway runs through a narrow valley between Wills Mountain to the east and Little Allegheny Mountain to the west, paralleled by Wills Creek and CSX's Keystone Subdivision railroad line to the east. MD 35 passes through Ellerslie, within which the highway crosses a branch of Wills Creek, before reaching its northern terminus at the Pennsylvania state line. The highway continues north as PA 96 (Hyndman Road) toward Hyndman.

MD 35 is a part of the National Highway System as a principal arterial for its entire length.

== History ==
The valley of Wills Creek north of Corriganville has a significant place in railroad history as not only part of the ascent from Cumberland to the Summit of the Alleghenies at Sand Patch but also part of the route between Frostburg and Bedford, Pennsylvania. No less than three different railroads used the part of the valley north of Corriganville in the late 19th century: Baltimore and Ohio Railroad, Cumberland and Pennsylvania Railroad, and Western Maryland Railway. The first road built through the valley, the Creek Road, was present by 1898. This road was built adjacent to Wills Creek and remains today as Beach View Drive in Corriganville and Schellsburg Road in Ellerslie. Between 1917 and 1919 a new road was built by the Maryland State Roads Commission following the present alignment on the hillside above the creek. In 1927, this road was one of the original signed Maryland state numbered highways. The MD 35 designation originally extended further south along what is today MD 36 to U.S. Route 40 just above the Cumberland Narrows. The southern terminus of MD 35 was rolled back to Corriganville and replaced by MD 36 between 1939 and 1946.

== Junction list ==
The entire route is in Allegany County.

Location	mi	km	Destinations	Notes
Corriganville	0.00	0.00	MD 36 (Mount Savage Road) – Cumberland, Mount Savage	Southern terminus
Ellerslie	2.37	3.81	PA 96 north (Hyndman Road) – Hyndman	Pennsylvania state line; northern terminus
1.000 mi = 1.609 km; 1.000 km = 0.621 mi
