= Samantha Waters =

Samantha Waters may refer to:

- Samantha "Sam" Waters, character in Profiler (TV series)
- Samantha "Sam" Waters, character in The Pretender (TV series)
- Samantha "Sam" Booke Waters, character in Brothers (1984 TV series)

== See also ==
- Sam Waters (disambiguation)
- Samantha Walters (disambiguation)
