= New Paris, Pennsylvania =

Borough in Pennsylvania, US

- Borough
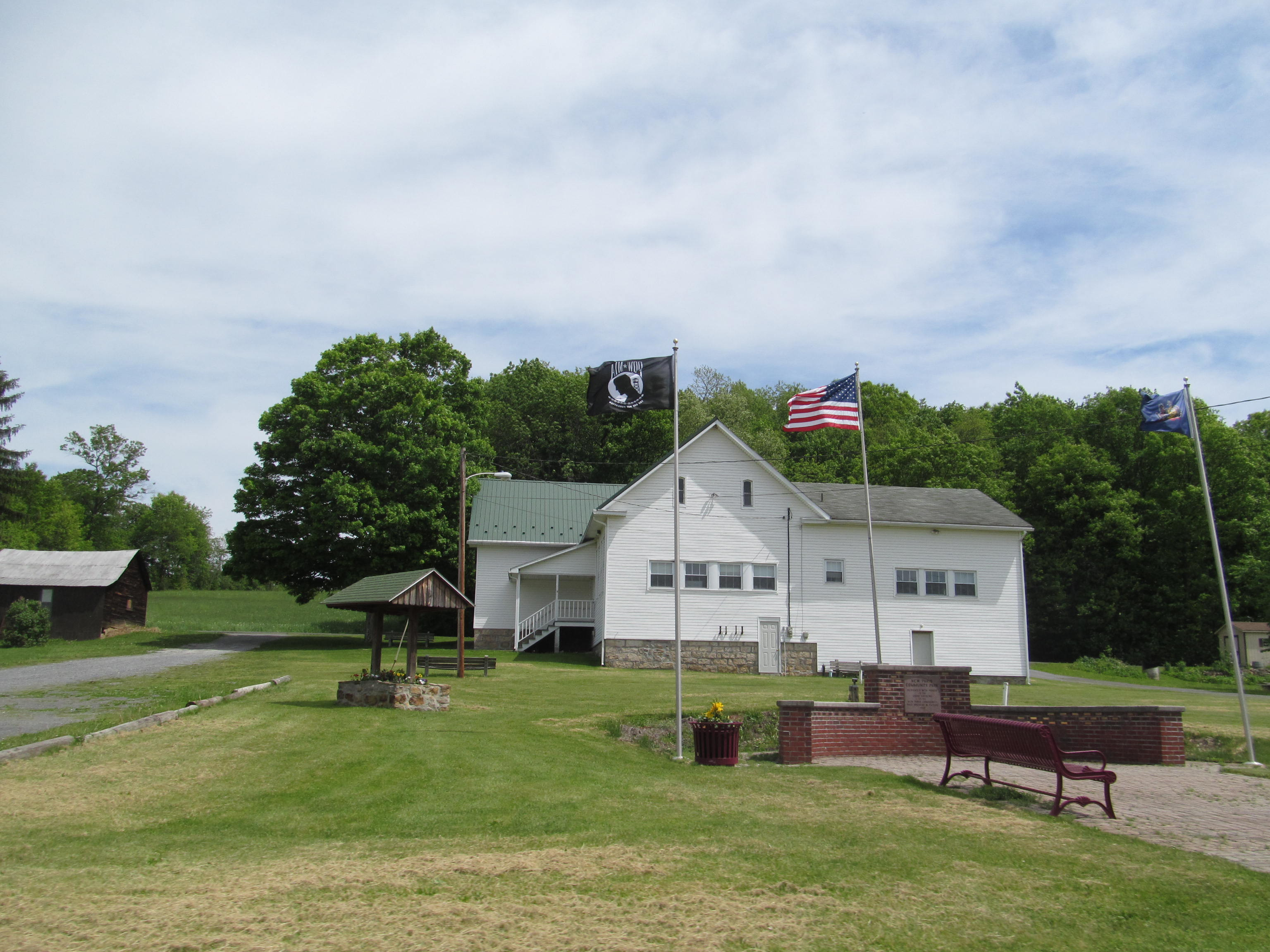
- Memorial and park in New Paris

- Location of New Paris in Bedford County, Pennsylvania.

- Location within Pennsylvania
- Coordinates: 40°06′27″N 78°38′40″W
- Country: United States
- State: Pennsylvania
- County: Bedford
- Settled: 1846
- Incorporated: 1882

Government
  - Type: Borough Council

Area
  - Total: 0.058 sq mi (0.15 km^{2})
  - Land: 0.058 sq mi (0.15 km^{2})
  - Water: 0 sq mi (0.00 km^{2})
- Elevation: 1,650 ft (500 m)

Population (2020)
  - Total: 192
  - Density: 3,327.6/sq mi (1,284.81/km^{2})
- Time zone: UTC-5 (Eastern (EST))
  - Summer (DST): UTC-4 (EDT)
- Zip code: 15554
- Area code: 814
- FIPS code: 42-53928

New Paris is a borough in Bedford County, Pennsylvania, United States. The population was 192 at the 2020 census.

== History ==
This borough was first settled in 1846 by William Blackburn and was named in 1851. New Paris was officially incorporated as a borough on September 7, 1882.

== Geography ==
New Paris is located in western Bedford County at 40°6′27″N 78°38′40″W (40.107564, -78.644470), northwest of Bedford, north of Schellsburg and east-northeast of Somerset. It lies on the west side of Chestnut Ridge.

Pennsylvania Route 96 (Cortland Road) runs through the town, leading south 4.6 miles (7.4 km) to Schellsburg and U.S. Route 30, and north 5.5 miles (8.9 km) to Pleasantville and Pennsylvania Route 56.

According to the United States Census Bureau, New Paris has a total area of 0.058 square miles (0.15 km^{2}), all land.

== Demographics ==
Historical population
Census	Pop.	Note	%±
1880	176		—
1890	196		11.4%
1900	205		4.6%
1910	194		−5.4%
1920	197		1.5%
1930	207		5.1%
1940	201		−2.9%
1950	202		0.5%
1960	232		14.9%
1970	204		−12.1%
1980	199		−2.5%
1990	223		12.1%
2000	214		−4.0%
2010	186		−13.1%
2020	192		3.2%
2021 (est.)	201	▲	4.7%

As of the census of 2000, there were 214 people, 79 households, and 62 families residing in the borough. The population density was 4,158.3 inhabitants per square mile (1,605.5/km^{2}). There were 84 housing units at an average density of 1,632.2 per square mile (630.2/km^{2}). The racial makeup of the borough was 99.53% White and 0.47% Asian.

There were 79 households, out of which 40.5% had children under the age of 18 living with them, 59.5% were married couples living together, 16.5% had a female householder with no husband present, and 21.5% were non-families. 19.0% of all households were made up of individuals, and 13.9% had someone living alone who was 65 years of age or older. The average household size was 2.71 and the average family size was 3.11.

In the borough the population was spread out, with 32.2% under the age of 18, 7.0% from 18 to 24, 26.2% from 25 to 44, 21.0% from 45 to 64, and 13.6% who were 65 years of age or older. The median age was 34 years. For every 100 females there were 86.1 males. For every 100 females age 18 and over, there were 70.6 males.

The median income for a household in the borough was $34,792, and the median income for a family was $34,375. Males had a median income of $28,750 versus $21,042 for females. The per capita income for the borough was $13,279. About 11.5% of families and 7.9% of the population were below the poverty line, including none of those under the age of eighteen and 17.4% of those sixty five or over.

== Education ==
New Paris is served by the Chestnut Ridge School District.

== Media ==
The town has one newspaper, the New Paris Review. Originally called the New Paris Star, it was created in 1881 with C. S. Davis as its editor.

== Gravity Hill ==
A road in New Paris offers the gravity hill phenomenon in which cars appear to roll uphill unaided, and even water appears to roll uphill. A website offers a driving tour to explore this.
