= Ellerslie, Maryland =

- Census-designated place
- Location within the State of Maryland Ellerslie (the United States)
- Coordinates: 39°43′01″N 78°46′29″W
- Country: United States
- State: Maryland
- County: Allegany

Area
  - Total: 0.95 sq mi (2.46 km^{2})
  - Land: 0.92 sq mi (2.39 km^{2})
  - Water: 0.023 sq mi (0.06 km^{2})
- Elevation: 722 ft (220 m)

Population (2020)
  - Total: 651
  - Density: 705.4/sq mi (272.34/km^{2})
- Time zone: UTC−5 (Eastern (EST))
  - Summer (DST): UTC−4 (EDT)
- ZIP code: 21529
- Area codes: 301, 240
- FIPS code: 24-25925
- GNIS feature ID: 2583613

Ellerslie is an unincorporated community and census-designated place (CDP) in Allegany County, Maryland, United States. As of the 2010 census it had a population of 572. Ellerslie is part of the Cumberland, MD-WV Metropolitan Statistical Area.

The community is named for Elderslie, Scotland, the birthplace of Scottish hero William Wallace.

== History ==
In the early twentieth century, Ellerslie contained a planing mill and a Standard Oil Company pumping station.

== Geography ==
Ellerslie lies along Maryland Route 35, 7 miles (11 km) north of Cumberland and is next to the Pennsylvania-Maryland state line. To the north, Pennsylvania Route 96 extends 8 miles (13 km) to Hyndman and 31 miles (50 km) to Bedford. The town is situated in the valley of Wills Creek, between the parallel ridges of Little Allegheny Mountain to the west and Wills Mountain to the east.

== Demographics ==
Historical population
| Census | Pop. | Note | %± |
|---|---|---|---|
| 2020 | 651 | | — |
U.S. Decennial Census
