= Samuel Walters =

Samuel or Sam Walters may refer to:

- Samuel Walters (artist) (1811–1882), English maritime artist
- Sam Walters (director) (born 1939), British theatre director
- Sam Walters (rugby league) (born 2000), English rugby league footballer
- Samuel Walters, candidate for Burin—Burgeo electoral district

== See also ==
- Sam Waters (disambiguation)
