= Pleasantville, Bedford County, Pennsylvania =

Borough in Pennsylvania, US

Pleasantville, Pennsylvania
- Borough
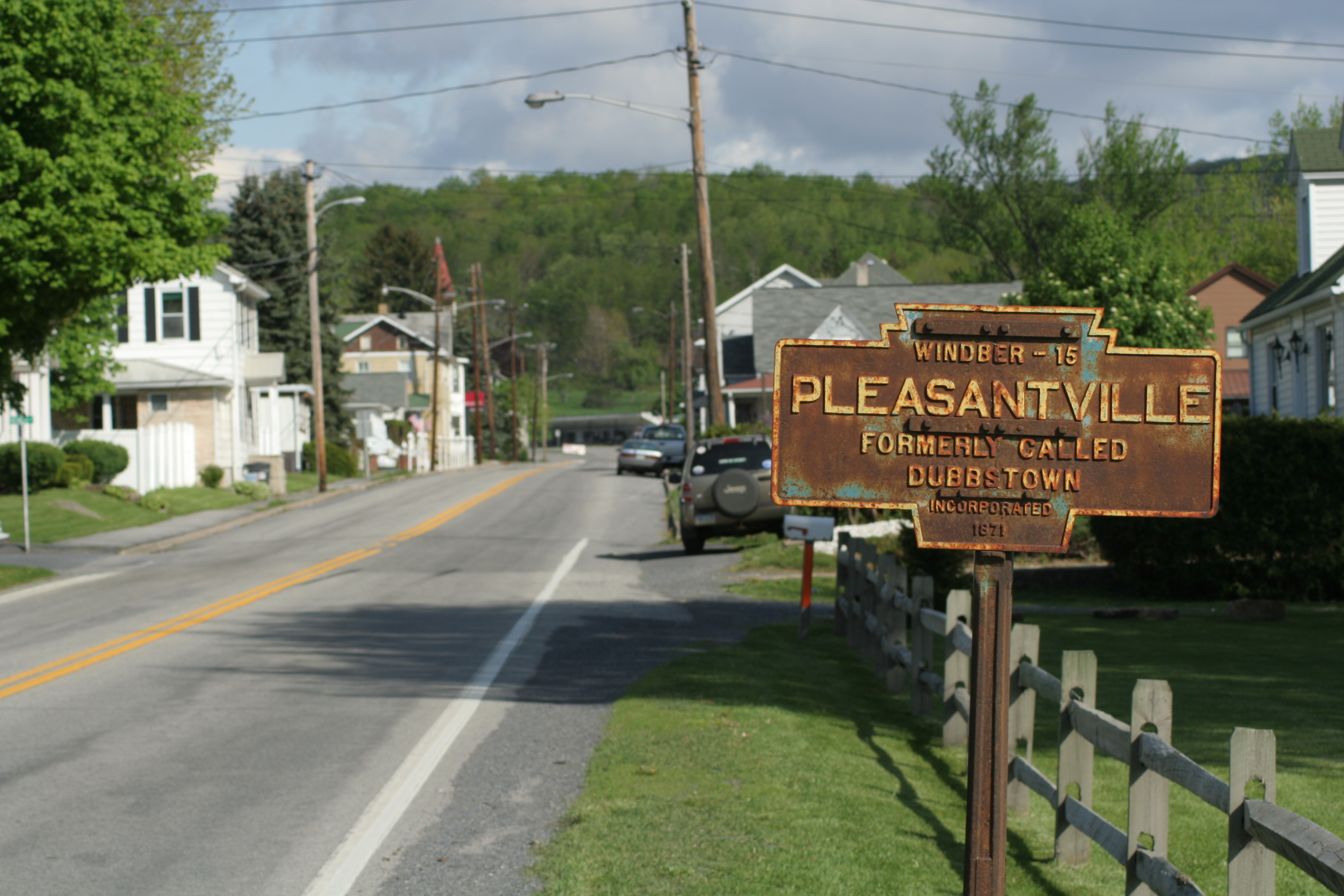

- Location of Pleasantville in Bedford County, Pennsylvania.

- Location within Pennsylvania
- Coordinates: 40°10′46″N 78°38′48″W
- Country: United States
- State: Pennsylvania
- County: Bedford
- Settled: 1824
- Incorporated: 1871

Government
  - Type: Borough Council

Area
  - Total: 0.073 sq mi (0.19 km^{2})
  - Land: 0.073 sq mi (0.19 km^{2})
  - Water: 0 sq mi (0.00 km^{2})
- Elevation: 1,437 ft (438 m)

Population (2020)
  - Total: 191
  - Density: 2,575.6/sq mi (994.46/km^{2})
- Time zone: UTC-5 (Eastern (EST))
  - Summer (DST): UTC-4 (EDT)
- Area code: 814
- FIPS code: 42-61496
- GNIS feature ID: 1214902

Pleasantville, also known as Alum Bank, is a borough in Bedford County, Pennsylvania, United States. The population was 191 at the 2020 census.

== Geography ==
Pleasantville is located in northwestern Bedford County at 40°10′46″N 78°36′48″W (40.179581, -78.613315). It lies at the northern end of Chestnut Ridge.

Pennsylvania Route 56 passes through the borough, leading southeast 14 miles (23 km) to Bedford, the county seat, and northwestward over the Allegheny Front 24 miles (39 km) to Johnstown. Pennsylvania Route 96 leads south from Pleasantville 10 miles (16 km) to Schellsburg.

According to the United States Census Bureau, Pleasantville has a total area of 0.073 square miles (0.19 km^{2}), all land.

== Demographics ==
Historical population
| Census | Pop. | Note | %± |
|---|---|---|---|
| 1880 | 227 | | — |
| 1890 | 247 | | 8.8% |
| 1900 | 219 | | −11.3% |
| 1910 | 191 | | −12.8% |
| 1920 | 191 | | 0.0% |
| 1930 | 184 | | −3.7% |
| 1940 | 232 | | 26.1% |
| 1950 | 242 | | 4.3% |
| 1960 | 300 | | 24.0% |
| 1970 | 303 | | 1.0% |
| 1980 | 275 | | −9.2% |
| 1990 | 215 | | −21.8% |
| 2000 | 211 | | −1.9% |
| 2010 | 198 | | −6.2% |
| 2020 | 191 | | −3.5% |
| 2021 (est.) | 194 | | 1.6% |

As of the census of 2000, there were 211 people, 83 households, and 59 families residing in the borough. The population density was 3,057.8 inhabitants per square mile (1,180.6/km^{2}). There were 87 housing units at an average density of 1,260.8 units per square mile (486.8 units/km^{2}). The racial makeup of the borough was 95.73% White, 2.37% African American, and 1.90% from two or more races. Hispanic or Latino of any race were 0.95% of the population.

There were 83 households, out of which 32.5% had children under the age of 18 living with them, 57.8% were married couples living together, 8.4% had a female householder with no husband present, and 28.9% were non-families. 27.7% of all households were made up of individuals, and 10.8% had someone living alone who was 65 years of age or older. The average household size was 2.54 and the average family size was 3.15.

In the borough the population was spread out, with 27.5% under the age of 18, 6.2% from 18 to 24, 29.9% from 25 to 44, 18.0% from 45 to 64, and 18.5% who were 65 years of age or older. The median age was 37 years. For every 100 females there were 85.1 males. For every 100 females age 18 and over, there were 91.3 males.

The median income for a household in the borough was $22,917, and the median income for a family was $29,375. Males had a median income of $26,250 versus $23,125 for females. The per capita income for the borough was $11,312. About 15.7% of families and 17.8% of the population were below the poverty line, including 20.4% of those under the age of eighteen and 30.0% of those sixty five or over.
