= Lincoln Township, Bedford County, Pennsylvania =

Township in Pennsylvania, US

Coordinates: 40°11′51″N 78°35′48″W

- Township
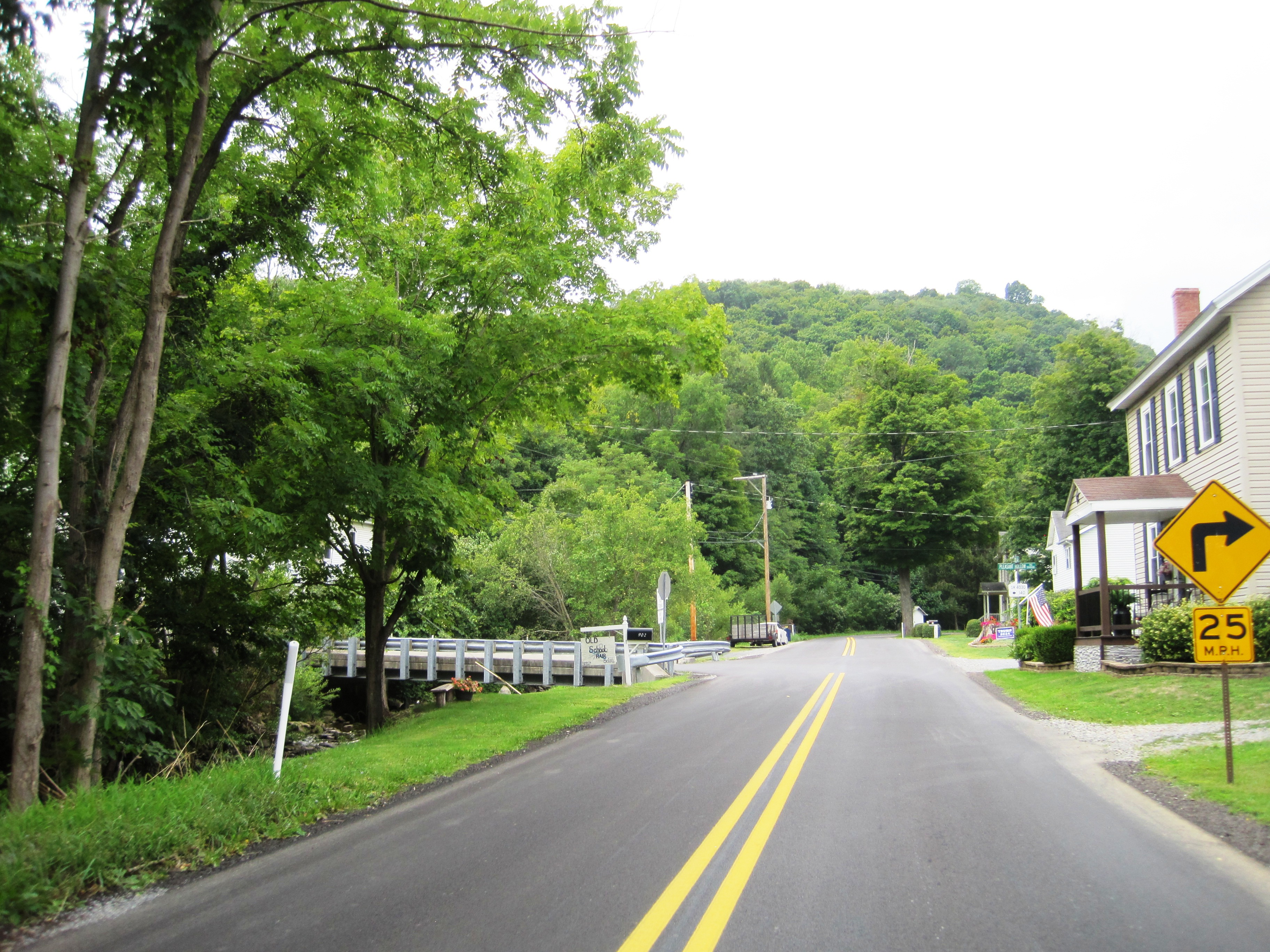
- Village of Lovely within Lincoln Township

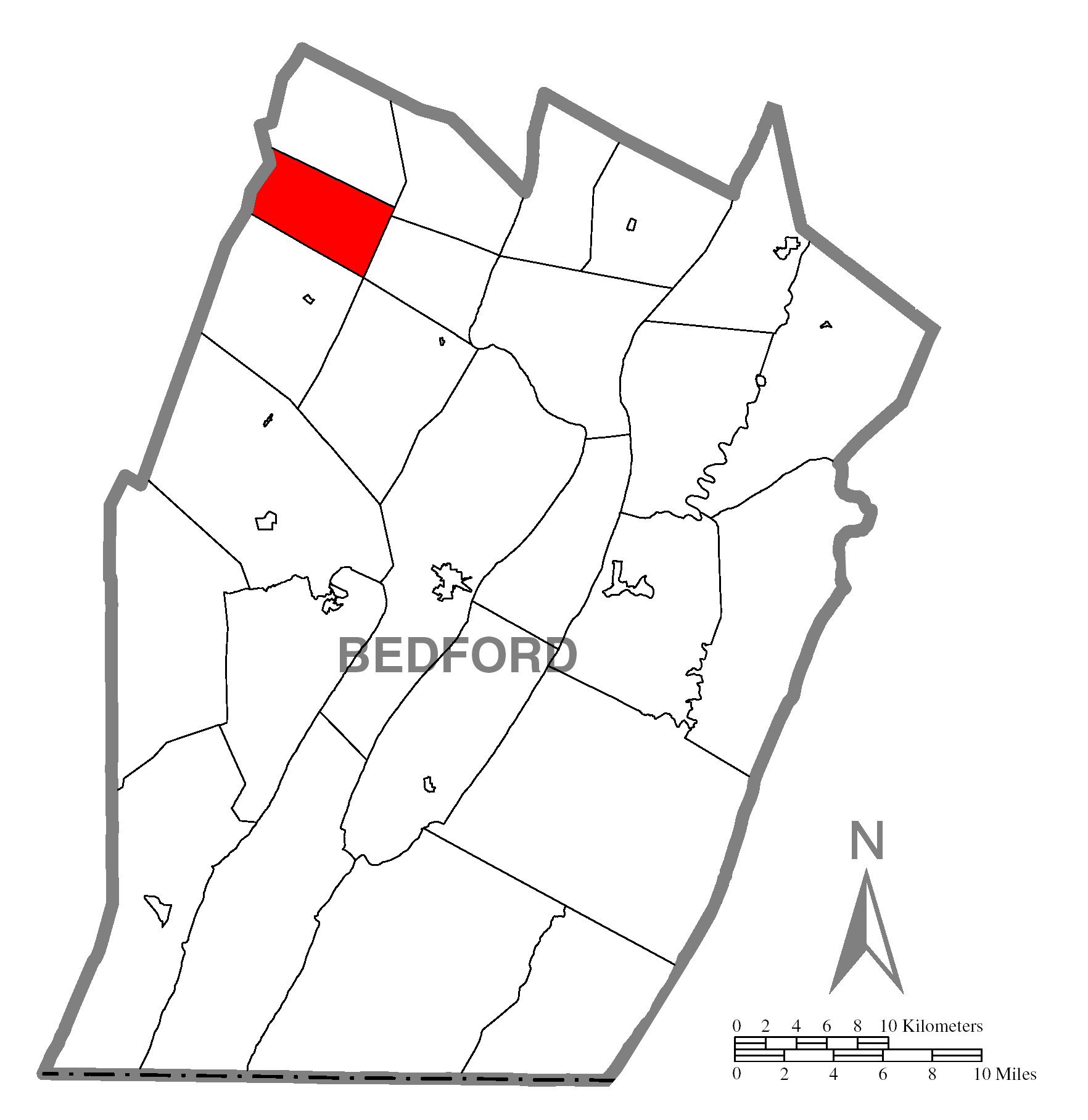
- Map of Bedford County, Pennsylvania highlighting Lincoln Township

- Map of Bedford County, Pennsylvania
- Country: United States
- State: Pennsylvania
- County: Bedford
- Settled: 1794
- Incorporated: 1899

Area
  - Total: 16.29 sq mi (42.20 km^{2})
  - Land: 16.28 sq mi (42.17 km^{2})
  - Water: 0.015 sq mi (0.04 km^{2})

Population (2020)
  - Total: 389 ▼
  - Estimate (2023): 384
  - Density: 24.6/sq mi (9.49/km^{2})
- Time zone: UTC-5 (Eastern (EST))
  - Summer (DST): UTC-4 (EDT)
- Area code: 814
- FIPS code: 42-009-43416

Lincoln Township is a township that is located in Bedford County, Pennsylvania, United States. The population was 389 at the time of the 2020 census.

== Geography ==
Lincoln Township is located in northwestern Bedford County. According to the United States Census Bureau, the township has a total area of 16.3 square miles (42.2 km^{2}), of which 0.015 square miles (0.04 km^{2}), or 0.09%, is water.

== Recreation ==
A portion of the Blue Knob State Park, a portion of the Gallitzin State Forest (Babcock Division) and a portion of the Pennsylvania State Game Lands Number 26 is located along the northwest border of township.

== Demographics ==
Historical population
Census	Pop.	Note	%±
2010	425		—
2020	389		−8.5%
2023 (est.)	384		−1.3%
U.S. Decennial Census

As of the census of 2000, there were 380 people, 142 households, and 112 families residing in the township.

The population density was 23.4 people per square mile (9.0 people/km^{2}). There were 177 housing units at an average density of 10.9 units per square mile (4.2 units/km^{2}).

The racial makeup of the township was 98.42% White, 0.79% African American, and 0.79% from two or more races. Hispanic or Latino of any race were 1.58% of the population.

There were 142 households, out of which 32.4% had children under the age of eighteen living with them; 71.8% were married couples living together, 4.2% had a female householder with no husband present, and 21.1% were non-families. 18.3% of all households were made up of individuals, and 7.0% had someone living alone who was sixty-five years of age or older.

The average household size was 2.68 and the average family size was 3.04.

Within the township, the population was spread out, with 24.5% of residents who were under the age of eighteen, 7.6% who were aged eighteen to twenty-four, 27.4% who were aged twenty-five to forty-four, 21.1% who were aged forty-five to sixty-four, and 19.5% who were sixty-five years of age or older. The median age was thirty-nine years.

For every one hundred females, there were 108.8 males. For every one hundred females who were aged eighteen or older, there were 108.0 males.

The median income for a household in the township was $25,962, and the median income for a family was $32,500. Males had a median income of $26,583 compared with that of $16,875 for females.

The per capita income for the township was $13,847.

Approximately 8.7% of families and 13.0% of the population were living below the poverty line, including 22.0% of those who were under the age of eighteen and 15.3% of those who were aged sixty-five or older.
