= King Township, Pennsylvania =

Township in Pennsylvania, US

Coordinates: 40°08′53″N 78°28′04″W

- Township
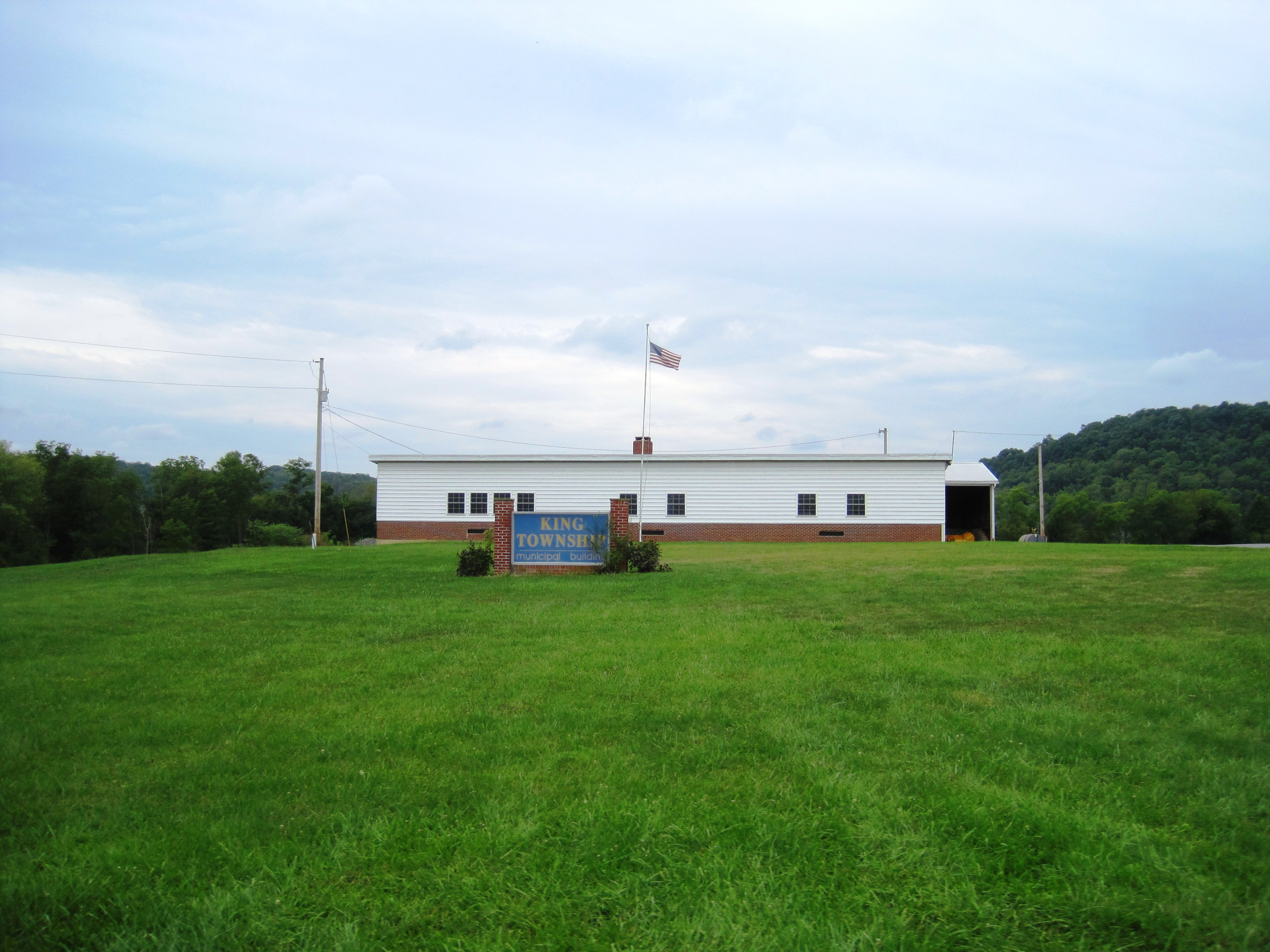
- Town hall

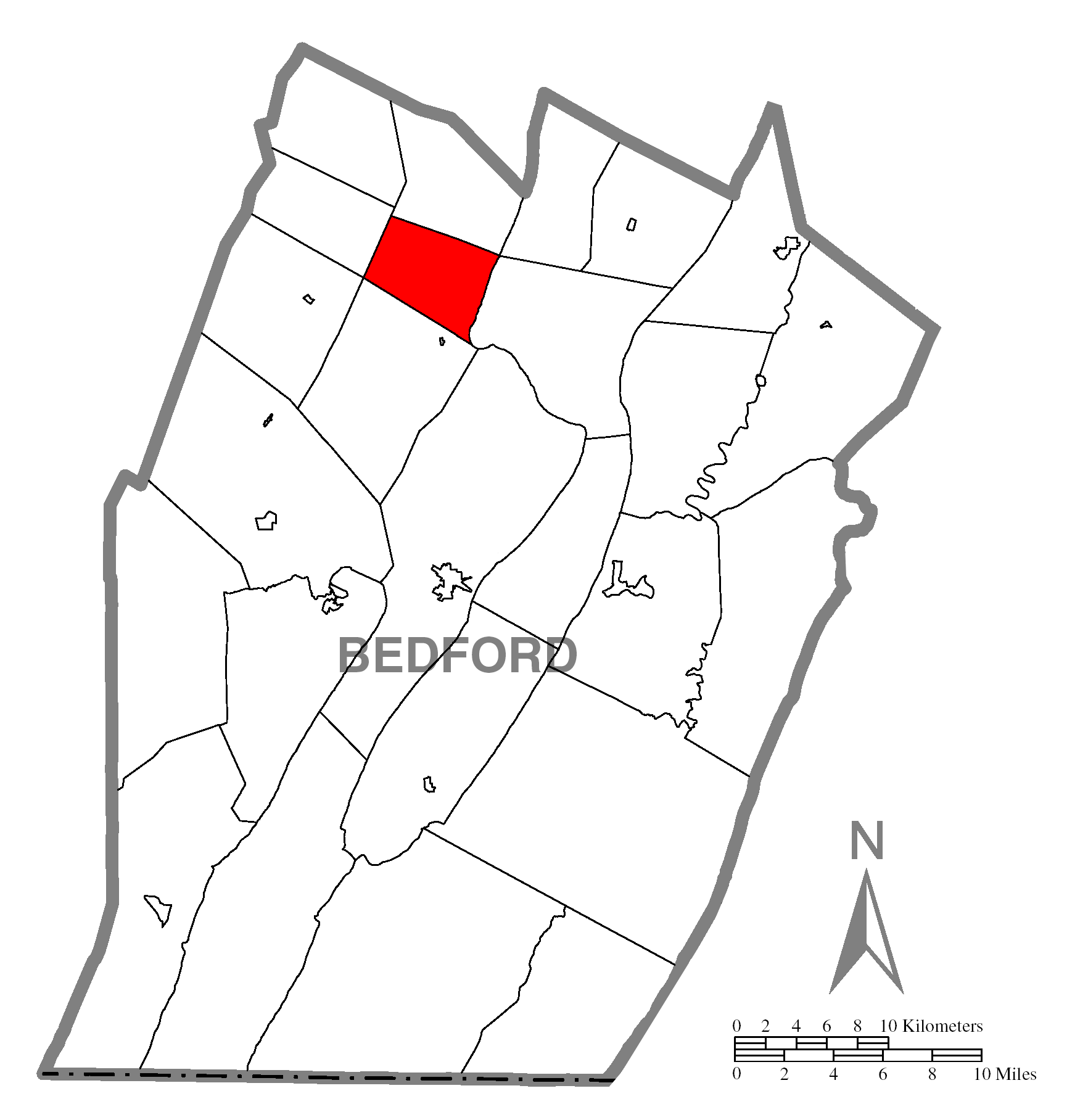
- Map of Bedford County, Pennsylvania highlighting King Township

- Map of Bedford County, Pennsylvania
- Country: United States
- State: Pennsylvania
- County: Bedford
- Settled: 1760
- Incorporated: 1876

Area
  - Total: 15.73 sq mi (40.74 km^{2})
  - Land: 15.70 sq mi (40.65 km^{2})
  - Water: 0.035 sq mi (0.09 km^{2})

Population (2020)
  - Total: 1,178 ▼
  - Estimate (2023): 1,169
  - Density: 76.4/sq mi (29.49/km^{2})
- Time zone: UTC-5 (Eastern (EST))
  - Summer (DST): UTC-4 (EDT)
- Area code: 814
- FIPS code: 42-009-39720

King Township is a township that is located in Bedford County, Pennsylvania, United States. The population was 1,178 at the time of the 2020 census.

== Geography ==
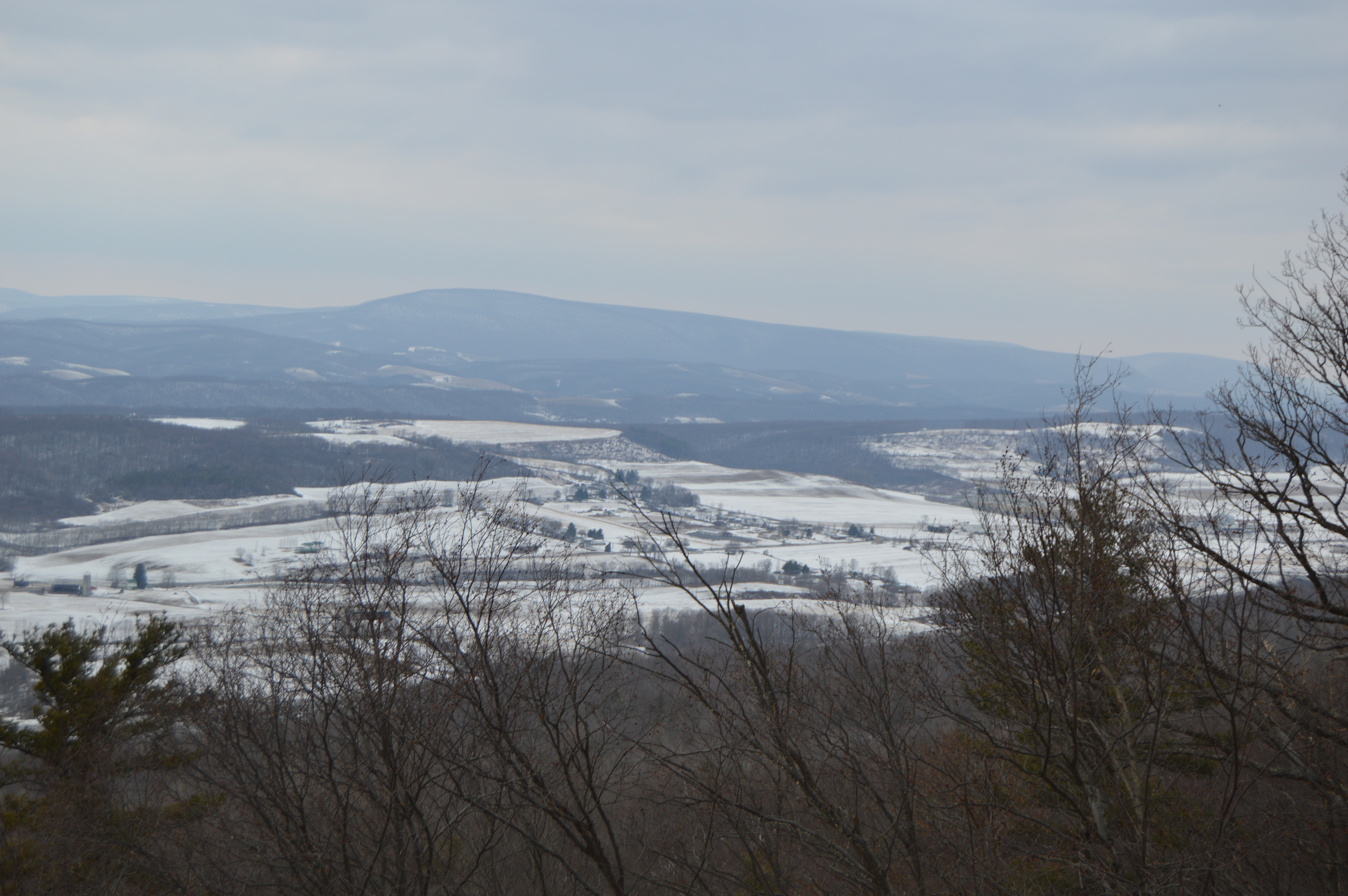
Snow-covered fields in late March, seen from Dunning Mountain

King Township is located in northern Bedford County. According to the United States Census Bureau, the township has a total area of 15.73 square miles (40.74 km^{2}), of which 0.035 square miles (0.09 km^{2}), or 0.22%, is water.

== Demographics ==
Historical population
Census	Pop.	Note	%±
2000	1,264		—
2010	1,238		−2.1%
2020	1,178		−4.8%
2023 (est.)	1,169		−0.8%
U.S. Decennial Census

As of the census of 2010, there were 1,238 people, 491 households, and 365 families residing in the township.

The population density was 81.8 inhabitants per square mile (31.6/km^{2}). There were 531 housing units at an average density of 33.3 units per square mile (12.9 units/km^{2}).

The racial makeup of the township was 99.7% White, 0.04% African American, 0.00% Native American, 0.0% from other races, and 0.3 from two or more races. Hispanic or Latino of any race were 0.3 of the population.

There were 472 households, out of which 35.0% had children under the age of eighteen living with them; 64.0% were married couples living together, 8.1% had a female householder with no husband present, and 23.9% were non-families. 20.6% of all households were made up of individuals, and 10.8% had someone living alone who was sixty-five years of age or older.

The average household size was 2.68 and the average family size was 3.08.

Within the township, the population was spread out, with 25.2% who were under the age of eighteen, 8.7% who were aged eighteen to twenty-four, 28.3% who were aged twenty-five to forty-four, 24.1% who were aged forty-five to sixty-four, and 13.6% who were sixty-five years of age or older. The median age was thirty-seven years.

For every one hundred females there were 97.5 males. For every one hundred females who were aged eighteen or older, there were 97.7 males.

The median income for a household in the township was $34,464, and the median income for a family was $38,295. Males had a median income of $28,295 compared with that of $21,607 for females.

The per capita income for the township was $15,102.

Approximately 10.0% of families and 12.4% of the population were living below the poverty line, including 18.0% of those who were under the age of eighteen and 17.2% of those who were aged sixty-five or older.
