= Shawnee State Park (Pennsylvania) =

State park in Bedford County, Pennsylvania

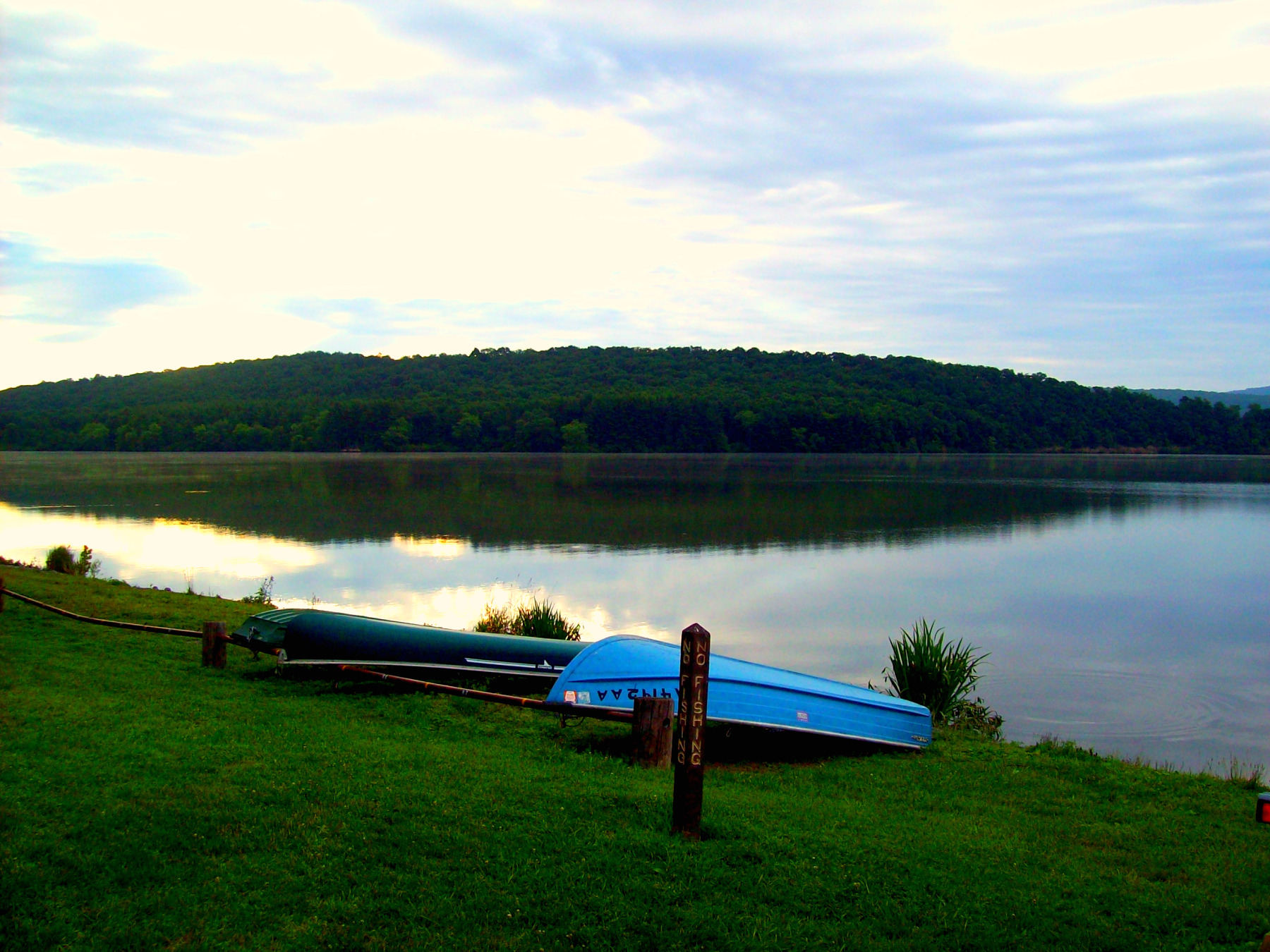

- Location within Pennsylvania Location within the United States
- Interactive map of Shawnee State Park
- Location: Bedford County, Pennsylvania, United States
- Coordinates: 40°01′34″N 78°38′08″W
- Area: 3,983 acres (1,612 ha)
- Elevation: 1,280 feet (390 m)
- Established: 1951
- Administrator: Pennsylvania Department of Conservation and Natural Resources
- Website: Official website
- Pennsylvania State Parks

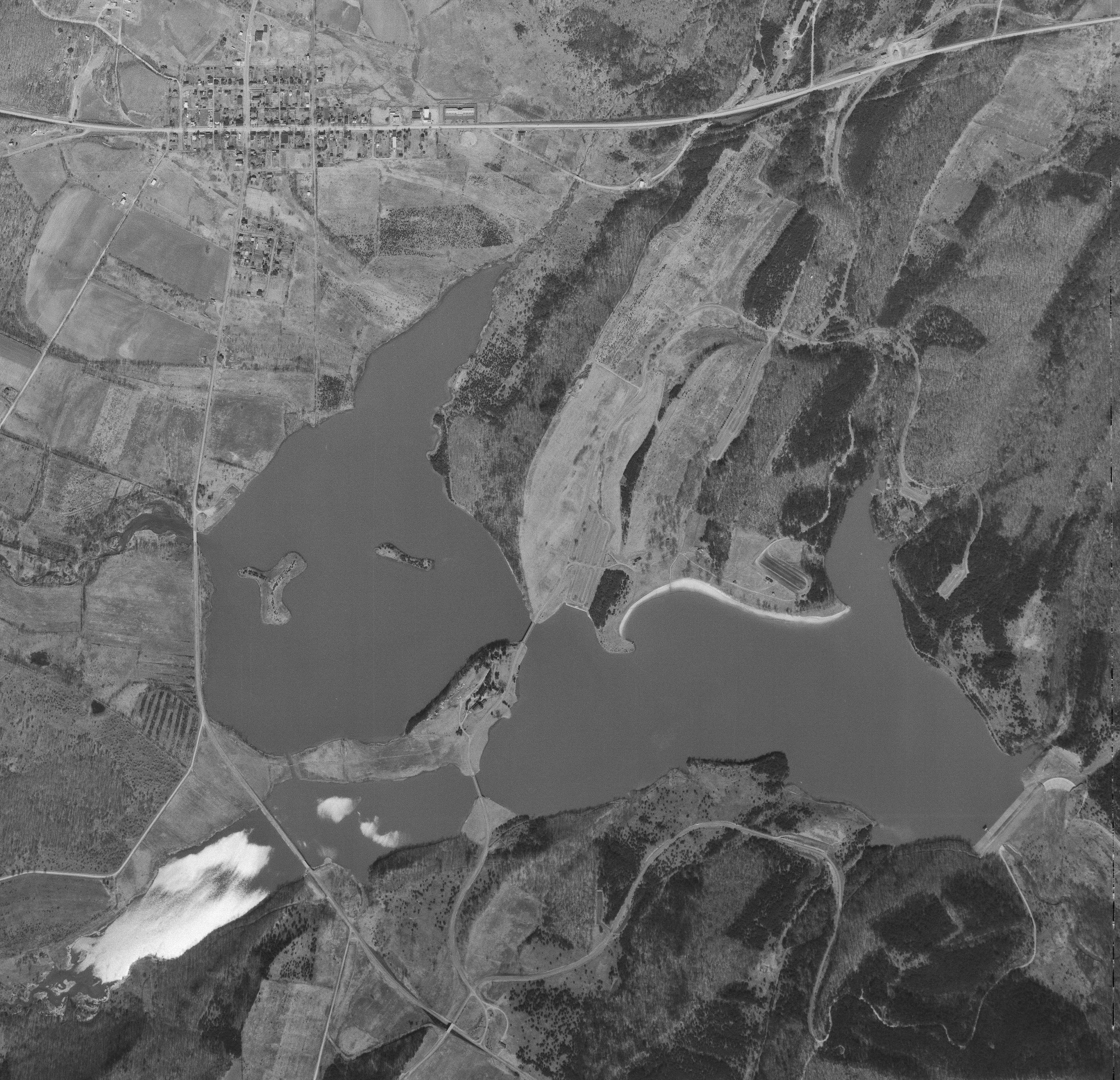
Shawnee Lake in 1966

Shawnee State Park is a 3,983-acre (1,612 ha) Pennsylvania state park in Juniata and Napier Townships, Bedford County, Pennsylvania in the United States. Shawnee Lake, a 451-acre (183 ha) warm water reservoir, is at the center of the park as its main attraction. The park's main entrance is just east of Schellsburg, along U.S. Route 30 and about 10 miles (16 km) west of the county seat of Bedford. The park is also easily accessed via State Route 31 and by State Route 96 (Shawnee Road).

== History ==
Shawnee State Park is named for Shawnee Creek, a stream which flowed through the area and was dammed to create the recreational lake at the park. The creek was named for the Shawnee, a Native American tribe that once lived in many parts of Pennsylvania, Ohio, and Kentucky. They were forced from their lands in Ohio and Kentucky by invading Iroquois, the powerful five-nation confederacy based in western New York. Later the Shawnee were forced west out of Ohio by encroachment by settlers of the Thirteen Colonies.

The area surrounding the park was used as a trade route and military road during the French and Indian War (also known as the Seven Years' War). General John Forbes built the Forbes Road (which the modern-day U.S. Highway 30 parallels) to send supplies from the ports in Philadelphia and Baltimore to a force of British soldiers under his command as he tried to capture Fort Duquesne from the French in 1758.

The park was authorized by the 1947 Session of the Legislature of Pennsylvania. Construction of the dam began in 1949 and it was completed in 1951, when the park opened to the public.

The lake was declared "full" on March 4, 1951, when water began pouring down the breast of the dam.

The first person to drown in the lake was Robert Mowry, age 17, of Schellsburg, on June 28, 1951, only a few months after the park opened.

== Geology ==
The bedrock at the park consists of the Devonian Brallier Formation, Harrell Formation, Mahantango Formation, and Marcellus Formation. These formations are all dominantly shales and siltstones, which dip to the southeast at approximately 20-30 degrees. The park lies at the southern end of Chestnut Ridge, which is a broad, doubly plunging anticline. Some of the shales (probably the Harrell Formation) outcrop along the shores of the lake, particularly the southern shore near the dam.

== Staying overnight ==
=== Camping ===
Shawnee State Park has a 293 site campground. The sites are modern with some electric hook-ups. There is a centrally located bathhouse with flush toilets, hot showers and a sanitary dump station at the campground. The camp store sells fire wood, charcoal and other camping supplies. Camping season begins with trout season in mid-April and ends at the conclusion of deer season in late December.

=== Shawnee Lodge ===
Shawnee Lodge is the former home of John Bowman. Bowman was president and chancellor of the University of Pittsburgh and was instrumental in the construction of the Cathedral of Learning on Pitt's Oakland Campus in Pittsburgh. Bowman owned the barn, buildings and houses that are now surrounded by Shawnee Lake. The lodge on the island is open for rent year-round. It has a modern kitchen, a bathroom, living room, sitting room and four bedrooms.

== Recreation ==
Shawnee State Park is open for year-round recreation. There are 15 miles (24 km) of trails open for hiking and some are open to biking. Five pavilions are spread throughout the park along with numerous picnic tables.

=== Shawnee Lake ===
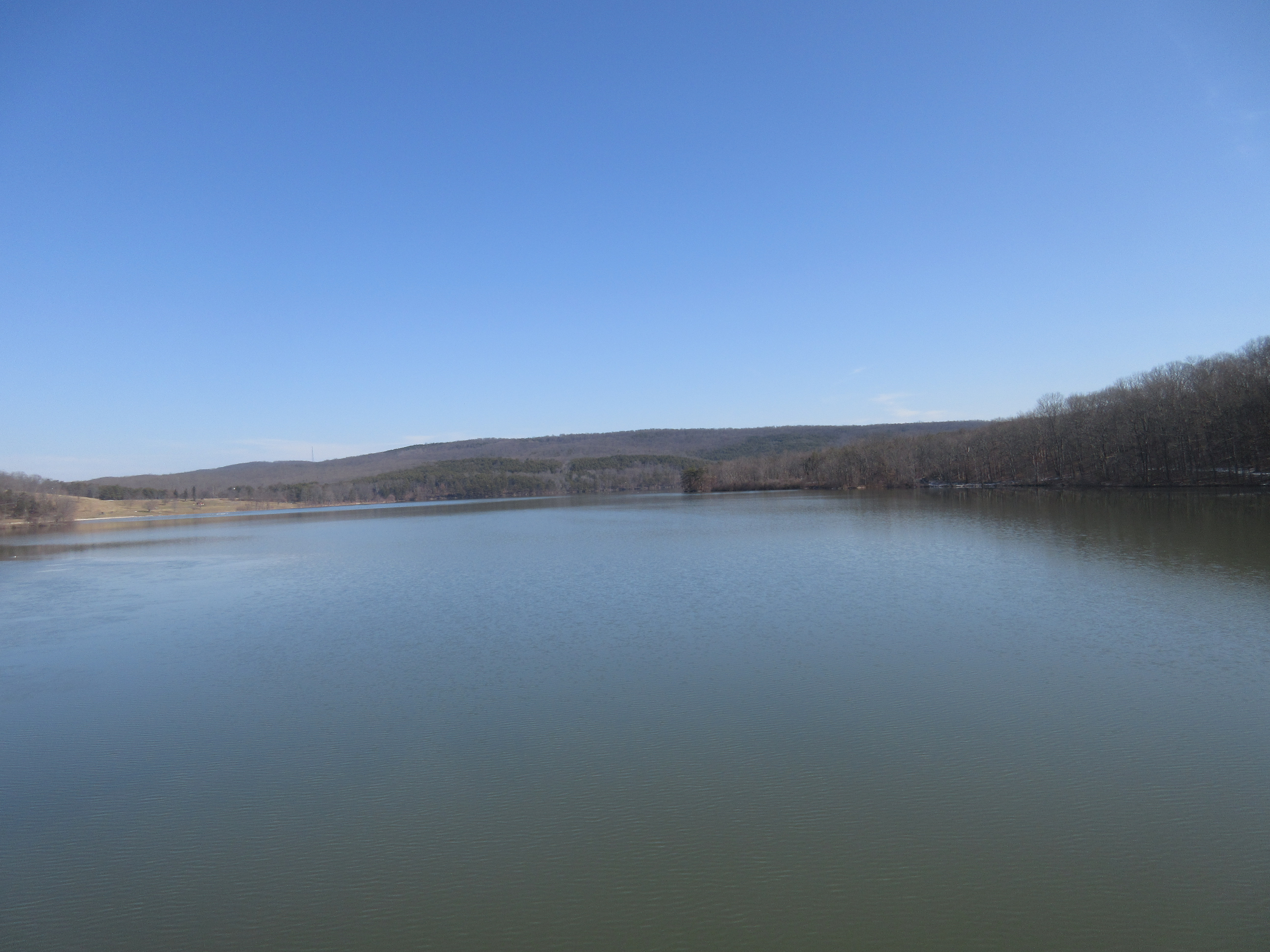
View of the lake on a clear winter day.

Shawnee Lake is a warm water fishery. It is stocked with game fish by the Pennsylvania Fish and Boat Commission. The common fish are walleye, pickerel, smallmouth and largemouth bass, northern pike, muskellunge, catfish, crappie, yellow perch, bluegill, bullhead, sucker and carp. While pleasantly warm for swimming, and supportive of the above fish, Shawnee lake is too warm to support a trout population. There are three boat launches at Shawnee Lake for electric and non powered boats only. Gas powered boats are prohibited at Shawnee State Park. All boats must have a current registration with any state or a launch permit from the Pennsylvania Fish and Boat Commission. The beach at Shawnee State Park is open daily from Memorial Day weekend until Labor Day weekend. Beginning in 2008 lifeguards will not be posted at the beach.

=== Hunting ===
Hunting is permitted on over 3,000 acres (1,200 ha) of Shawnee State Park. The hunting of groundhogs is prohibited. Hunters are expected to follow the rules and regulations of the Pennsylvania Game Commission. The primary game species are squirrels, white-tailed deer, rabbits, and ruffed grouse.
