= Bedford County, Pennsylvania =

County in Pennsylvania, United States

- County
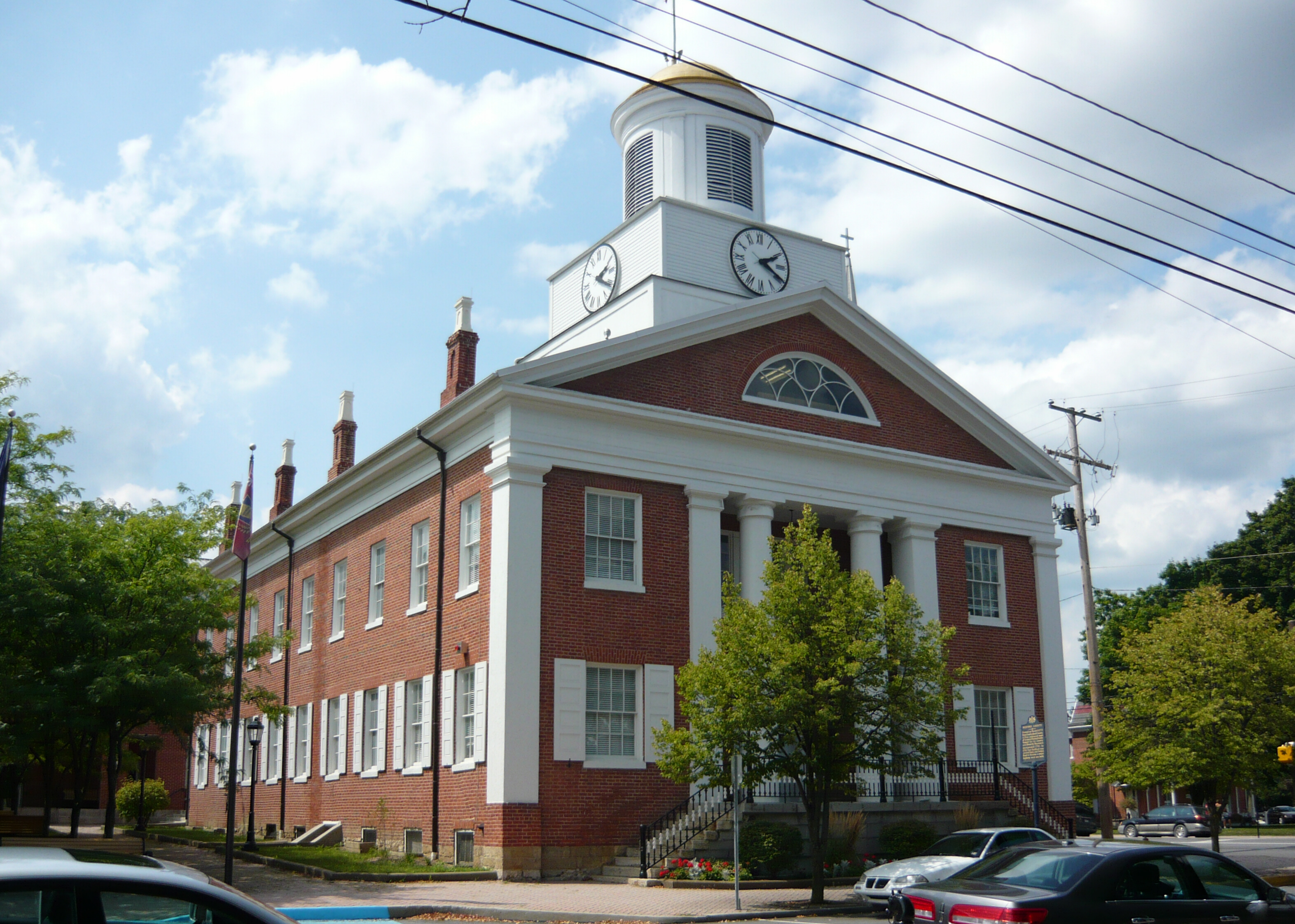
- Bedford County Courthouse

- Flag Seal

- Location within the U.S. state of Pennsylvania
- Coordinates: 40°01′N 78°29′W
- Country: United States
- State: Pennsylvania
- Founded: March 9, 1771
- Named for: Fort Bedford
- Seat: Bedford
- Largest borough: Bedford

Area
  - Total: 1,017 sq mi (2,630 km^{2})
  - Land: 1,012 sq mi (2,620 km^{2})
  - Water: 4.6 sq mi (12 km^{2})

Population (2020)
  - Total: 47,577
  - Estimate (2025): 47,480 ▼
  - Density: 47/sq mi (18/km^{2})
- Time zone: UTC−5 (Eastern)
  - Summer (DST): UTC−4 (EDT)
- Congressional district: 13th
- Website: bedfordcountypa.org

Pennsylvania Historical Marker
- Designated: October 17, 1982

Bedford County is a county in the Commonwealth of Pennsylvania. As of the 2020 census, the population was 47,577. The county seat is Bedford. The county is part of the Southwest region of the commonwealth. (Note: Includes Westmoreland, Cambria, Fayette, Blair, Indiana, Somerset, Bedford, Huntingdon, Greene and Fulton Counties)

== History ==
=== 18th century ===
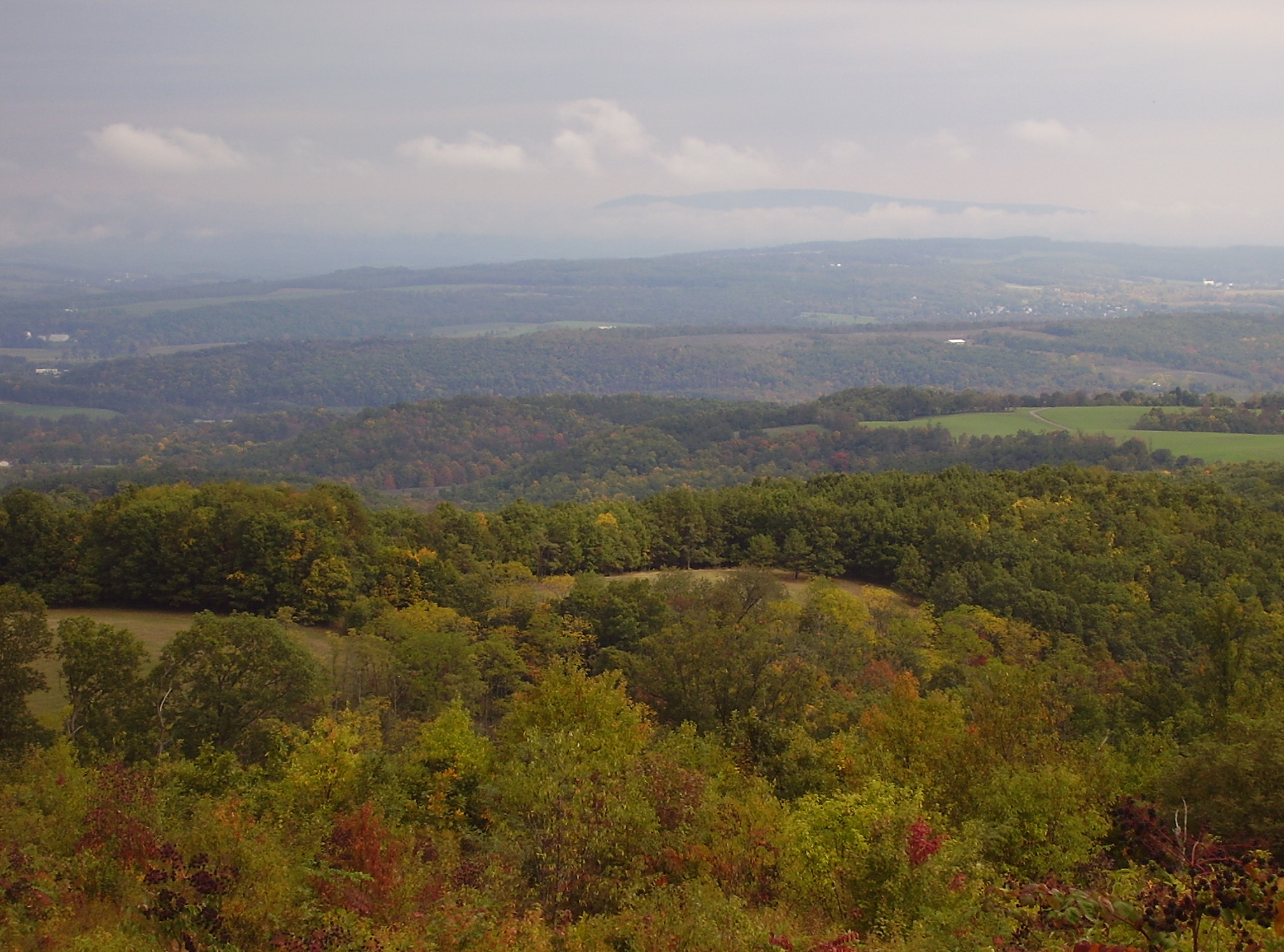
View from Glade Pike on Dry Ridge

According to historians in the 1930's, "in 1750, Robert MacRay, a Scots-Irish immigrant, opened the first trading post in Raystown (which is now Bedford) on the land that is now Bedford County." This information has since been proven incorrect.

John Wray, the trader, established his trading post about two miles east of the site of Fort Bedford around 1740. The trading post, consisting of two or three buildings surrounded by a fence, was called a 'town'. The word 'town' was derived from the Old English 'Tun', which itself was derived from the Old German 'Zaun' meaning a fence or wall. John Wray was not Robert MacRay. The historian John H. P. Adams misread the Act erecting Bedford County out of Cumberland County, on which it was noted that Robert MacRay was one of the four men chosen to 'walk the boundary' and confirm the new county's boundary line. The name 'MacRay' is not a patrynomic of the name 'Wray' meaning that the two are distinct family names and not associated. John H. P. Adams' mistake has been perpetuated, unfortunately.

It should also be noted that the claim has been made that the village of Bedford was originally the village of Raystown. That is incorrect. When Henry Bouquet brought the British Army of General John Forbes into the region, there existed no village on the bluff overlooking the Juniata River, about two miles west of John Wray's trading post.

The early Anglo-American settlers had a difficult time dealing with raids from Native Americans. Native Americans became allied with the French in the North American theater of the war, known as the French and Indian War, or the Seven Years' War between those nations in Europe. The trading post of John Wray gave its name to the encampment made by the British Army under General john Forbes, but led in the field by Colonel Henry Bouquet. While Bouquet was having the fort constructed on the bluff overlooking the branch of the Juniata River, it was unnamed and Bouquet wrote all of his letters with some variations as from "camp near Raystown". The fort, has erroneously been said to have been named "Fort Raystown" but it was not named anything until it was named "Fort Bedford" prior to December 1758.

In 1759, after the capture of Fort Duquesne in Allegheny County, on the Allegheny and Monongahela rivers, English colonists built a road between the fort (which was renamed as Fort Pitt) to the newly built Fort Bedford in Raystown. The English defeated the French in the war and took over their territories in North America east of the Mississippi River. Treaties with the Indians opened more land for future peaceful settlement.

This road followed and improved on ancient Indian trails. In later years it was widened and paved as "Forbes Road"; it is now Route 30. When the Pennsylvania Turnpike was built, this interstate toll road became the main highway through Bedford County.

Bedford County was created on March 9, 1771, from part of Cumberland County and named in honor of Fort Bedford. The 1767 Mason–Dixon line had stabilized the southern border with Maryland. In the aftermath of the American Revolution, the population increased largely due to emigration. Within a lifetime Old Bedford County was greatly reduced from its original boundaries. Huntingdon County was created on September 20, 1787, mainly from the north part of Bedford County, plus an addition of territory on the east (Big Valley, Tuscarora Valley) from Cumberland County. Somerset County was created from part of Bedford County on April 17, 1795. Centre was created on February 13, 1800, from parts of Huntingdon, Lycoming, Mifflin, and Northumberland counties. Cambria County was created on March 26, 1804, from parts of Bedford, Huntingdon, and Somerset Counties. Blair County was created on February 26, 1846, from parts of Huntingdon and Bedford Counties. Finally Fulton County was created on April 19, 1850, from part of Bedford County, setting the county at its current boundaries.

The land was developed into lush farms with woodlands. It was developed as a trading center on the way to Pittsburgh and farther west of Pennsylvania. In 1794, President George Washington came to the county in response to the Whiskey Rebellion.

=== 19th century ===
In the late 19th century, the Bedford Springs Hotel became an important site for wealthy vacationers. It was built near natural springs that had been important to the Native Americans for hundreds of years. During the administration of President James Buchanan, he moved much of his administration to the hotel, which became the informal summer White House. The U.S. Supreme Court met at the hotel once. It was the only time that the high court met outside of the capital.

During the late 19th century, the county had a population boom, with the number of people doubling between 1870 and 1890. Railroads constructed through the town connected the county with the mining industry. The story of the Lost Children of the Alleghenies originates from Blue Knob State Park in the county.

== Geography ==
According to the U.S. Census Bureau, the county has a total area of 1,017 square miles (2,630 km^{2}), of which 1,012 square miles (2,620 km^{2}) is land and 4.6 square miles (12 km^{2}) (0.5%) is water. It has a humid continental climate (Dfa/Dfb) and average monthly temperatures in Bedford borough range from 28.1 °F in January to 72.0 °F in July. Bedford County is one of the 423 counties served by the Appalachian Regional Commission, and it is identified as part of "Greater Appalachia" by Colin Woodard in his book American Nations: A History of the Eleven Rival Regional Cultures of North America.

=== Features ===
- Evitts Mountain
- Morrison Cove
- Tussey Mountain
- Blue Knob, highest mountain in the county at approximately 3,120 feet (950 m)

=== Adjacent counties ===
- Blair County (north)
- Huntingdon County (northeast)
- Fulton County (east)
- Allegany County, Maryland (south)
- Somerset County (west)
- Cambria County (northwest)

== Geology ==
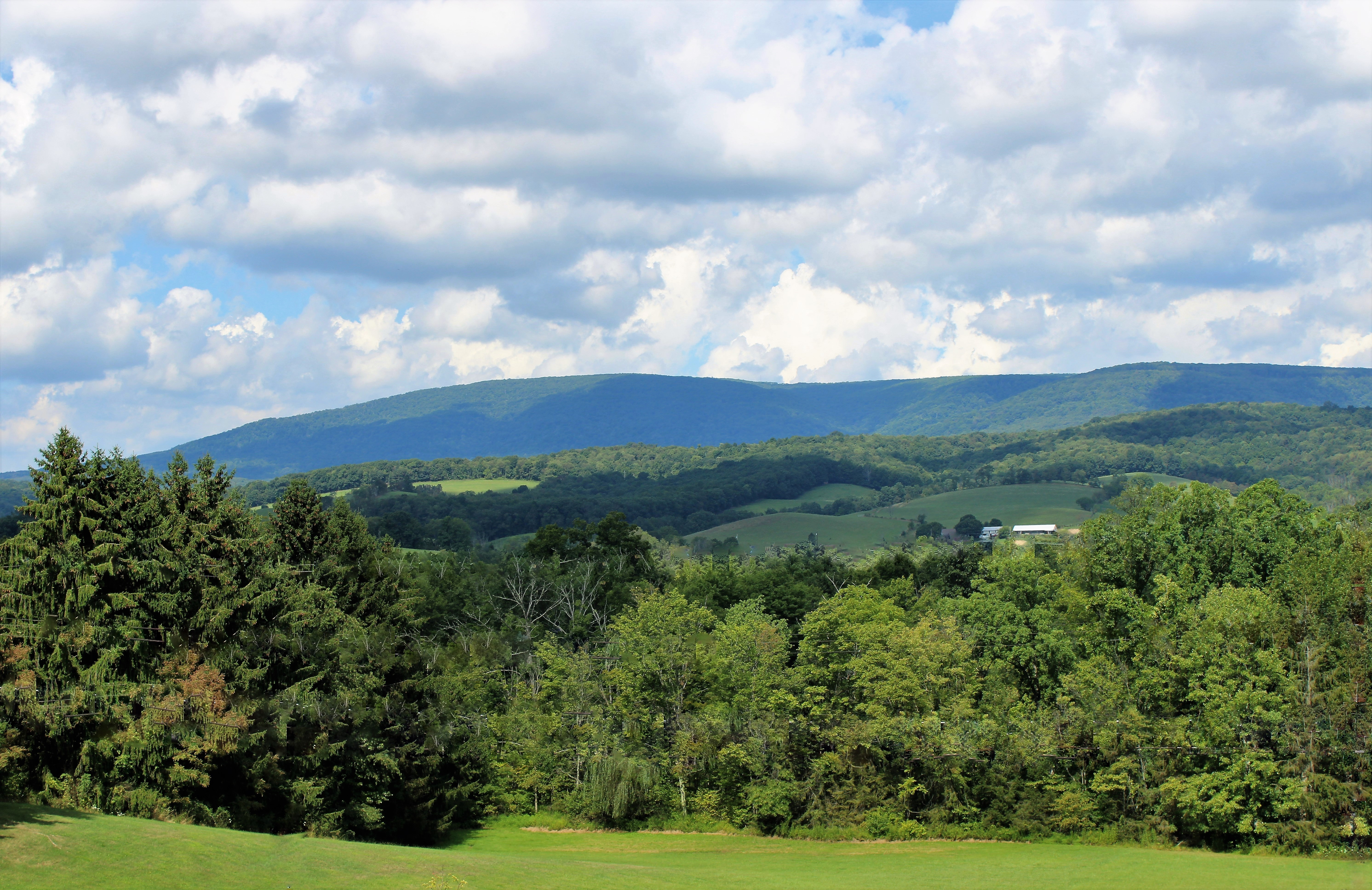
Blue Knob, the most northern 3,000 footer in the Allegheny Mountain Range

Bedford County is situated along the western border of the Ridge and Valley physiographic province, which is characterized by folded and faulted sedimentary rocks of early to middle Paleozoic age. The northwestern border of the county is approximately at the Allegheny Front, a geological boundary between the Ridge and Valley Province and the Allegheny Plateau (characterized by relatively flat-lying sedimentary rocks of late Paleozoic age).

The stratigraphic record of sedimentary rocks within the county spans from the Cambrian Warrior Formation to the Pennsylvanian Conemaugh Group (in the Broad Top area). No igneous or metamorphic rocks of any kind exist within the county.

The primary mountains within the county (From west to east: Wills, Evitts, Dunning, and Tussey mountains) extend from the southern border with Maryland to the northeast into Blair County, and are held up by the Silurian Tuscarora Formation, made of quartz sandstone and conglomerate. Chestnut Ridge is a broad anticline held up by the Devonian Ridgeley Member of the Old Port Formation, also made of sandstone and conglomerate. Broad Top, located north of Breezewood, is a plateau of relatively flat-lying rocks that are stratigraphically higher, and thus younger (Mississippian and Pennsylvanian), than most of the other rocks within the county (Cambrian through Devonian). Broad Top extends into Huntingdon County to the north and Fulton County to the east.

The Raystown Branch of the Juniata River is the main drainage in the northern two-thirds of the county. The river flows to the east through the mountains within the county through several water gaps caused by a group of faults trending east–west through the central part of the county. The river then turns north and flows into Raystown Lake in Huntingdon County. The southern third of the county is drained by several tributaries of the Potomac River. Both the Potomac and Juniata rivers are part of the Chesapeake Bay Watershed.

Several limestone quarries exist in Bedford County, most of which are owned and operated by New Enterprise Stone and Lime Company. Quarry locations include Ashcom, New Paris, Kilcoin, and Sproul.

Two coal fields exist within Bedford County. One is the Broad Top Field in the northeastern corner of the county, and the other is the Georges Creek Field along the southwestern border. Both fields contain bituminous coal. There are abandoned mines in both areas and acid mine drainage is an environmental problem in the Broad Top area, where several fishless streams exist as a result of the discharge from the abandoned mines.

Natural gas fields and storage areas exist in southeastern Bedford County, primarily within folded Devonian rocks south of Breezewood. Another deep gas field exists in the vicinity of Blue Knob on the border with Blair County to the north.

== Law and government ==
=== County commissioners ===
- Mike Stiles, Chairman, Republican
- JR Winck, Vice Chairman, Republican
- Deb Baughman, Secretary, Democratic

=== Row Offices ===
- Ashlan Clark, District Attorney Republican
- Wayne Emerick, Jr., Sheriff Republican
- Melissa Cottle, Treasurer, Republican
- Sheri Lowery, Prothonotary & Clerk of Courts, Republican
- Russell Styer, Coroner, Republican
- Alyssa Miller, Register of Wills & Recorder of Deeds , Republican
- Carol Miller, Auditor, Republican
- Mary Rowzer, Auditor, Republican
- Robert Rolland, Auditor, Democratic

=== State senate ===
- Pat Stefano, Republican, Pennsylvania's 35th Senatorial District

=== State House of Representatives ===
- Jesse Topper, Republican, Pennsylvania's 78th Representative District

=== United States House of Representatives ===
- John Joyce, Republican, Pennsylvania's 13th congressional district

=== United States Senate ===
- John Fetterman, Democrat
- Dave McCormick, Republican

=== Politics ===
Bedford County is overwhelmingly Republican, with that party winning the vote of nearly all presidential elections, recently by great margins. In 2016, 2020, and 2024, it was Donald Trump’s second strongest county in Pennsylvania, only after neighboring Fulton County. The last time it voted for a Democrat in any election was in Bob Casey Jr.'s 2004 State Treasurer landslide.

United States presidential election results for Bedford County, Pennsylvania
Year	Republican		Democratic		Third party(ies)	
Year	No.	%	No.	%	No.	%
1888	4,287	52.19%	3,822	46.52%	106	1.29%
1892	4,301	53.08%	3,684	45.46%	118	1.46%
1896	4,983	57.17%	3,605	41.36%	128	1.47%
1900	4,790	57.24%	3,445	41.17%	133	1.59%
1904	5,364	61.16%	3,042	34.68%	365	4.16%
1908	4,784	57.03%	3,196	38.10%	408	4.86%
1912	1,140	15.52%	2,694	36.68%	3,510	47.79%
1916	3,729	50.79%	3,263	44.44%	350	4.77%
1920	5,800	61.67%	2,594	27.58%	1,011	10.75%
1924	6,154	61.72%	2,315	23.22%	1,502	15.06%
1928	9,602	81.60%	1,966	16.71%	199	1.69%
1932	6,597	54.29%	5,075	41.76%	480	3.95%
1936	9,014	49.58%	8,937	49.16%	230	1.27%
1940	8,864	54.38%	7,388	45.32%	49	0.30%
1944	8,703	62.40%	5,175	37.11%	68	0.49%
1948	6,028	61.02%	3,851	38.98%	0	0.00%
1952	9,419	63.93%	5,255	35.67%	60	0.41%
1956	11,423	65.37%	6,038	34.55%	13	0.07%
1960	12,542	67.42%	6,030	32.41%	32	0.17%
1964	7,968	46.47%	9,165	53.45%	14	0.08%
1968	10,482	63.46%	4,725	28.61%	1,311	7.94%
1972	11,243	73.30%	3,836	25.01%	259	1.69%
1976	9,355	57.97%	6,652	41.22%	131	0.81%
1980	10,930	66.57%	4,950	30.15%	539	3.28%
1984	13,085	70.57%	5,424	29.25%	34	0.18%
1988	11,123	65.55%	5,754	33.91%	92	0.54%
1992	9,216	48.98%	5,840	31.04%	3,761	19.99%
1996	10,064	55.52%	5,954	32.85%	2,109	11.63%
2000	13,598	69.97%	5,474	28.17%	363	1.87%
2004	16,606	73.22%	6,016	26.53%	57	0.25%
2008	16,124	71.51%	6,059	26.87%	365	1.62%
2012	16,702	76.79%	4,788	22.01%	260	1.20%
2016	19,552	82.59%	3,645	15.40%	478	2.02%
2020	23,025	83.39%	4,367	15.82%	218	0.79%
2024	23,658	83.84%	4,336	15.37%	224	0.79%

United States Senate election results for Bedford County, Pennsylvania1
Year	Republican		Democratic		Third party(ies)	
Year	No.	%	No.	%	No.	%
1994	9,720	63.04%	5,006	32.46%	694	4.50%
2000	13,791	72.29%	4,810	25.21%	476	2.50%
2006	9,703	58.46%	6,895	41.54%	0	0.00%
2012	15,673	72.65%	5,553	25.74%	347	1.61%
2018	14,044	74.61%	4,567	24.26%	212	1.13%
2024	22,855	81.50%	4,624	16.49%	564	2.01%

United States Senate election results for Bedford County, Pennsylvania3
Year	Republican		Democratic		Third party(ies)	
Year	No.	%	No.	%	No.	%
1992	10,251	55.00%	6,848	36.74%	1,538	8.25%
1998	8,406	70.07%	3,216	26.81%	374	3.12%
2004	14,772	67.34%	5,341	24.35%	1,822	8.31%
2010	12,315	74.90%	4,128	25.10%	0	0.00%
2016	17,739	75.68%	4,356	18.58%	1,344	5.73%
2022	17,954	80.72%	3,796	17.07%	491	2.21%

As of July 17, 2023, there were 32,287 registered voters in Bedford County.

Pennsylvania Gubernatorial election results for Bedford County
Year	Republican		Democratic		Third party(ies)	
Year	No.	%	No.	%	No.	%
1914	3,115	58.02%	1,842	34.31%	412	7.67%
1918	3,456	65.43%	1,602	30.33%	224	4.24%
1922	4,210	63.47%	2,112	31.84%	311	4.69%
1926	5,612	76.40%	1,510	20.56%	224	3.05%
1930	4,895	64.01%	2,342	30.63%	410	5.36%
1934	6,710	47.76%	7,175	51.07%	163	1.16%
1938	7,851	60.04%	5,112	39.09%	114	0.87%
1942	6,220	61.20%	3,845	37.83%	98	0.96%
1946	7,656	59.43%	5,112	39.68%	114	0.88%
1950	6,501	55.44%	5,122	43.68%	104	0.89%
1954	6,842	52.58%	6,114	46.99%	56	0.43%
1958	7,912	54.50%	6,531	44.99%	74	0.51%
1962	9,840	64.91%	5,210	34.37%	110	0.73%
1966	10,079	62.96%	5,796	36.20%	134	0.84%
1970	7,796	55.06%	5,966	42.14%	397	2.80%
1974	7,928	60.37%	5,136	39.11%	69	0.53%
1978	8,147	58.64%	5,690	40.95%	57	0.41%
1982	8,034	56.23%	6,200	43.40%	53	0.37%
1986	8,180	53.88%	6,874	45.28%	127	0.84%
1990	4,876	38.74%	7,709	61.26%	0	0.00%
1994	8,689	55.94%	4,588	29.54%	2,255	14.52%
1998	8,232	68.25%	2,322	19.25%	1,508	12.50%
2002	10,190	68.23%	4,516	30.24%	228	1.53%
2006	10,270	61.71%	6,372	38.29%	0	0.00%
2010	12,873	77.96%	3,639	22.04%	0	0.00%
2014	9,050	65.41%	4,786	34.59%	0	0.00%
2018	14,261	75.60%	4,408	23.37%	194	1.03%
2022	17,198	77.40%	4,721	21.25%	301	1.35%

https://www.bedfordcountypa.org/departments/elections/election_results.php

- Republican: 23,490 (72.75%)
- Democratic: 5,851 (18.12%)
- No Party Affiliation: 1,988 (6.16%)
- Other: 958 (2.97%)
Chart of Voter Registration
1. Republican (72.8%)
2. Democratic (18.1%)
3. Independent (6.16%)
4. Other Parties (2.97%)

== Demographics ==
Historical population
Census	Pop.	Note	%±
1790	13,132		—
1800	12,039		−8.3%
1810	15,746		30.8%
1820	20,248		28.6%
1830	24,502		21.0%
1840	29,335		19.7%
1850	23,052		−21.4%
1860	26,736		16.0%
1870	29,635		10.8%
1880	34,929		17.9%
1890	38,644		10.6%
1900	39,468		2.1%
1910	38,879		−1.5%
1920	38,277		−1.5%
1930	37,309		−2.5%
1940	40,809		9.4%
1950	40,775		−0.1%
1960	42,451		4.1%
1970	42,353		−0.2%
1980	46,784		10.5%
1990	47,919		2.4%
2000	49,976		4.3%
2010	49,762		−0.4%
2020	47,577		−4.4%
2025 (est.)	47,480	▼	−0.2%

=== 2020 census ===
As of the 2020 census, the county had a population of 47,577 and the median age was 47.6 years. 19.5% of residents were under the age of 18 and 23.4% of residents were 65 years of age or older. For every 100 females there were 98.4 males, and for every 100 females age 18 and over there were 97.5 males.

The racial makeup of the county was 95.8% White, 0.4% Black or African American, 0.2% American Indian and Alaska Native, 0.3% Asian, less than 0.1% Native Hawaiian and Pacific Islander, 0.4% from some other race, and 3.0% from two or more races. Hispanic or Latino residents of any race comprised 1.1% of the population.

Bedford County, Pennsylvania – Racial and ethnic composition Note: the US Census treats Hispanic/Latino as an ethnic category. This table excludes Latinos from the racial categories and assigns them to a separate category. Hispanics/Latinos may be of any race.
Race / Ethnicity (NH = Non-Hispanic)	Pop 2000	Pop 2010	Pop 2020	% 2000	% 2010	% 2020
White alone (NH)	49,089	48,535	45,381	98.20%	97.53%	95.38%
Black or African American alone (NH)	167	236	181	0.33%	0.47%	0.38%
Native American or Alaska Native alone (NH)	48	57	66	0.09%	0.11%	0.13%
Asian alone (NH)	142	101	153	0.28%	0.20%	0.32%
Pacific Islander alone (NH)	7	5	0	0.01%	0.01%	0.00%
Other race alone (NH)	15	24	50	0.03%	0.04%	0.10%
Mixed race or Multiracial (NH)	253	354	1,227	0.50%	0.71%	2.57%
Hispanic or Latino (any race)	263	450	519	0.52%	0.90%	1.09%
Total	49,984	49,762	47,577	100.00%	100.00%	100.00%

9.3% of residents lived in urban areas, while 90.7% lived in rural areas.

There were 20,041 households in the county, of which 24.9% had children under the age of 18 living in them. Of all households, 53.7% were married-couple households, 17.5% were households with a male householder and no spouse or partner present, and 22.4% were households with a female householder and no spouse or partner present. About 28.0% of all households were made up of individuals and 14.7% had someone living alone who was 65 years of age or older.

There were 23,489 housing units, of which 14.7% were vacant. Among occupied housing units, 78.1% were owner-occupied and 21.9% were renter-occupied. The homeowner vacancy rate was 1.5% and the rental vacancy rate was 6.8%.

=== 2010 census ===
As of the 2010 census, there were 49,762 people, 20,233 households, and 14,251 families residing in the county. The population density was 49 people per square mile (19 people/km^{2}). There were 23,954 housing units at an average density of 23 per square mile (8.9/km^{2}). The racial makeup of the county was 98.0% White, 0.5% Black or African American, 0.2% Native American, 0.2% Asian, 0.0% Pacific Islander, 0.3% from other races, and 0.8% from two or more races. 0.9% of the population were Hispanic or Latino of any race.

There were 20,233 households, out of which 28.8% had children under the age of 18 living with them, 57.5% were married couples living together, 8.2% had a female householder with no husband present, and 29.6% were non-families. 25.7% of all households were made up of individuals, and 12.5% had someone living alone who was 65 years of age or older. The average household size was 2.43 and the average family size was 2.90.

In the county, the population was spread out, with 21.6% under the age of 18, 7.0% from 18 to 24, 23.0% from 25 to 44, 29.4% from 45 to 64, and 19.0% who were 65 years of age or older. The median age was 43.9 years. For every 100 females age 18 and over, there were 96.2 males.

== Education ==
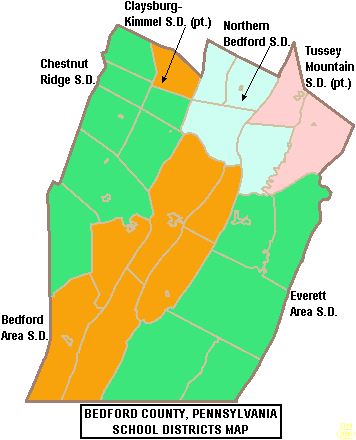
Map of Bedford County, Pennsylvania School Districts

=== Public school districts ===
- Bedford Area School District
- Chestnut Ridge School District
- Claysburg-Kimmel School District (also in Blair County)
- Everett Area School District
- Northern Bedford County School District
- Tussey Mountain School District (also in Huntingdon County)

=== Public charter schools ===
- HOPE for Hyndman Charter School, Hyndman

Pennsylvania resident students may also attend any of the Commonwealth's 13 public cyber charter schools which provide instruction via computers and the Internet.

=== Public vo-tech school ===
Bedford County Technical Center

=== Private schools ===
- Allegheny Valley Christian School, Schellsburg
- Christian Light School, Bedford
- Dry Hill Parochial School, Woodbury
- Foundations Christian Academy, Everett
- Friends Cove Mennonite School, Bedford
- Global Power Line Academy, Claysburg
- Golden Rule School, Martinsburg
- Learning Lamp at Everett, Everett
- Little Learning Lamp
- Lone Oak Mennonite School, New Enterprise
- Noahs Ark Kindergarten, New Park
- South Cove Parochial School, New Enterprise
- Saint Thomas School, Bedford, Pennsylvania, Bedford
- Sunny Slope School, Woodbury
- Woodbury Mennonite School, Woodbury

=== Colleges or university ===
- Allegany College of Maryland campus in Everett

As reported in ED Names and Places directory maintained by the Pennsylvania Department of Education August 2015

== Transportation ==
=== Major highways ===
- I-70 / I-76 / Penna Turnpike
- I-99
- US 30
- US 30 Bus.
- US 220
- US 220 Bus.
- PA 26
- PA 31
- PA 36
- PA 56
- PA 96
- PA 164
- PA 326
- PA 866
- PA 867
- PA 868
- PA 869
- PA 913
- PA 915

=== Airports ===
Bedford County Airport is a public use airport in Bedford County. It is owned by the Bedford County Airport Authority and is located four nautical miles (7.4 km) north of the central business district of the borough of Bedford, Pennsylvania.

== Recreation ==
There are three Pennsylvania state parks in Bedford County:

- Blue Knob State Park, site of the Blue Knob All Seasons Resort
- Shawnee State Park
- Warriors Path State Park

The largest borough-owned park in the county is a 77-acre community park in Everett, open to the public and available for events. Mid State Trail and Great Eastern Trail pass through Everett and Tenley Park.

- Tenley Park

== Communities ==
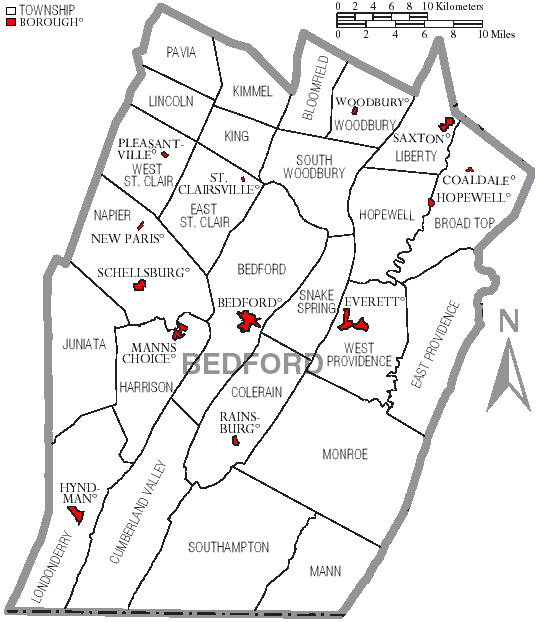
Map of Bedford County, Pennsylvania, with Municipal Labels showing Boroughs (red) and Townships (white)

Under Pennsylvania law, there are four types of incorporated municipalities: cities, boroughs, townships, and, in only one case (Bloomsburg, Columbia County), towns. The following boroughs and townships are located in Bedford County:

=== Boroughs ===
- Bedford (county seat)
- Coaldale
- Everett
- Hopewell
- Hyndman
- Manns Choice
- New Paris
- Pleasantville
- Rainsburg
- St. Clairsville
- Saxton
- Schellsburg
- Woodbury

=== Townships ===
- Bedford
- Bloomfield
- Broad Top
- Colerain
- Cumberland Valley
- East Providence
- East St. Clair
- Harrison
- Hopewell
- Juniata
- Kimmel
- King
- Liberty
- Lincoln
- Londonderry
- Mann
- Monroe
- Napier
- Pavia
- Snake Spring
- South Woodbury
- Southampton
- West Providence
- West St. Clair
- Woodbury

=== Census-designated places ===
- Defiance
- Earlston
- Stonerstown

=== Other communities ===
- Alumbank

=== Population ranking ===
The population ranking of the following table is based on the 2010 census of Bedford County.

† county seat

Rank	City/Town/etc.	Population (2010 Census)	Municipal type	Incorporated
1	† Bedford	2,841	Borough	1795
2	Everett	1,834	Borough	1860
3	Earlston	1,122	CDP	
4	Hyndman	910	Borough	1877
5	Saxton	736	Borough	1867
6	Stonerstown	376	CDP	
7	Schellsburg	338	Borough	1838
8	Manns Choice	300	Borough	1886
9	Woodbury	284	Borough	1868
10	Defiance	239	CDP	
11	Hopewell	230	Borough	1895
12	Pleasantville	198	Borough	1871
13	New Paris	186	Borough	1882
14	Coaldale	161	Borough	1865
15	Rainsburg	133	Borough	1856
16	St. Clairsville	78	Borough	1867

== See also ==
- National Register of Historic Places listings in Bedford County, Pennsylvania
