= Schellsburg, Pennsylvania =

Borough in Pennsylvania, US

- Borough
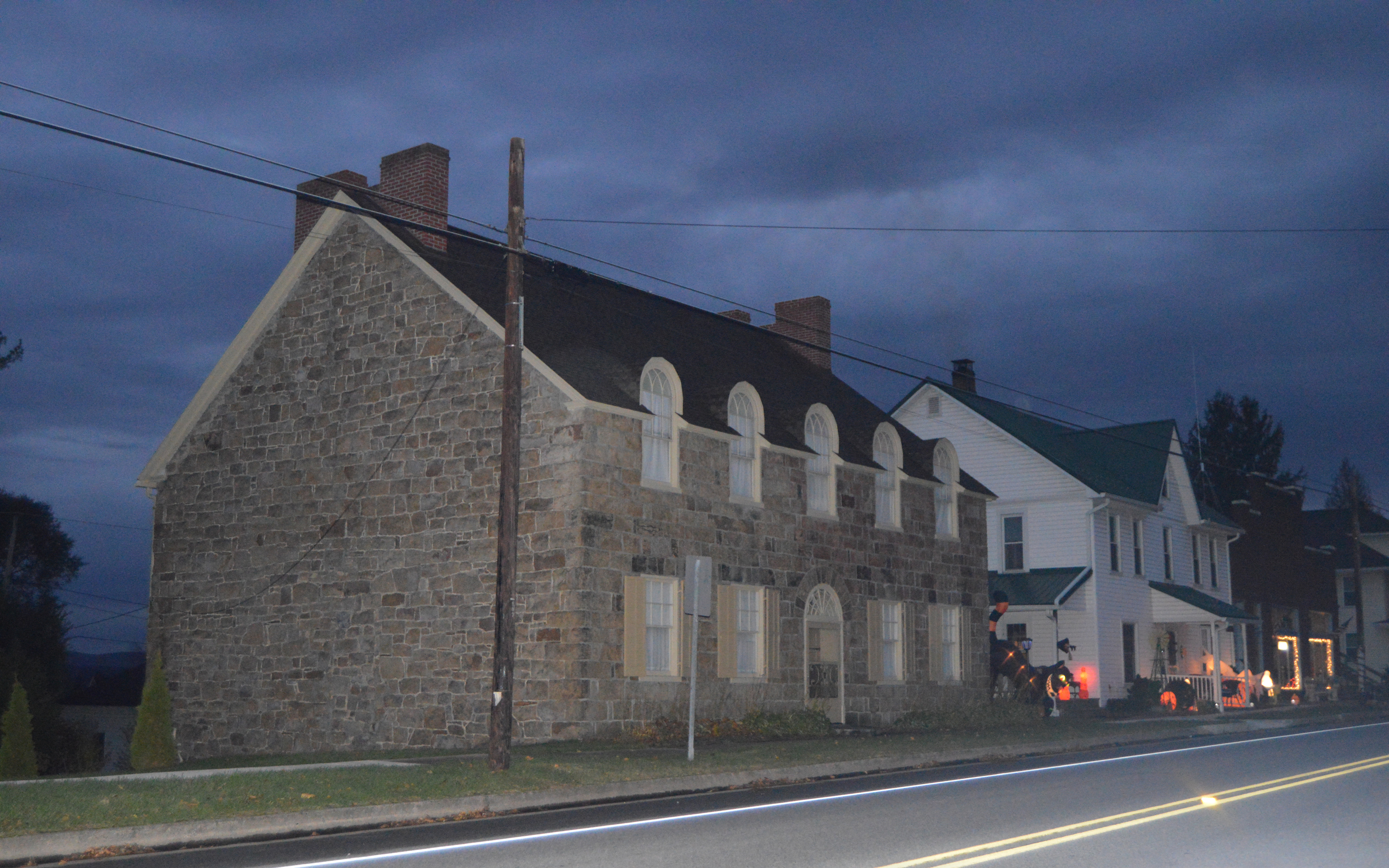
- Pitt Street on the borough's east side

- Location of Schellsburg in Bedford County, Pennsylvania.

- Location within Pennsylvania
- Coordinates: 40°02′55″N 78°38′38″W
- Country: United States
- State: Pennsylvania
- County: Bedford
- Settled: 1808
- Incorporated: 1838

Government
  - Type: Borough Council

Area
  - Total: 0.25 sq mi (0.66 km^{2})
  - Land: 0.25 sq mi (0.66 km^{2})
  - Water: 0 sq mi (0.00 km^{2})
- Elevation: 1,168 ft (356 m)

Population (2020)
  - Total: 330
  - Estimate (2021): 327
  - Density: 1,253.2/sq mi (483.88/km^{2})
- Time zone: UTC−5 (Eastern (EST))
  - Summer (DST): UTC−4 (EDT)
- ZIP Code: 15559
- Area code: 814
- FIPS code: 42-68152

Schellsburg is a borough in Bedford County, Pennsylvania, United States. The population was 330 at the 2020 census.

== History ==
Schellsburg was so named after John Schell who settled and founded the community. John Schell's grandfather Michael Schell first arrived in Philadelphia from the Palatinate by way of Rotterdam in 1727, after which more family members arrived in 1732 and again in 1738. In 1732 when he returned with other members of his family, Michael Schell purchased a substantial tract of land where he settled with his family in the Perkiomen Valley northwest of Philadelphia, an area in Upper Hanover Township later known as East Greenville, in what was then Philadelphia County and became Montgomery County in 1760. The adjoining community of Hillegassville was named after its founder Johann Frederick Hillegass. His granddaughter Elizabeth Barbara Hillegass married John Schell Jr., who was born in 1725 at the family homestead granted to his father John Schell Sr., the youngest son of Michael Schell who died in 1770.

At an early age, John Schell Jr. became possessed of considerable means after his patriotic service in the Revolutionary War and his father's death in 1777. For many years he traveled extensively on business through Bedford County, western Pennsylvania and Kentucky, which was admitted as a state in 1792. He was impressed by the climate and fertile soil in Kentucky, decided to remove there and select land to establish his own community for his family and friends. In the spring of 1800, John Schell and his family, consisting of his wife, eight young children and his widowed mother, left their home in Montgomery County and traveled west. When they arrived at the Ohio River, he realized that it would be unsafe for his family to traverse the river by boat due to the Indians. He returned through Napier Township in Bedford County and decided instead to settle in what is the present location of Schellsburg.

On May 1, 1800, John Schell purchased large tracts of land of more than 1,500 acres (6.1 km^{2}), which were later divided into farms and given to each of his sons with an equivalent in money and land to his daughters. His own homestead was constructed on property located outside the town of Schellsburg. John Schell generously donated land for schools, churches and town lots and granted parcels to the town and its citizens. In 1808 he laid out the town lots, developed the community and provided impetus for construction of the nearby turnpike as its first president. After he settled in Bedford County, relatives and neighbors in Montgomery County followed and settled in the area and the immediate vicinity. Schellsburg was incorporated as the second borough of Bedford County in 1838. The town was designated as the Schellsburg Historic District in 2001 and included on the National Register of Historic Places in recognition of the town's rich architectural heritage of buildings constructed of log and stone in the 19th century.

The first church in Schellsburg was Union Church. It was erected in 1806 and is the oldest church structure in Bedford County. John Schell died in 1825, his wife in 1842, and they are buried next to each other in the cemetery which encircles the church, surrounded by generations of family members who followed them. Now known as the Old Log Church, it was included on the National Register of Historic Places in 2005 as the Chestnut Ridge and Schellsburg Union Church and Cemetery. It was rededicated during the Bicentennial celebration on June 24, 2006. During the celebration, a Founder's Stone was dedicated and placed at the grave of John Schell, which is further distinguished by a Daughters of the American Revolution (DAR) marker and flag to commemorate his service in the Revolutionary War.

In 1889, citrus magnate John A. Snively was born in Schellsburg.

On November 22, 1964, Schellsburg made national news with "the first... four-way merger in the history of religion in the United States" when the United Church of Schellsburg held services for a congregation made up of the town's Presbyterian, Lutheran, Methodist and United Church of Christ members.

== Geography ==
Schellsburg is located in western Bedford County at 40°2′55″N 78°38′38″W (40.048680, -78.643944). It lies at the southern end of Allegheny Front and is bordered to the south by Shawnee State Park.

U.S. Route 30, the Lincoln Highway, passes through the borough, leading east 9 miles (14 km) to Bedford, the county seat, and west 86 miles (138 km) to Pittsburgh. Pennsylvania Route 96 crosses Route 30 in the center of town, leading north to New Paris and Pleasantville and south through Shawnee State Park to Manns Choice.

According to the United States Census Bureau, Schellsburg has a total area of 0.25 square miles (0.66 km^{2}), all land.

=== Geology ===
Schellsburg lies on the southeast flank of Allegheny Mountain, which is a doubly plunging anticline of the Devonian Onondaga Formation and Old Port Formation. The contact of the Onondaga formation with the overlying Marcellus Shale of the Hamilton Group passes through the town. All the rocks dip gently to the southeast.

== Demographics ==
Historical population
Census	Pop.	Note	%±
1850	360		—
1860	394		9.4%
1870	342		−13.2%
1880	359		5.0%
1890	281		−21.7%
1900	312		11.0%
1910	314		0.6%
1920	290		−7.6%
1930	300		3.4%
1940	328		9.3%
1950	305		−7.0%
1960	288		−5.6%
1970	271		−5.9%
1980	325		19.9%
1990	245		−24.6%
2000	316		29.0%
2010	338		7.0%
2020	330		−2.4%
2021 (est.)	327	▼	−0.9%

As of the census of 2000, there were 316 people, 129 households, and 91 families residing in the borough. The population density was 793.6 inhabitants per square mile (306.4/km^{2}). There were 148 housing units at an average density of 371.7 per square mile (143.5/km^{2}). The racial makeup of the borough was 98.42% White, 0.32% Native American, and 1.27% from two or more races. 0.32% of the population were Hispanic or Latino of any race.

There were 129 households, out of which 27.1% had children under the age of 18 living with them, 65.1% were married couples living together, 3.9% had a female householder with no husband present, and 28.7% were non-families. Of all households 24.8% were made up of individuals, and 14.7% had someone living alone who was 65 years of age or older. The average household size was 2.45 and the average family size was 2.86.

In the borough the population was spread out, with 21.5% under the age of 18, 8.2% from 18 to 24, 28.5% from 25 to 44, 22.8% from 45 to 64, and 19.0% who were 65 years of age or older. The median age was 39 years. For every 100 females there were 88.1 males. For every 100 females age 18 and over, there were 87.9 males.

The median income for a household in the borough was $36,563, and the median income for a family was $38,750. Males had a median income of $27,386 versus $20,000 for females. The per capita income for the borough was $16,303. 5.8% of the population and 2.5% of families were below the poverty line. Out of the total population, none of those under the age of 18 and 13.1% of those 65 and older were living below the poverty line.

== See also ==
- Shawnee State Park (Pennsylvania)
