= Hyndman, Pennsylvania =

Borough in Pennsylvania, US

- Borough
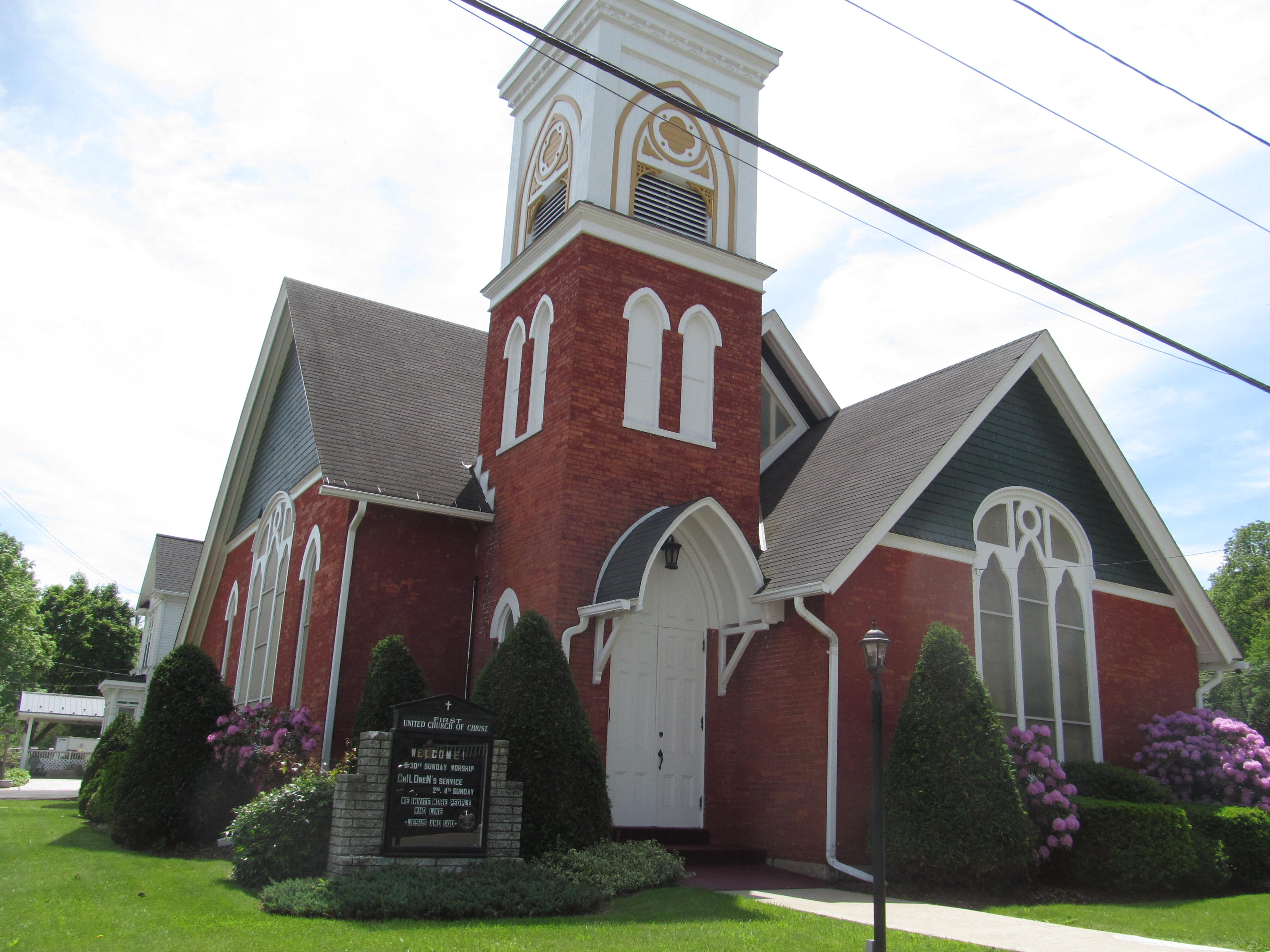
- First United Church of Christ in Hyndman

- Location of Hyndman in Bedford County, Pennsylvania
- Coordinates: 39°49′15″N 78°43′17″W
- Country: United States
- State: Pennsylvania
- County: Bedford
- Settled: 1800
- Incorporated: 1877

Government
  - Type: Borough Council
  - Mayor: Travis Leap

Area
  - Total: 0.53 sq mi (1.37 km^{2})
  - Land: 0.51 sq mi (1.32 km^{2})
  - Water: 0.015 sq mi (0.04 km^{2})
- Elevation: 948 ft (289 m)

Population (2020)
  - Total: 863
  - Density: 1,687/sq mi (651.4/km^{2})
- Time zone: UTC-5 (Eastern (EST))
  - Summer (DST): UTC-4 (EDT)
- Zip Code: 15545
- Area code: 814
- FIPS code: 42-36640
- GNIS feature ID: 1214899
- Website: https://www.hyndmanboro.com/

Hyndman is a borough in Bedford County, Pennsylvania, United States. As of the 2020 census, the population was 863. Hyndman is located in the southwest corner of the country, just north of the Mason-Dixon Line. The small town sits in the valley between Wills Mountain and Savage Mountain.

== History ==
The first known settler in the area was Samuel Waters, who lived near Wills Creek and built a bridge across it before 1800. Around 1800, Jacob Burkett and Amos Raley started a boatbuilding business at the settlement called Bridgeport. Boats were needed to float grain down to Cumberland, Maryland. In 1850, Enoch Cade opened a store, and in 1865 a one-room school was opened. Samuel Miller began laying out a town on his land north of the creek.

In 1871, the Baltimore and Ohio Railroad first came through the town, going from Cumberland to Pittsburgh, and the Bedford and Bridgeport Railroad was built from Mt. Dallas (near Everett) to Cumberland. In September 1877, the town was incorporated, and in December of that year the town was renamed Hyndman in honor of the B&O's Connellsville Division Railroad Superintendent E. K. Hyndman. The first elected officials were Chief Burgess S. M. Wilhelm and Council members J. W. Madore, W. S. Mullin, Samuel Miller, and Henry Miller. Early industries included the manufacturing of bricks and limestone.

In 1889, the National Bank of South Pennsylvania was opened in Hyndman, but failed in 1905. It was purchased by J. J. Hoblitzell, giving it the name it has today – Hoblitzell National Bank. In 1892 the Hyndman Water Company was completed, in 1893 the electric plant opened, the telephone exchange was begun in 1906, and in 1927 a fire company was organized.

A major fire in late December 1949 burned out Hyndman's business center – mostly of frame building construction – before it was brought under control. In August 2017, a 33-car train derailment sparked fires that resulted in evacuation of most of the town's residents for several days.

== Geography ==
Hyndman is located in southwestern Bedford County and is surrounded by Londonderry Township.

The borough sits in the valley of Wills Creek, which breaks through Savage Mountain and Little Allegheny Mountain to the west and turns south at Hyndman to flow towards Maryland. Little Wills Creek joins Wills Creek in the eastern part of the borough. Wills Mountain rises to the east.

Pennsylvania Route 96 passes through the borough as Center Street and Pennsylvania Avenue. It leads north 19 miles (31 km) to Schellsburg and south 7 miles (11 km) to the Maryland line, where it becomes Maryland Route 35 and continues 7 miles (11 km) farther to Cumberland.

According to the United States Census Bureau, Hyndman has a total area of 0.53 square miles (1.37 km^{2}), of which 0.02 square miles (0.04 km^{2}), or 3.11%, is water.

== Demographics ==
Historical population
Census	Pop.	Note	%±
1880	323		—
1890	1,056		226.9%
1900	1,242		17.6%
1910	1,164		−6.3%
1920	1,179		1.3%
1930	1,190		0.9%
1940	1,325		11.3%
1950	1,322		−0.2%
1960	1,124		−15.0%
1970	1,151		2.4%
1980	1,106		−3.9%
1990	1,019		−7.9%
2000	1,005		−1.4%
2010	910		−9.5%
2020	863		−5.2%
2021 (est.)	855	▼	−0.9%

As of the census of 2000, there were 1,005 people, 413 households, and 296 families residing in the borough. The population density was 1,849.6 inhabitants per square mile (714.1/km^{2}). There were 448 housing units at an average density of 824.5 per square mile (318.3/km^{2}). The racial makeup of the borough was 98.11% White, 0.60% Native American, 0.50% from other races, and 0.80% from two or more races. Hispanic or Latino of any race were 0.80% of the population.

There were 413 households, out of which 30.0% had children under the age of 18 living with them, 61.3% were married couples living together, 8.0% had a female householder with no husband present, and 28.3% were non-families. 26.2% of all households were made up of individuals, and 17.7% had someone living alone who was 65 years of age or older. The average household size was 2.43 and the average family size was 2.94.

In the borough the population was spread out, with 24.2% under the age of 18, 5.7% from 18 to 24, 25.9% from 25 to 44, 22.9% from 45 to 64, and 21.4% who were 65 years of age or older. The median age was 41 years. For every 100 females there were 90.3 males. For every 100 females age 18 and over, there were 82.3 males.

The median income for a household in the borough was $27,700, and the median income for a family was $34,792. Males had a median income of $28,917 versus $21,750 for females. The per capita income for the borough was $15,865. About 7.7% of families and 10.5% of the population were below the poverty line, including 14.8% of those under age 18 and 6.3% of those age 65 or over.
