= Pennsylvania State Game Lands Number 97 =

Park in the United States

- Location within Pennsylvania Location within the United States
- Location: Bedford County, Pennsylvania
- Nearest town: Everett; Rainsburg
- Coordinates: 39°56′11″N 78°26′48″W
- Area: 7,612 acres (3,080 ha)
- Elevation: 1,834 feet (559 m)
- Max. elevation: 2,352 feet (717 m)
- Min. elevation: 1,080 feet (330 m)
- Owner: Pennsylvania Game Commission
- Website: www.pgc.pa.gov/HuntTrap/StateGameLands/Documents/SGL%20Maps/SGL__97.pdf

The Pennsylvania State Game Lands Number 97 are Pennsylvania State Game Lands in Bedford County in Pennsylvania in the United States providing hunting, bird watching, and other activities.

== Geography ==
SGL 97 consists of one parcel located in Colerain, Monroe, Snake Spring, Southampton, and West Providence Townships in Bedford County. Nearby communities are the boroughs of Everett and Rainsburg and populated places Ashcom, Beegleton, Chaneysville, Charlesville, Clear Ridge, Clearville, Diehl, Earlston, Five Forks, Hartley, Koontzville, Lutzville, Mench, Mount Dallas, Ott Town, and Penn Wood. SGL 97 is northeast/southwest oriented along Tussey Mountain with some portions in the valleys on either side. Pennsylvania State Game Lands Number 73 is located to the northeast along the same ridge, Pennsylvania State Game Lands Number 49 is located to the east, Pennsylvania State Game Lands Number 48 is located to the west, portions of the Buchanan State Forest is located to the east, south, and west of SGL 97. The Game Lands is located in the Juniata River watershed, which is part of the Susquehanna River watershed.

== Statistics ==
SGL 97 was entered into the Geographic Names Information System on 2 August 1979 as identification number 1193463, its elevation is listed as 1,834 feet (559 m). Elevations range from 1,080 feet (330 m) to 2,352 feet (717 m). It consists of 7,612 acres (3,080 ha) in one parcel.

== Biology ==
Gamebird hunting is limited due to the local habitat, except that American woodcock (Scolopax minor) can be found in the valleys along stream beds and shrublands. Hunting and furtaking species include beaver (Castor canadensis), coyote (Canis latrans), gray fox (Urocyon cinereoargenteus), red fox (Vulpes Vulpes), and raccoon (Procyon lotor).

== See also ==
- Pennsylvania State Game Lands
- Pennsylvania State Game Lands Number 26, also located in Bedford County
- Pennsylvania State Game Lands Number 41, also located in Bedford County
- Pennsylvania State Game Lands Number 48, also located in Bedford County
- Pennsylvania State Game Lands Number 49, also located in Bedford County
- Pennsylvania State Game Lands Number 73, also located in Bedford County
- Pennsylvania State Game Lands Number 104, also located in Bedford County
- Pennsylvania State Game Lands Number 261, also located in Bedford County
