= Cumberland Township, Pennsylvania =

Cumberland Township is the name of some places in the U.S. state of Pennsylvania:

- Cumberland Township, Adams County, Pennsylvania
- Cumberland Township, Greene County, Pennsylvania

== See also ==
- Cumberland Valley Township, Pennsylvania
