= Pennsylvania State Game Lands Number 48 =

Park in the United States

- Location within Pennsylvania Location within the United States
- Location: Bedford County, Pennsylvania, US
- Nearest city: Johnstown
- Coordinates: 39°50′30″N 78°40′51″W
- Area: 11,093 acres (4,489 ha)
- Elevation: 1,893 feet (577 m)
- Max. elevation: 2,781 feet (848 m)
- Min. elevation: 1,000 feet (300 m)
- Owner: Pennsylvania Game Commission
- Website: Pennsylvania State Game Lands

The Pennsylvania State Game Lands Number 48 are Pennsylvania State Game Lands in Bedford County in Pennsylvania in the United States providing hunting, bird watching, and other activities.

== Geography ==
SGL 48 consists of two parcels located in Bedford, Cumberland Valley, Harrison, and Londonderry Townships in Bedford County near the boroughs of Manns Choice and the villages of Bedford, Bedford Springs, Burning Bush, Buffalo Mills, and Rockville. SGL 48 straddles Wills Mountain and into parts of the Cumberland Valley and the Milligan Cove. It also extends into a small area of the eastern slope of Buffalo Mountain. U.S. Route 220 parallels the eastern border of the Game Lands. Pennsylvania State Game Lands Number 104 is about 5 miles (8.0 km) to the west, Buchanan State Forest and Pennsylvania State Game Lands Number 97 are just a few miles to the east.

== Statistics ==
SGL 48 was entered into the Geographic Names Information System on 2 August 1979 as identification number 1193455, its elevation is listed as 1,893 feet (577 m). Elevations range from 960 feet (290 m) to 2,779 feet (847 m). It consists of 11,093 acres (4,489 ha) in two parcels.

== Biology ==
Hunting and furtaking species include bear (Ursus americanus), white-tailed deer (Odocoileus virginianus), gray fox (Urocyon cinereoargenteus), red fox (Vulpes Vulpes), pheasant (Phasianus colchicus), rabbit (Sylvilagus floridanus), Raccoon (Procyon lotor), (Sciurus carolinensis), and turkey (Meleagris gallopavo), and Woodcock (Scolopax minor).

== See also ==
- Pennsylvania State Game Lands
- Pennsylvania State Game Lands Number 26, also located in Bedford County
- Pennsylvania State Game Lands Number 41, also located in Bedford County
- Pennsylvania State Game Lands Number 49, also located in Bedford County
- Pennsylvania State Game Lands Number 73, also located in Bedford County
- Pennsylvania State Game Lands Number 97, also located in Bedford County
- Pennsylvania State Game Lands Number 104, also located in Bedford County
- Pennsylvania State Game Lands Number 261, also located in Bedford County
