= Pennsylvania State Game Lands Number 73 =

Park in the United States

- Location within Pennsylvania Location within the United States
- Location: Bedford, Blair and Huntingdon Counties, Pennsylvania
- Nearest city: Altoona
- Coordinates: 40°7′14″N 78°22′5″W
- Area: 20,814 acres (8,423 ha)
- Elevation: 1,919 feet (585 m)
- Max. elevation: 2,550 feet (780 m)
- Min. elevation: 900 feet (270 m)
- Owner: Pennsylvania Game Commission

The Pennsylvania State Game Lands Number 73 are Pennsylvania State Game Lands in Bedford, Blair and Huntingdon Counties in Pennsylvania in the United States providing hunting, bird watching, and other activities.

== Geography ==
SGL 73 consists of six parcels located in Hopewell, Liberty, Snake Spring, South Woodbury, West Providence, and Woodbury Townships in Bedford County, Huston, North Woodbury, and Woodbury Townships in Blair County, and Hopewell and Lincoln Townships in Huntingdon County. Nearby communities are the boroughs of Everett, Hopewell, Marklesburg, Saxton, Woodbury, and populated places Curryville, Loysburg, Mount Dallas, Puttstown, Riddlesburg, and Stonerstown. The Game Lands are along the slopes of Tussey Mountain. Pennsylvania State Game Lands Number 118 lies to the northeast and SGL 97 lies to the southwest, SGL 147 lies a few miles to the west, and SGL 67 is to the east. The Game Lands is located within the Little Juniata River watershed, which is part of the Susquehanna River watershed. Pennsylvania Route 26 runs northeast–southwest oriented running parallel to the Game Lands.

== Statistics ==
SGL 73 was entered into the Geographic Names Information System on 2 August 1979 as identification number 1188530, its elevation is listed as 1,919 feet (585 m). Elevations range from 900 feet (270 m) to 2,550 feet (780 m). It consists of 20,814 acres (8,423 ha) in six parcels.

== Biology ==
Hunting and furtaking species include bear (Ursus americanus), Bobcat (Lynx rufus), coyote (Canis latrans), white-tailed deer (Odocoileus virginianus), Fisher (Pekania pennanti), gray fox (Urocyon cinereoargenteus), red fox (Vulpes Vulpes), ruffed grouse (Bonasa umbellus), Raccoon (Procyon lotor), gray squirrel (Sciurus carolinensis), and turkey (Meleagris gallopavo).

== See also ==
- Pennsylvania State Game Lands
- Pennsylvania State Game Lands Number 26, also located in Bedford, Blair, Huntingdon Counties
- Pennsylvania State Game Lands Number 41, also located in Bedford County
- Pennsylvania State Game Lands Number 48, also located in Bedford County
- Pennsylvania State Game Lands Number 49, also located in Bedford County
- Pennsylvania State Game Lands Number 60, also located in Blair County
- Pennsylvania State Game Lands Number 97, also located in Bedford County
- Pennsylvania State Game Lands Number 104, also located in Bedford County
- Pennsylvania State Game Lands Number 108, also located in Blair County
- Pennsylvania State Game Lands Number 118, also located in Blair County
- Pennsylvania State Game Lands Number 147, also located in Blair County
- Pennsylvania State Game Lands Number 158, also located in Blair County
- Pennsylvania State Game Lands Number 166, also located in Blair and Huntingdon Counties
- Pennsylvania State Game Lands Number 261, also located in Bedford County
