= Bedford, Pennsylvania (disambiguation) =

Bedford, Pennsylvania could refer to:

- the borough of Bedford, Pennsylvania
- Bedford County, Pennsylvania
- Bedford Township, Pennsylvania
