= Colerain Township, Pennsylvania =

Colerain Township is the name of some places in the U.S. state of Pennsylvania:

- Colerain Township, Bedford County, Pennsylvania
- Colerain Township, Lancaster County, Pennsylvania
