= Monroe Township, Pennsylvania =

Monroe Township is the name of some places in the U.S. state of Pennsylvania:

- Monroe Township, Bedford County, Pennsylvania
- Monroe Township, Bradford County, Pennsylvania
- Monroe Township, Clarion County, Pennsylvania
- Monroe Township, Cumberland County, Pennsylvania
- Monroe Township, Juniata County, Pennsylvania
- Monroe Township, Snyder County, Pennsylvania
- Monroe Township, Wyoming County, Pennsylvania

== See also ==
- Monroe, Pennsylvania (disambiguation)
