= Pennsylvania State Game Lands Number 26 =

Park in the United States

- Location within Pennsylvania Location within the United States
- Location: Bedford, Blair, Cambria, Somerset Counties, Pennsylvania
- Nearest city: Altoona, Johnstown
- Coordinates: 40°16′6″N 78°37′23″W
- Area: 12,346 acres (4,996 ha)
- Elevation: 2,628 feet (801 m)
- Owner: Pennsylvania Game Commission

The Pennsylvania State Game Lands Number 26 are Pennsylvania State Game Lands in Bedford, Blair, Cambria, and Somerset Counties in Pennsylvania in the United States providing hunting, bird watching, equestrian, snowmobiling, and other activities.

== Geography ==
SGL 26 consists of two parcels located at:

- 40°16′6″N 78°37′23″W
- 40°17′13″N 78°37′27″W

SGL 26 is located in Lincoln and Pavia Townships in Bedford County, Greenfield Township in Blair County, Adams, Portage, and Summerhill Townships in Cambria County, and Ogle Township in Somerset County. The Game Lands include an elevation labeled in The National Map as Round Top (elevation 2,786 feet (849 m)). Nearby recreational and protected areas include Crichton McCormick Park in Portage to the north, Pennsylvania State Game Lands Number 198 to the northeast, Blue Knob State Park to the east, Gallitzin State Forest (Babcock Division) to the south, and the Johnstown Flood National Memorial to the northwest. Pennsylvania Route 869 passes through the larger parcel and touches the eastern border of the small parcel. The city of Altoona is about 20 miles (32 km) to the northeast, the city of Johnstown is about 16 miles (26 km) to the west. Nearby communities are Beaverdale, Claysburg, Paint, Pleasantville, Roaring Spring, and Windber. A portion of the Game Lands falls within the watershed of South Fork Little Conemaugh River and its tributaries which leads to the Conemaugh River, then to the Allegheny River, which is part of the Ohio River watershed. Other areas within the game lands are drained by Bob's Creek and are part of the Susquehanna watershed. Part of Buffalo road in the game lands runs along the continental divide with minor tributaries of both watersheds visible within feet of each other. The Flight 93 National Memorial lies about 20 miles (32 km) to the southwest.

== Statistics ==
SGL 189 was entered into the Geographic Names Information System on 2 August 1979 as identification number 1188508, its elevation is listed as 2,628 feet (801 m). Elevations range from 1,460 feet (450 m) along part of route 869 to 2,871 feet (875 m). It consists of 1,234 acres (499 ha) in two parcels.

== Biology ==
Hunting and furtaking species include bear (Ursus americanus), coyote (Canis latrans), white-tailed deer (Odocoileus virginianus), Fisher (Pekania pennanti), ruffed grouse (Bonasa umbellus), Raccoon (Procyon lotor), gray squirrel, (Sciurus carolinensis), and turkey (Meleagris gallopavo). Birdwatching species of interest include Acadian flycatcher (Empidonax cirescens), Scarlet tanager (Piranga olivacea), Wood thrush (Hylocichla mustelina), Blue-headed vireo (Vireo solitaries), Black-throated green warbler (Setophaga virens), and Louisiana waterthrush (Parkesia motacilla).

== See also ==
- Pennsylvania State Game Lands
- Pennsylvania State Game Lands Number 41, also located in Bedford County
- Pennsylvania State Game Lands Number 48, also located in Bedford County
- Pennsylvania State Game Lands Number 49, also located in Bedford County
- Pennsylvania State Game Lands Number 60, also located in Blair County
- Pennsylvania State Game Lands Number 73, also located in Bedford County
- Pennsylvania State Game Lands Number 97, also located in Bedford County
- Pennsylvania State Game Lands Number 104, also located in Bedford County
- Pennsylvania State Game Lands Number 108, also located in Blair County
- Pennsylvania State Game Lands Number 147, also located in Blair County
- Pennsylvania State Game Lands Number 158, also located in Blair and Cambria Counties
- Pennsylvania State Game Lands Number 166, also located in Blair and Huntingdon Counties
- Pennsylvania State Game Lands Number 261, also located in Bedford County
