= Hewitt Covered Bridge =

- U.S. National Register of Historic Places
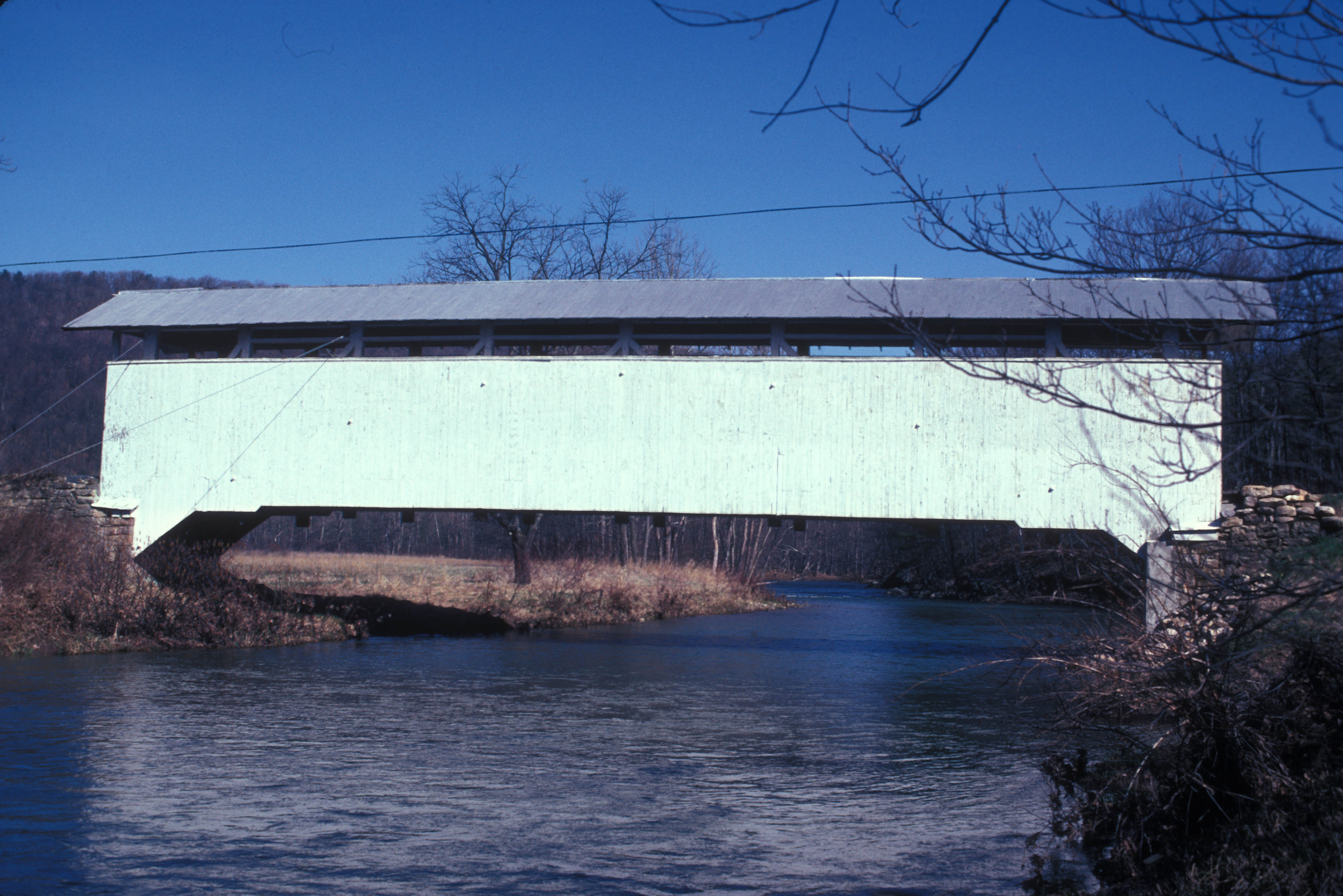

- Location within Pennsylvania Location within the United States
- Location: Township 305 at Hewitt, Southampton Township, Pennsylvania
- Coordinates: 39°45′16″N 78°30′40″W
- Area: less than one acre
- MPS: Bedford County Covered Bridges TR
- NRHP reference No.: 80003417
- Added to NRHP: April 10, 1980

The Hewitt Covered Bridge is a historic wooden covered bridge located at Southampton Township in Bedford County, Pennsylvania. It is an 88-foot-long (27 m), low to medium Burr Truss bridge with a medium gable roof. It crosses Town Creek. It is one of 15 historic covered bridges in Bedford County.

It was listed on the National Register of Historic Places in 1980.
