= Pennsylvania State Game Lands Number 261 =

Park in the United States

- Location within Pennsylvania Location within the United States
- Location: Bedford County
- Nearest town: Hopewell
- Coordinates: 40°7′0″N 78°16′0″W
- Area: 3,220 acres (1,300 ha)
- Elevation: 1,427 feet (435 m)
- Max. elevation: 1,943 feet (592 m)
- Min. elevation: 920 feet (280 m)
- Owner: Pennsylvania Game Commission
- Website: www.pgc.pa.gov/HuntTrap/StateGameLands/Documents/SGL%20Maps/SGL__261.pdf

The Pennsylvania State Game Lands Number 261 are Pennsylvania State Game Lands in Bedford County in Pennsylvania in the United States providing hunting, bird watching, and other activities.

== Geography ==
SGL 104 consists of a single parcel located in Broad Top Township. The northwest boundary parallels the Raystown Branch Juniata River, part of the Susquehanna River watershed. the southeastern boundary lies upon Kimber Mountain. Nearby communities include the Borough of Hopewell and populated places Cypher, Eichelbergertown, Jerkwater, Kearney, Langdondale, Marble City, Sandy Run, Stone Row, and Sunny Side. Pennsylvania State Game Lands Number 73 is a few miles to the west and Buchanan State Forest is to the east. Pennsylvania Route 26 runs a few miles north.

== Statistics ==
SGL 104 was entered into the Geographic Names Information System on 1 April 1990 as identification number 1208334, its elevation is listed as 1,427 feet (435 m). Elevations range from 920 feet (280 m) to 1,943 feet (592 m). It consists of 3,220 acres (1,300 ha) in one parcel.

== Biology ==
Hunting and furtaking species include bear (Ursus americanus), Coyote (Canis latrans), deer (Odocoileus virginianus), ducks, Gray fox (Urocyon cinereoargenteus), Red fox (Vulpes vulpes), Canada goose (Branta canadensis), grouse (Bonasa umbellus), Raccoon (Procyoon lotor), squirrel (Sciurus carolinensis), turkey (Meleagris gallopavo).

== See also ==
- Pennsylvania State Game Lands
- Pennsylvania State Game Lands Number 26, also located in Bedford County
- Pennsylvania State Game Lands Number 41, also located in Bedford County
- Pennsylvania State Game Lands Number 48, also located in Bedford County
- Pennsylvania State Game Lands Number 49, also located in Bedford County
- Pennsylvania State Game Lands Number 73, also located in Bedford County
- Pennsylvania State Game Lands Number 97, also located in Bedford County
- Pennsylvania State Game Lands Number 104, also located in Bedford County
