= Mann Township, Pennsylvania =

Township in Pennsylvania, US

Coordinates: 39°47′30″N 78°23′29″W

- Township
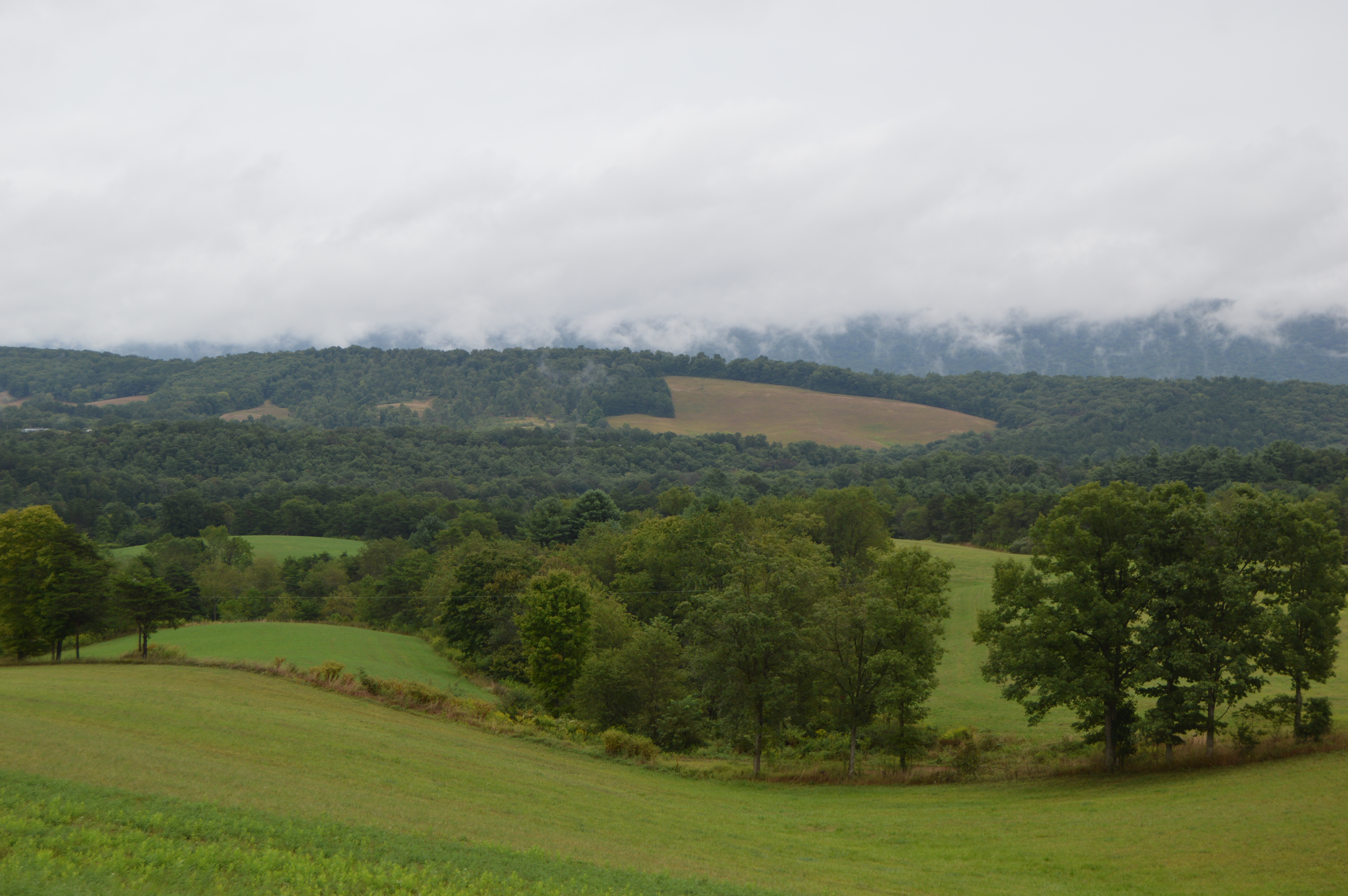
- Cloud-covered Addison Ridge and the Piney Creek valley

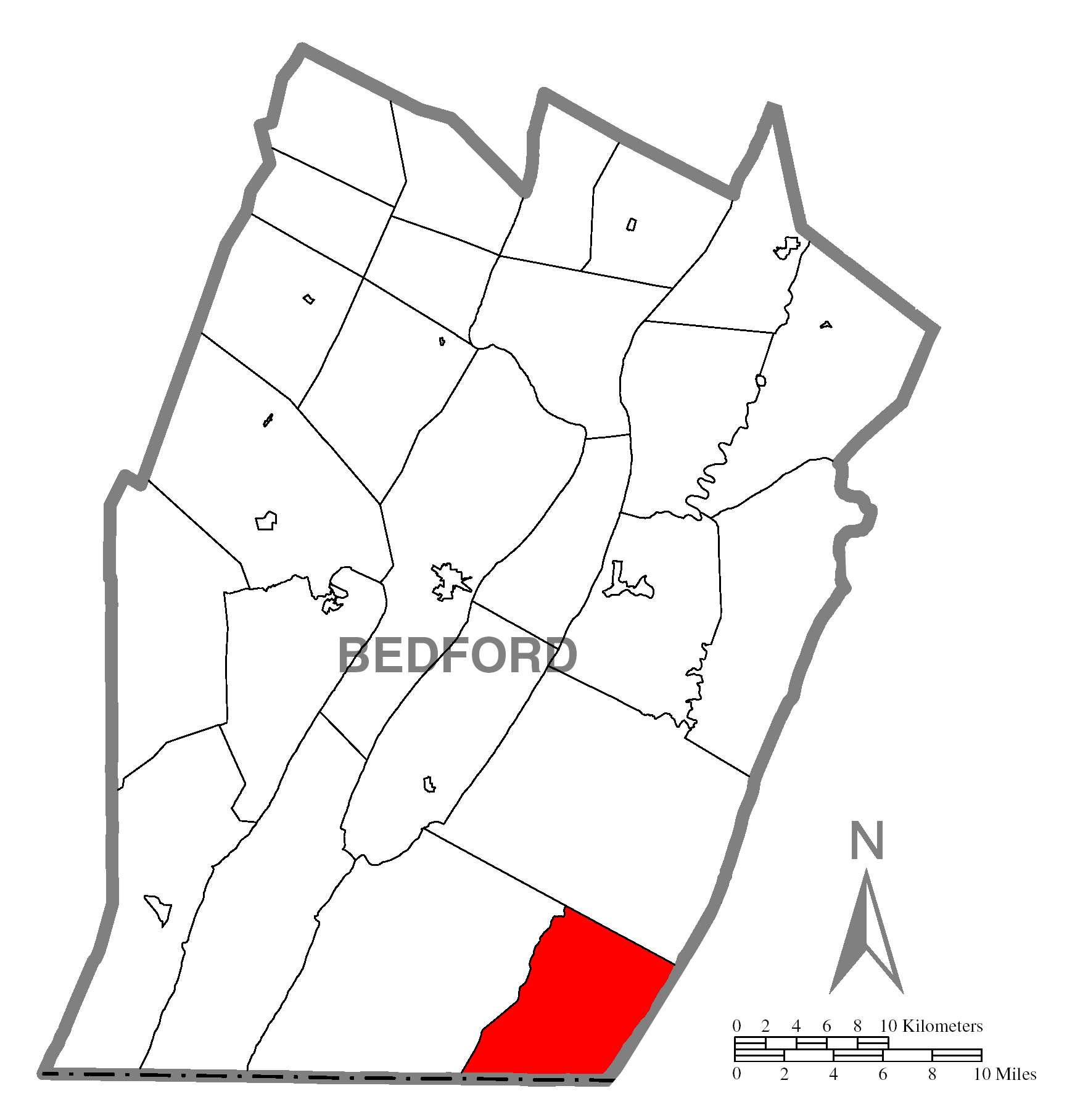
- Map of Bedford County, Pennsylvania highlighting Mann Township

- Map of Bedford County, Pennsylvania
- Country: United States
- State: Pennsylvania
- County: Bedford
- Settled: 1808
- Incorporated: 1876

Area
  - Total: 35.70 sq mi (92.47 km^{2})
  - Land: 35.68 sq mi (92.42 km^{2})
  - Water: 0.019 sq mi (0.05 km^{2})

Population (2020)
  - Total: 504 ▲
  - Estimate (2023): 507
  - Density: 13.6/sq mi (5.24/km^{2})
- Time zone: UTC-5 (Eastern (EST))
  - Summer (DST): UTC-4 (EDT)
- Area code: 814
- FIPS code: 42-009-46928

Mann Township is a township that is located in Bedford County, Pennsylvania, United States. The population was 504 at the time of the 2020 census.

== Geography ==
Mann Township is located in the southeastern corner of Bedford County, with Fulton County to the east and Allegany County, Maryland, to the south. According to the United States Census Bureau, the township has a total area of 35.7 square miles (92.5 km^{2}), of which 0.019 square miles (0.05 km^{2}), or 0.06%, is water.

=== Adjacent municipalities ===
- Southampton Township (west)
- Monroe Township (north)
- Union Township, Fulton County (east)
- Allegany County, Maryland (south)

== Recreation ==
Portions of the Buchanan State Forest and portions of the Pennsylvania State Game Lands Number 49 are located in the township.

== Demographics ==
Historical population
Census	Pop.	Note	%±
2000	481		—
2010	500		4.0%
2020	504		0.8%
2023 (est.)	507		0.6%
U.S. Decennial Census

As of the 2000 census, there were 481 people, 191 households, and 141 families residing in the township.

The population density was 13.4 people per square mile (5.2 people/km^{2}). There were 385 housing units at an average density of 10.7 units per square mile (4.1 units/km^{2}).

The racial makeup of the township was 99.17% White, 0.21% African American, 0.21% Asian, and 0.42% from two or more races.

There were 191 households, out of which 29.3% had children under the age of eighteen living with them; 61.3% were married couples living together, 6.8% had a female householder with no husband present, and 25.7% were non-families. 22.5% of all households were made up of individuals, and 7.3% had someone living alone who was sixty-five years of age or older.

The average household size was 2.52 and the average family size was 2.94.

Within the township, the population was spread out, with 24.7% of residents who were under the age of eighteen, 4.8% who were aged eighteen to twenty-four, 27.9% who were aged twenty-five to forty-four, 29.9% who were aged forty-five to sixty-four, and 12.7% who were sixty-five years of age or older. The median age was forty years.

For every one hundred females, there were 103.0 males. For every one hundred females who were aged eighteen or older, there were 100.0 males.

The median income for a household in the township was $28,929, and the median income for a family was $33,077. Males had a median income of $26,339 compared with that of $17,813 for females.

The per capita income for the township was $13,893.

Approximately 12.8% of families and 14.9% of the population were living below the poverty line, including 16.3% of those who were under the age of eighteen and 15.5% of those who were aged sixty-five or older.
