= Burning Bush, Pennsylvania =

Unincorporated community in Pennsylvania, US

- Unincorporated community
- Location within the state of Pennsylvania Burning Bush (the United States)
- Coordinates: 39°56′17″N 78°34′49″W
- Country: United States
- State: Pennsylvania
- County: Bedford
- Township: Bedford
- Elevation: 1,319 ft (402 m)
- Time zone: UTC−5 (Eastern (EST))
  - Summer (DST): UTC−4 (EDT)
- GNIS feature ID: 1170729

Burning Bush is an unincorporated community in Bedford County, Pennsylvania, United States.
