= Pennsylvania State Game Lands Number 41 =

Park in the United States

- Location within Pennsylvania Location within the United States
- Location: Bedford, Blair, Cambria, Somerset Counties, Pennsylvania
- Nearest city: Altoona
- Coordinates: 40°14′49″N 78°23′45″W; 40°14′36″N 78°26′46″W
- Area: 2,618 acres (1,059 ha)
- Elevation: 1,529 feet (466 m)
- Max. elevation: 2,254 feet (687 m)
- Min. elevation: 1,340 feet (410 m)
- Owner: Pennsylvania Game Commission
- Website: www.pgc.pa.gov/HuntTrap/StateGameLands/Documents/SGL%20Maps/SGL__41.pdf

The Pennsylvania State Game Lands Number 41 are Pennsylvania State Game Lands in Bedford and Blair Counties in Pennsylvania in the United States providing hunting, bird watching, and other activities.

== Geography ==
State Game Lands Number 41 consists of two parcels located in Bloomfield and Woodbury Townships in Bedford County near the villages of Bakers Summit, Morrisons Cove, and New Enterprise. Three small parcels are located in Greenfield Township in Blair County. The western parcel is located on the eastern slope of Dunning Mountain, however, the slope averages 30% or more, making accessibility very difficult. The National Map by the United States Geological Survey indicates four additional small parcels labelled as belonging to SGL41, the Pennsylvania Game Commission map only indicates the two parcels discussed in this article.

SGL 41 is about 16 miles (26 km) southwest of the city of Altoona, other nearby boroughs are Martinsburg, Roaring Spring, and Woodbury. Pennsylvania Route 36 is east of the main parcel and is north and south oriented, Pennsylvania Route 868 passes between the parcels and is also north and south oriented. Pennsylvania State Game Lands Number 73 lies about 5 miles (8.0 km) to the east. Pennsylvania State Game Lands Number 26 and Blue Knob State Park lie about 10 miles (16 km) to the west.

== Statistics ==
SGL 41 was entered into the Geographic Names Information System on 2 August 1979 as identification number 1188514, its elevation is listed as 1,529 feet (466 m). The highest elevation given is 2,254 feet (687 m). It consists of 2,618 acres (1,059 ha) in two parcels.

== Biology ==
Hunting and furtaking species include coyote (Canis latrans), white-tailed deer (Odocoileus virginianus), ruffed grouse (Bonasa umbellus), Raccoon (Procyon lotor), gray squirrel, (Sciurus carolinensis), and turkey (Meleagris gallopavo).

== See also ==
- Pennsylvania State Game Lands
- Pennsylvania State Game Lands Number 26, also located in Bedford County
- Pennsylvania State Game Lands Number 48, also located in Bedford County
- Pennsylvania State Game Lands Number 49, also located in Bedford County
- Pennsylvania State Game Lands Number 73, also located in Bedford County
- Pennsylvania State Game Lands Number 97, also located in Bedford County
- Pennsylvania State Game Lands Number 104, also located in Bedford County
- Pennsylvania State Game Lands Number 261, also located in Bedford County
