= Colerain Township, Bedford County, Pennsylvania =

Township in Pennsylvania, US

Coordinates: 39°55′00″N 78°32′29″W

- Township
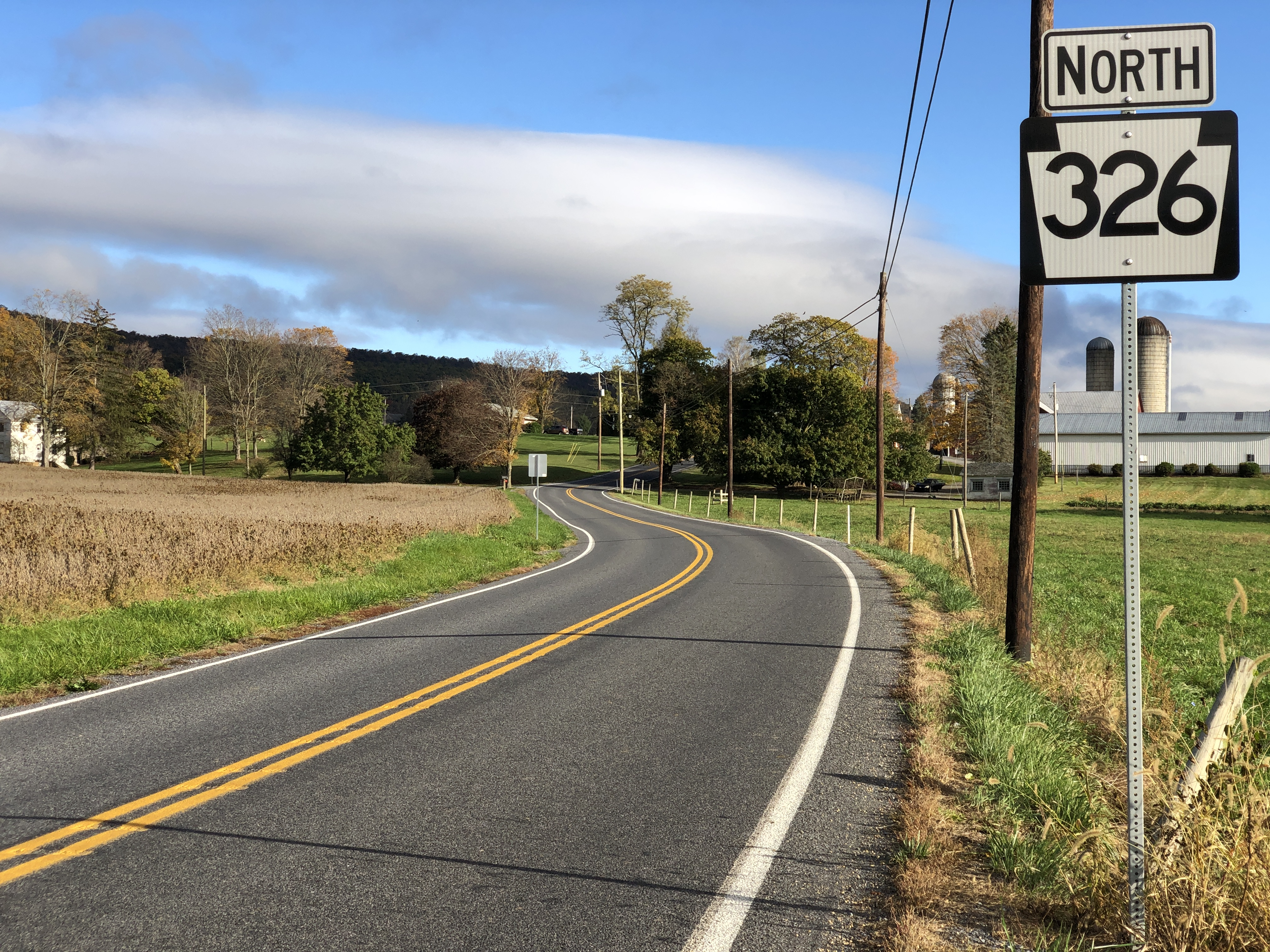
- Along PA 326 in Colerain Township

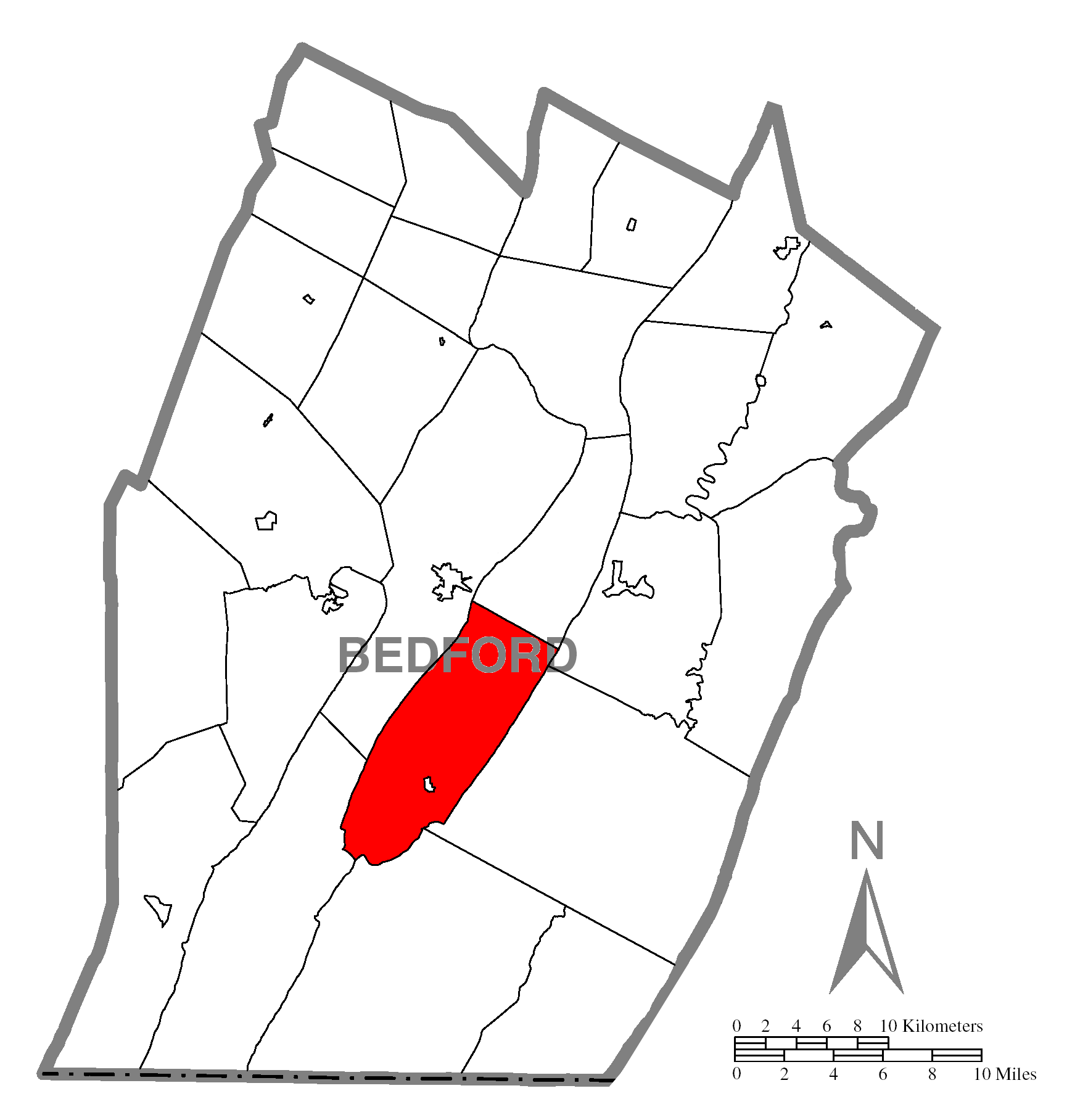
- Map of Bedford County, Pennsylvania highlighting Colerain Township

- Map of Bedford County, Pennsylvania
- Country: United States
- State: Pennsylvania
- County: Bedford
- Settled: 1765
- Incorporated: 1771

Area
  - Total: 42.00 sq mi (108.78 km^{2})
  - Land: 41.93 sq mi (108.59 km^{2})
  - Water: 0.073 sq mi (0.19 km^{2})

Population (2020)
  - Total: 1,132 ▼
  - Estimate (2023): 1,132
  - Density: 28.0/sq mi (10.81/km^{2})
- Time zone: UTC-5 (Eastern (EST))
  - Summer (DST): UTC-4 (EDT)
- Area code: 814
- FIPS code: 42-009-15032

Colerain Township is a township in Bedford County, Pennsylvania, United States. The population was 1,132 at the 2020 census.

== Geography ==
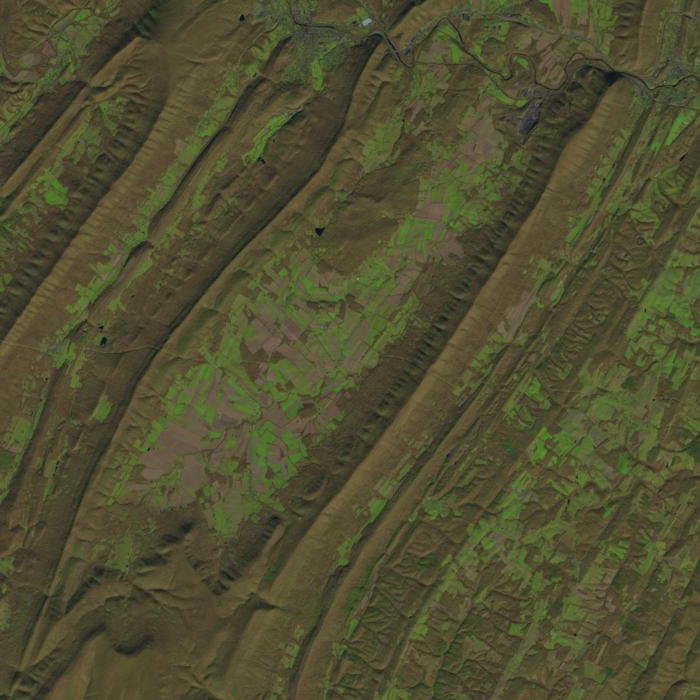
2016 Landsat image of Friends Cove

Colerain Township is located in central Bedford County in the Appalachian valley known as Friends Cove. The cove and the township are bordered on the east by Tussey Mountain and on the west by Evitts Mountain; the southern boundary follows the high ground where the two ridges merge. The northern boundary is the only border in the township that does not follow a ridgeline.

According to the United States Census Bureau, Colerain Township has a total area of 42.0 square miles (108.8 km^{2}), of which 41.9 square miles (108.6 km^{2}) is land and 0.077 square miles (0.2 km^{2}), or 0.17%, is water.

=== Adjacent municipalities ===
- Bedford Township (northwest)
- Snake Spring Township (north)
- West Providence Township (northeast)
- Monroe Township (east)
- Southampton Township (south)
- Cumberland Valley Township (southwest)
- Borough of Rainsburg (surrounded)

== Geology ==
Colerain valley (shown as "Friends Cove" on topographic maps) is an anticlinal valley, with Evitts Mountain and Tussey Mountain forming the limbs. The Silurian Tuscarora Formation, a hard sandstone, outcrops at the crests of the ridges and is stratigraphically higher and thus younger than the rest of the bedrock in the valley. The low knobs or "benches" on the northwest side of Tussey Mountain and the southeast side of Evitts Mountain are formed by the Ordovician Bald Eagle Formation, another sandstone, that is stratigraphically below the Tuscarora. The rock formations in the valley range from Ordovician shales and limestones to the Cambrian Warrior Formation, another sandstone. The limestones can form sinkholes.

== Recreation ==
Portions of the Pennsylvania State Game Lands Number 97 is located along the southeastern border of the township.

== Demographics ==
Historical population
Census	Pop.	Note	%±
2010	1,195		—
2020	1,132		−5.3%
2023 (est.)	1,132		0.0%
U.S. Decennial Census

As of the census of 2000, there were 1,147 people, 435 households, and 355 families residing in the township. The population density was 27.3 inhabitants per square mile (10.5/km^{2}). There were 483 housing units at an average density of 11.5/sq mi (4.4/km^{2}). The racial makeup of the township was 99.04% White, 0.26% African American, 0.17% Asian, and 0.52% from two or more races. Hispanic or Latino of any race were 0.44% of the population.

There were 435 households, out of which 31.5% had children under the age of 18 living with them, 70.3% were married couples living together, 5.5% had a female householder with no husband present, and 18.2% were non-families. 13.8% of all households were made up of individuals, and 8.0% had someone living alone who was 65 years of age or older. The average household size was 2.64 and the average family size was 2.87.

In the township the population was spread out, with 22.1% under the age of 18, 7.7% from 18 to 24, 26.8% from 25 to 44, 27.2% from 45 to 64, and 16.2% who were 65 years of age or older. The median age was 41 years. For every 100 females, there were 100.9 males. For every 100 females age 18 and over, there were 98.9 males.

The median income for a household in the township was $34,911, and the median income for a family was $40,875. Males had a median income of $27,596 versus $20,852 for females. The per capita income for the township was $18,149. About 7.3% of families and 11.0% of the population were below the poverty line, including 20.1% of those under age 18 and 8.4% of those age 65 or over.
