= Chaneysville, Pennsylvania =

Unincorporated community in Pennsylvania, US

- Unincorporated community
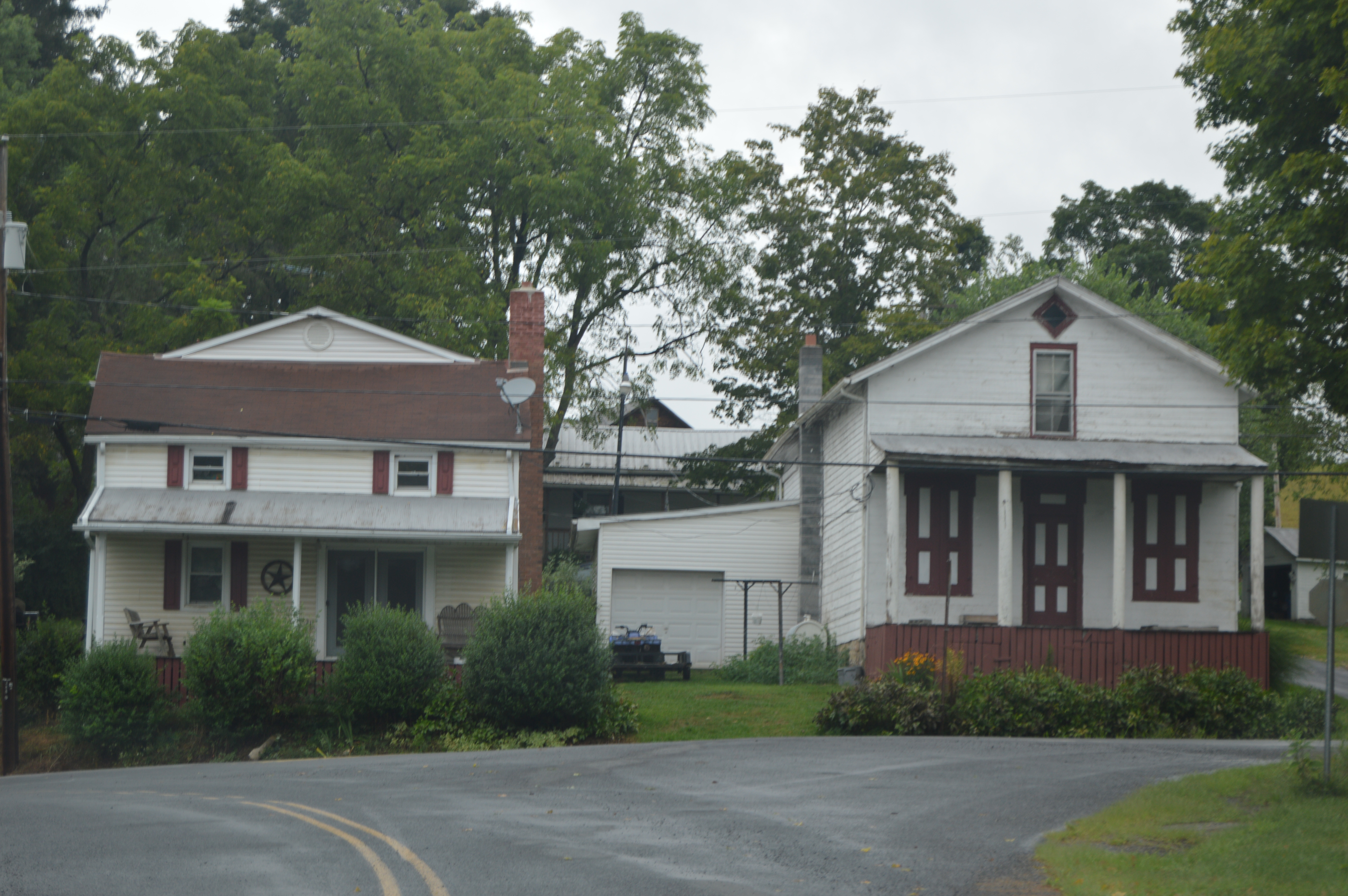
- Houses at the community's central intersection

- Location in Pennsylvania Chaneysville (the United States)
- Coordinates: 39°49′25″N 78°29′21″W
- Country: United States
- State: Pennsylvania
- County: Bedford
- Township: Southampton
- Elevation: 1,037 ft (316 m)
- Time zone: UTC-5 (Eastern (EST))
  - Summer (DST): UTC-4 (EDT)
- Area code: 814
- GNIS feature ID: 1171560
- Other names: Cheneysville

Chaneysville is an unincorporated community in Southampton Township, southern Bedford County, Pennsylvania, United States. It is named after Thomas Chaney Jr., who established the area's first home in the 1830s.

== History ==
Chaneysville was a self-sufficient village with local businesses, such as blacksmiths, a tannery, and grist mills. The village was also notable for its role as a stop on the Underground Railroad, assisting runaway enslaved people on their journey north. The village maintains a legacy of community spirit, reflected in its active churches and a volunteer fire company.
