= Woodbury Township, Bedford County, Pennsylvania =

Township in Pennsylvania, US

Coordinates: 40°13′00″N 78°22′35″W

- Township
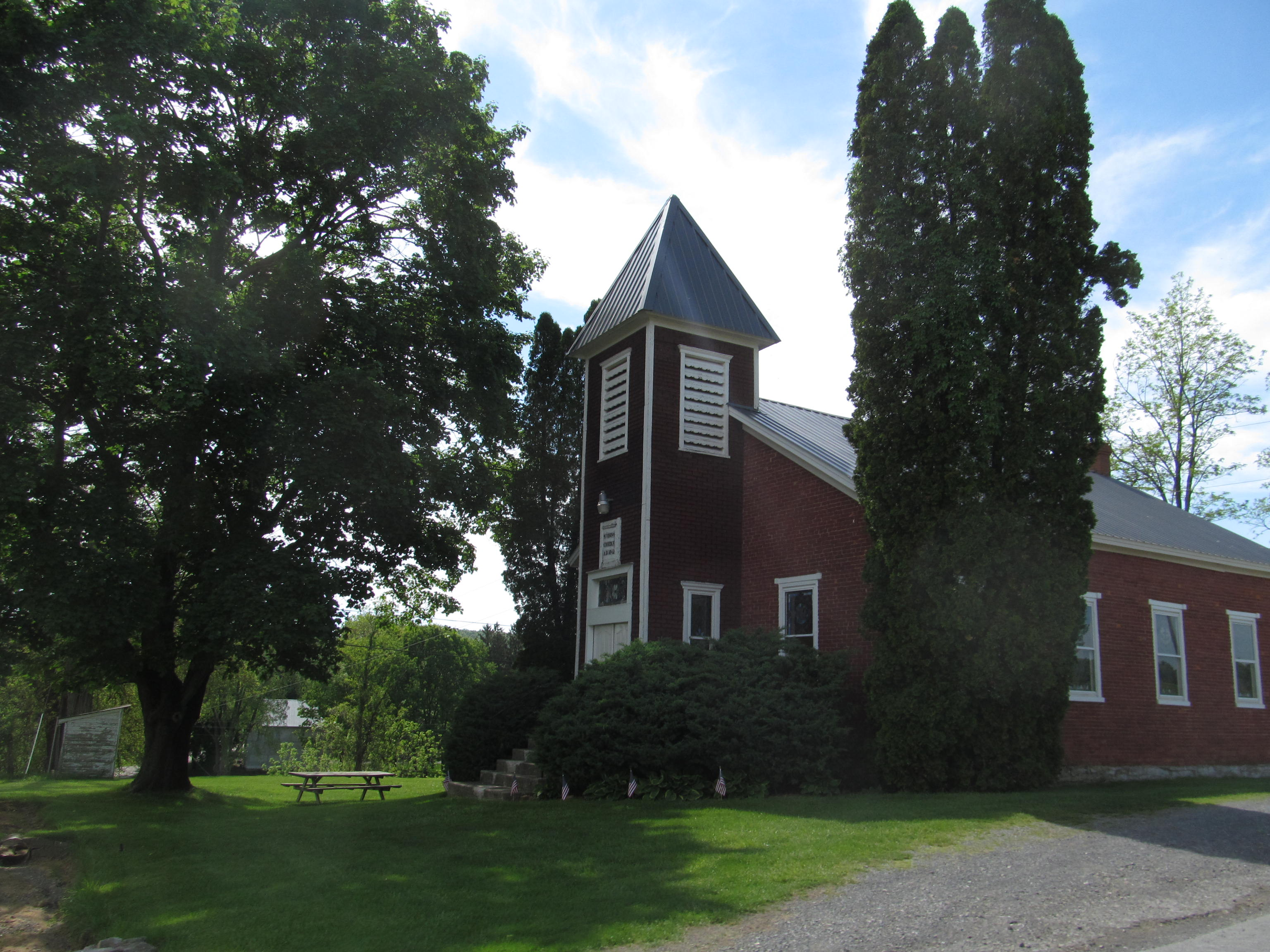
- St. John's Church along PA 868

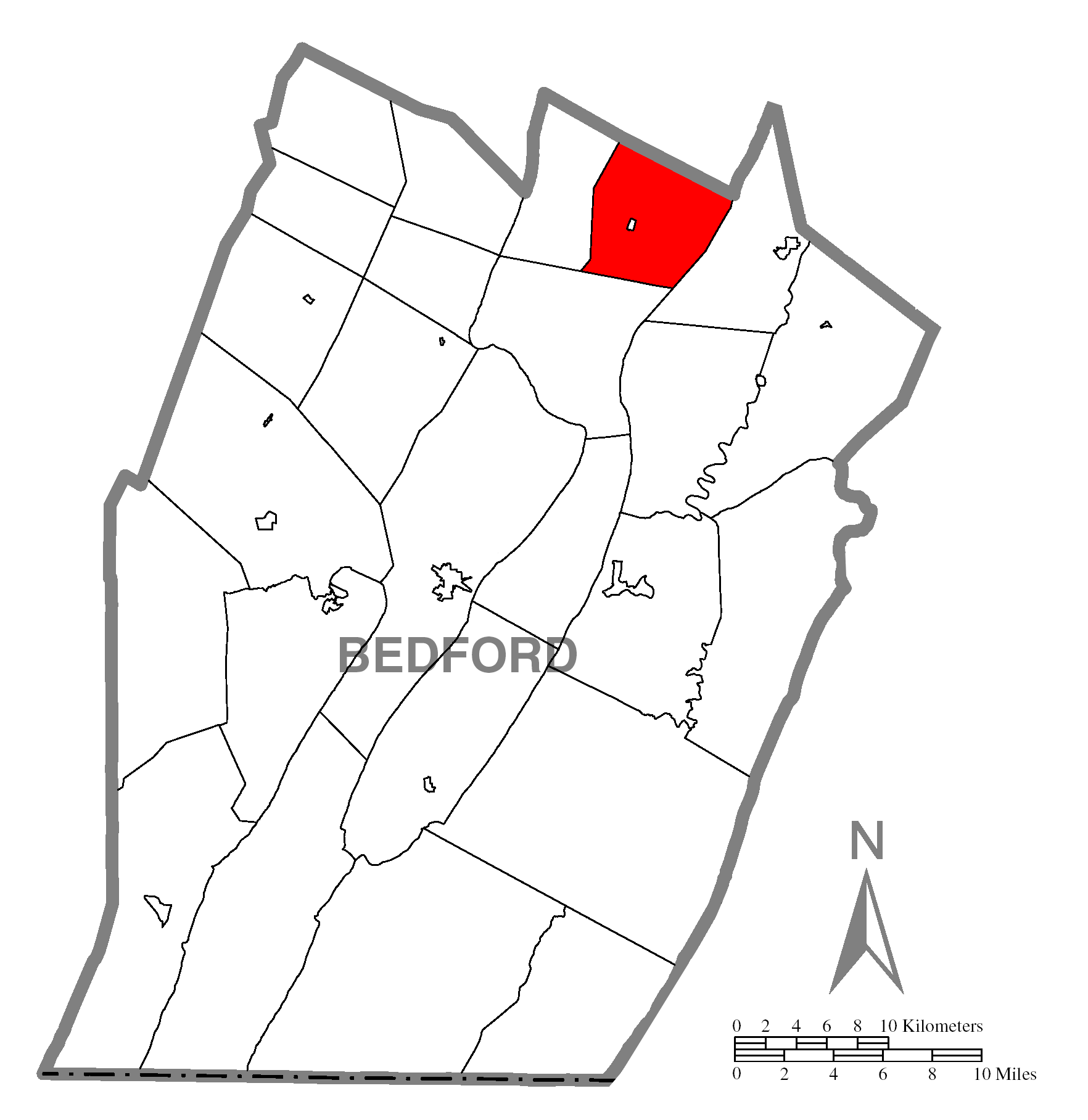
- Map of Bedford County, Pennsylvania highlighting Woodbury Township

- Map of Bedford County, Pennsylvania
- Country: United States
- State: Pennsylvania
- County: Bedford
- Settled: 1760
- Incorporated: 1785

Area
  - Total: 23.44 sq mi (60.72 km^{2})
  - Land: 23.42 sq mi (60.67 km^{2})
  - Water: 0.023 sq mi (0.06 km^{2})

Population (2020)
  - Total: 1,181 ▼
  - Estimate (2023): 1,186
  - Density: 52.9/sq mi (20.42/km^{2})
- Time zone: UTC-5 (Eastern (EST))
  - Summer (DST): UTC-4 (EDT)
- Area code: 814
- FIPS code: 42-009-86136

Woodbury Township is a township that is located in Bedford County, Pennsylvania, United States. As of the 2020 census, the population was 1,181.

== Geography ==
Woodbury Township is located in northern Bedford County and is bordered by Blair County to the north. It is part of the area known as Morrisons Cove.

The township's eastern border follows the crest of Tussey Mountain. The borough of Woodbury is located near the center of the township but is separate from it.

According to the United States Census Bureau, Woodbury Township has a total area of 23.4 square miles (60.7 km^{2}), of which 0.023 square miles (0.06 km^{2}), or 0.09%, is water.

=== Recreation ===
Portions of the Pennsylvania State Game Lands Number 41 are located along the western border of the township and portions of Game Lands Number 73 are located along the eastern end of the township.

== Demographics ==
Historical population
Census	Pop.	Note	%±
2010	1,263		—
2020	1,181		−6.5%
2023 (est.)	1,186		0.4%
U.S. Decennial Census

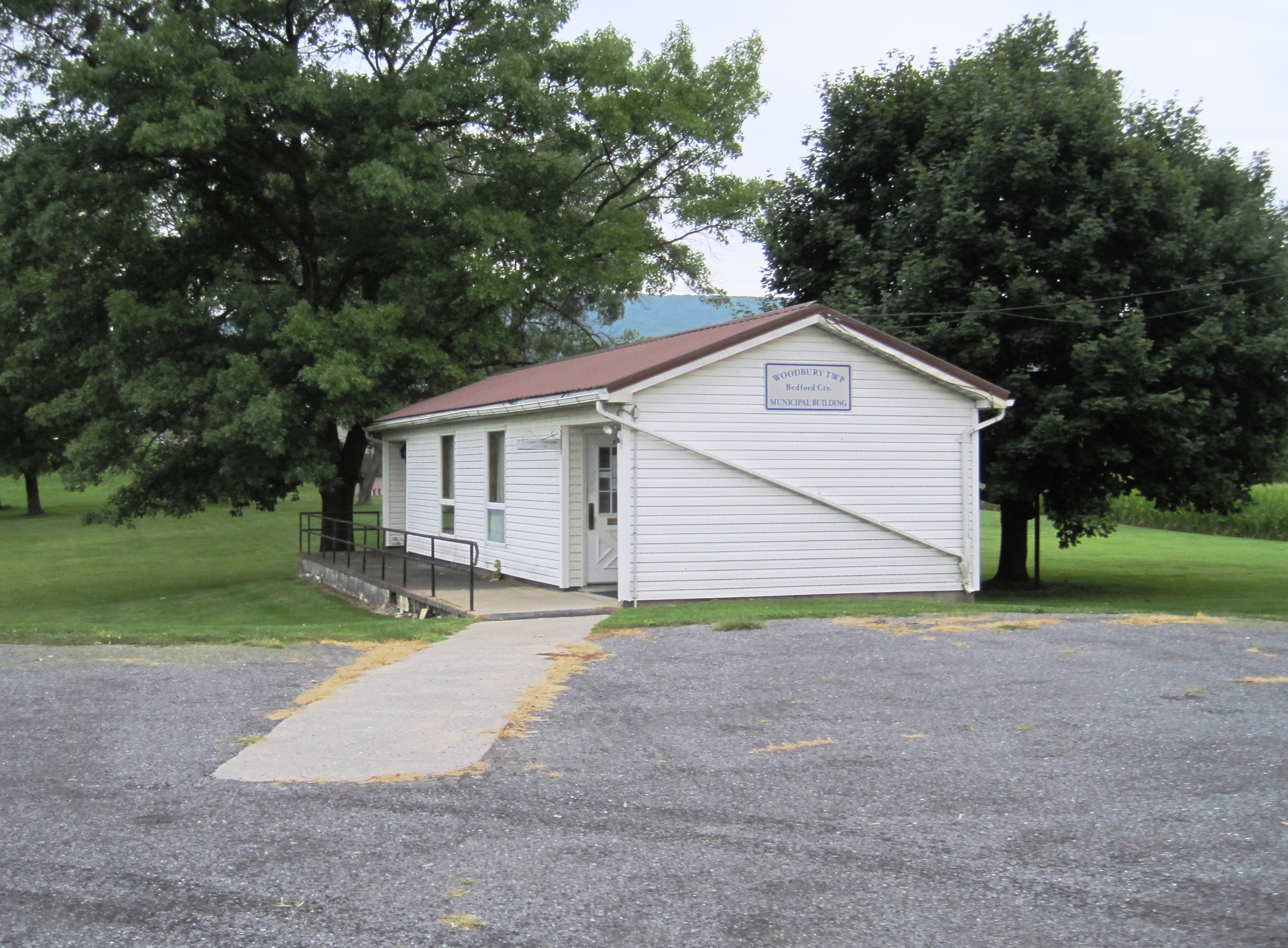
Woodbury Township Hall

As of the census of 2000, there were 1,198 people, 388 households, and 327 families residing in the township.

The population density was 50.6 inhabitants per square mile (19.5/km^{2}). There were 409 housing units at an average density of units with an overall average density of 17.3 units per sq mi (6.7/km^{2}).

The racial makeup of the township was 97.08% White, 0.25% Native American, 1.17% Asian, 1.25% from other races, and 0.25% from two or more races. Hispanic or Latino of any race were 1.59% of the population.

There were 388 households, out of which 42.3% had children under the age of 18 living with them, 77.3% were married couples living together, 4.6% had a female householder with no husband present, and 15.7% were non-families. 14.9% of all households were made up of individuals, and 6.7% had someone living alone who was 65 years of age or older.

The average household size was 3.09 and the average family size was 3.45.

In the township the population was spread out, with 34.2% under the age of 18, 6.2% from 18 to 24, 27.5% from 25 to 44, 19.7% from 45 to 64, and 12.4% who were 65 years of age or older. The median age was 33 years.

For every 100 females there were 98.7 males. For every 100 females age 18 and over, there were 100.5 males.

The median income for a household in the township was $38,250, and the median income for a family was $41,458. Males had a median income of $29,438 versus $19,943 for females.

The per capita income for the township was $13,885.

Approximately 8.4% of families and 12.0% of the population were living below the poverty line, including 16.8% of those under the age of 18 and 18.5% of those aged 65 or older.
