= Monroe Township, Bedford County, Pennsylvania =

Township in Pennsylvania, US

Coordinates: 39°53′00″N 78°21′59″W

- Township
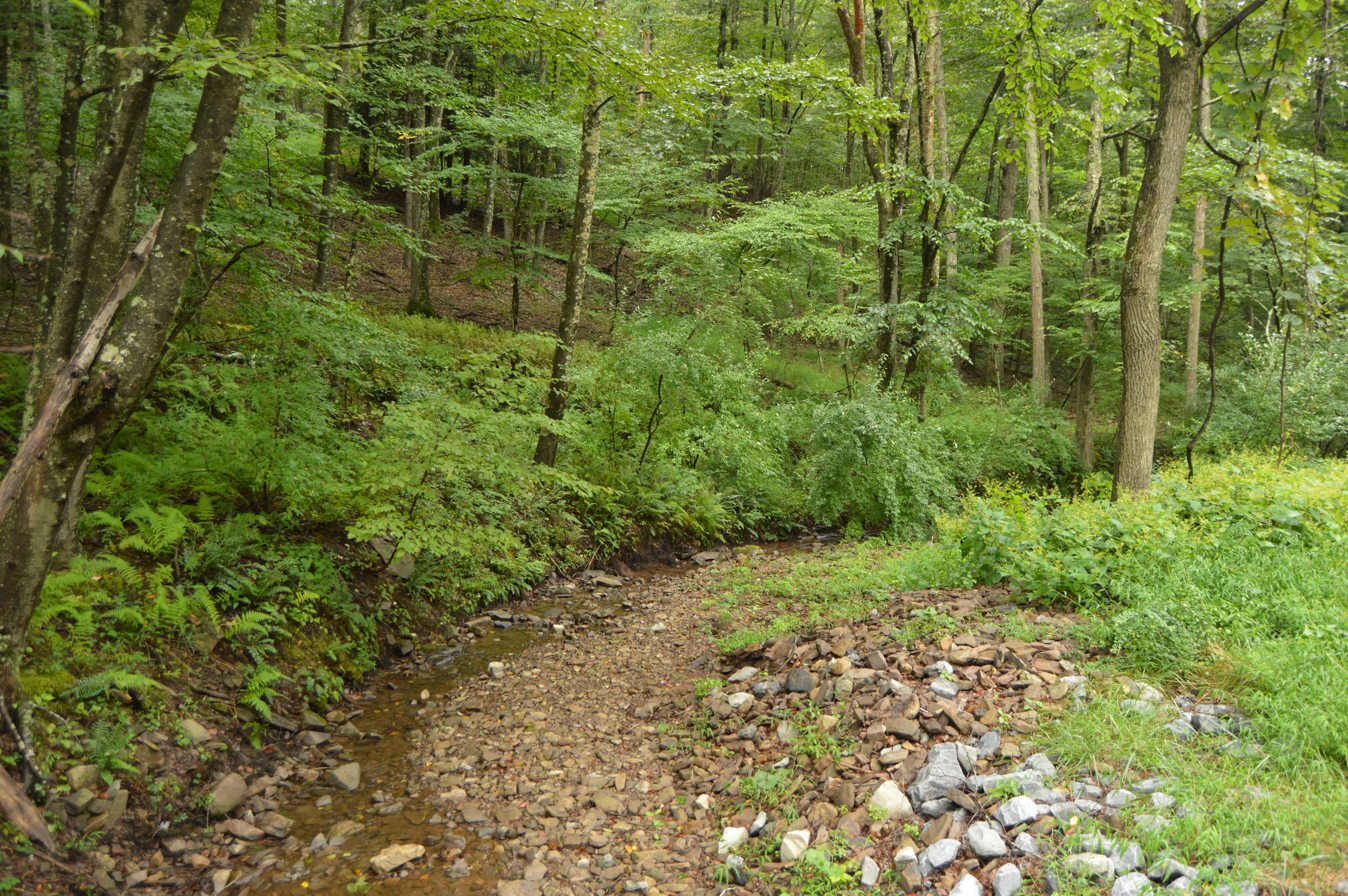
- Creek on Rays Hill in State Game Lands 49

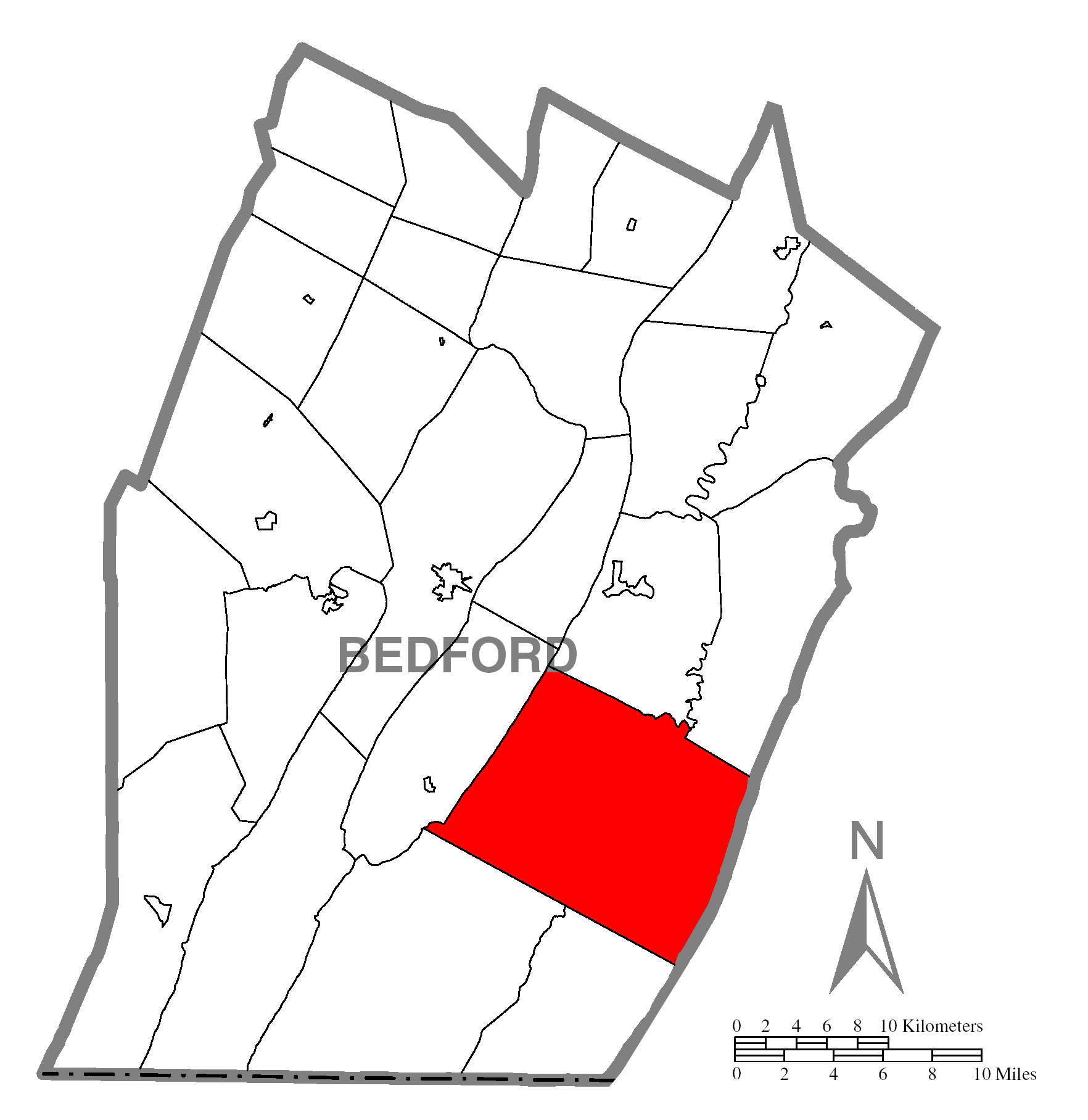
- Map of Bedford County, Pennsylvania highlighting Monroe Township

- Map of Bedford County, Pennsylvania
- Country: United States
- State: Pennsylvania
- County: Bedford
- Settled: 1793
- Incorporated: 1840

Area
  - Total: 87.39 sq mi (226.33 km^{2})
  - Land: 87.29 sq mi (226.08 km^{2})
  - Water: 0.097 sq mi (0.25 km^{2})

Population (2020)
  - Total: 1,398 ▲
  - Estimate (2023): 1,401
  - Density: 14.8/sq mi (5.72/km^{2})
- Time zone: UTC-5 (Eastern (EST))
  - Summer (DST): UTC-4 (EDT)
- Area code: 814
- FIPS code: 42-009-50424

Monroe Township is a township in Bedford County, Pennsylvania, United States. The population was 1,398 at the 2020 census.

== Geography ==
Monroe Township occupies a large area in southeastern Bedford County. Its eastern border follows the crest of Rays Hill and is also the Bedford County–Fulton County line. The western border of the township follows the parallel crest of Tussey Mountain. Ten other named ridges, all parallel, occupy the rest of the township.

The unincorporated community of Clearville is located in north-central Monroe Township, along Pennsylvania Route 26.

According to the United States Census Bureau, the township has a total area of 87.7 square miles (227.1 km^{2}), of which 87.6 square miles (226.8 km^{2}) is land and 0.077 square miles (0.2 km^{2}), or 0.11%, is water.

=== Adjacent municipalities ===
- Mann Township (southeast)
- Southampton Township (southwest)
- Colerain Township (west)
- West Providence Township (northwest)
- East Providence Township (northeast)
- Brush Creek Township, Fulton County (east)
- Union Township, Fulton County (southeast)

== Recreation ==
Portions of the Buchanan State Forest, Pennsylvania State Game Lands Number 49 and Number 97 are located in the township.

== Demographics ==
Historical population
Census	Pop.	Note	%±
2010	1,336		—
2020	1,398		4.6%
2023 (est.)	1,401		0.2%
U.S. Decennial Census

As of the census of 2000, there were 1,372 people, 507 households, and 404 families residing in the township. The population density was 15.6 people per square mile (6.0 people/km^{2}). There were 672 housing units at an average density of 7.6 units per square mile (2.9 units/km^{2}). The racial makeup of the township was 97.81% White, 0.29% African American, 0.36% Native American, 0.15% Asian, and 1.38% from two or more races. Hispanic or Latino of any race were 0.58% of the population.

There were 507 households, out of which 34.1% had children under the age of 18 living with them, 69.4% were married couples living together, 6.1% had a female householder with no husband present, and 20.3% were non-families. 18.3% of all households were made up of individuals, and 9.1% had someone living alone who was 65 years of age or older. The average household size was 2.71 and the average family size was 3.07.

In the township the population was spread out, with 24.5% under the age of 18, 7.6% from 18 to 24, 27.9% from 25 to 44, 25.7% from 45 to 64, and 14.4% who were 65 years of age or older. The median age was 40 years. For every 100 females, there were 103.6 males. For every 100 females age 18 and over, there were 101.6 males.

The median income for a household in the township was $31,313, and the median income for a family was $34,911. Males had a median income of $25,257 versus $16,550 for females. The per capita income for the township was $14,160. About 2.0% of families and 4.2% of the population were below the poverty line, including 3.6% of those under age 18 and 7.4% of those age 65 or over.
