= Pennsylvania State Game Lands Number 49 =

Park in the United States

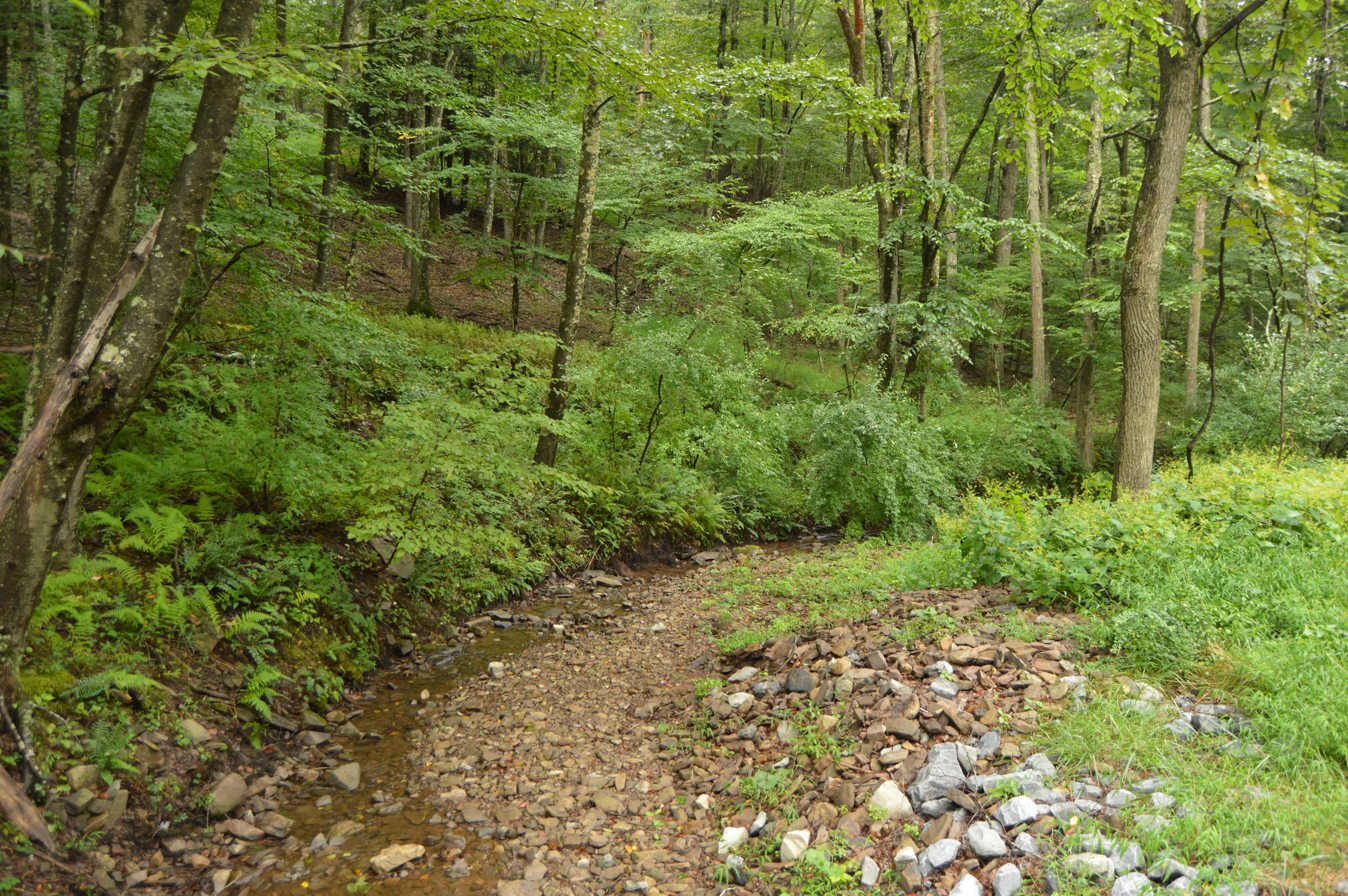
- Creek along Amaranth Road in Bedford County

- Location within Pennsylvania Location within the United States
- Location: Bedford and Fulton Counties, Pennsylvania
- Nearest town: Hyndman, Manns Choice
- Coordinates: 39°47′30″N 78°20′4″W
- Area: 6,393 acres (2,587 ha)
- Elevation: 1,204 feet (367 m)
- Max. elevation: 1,948 feet (594 m)
- Min. elevation: 960 feet (290 m)
- Owner: Pennsylvania Game Commission
- Website: www.pgc.pa.gov/HuntTrap/StateGameLands/Documents/SGL%20Maps/SGL__49.pdf

The Pennsylvania State Game Lands Number 49 are Pennsylvania State Game Lands in Bedford and Fulton Counties in Pennsylvania in the United States providing hunting, bird watching, and other activities.

== Geography ==
SGL 49 consists of five parcels located in Mann and Monroe Townships in Bedford County and Union Township in Fulton County near the villages of Amaranth, Barnes Gap, Buck Valley, Inglesmith, Lashley, Purcell, Robinsonville, Silver Mills. The largest parcel straddles more than 4 miles (6.4 km) of Town Hill along the border of Bradford and Fulton Counties and it shares a portion of its border with Buchanan State Forest, a small portion of SGL 49 lies to the northeast of the Forest. to the west other parcels are located on Rays Hill, Addison Ridge, and Hoop Pole Ridge. The Game Lands lie within the Potomac River watershed. Interstate 70 runs northeast of the Game Lands, Pennsylvania Route 484 is to the southeast, Pennsylvania Route 26 is to the southwest. Pennsylvania State Game Lands Number 65 is just a couple of miles to the east of the upper parcel.

== Statistics ==
SGL 49 was entered into the Geographic Names Information System on 2 August 1979 as identification number 1193456, its elevation is listed as 1,893 feet (577 m). Elevations range from 760 feet (230 m) to 1,948 feet (594 m). It consists of 6,393 acres (2,587 ha) in two parcels.

== Biology ==
Hunting and furtaking species include white-tailed deer (Odocoileus virginianus), ruffed grouse (Bonasa umbellus), gray squirrel (Sciurus carolinensis), and turkey (Meleagris gallopavo).

== See also ==
- Pennsylvania State Game Lands
- Pennsylvania State Game Lands Number 26, also located in Bedford County
- Pennsylvania State Game Lands Number 41, also located in Bedford County
- Pennsylvania State Game Lands Number 48, also located in Bedford County
- Pennsylvania State Game Lands Number 73, also located in Bedford County
- Pennsylvania State Game Lands Number 97, also located in Bedford County
- Pennsylvania State Game Lands Number 104, also located in Bedford County
- Pennsylvania State Game Lands Number 261, also located in Bedford County
