= Earlston, Pennsylvania =

Unincorporated community in Pennsylvania, US

- Census-designated place
- Location within the state of Pennsylvania Earlston (the United States)
- Coordinates: 40°00′06″N 78°22′42″W
- Country: United States
- State: Pennsylvania
- County: Bedford
- Township: West Providence

Area
  - Total: 1.08 sq mi (2.80 km^{2})
  - Land: 1.08 sq mi (2.80 km^{2})
  - Water: 0 sq mi (0.00 km^{2})
- Elevation: 1,175 ft (358 m)

Population (2020)
  - Total: 1,049
  - Density: 970/sq mi (375/km^{2})
- Time zone: UTC-5 (Eastern (EST))
  - Summer (DST): UTC-4 (EDT)
- ZIP code: 15537
- Area code: 814
- FIPS code: 42-20704
- GNIS feature ID: 2633663

Earlston is a census-designated place in West Providence Township, Bedford County, Pennsylvania, in the United States. The population was 1,049 as of the 2020 census. It is located just across the Raystown Branch of the Juniata River from the borough of Everett.

== Demographics ==
Historical population
Census	Pop.	Note	%±
2020	1,049		—
U.S. Decennial Census
