= Cumberland Valley Township, Bedford County, Pennsylvania =

Township in Pennsylvania, US

Coordinates: 39°54′00″N 78°36′59″W

Cumberland Valley Township, Pennsylvania
- Township
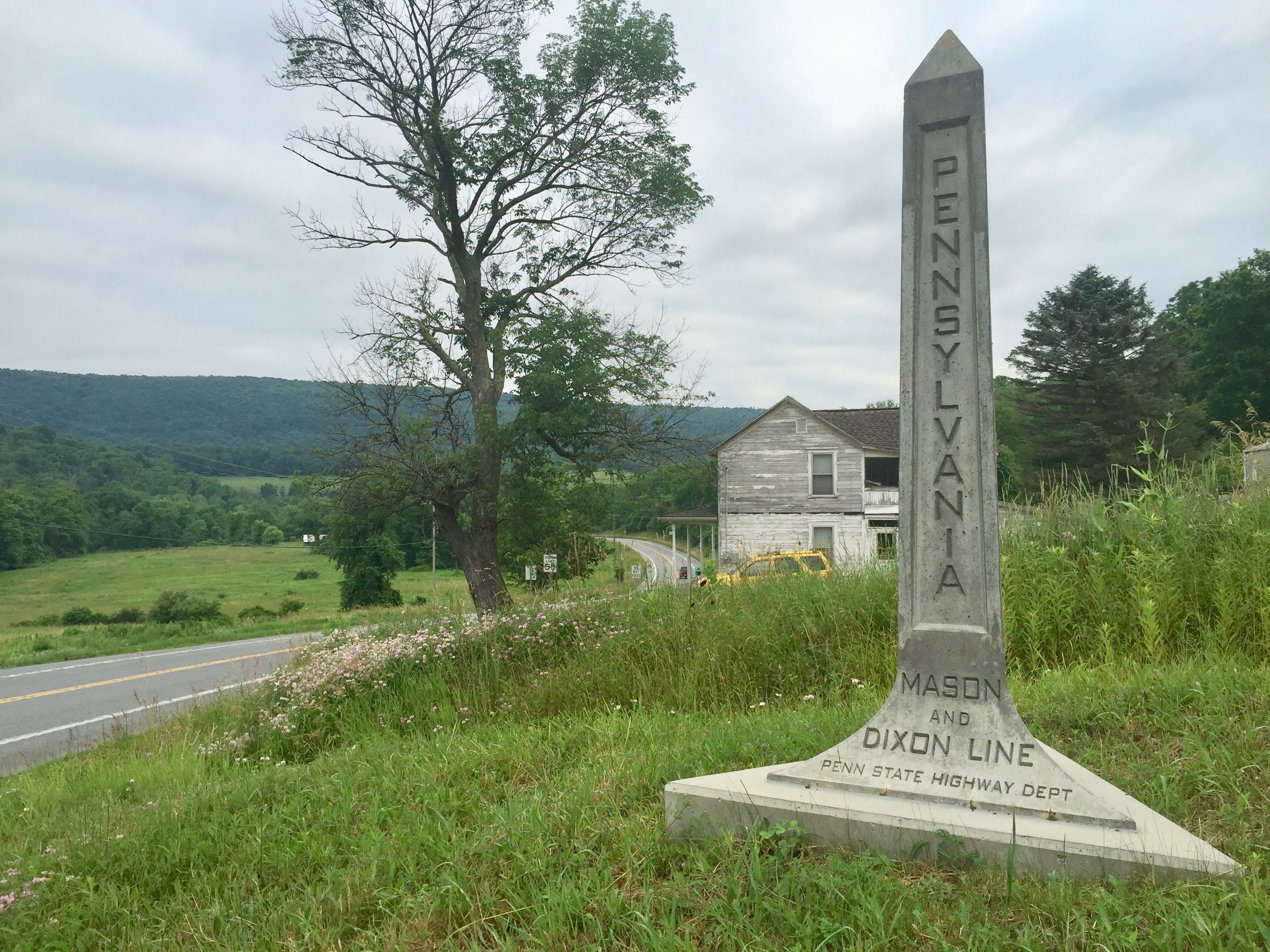
- Mason–Dixon line

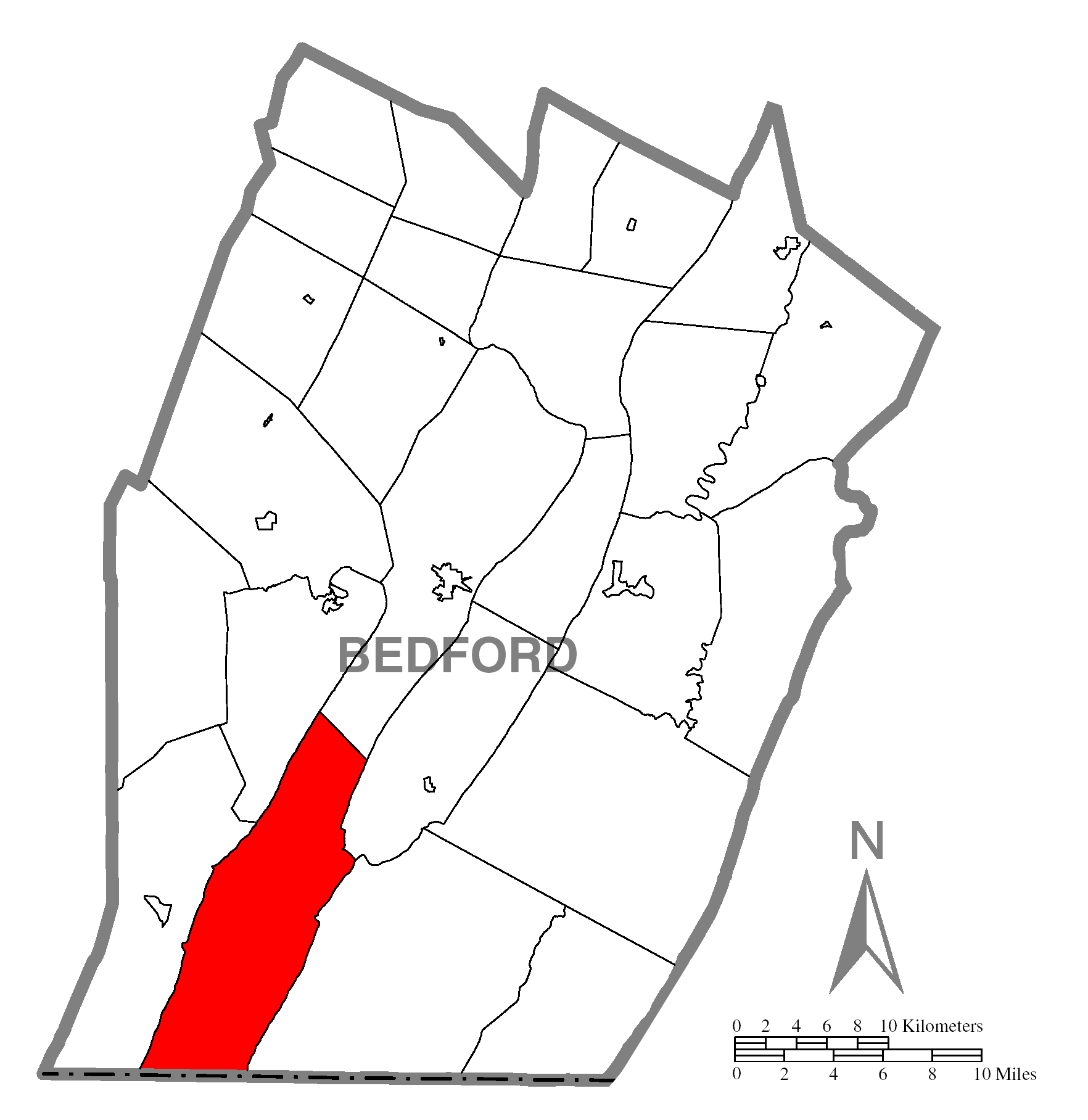
- Map of Bedford County, Pennsylvania highlighting Cumberland Valley Township

- Map of Bedford County, Pennsylvania
- Country: United States
- State: Pennsylvania
- County: Bedford
- Settled: 1771
- Incorporated: 1771

Area
  - Total: 60.25 sq mi (156.04 km^{2})
  - Land: 59.66 sq mi (154.51 km^{2})
  - Water: 0.59 sq mi (1.52 km^{2})

Population (2020)
  - Total: 1,452 ▼
  - Estimate (2023): 1,441
  - Density: 26.0/sq mi (10.04/km^{2})
- Time zone: UTC-5 (Eastern (EST))
  - Summer (DST): UTC-4 (EDT)
- Area code: 814
- FIPS code: 42-009-17664
- Website: cumberlandvalleytwp.com

Cumberland Valley Township is a township in Bedford County, Pennsylvania, United States. The population was 1,452 at the 2020 census.

== Geography ==
The township is located in southern Bedford County in the Cumberland Valley, a narrow Appalachian valley bounded by Wills Mountain to the west and Evitts Mountain to the east. Evitts Creek, a tributary of the North Branch Potomac River, flows southwards through the valley, and U.S. Route 220 passes through the center of the valley as well.

According to the United States Census Bureau, the township has a total area of 60.2 square miles (156.0 km^{2}), of which 59.7 square miles (154.5 km^{2}) is land and 0.58 square miles (1.5 km^{2}), or 0.98%, is water.

=== Adjacent municipalities ===
- Harrison Township (northwest)
- Bedford Township (north)
- Colerain Township (northeast)
- Southampton Township (east)
- Londonderry Township (west)
- Allegany County, Maryland (south)

== Recreation ==
A portion of the Buchanan State Forest and portions of the Pennsylvania State Game Lands Number 48 and Number 104 are located in the township.

== Demographics ==
Historical population
Census	Pop.	Note	%±
2010	1,597		—
2020	1,452		−9.1%
2023 (est.)	1,441		−0.8%
U.S. Decennial Census

As of the census of 2000, there were 1,494 people, 596 households, and 448 families residing in the township. The population density was 9.7 people/km^{2} (25 people/mi^{2}). There were 710 housing units at an average density of 4.6 inhabitants per square kilometre (12 inhabitants/mi^{2}). The racial makeup of the township was 99.13% White, 0.07% African American, 0.00% Native American, 0.54% Asian, 0.00% Pacific Islander, 0.07% from other races, and 0.20% from two or more races. 0.27% of the population were Hispanic or Latino of any race.

There were 596 households, out of which 27.3% had children under the age of 18 living with them, 66.6% were married couples living together, 4.9% had a female householder with no husband present, and 24.7% were non-families. 22.5% of all households were made up of individuals, and 10.6% had someone living alone who was 65 years of age or older. The average household size was 2.51 and the average family size was 2.91.

In the township the population was spread out, with 23.1% under the age of 18, 7.1% from 18 to 24, 26.4% from 25 to 44, 27.1% from 45 to 64, and 16.3% who were 65 years of age or older. The median age was 41 years. For every 100 females, there were 107.2 males. For every 100 females age 18 and over, there were 103.4 males.

The median income for a household in the township was $35,268, and the median income for a family was $40,060. Males had a median income of $29,926 versus $21,023 for females. The per capita income for the township was $17,768. About 6.7% of families and 9.8% of the population were below the poverty line, including 13.5% of those under age 18 and 7.7% of those age 65 or over.
