= Rainsburg, Pennsylvania =

Borough in Pennsylvania, US

- Borough
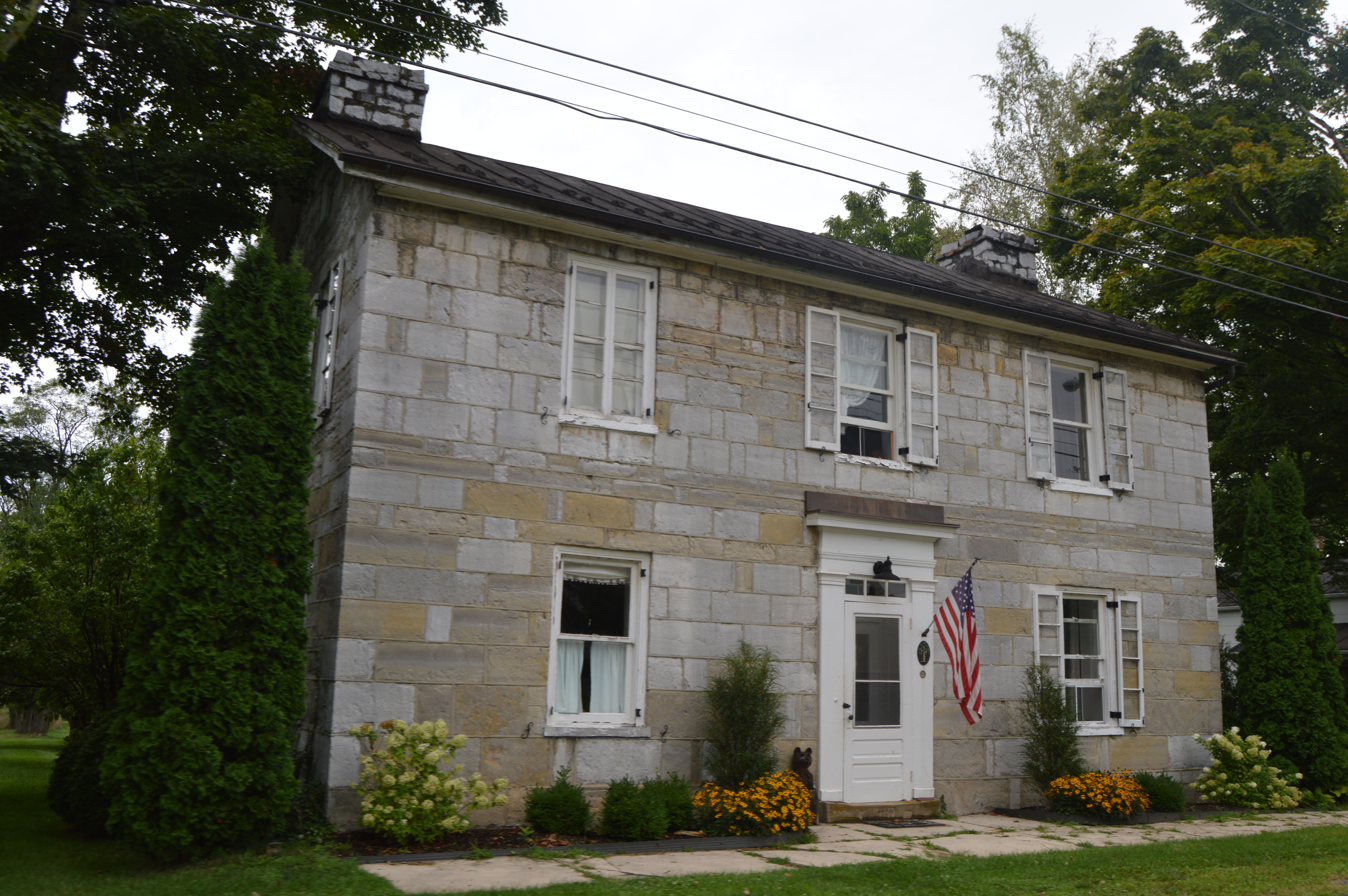
- Early stone house on Main Road

- Location of Rainsburg in Bedford County, Pennsylvania.

- Location within Pennsylvania
- Coordinates: 39°53′43″N 78°30′57″W
- Country: United States
- State: Pennsylvania
- County: Bedford
- Incorporated: September 1, 1856

Government
  - Type: Borough Council

Area
  - Total: 0.16 sq mi (0.42 km^{2})
  - Land: 0.16 sq mi (0.42 km^{2})
  - Water: 0 sq mi (0.00 km^{2})
- Elevation: 2,031 ft (619 m)

Population (2020)
  - Total: 141
  - Density: 867.6/sq mi (334.97/km^{2})
- Time zone: UTC-5 (Eastern (EST))
  - Summer (DST): UTC-4 (EDT)
- Area code: 814
- FIPS code: 42-63312

Rainsburg is a borough in Bedford County, Pennsylvania, United States. The population was 141 at the 2020 census.

== History ==
Rainsburg takes its name from Conrad Rain, its first inhabitant who lived in a round log building and arrived some time before 1786, when he was joined by Captain Jacob Adams and his wife Loretta Dustimer. The Adams arrived from Loudoun County, Virginia following Jacob's service during the Revolutionary War with the 7th Virginia Regiment. Jacob built the first hewed-log house in Rainsburg. (That hewed-log house would be replaced by Samuel Williams with a frame house in 1854).

Also among the first settlers in Rainsburg was James Donahoe, who arrived sometime before 1800 and operated a tannery, store, and hotel. Over time, additional merchants arrived in town including Elias Gump who arrived in 1818 from Frederick County, Maryland, to operate a carpentry business and became justice of the peace. Elias's relative John Gump, also came and opened a tannery - eventually purchasing Donahue's tannery as well. By 1825, there were approximately a dozen houses in Rainsburg, which continued to grow to obtain borough status in 1856.

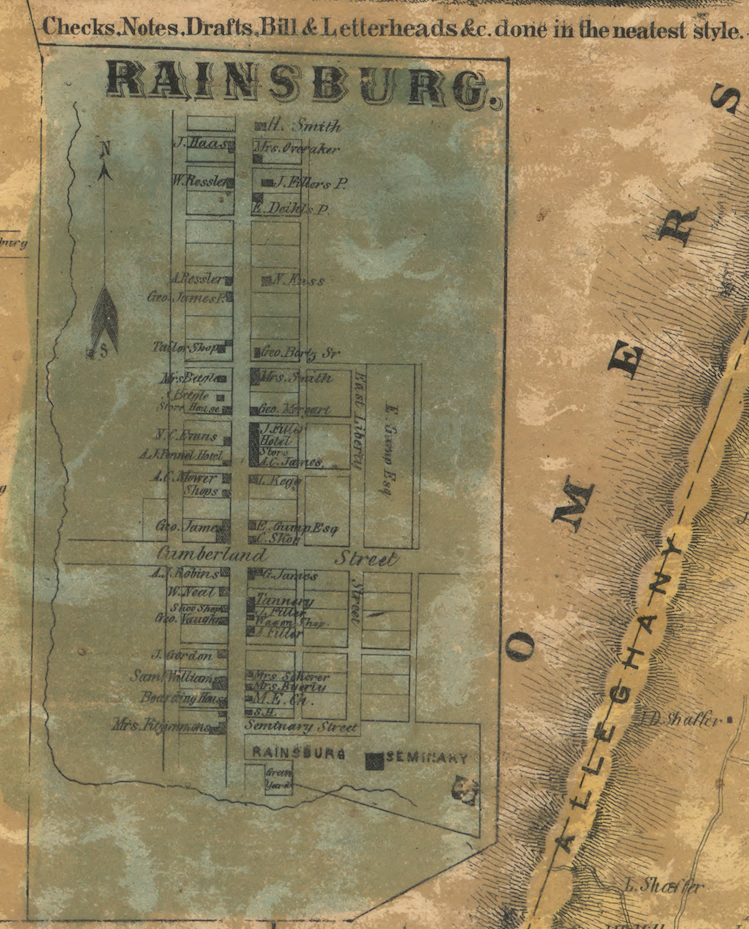
Map of Rainsburg in 1861

Notably, Rainsburg was home to the Allegheny Male and Female Seminary, founded by Samuel Williams, who arrived in Rainsburg in 1844 and raised funds to establish the school by selling 138 shares of stock with a par value of $25. The school, often referred to as Rainsburg Seminary, was chartered in 1853 by the Pennsylvania State Legislature with trustees Jacob Barndollar, George Slicer, J. W. Crawford, A. C. James, W. S. Cunningham, George Bortz, Elias Gump, C. Graham, and Williams. A Methodist-affiliated institution, the school was very successful for a short time. However, as most of its students came from the South and national tensions soared in advance of the Civil War, the school encountered serious retention problems. Upon the outbreak of the Civil War, the students from Maryland and Virginia withdrew, and others enlisted in the military. The school was then closed, and the property was sold by the sheriff sometime after 1867. In 1875, the community school moved into the seminary building, which later housed the Independent Order of Odd Fellows Lodge #730. The seminary building, which is now a residence, features a pedimented gable end with fanlight and cupola above as well as a one-story full-facade porch over the seminary's entrance. The window in the second story's central bay features four-pane surrounds in contrast to the double-sash, six-over-six windows throughout the rest of the exterior. The interior features a broad central solid oak staircase, which reaches to the small octagonal louvered belfry.

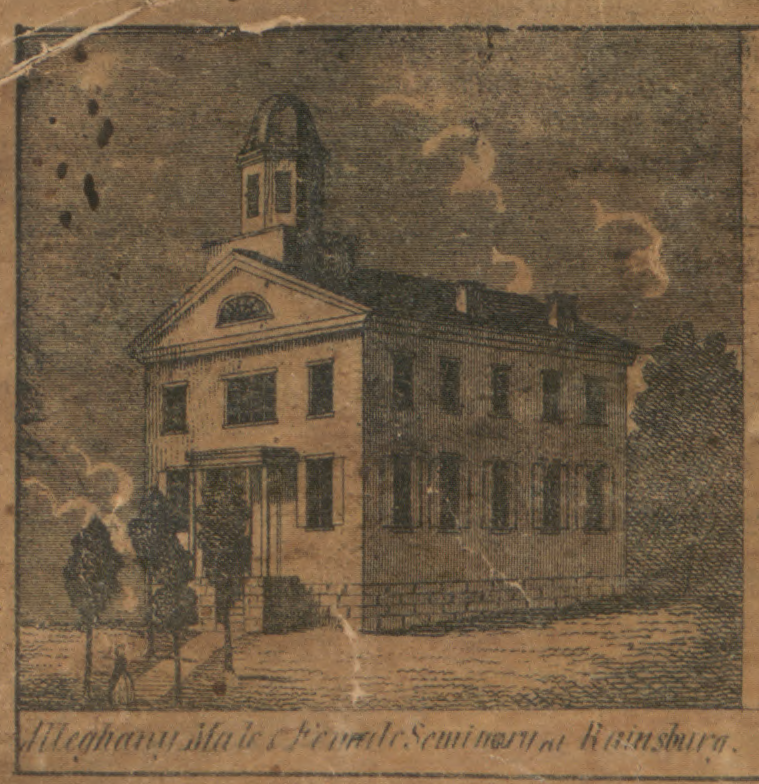
Etch of Alleghany Male & Female Seminary - 1861

In addition to the seminary, Rainsburg features a high number of churches for its population size. It is the only town in Central Pennsylvania to have had church buildings for each of the Methodist Episcopal Church (ME), Methodist Episcopal Church, South(MES) and Methodist Protestant Church (MP) denominations. While each denomination shared a circa 1810 union log structure, but one-by-one they gradually erected their own structures. The first MP Cove church was erected in 1837, expanded in 1842, and replaced by the present building in 1870. The first ME stone church was erected in 1849, and the present brick building in 1878. In 1875 the MES congregation purchased a stone school building, which still stands to the right of the ME building, and worshiped there until erecting their frame church building in 1877. They sold the stone building in 1883 and the frame building in 1888, when it became known as Patriot’s Hall.

Throughout its history, Rainsburg has been home to several churches, stores, hotel, carriage manufactory, tannery, grist mill, and over 50 private residences. Rainsburg's original post office counter and mailboxes, previously located in the former Shipley Store, can be viewed today at the General Store & Post Office of the Bedford Village Archeological Site in nearby Bedford. Rainsburg and the Friends Cove valley in which it lies have long been home to a large number of Pennsylvania Germans including Lutheran, German Reformed, and Mennonite communities. Mennonite farms and businesses are still present in the town and surrounding area.

=== Churches ===
The following is a list of churches past or present in or around Rainsburg:

- Yeager Memorial Lutheran Church
- Friends Cove Mennonite Church
- Rainsburg Evangelical & Reformed Church (also known as "Cove Evangelical & Reformed Church")
- Rainsburg Methodist Episcopal Church (alternately known as "Cove Methodist Episcopal Church" & "Woods Methodist Episcopal Church")
- Rainsburg Methodist Protestant Church
- Rainsburg United Methodist Church,
- Rainsburg Community Church
- Rainsburg Assembly of God Church
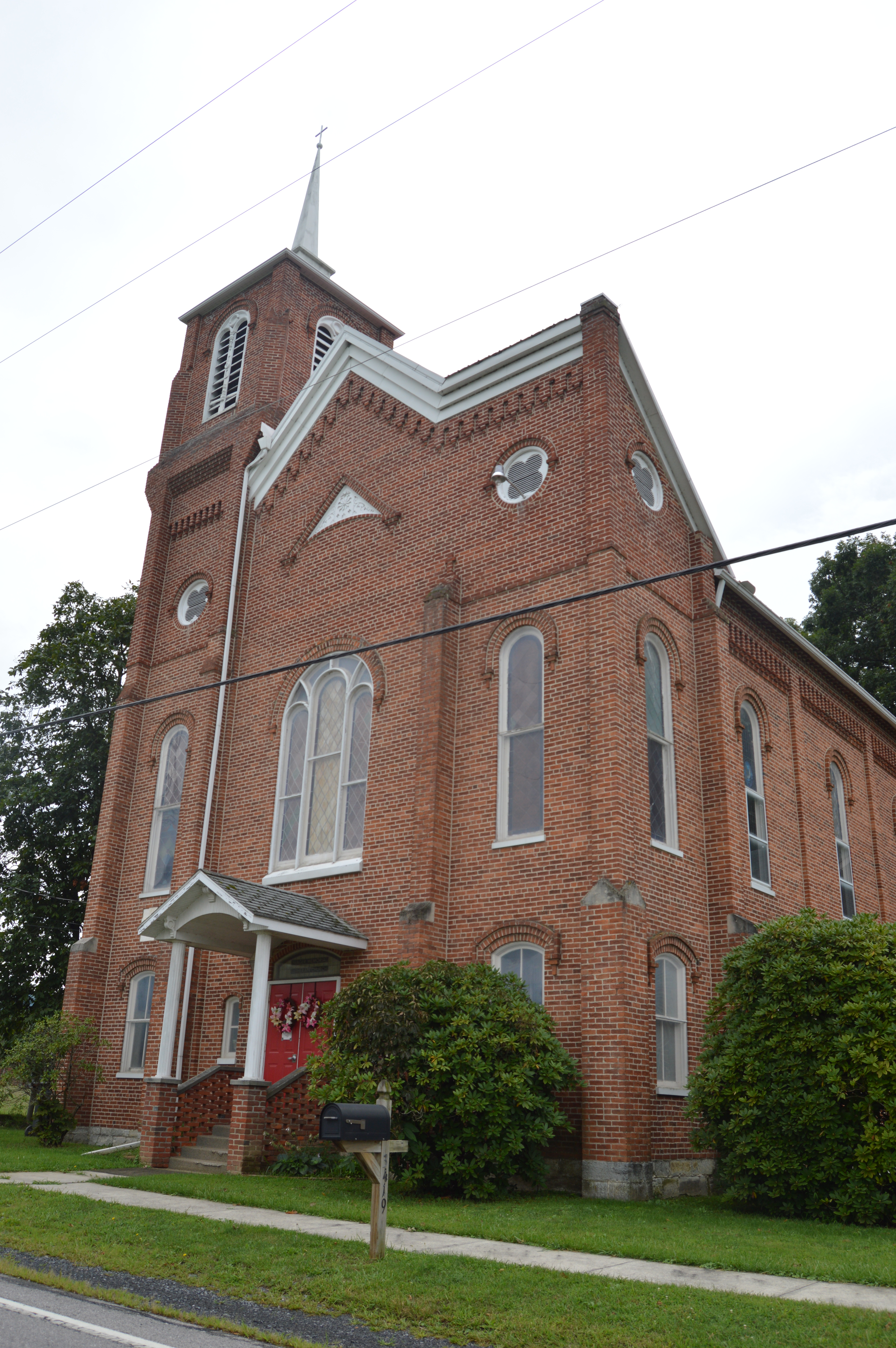
  Yeager Memorial Lutheran Church
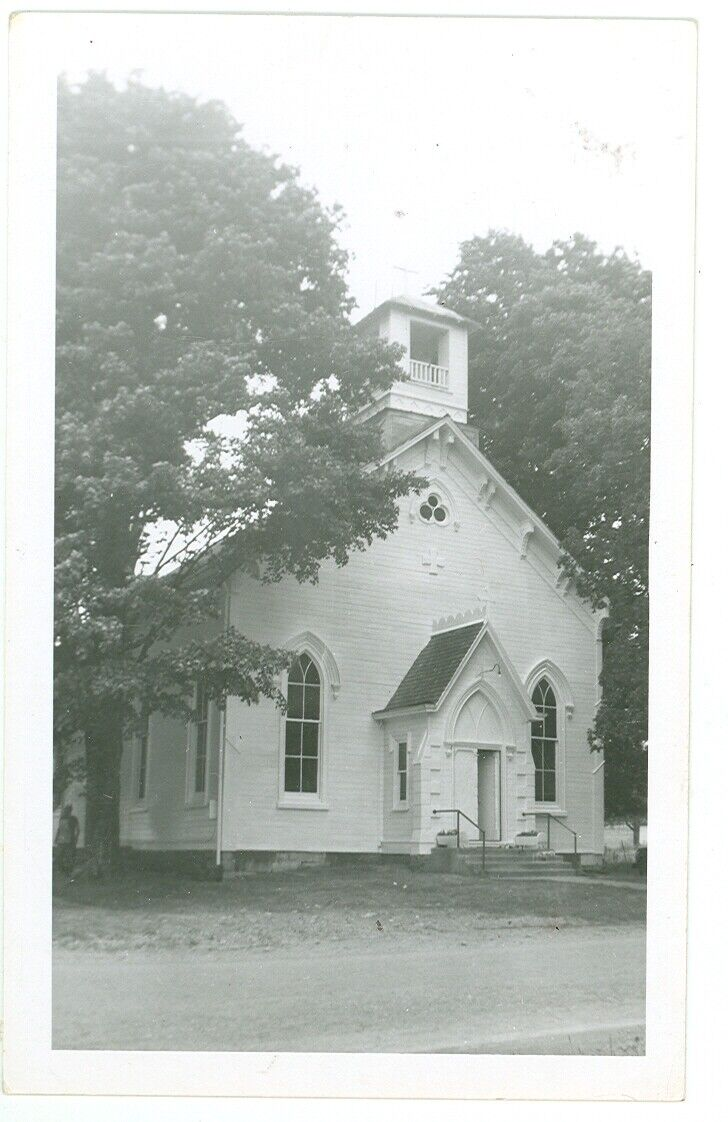
  Rainsburg Evangelical & Reformed Church

== Geography ==
Rainsburg is located in southern Bedford County at 39°53′43″N 78°30′57″W, within Colerain Township. It lies at the southern end of a valley called Friends Cove, between Tussey Mountain to the east and Evitts Mountain to the west. Rainsburg borders the Buchanan State Forest.

Pennsylvania Route 326 passes through the borough, leading north 11 miles (18 km) to Bedford, the county seat, and south 16 miles (26 km) to Flintstone, Maryland.

According to the United States Census Bureau, Rainsburg has a total area of 0.16 square miles (0.42 km^{2}), all land.

== Demographics ==
Historical population
Census	Pop.	Note	%±
1870	250		—
1880	280		12.0%
1890	247		−11.8%
1900	219		−11.3%
1910	203		−7.3%
1920	186		−8.4%
1930	222		19.4%
1940	211		−5.0%
1950	189		−10.4%
1960	209		10.6%
1970	179		−14.4%
1980	201		12.3%
1990	175		−12.9%
2000	146		−16.6%
2010	133		−8.9%
2020	141		6.0%
2021 (est.)	138	▼	−2.1%

As of the census of 2000, there were 146 people, 57 households, and 38 families residing in the borough. The population density was 915.8 inhabitants per square mile (353.6/km^{2}). There were 66 housing units at an average density of 414.0 per square mile (159.8/km^{2}). The racial makeup of the borough was 100.00% White .

There were 57 households, out of which 21.1% had children under the age of 18 living with them, 52.6% were married couples living together, 10.5% had a female householder with no husband present, and 33.3% were non-families. 31.6% of all households were made up of individuals, and 17.5% had someone living alone who was 65 years of age or older. The average household size was 2.23 and the average family size was 2.74.

In the borough the population was spread out, with 18.5% under the age of 18, 4.1% from 18 to 24, 17.8% from 25 to 44, 28.1% from 45 to 64, and 31.5% who were 65 years of age or older. The median age was 54 years. For every 100 females there were 89.6 males. For every 100 females age 18 and over, there were 91.9 males.

The median income for a household in the borough was $25,278, and the median income for a family was $31,875. Males had a median income of $24,250 versus $11,250 for females. The per capita income for the borough was $11,448. There were 5.1% of families and 7.6% of the population living below the poverty line, including 8.0% of under eighteens and 10.0% of those over 64.
