= Mount Dallas, Pennsylvania =

Populated place in Pennsylvania, U.S.

Mount Dallas is a populated place in Bedford County, Pennsylvania, United States. It is located in the water gap of Tussey Mountain, approximately one mile (two kilometers) upstream of Everett along the Raystown Branch Juniata River. It was the northern terminus of the now dismantled Bedford and Bridgeport Railroad formerly controlled by the Pennsylvania Railroad, and was one of the main points for the planned South Pennsylvania Railroad that was never completed.

Mount Dallas is located at 40°0′43″N 78°23′42″W.
