= Southampton Township, Bedford County, Pennsylvania =

Township in Pennsylvania, US

Coordinates: 39°44′30″N 78°37′59″W

- Township
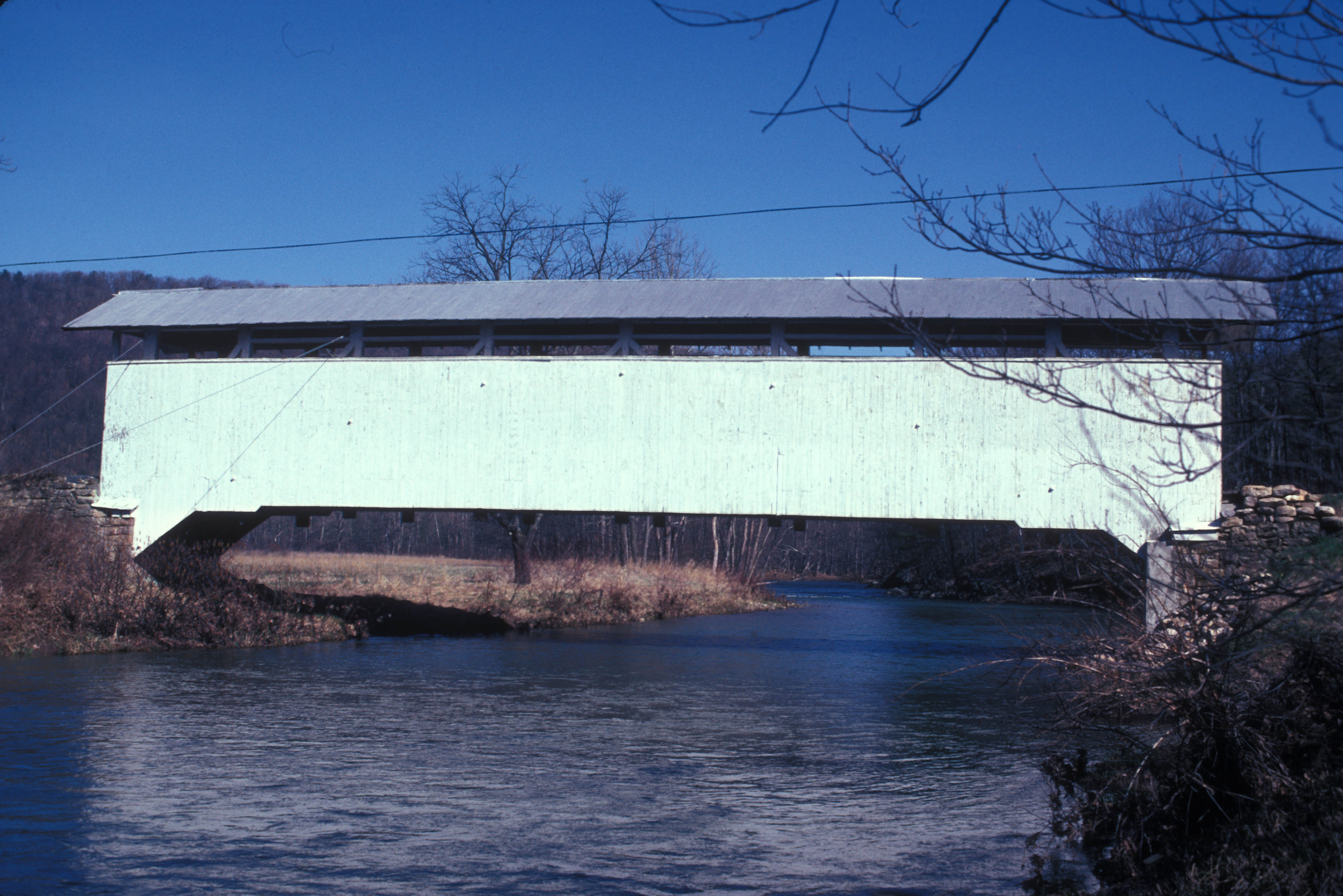
- Hewitt Covered Bridge

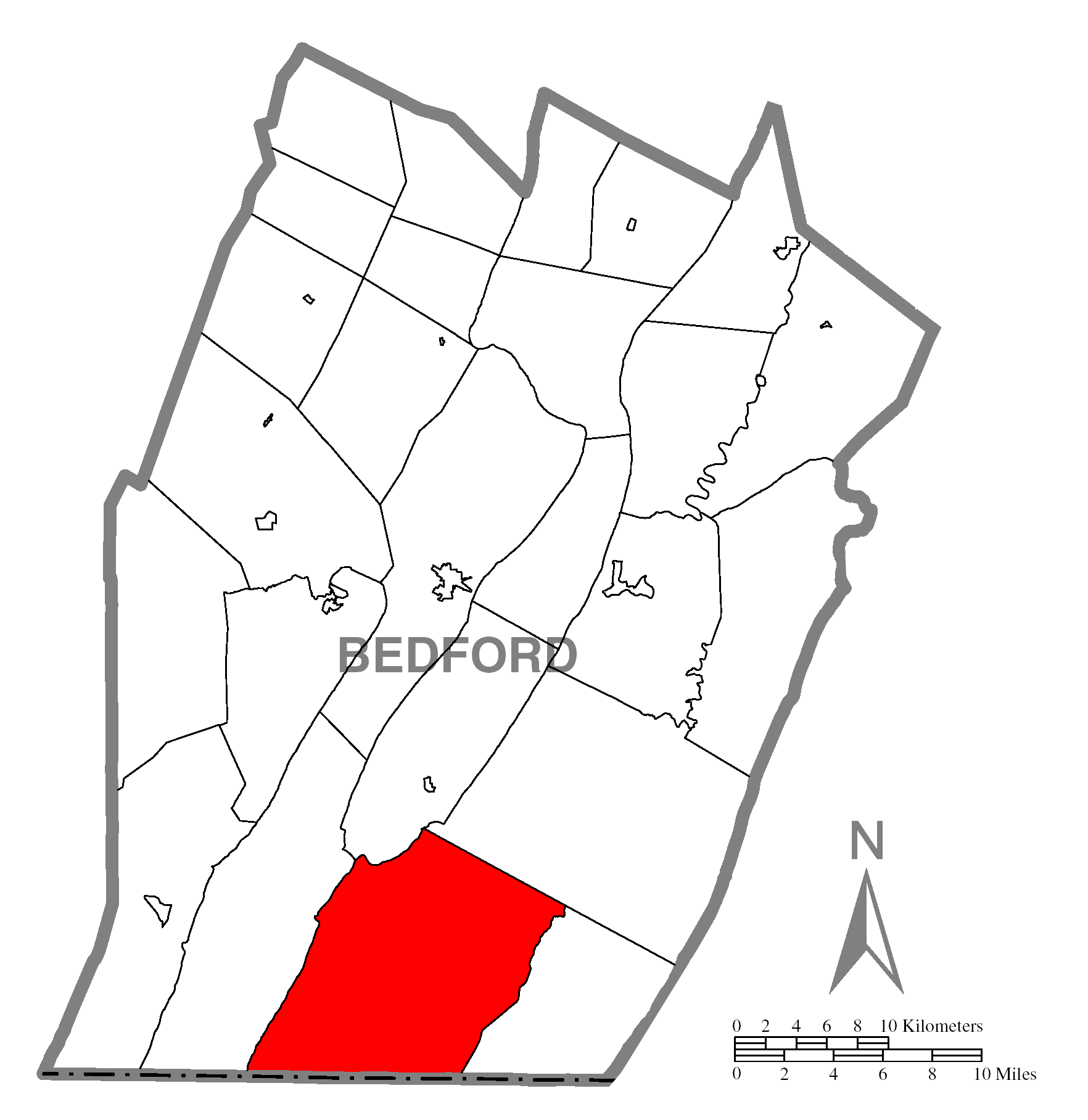
- Map of Bedford County, Pennsylvania highlighting Southampton Township

- Map of Bedford County, Pennsylvania
- Country: United States
- State: Pennsylvania
- County: Bedford
- Settled: 1776
- Incorporated: 1799

Area
  - Total: 80.19 sq mi (207.69 km^{2})
  - Land: 80.15 sq mi (207.60 km^{2})
  - Water: 0.039 sq mi (0.10 km^{2})

Population (2020)
  - Total: 844 ▼
  - Estimate (2023): 843
  - Density: 11.7/sq mi (4.52/km^{2})
- Time zone: UTC-5 (Eastern (EST))
  - Summer (DST): UTC-4 (EDT)
- Area code: 814
- FIPS code: 42-009-71888
- Website: Southampton Township

Southampton Township is a township that is located in Bedford County, Pennsylvania, United States. The population was 844 at the time of the 2020 census.

== History ==
The Hewitt Covered Bridge was listed on the National Register of Historic Places in 1980.

== Geography ==
Southampton Township is located in southern Bedford County, with the Maryland state line forming its southern boundary. It is bordered by Evitts Mountain on the west and by the lower Big Mountain and Ragged Mountain on the east.

Tussey Mountain rises in the middle of the township. Buchanan State Forest occupies the high ground on Evitts and Tussey Mountains and some other areas.

According to the United States Census Bureau, the township has a total area of 80.2 square miles (207.7 km^{2}), of which 80.2 square miles (207.6 km^{2}) is land and 0.04 square miles (0.1 km^{2}), or 0.05%, is water.

=== Adjacent municipalities ===
- Cumberland Valley Township (west)
- Colerain Township (north)
- Monroe Township (northeast)
- Mann Township (east)
- Allegany County, Maryland (south)

== Demographics ==
Historical population
Census	Pop.	Note	%±
2010	976		—
2020	844		−13.5%
2023 (est.)	843		−0.1%
U.S. Decennial Census

As of the census of 2000, there were 1,010 people, 376 households and 295 families residing in the township.

The population density was 12.6 per square mile (4.9/km^{2}). There were 526 housing units at an average density of 6.6/sq mi (2.5/km^{2}).

The racial makeup was 99.21% White, 0.20% African American, 0.30% Native American, 0.10% Asian, 0.10% from other races, and 0.10% from two or more races. Hispanic or Latino of any race were 0.50% of the population.

There were 376 households, out of which 35.1% had children who were under the age of eighteen living with them, 72.1% were married couples living together, 4.0% had a female householder with no husband present, and 21.5% were non-families. 17.6% of all households were made up of individuals, and 9.3% had someone living alone who was sixty-five years of age or older.

The average household size was 2.69 and the average family size was 3.04.

Within the township, the population was spread out, with 24.9% of residents who were under the age of eighteen, 6.5% who were aged eighteen to twenty-four, 30.8% who were aged twenty-five to forty-four, 23.7% who were aged forty-five to sixty-four, and 14.2% who were sixty-five years of age or older. The median age was thirty-eight years.

For every one hundred females, there were 107.0 males. For every one hundred females who were aged eighteen or older, there were 106.3 males.

The median income for a household in the township was $34,524, and the median income for a family was $36,667. Males had a median income of $26,750 compared with that of $17,381 for females.

The per capita income was $15,271.

Approximately 3.8% of families and 7.9% of the population were living below the poverty line, including 13.3% of those who were under the age of eighteen and 7.7% of those who were aged sixty-five or older.
