= Bedford Township, Pennsylvania =

Township in Pennsylvania, US

Coordinates: 40°00′02″N 78°32′29″W

- Township
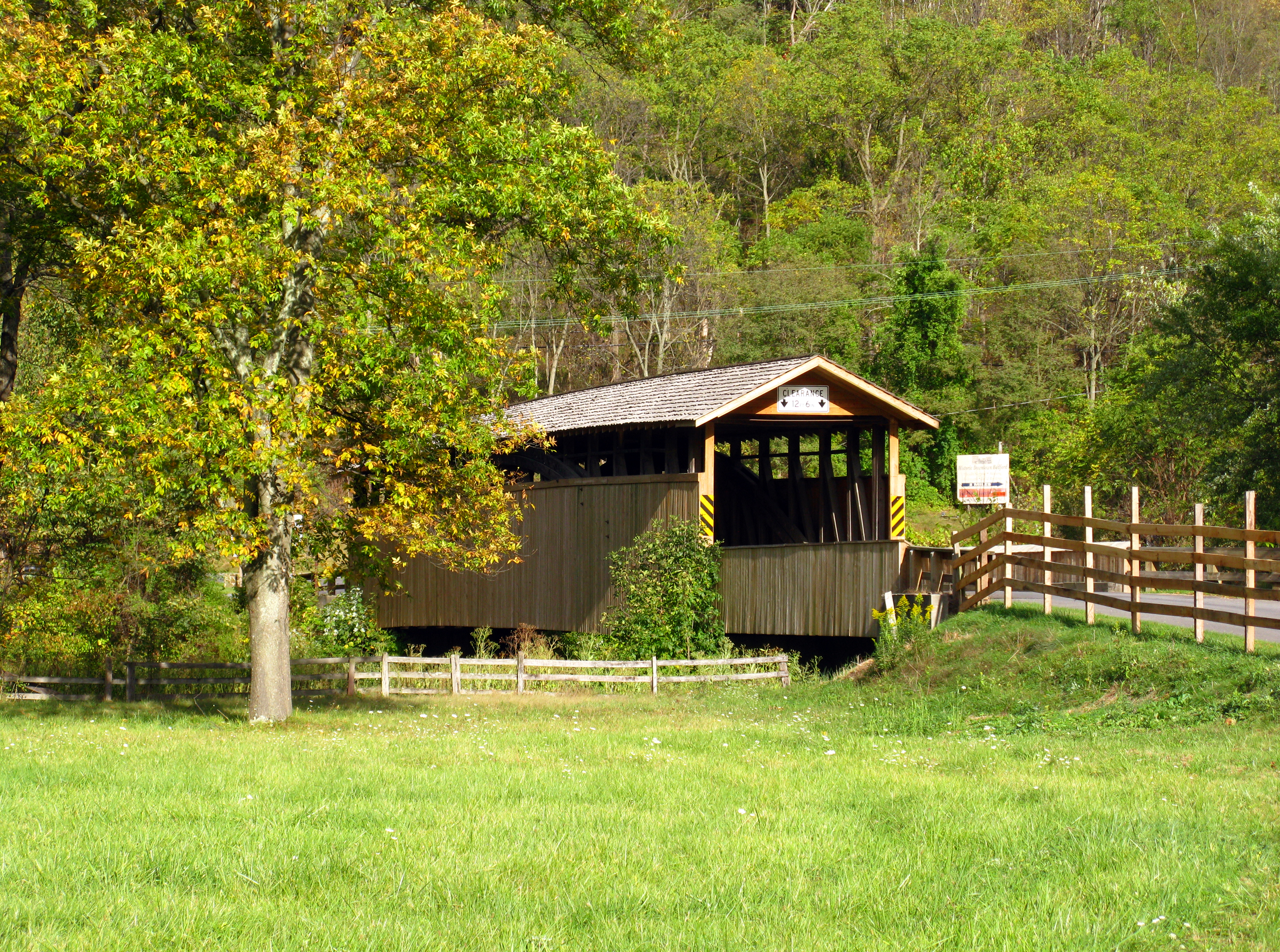
- Old Bedford Village Covered Bridge in Bedford Township

- Flag

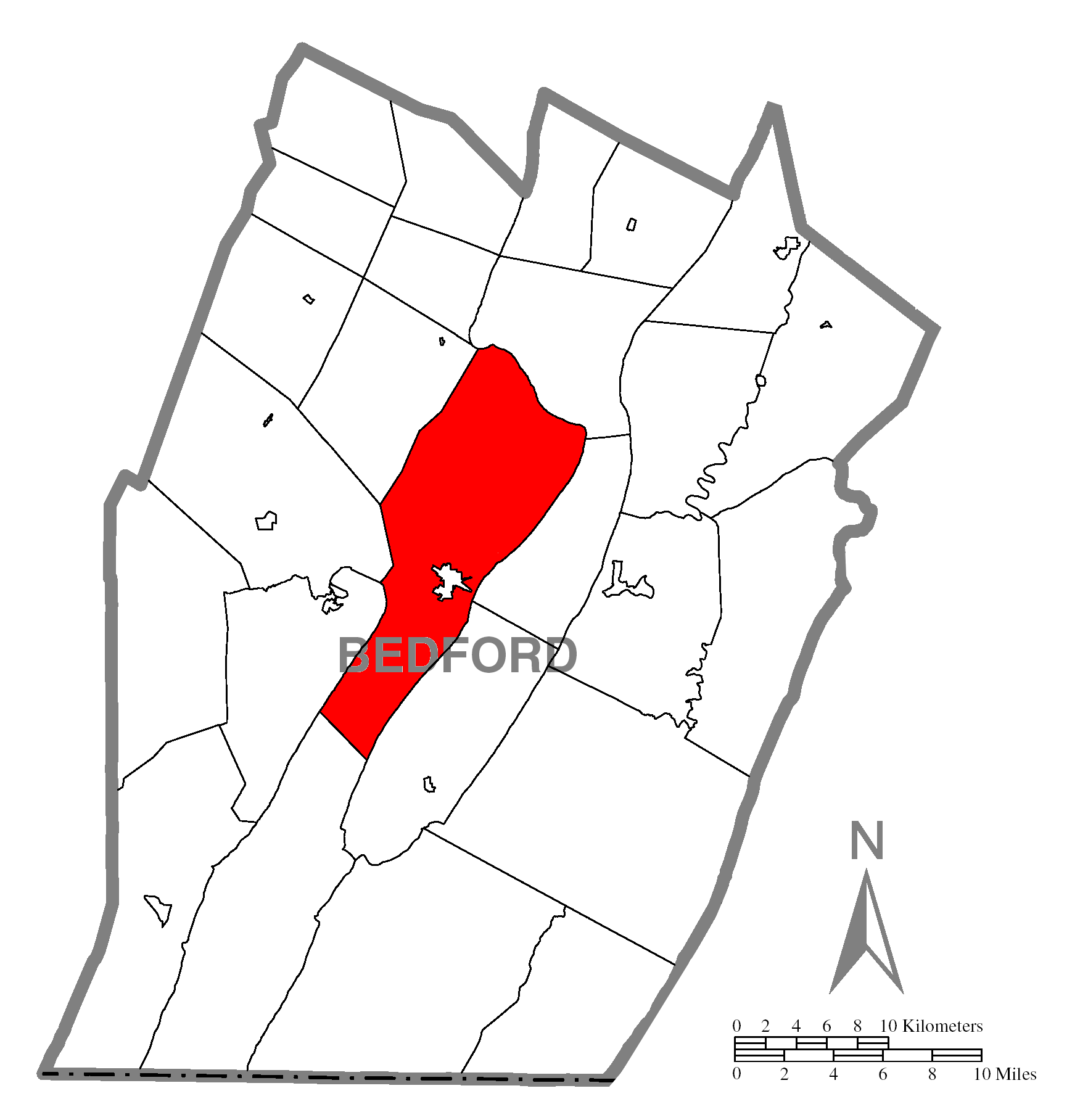
- Map of Bedford County, Pennsylvania highlighting Bedford Township

- Map of Bedford County, Pennsylvania
- Country: United States
- State: Pennsylvania
- County: Bedford
- Settled: 1761
- Incorporated: 1768

Area
  - Total: 68.31 sq mi (176.91 km^{2})
  - Land: 68.07 sq mi (176.31 km^{2})
  - Water: 0.23 sq mi (0.60 km^{2})

Population (2020)
  - Total: 5,103 ▼
  - Estimate (2023): 5,062
  - Density: 76.3/sq mi (29.46/km^{2})
- Time zone: UTC-5 (Eastern (EST))
  - Summer (DST): UTC-4 (EDT)
- Area code: 814
- FIPS code: 42-009-04952
- Website: bedfordtwppagov.com

Bedford Township is a township in Bedford County, Pennsylvania, United States. The population was 5,103 at the 2020 census.

== History ==
The Bedford Village Archeological Site is located in northern Bedford Township, north of the borough of Bedford. The site of a village of the Monongahela tribe, it is currently occupied by Old Bedford Village, a living history museum.

== Geography ==
Bedford Township is located in the center of Bedford County and surrounds the borough of Bedford. According to the United States Census Bureau, the township has a total area of 68.3 square miles (176.9 km^{2}), of which 68.1 square miles (176.3 km^{2}) is land and 0.23 square miles (0.6 km^{2}), or 0.34%, is water.

=== Adjacent municipalities ===
- Harrison Township (southwest)
- Napier Township (west)
- East Saint Clair Township (northwest)
- South Woodbury Township (north)
- Snake Spring Township (east)
- Colerain Township (southeast)
- Cumberland Valley Township (south)
- Borough of Bedford (surrounded)

== Geology ==
Bedford valley is a synclinal valley, with Evitts Mountain forming the eastern limb and Wills Mountain forming a part of the western limb. The northern end of Wills Mountain is known as Kinton Knob and is the crest of a plunging anticline. The Silurian Tuscarora Formation, a hard sandstone, outcrops at the crests of these ridges and is stratigraphically lower and thus older than the rest of the bedrock in the township. The overlying formations are either Silurian or Devonian in age, and include (in ascending order) the Clinton Group, the Bloomsburg Formation, the Mifflintown Formation, the Wills Creek Formation, the Tonoloway Formation, the Keyser Formation, the Old Port Formation, the Onondaga Formation, and the Hamilton Group, which is composed of the Marcellus Shale and the Mahantango Formation. The Ridgeley Member of the Old Port Formation, another sandstone and conglomerate, forms the low ridge in the center of the township south of the town of Bedford, as well as Stiffler Ridge in Dunning Cove. Dunning Cove itself is a structural basin.

== Recreation ==
A portion of the Pennsylvania State Game Lands Number 48 is located in the township.

== Demographics ==
Historical population
Census	Pop.	Note	%±
2000	5,417		—
2010	5,395		−0.4%
2020	5,103		−5.4%
2023 (est.)	5,062		−0.8%
U.S. Decennial Census

As of the census of 2000, there were 5,417 people, 2,144 households, and 1,560 families residing in the township. The population density was 79.0 inhabitants per square mile (30.5/km^{2}). There were 2,403 housing units at an average density of 35.0 per square mile (13.5/km^{2}). The racial makeup of the township was 97.14% White, 1.33% African American, 0.06% Native American, 0.48% Asian, 0.24% from other races, and 0.76% from two or more races. Hispanic or Latino of any race were 0.59% of the population.

There were 2,144 households, out of which 28.6% had children under the age of 18 living with them, 61.8% were married couples living together, 7.3% had a female householder with no husband present, and 27.2% were non-families. 23.7% of all households were made up of individuals, and 11.6% had someone living alone who was 65 years of age or older. The average household size was 2.43 and the average family size was 2.86.

In the township the population was spread out, with 21.3% under the age of 18, 6.3% from 18 to 24, 28.7% from 25 to 44, 23.8% from 45 to 64, and 20.0% who were 65 years of age or older. The median age was 41 years. For every 100 females, there were 98.9 males. For every 100 females age 18 and over, there were 93.9 males.

The median income for a household in the township was $36,395, and the median income for a family was $43,235. Males had a median income of $28,833 versus $21,177 for females. The per capita income for the township was $18,676. About 5.3% of families and 6.5% of the population were below the poverty line, including 6.8% of those under age 18 and 7.4% of those age 65 or over.
