= West Providence Township, Pennsylvania =

Township in Pennsylvania, US

Coordinates: 39°57′10″N 78°23′44″W

- Township
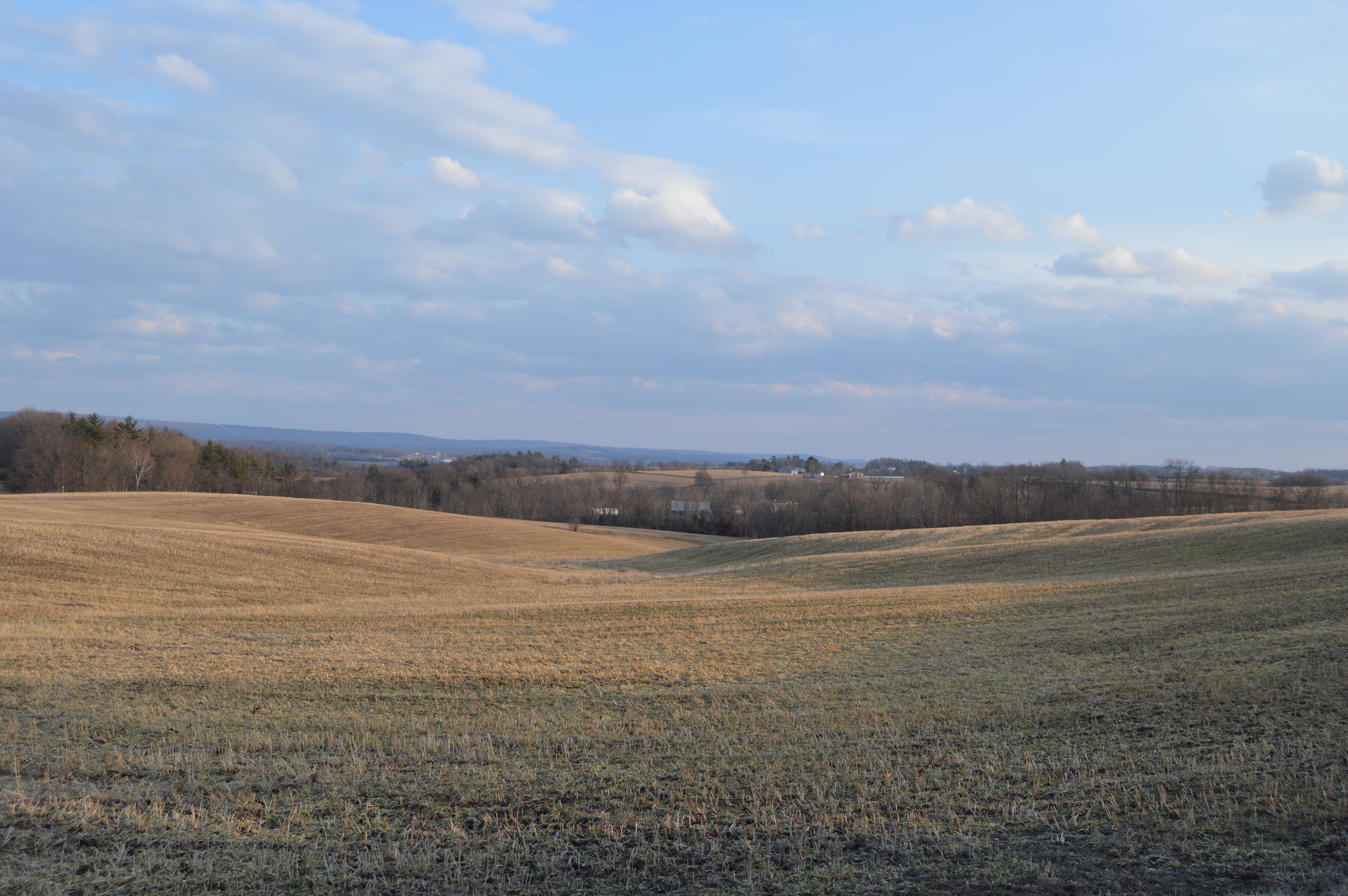
- Farm fields east of Everett

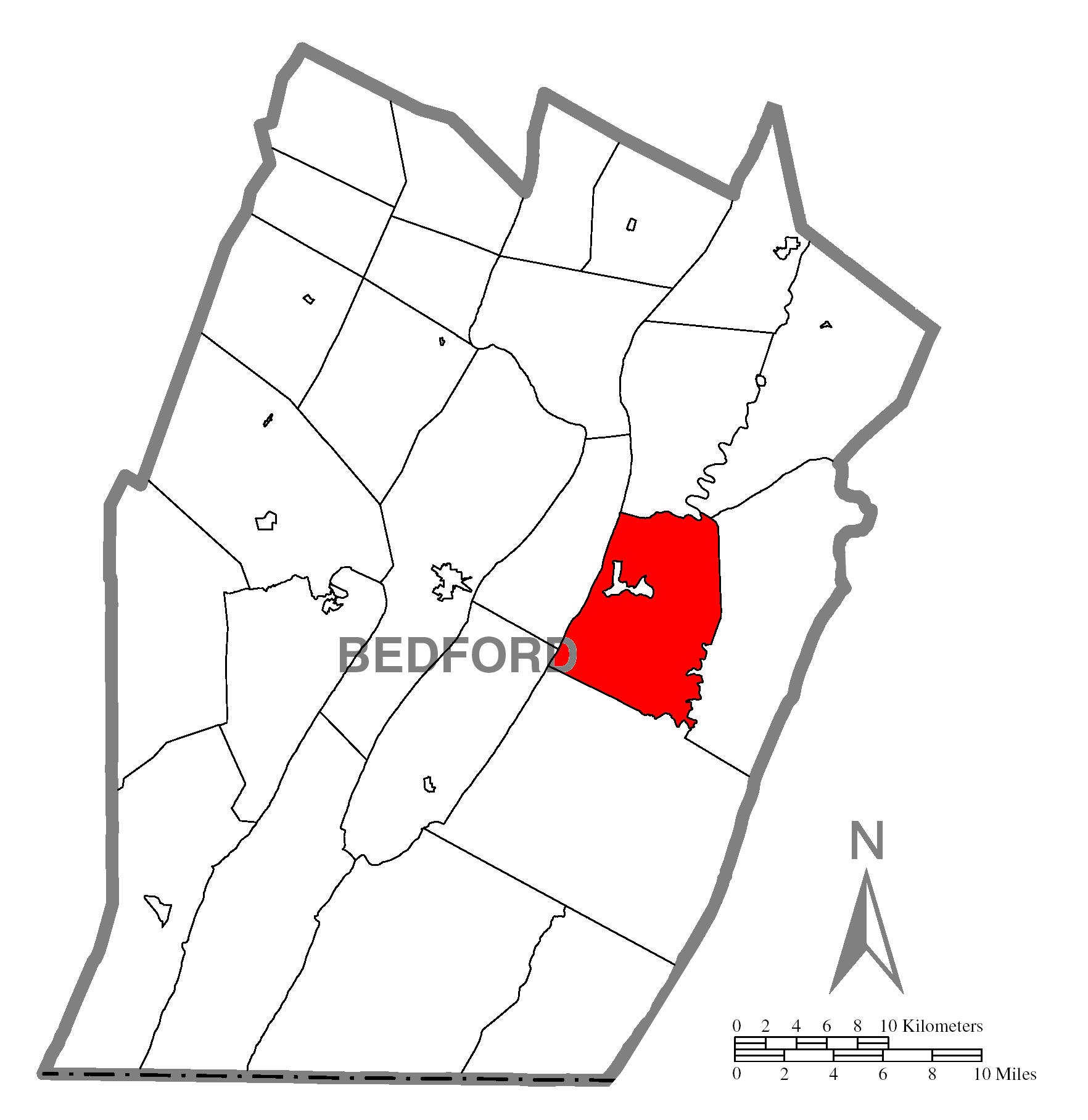
- Map of Bedford County, Pennsylvania highlighting West Providence Township

- Map of Bedford County, Pennsylvania
- Country: United States
- State: Pennsylvania
- County: Bedford
- Settled: 1772
- Incorporated: 1844

Area
  - Total: 39.03 sq mi (101.09 km^{2})
  - Land: 38.53 sq mi (99.80 km^{2})
  - Water: 0.50 sq mi (1.29 km^{2})

Population (2020)
  - Total: 3,078 ▼
  - Estimate (2023): 3,048
  - Density: 80.6/sq mi (31.12/km^{2})
- Time zone: UTC-5 (Eastern (EST))
  - Summer (DST): UTC-4 (EDT)
- Area code: 814
- FIPS code: 42-009-83920
- Website: www.westprovidencetownship.org

West Providence Township is a township in Bedford County, Pennsylvania, United States. The population was 3,078 at the 2020 census.

== Geography ==
West Providence Township is located in eastern Bedford County. It surrounds the borough of Everett but is separate from it. The unincorporated community of Earlston, adjacent to Everett, is part of the township.

According to the United States Census Bureau, the township has a total area of 38.7 square miles (100.3 km^{2}), of which 38.2 square miles (99.0 km^{2}) is land and 0.58 square miles (1.5 km^{2}), or 1.29%, is water. The Raystown Branch of the Juniata River takes a sinuous path from west to east, then north through the township.

== Recreation ==
Portions of Pennsylvania State Game Lands Number 73 and Number 97 are located in the western part of the township.

== Demographics ==
Historical population
Census	Pop.	Note	%±
2010	3,210		—
2020	3,078		−4.1%
2023 (est.)	3,048		−1.0%
U.S. Decennial Census

As of the census of 2000, there were 3,323 people, 1,339 households, and 1,027 families residing in the township. The population density was 86.4 inhabitants per square mile (33.4/km^{2}). There were 1,590 housing units at an average density of 41.3 per square mile (15.9/km^{2}). The racial makeup of the township was 99.01% White, 0.30% African American, 0.03% Native American, 0.09% Asian, 0.06% Pacific Islander, 0.09% from other races, and 0.42% from two or more races. Hispanic or Latino of any race were 0.39% of the population.

There were 1,339 households, out of which 27.9% had children under the age of 18 living with them, 65.5% were married couples living together, 7.5% had a female householder with no husband present, and 23.3% were non-families. 20.2% of all households were made up of individuals, and 10.3% had someone living alone who was 65 years of age or older. The average household size was 2.48 and the average family size was 2.82.

In the township the population was spread out, with 21.2% under the age of 18, 7.1% from 18 to 24, 27.0% from 25 to 44, 26.7% from 45 to 64, and 18.0% who were 65 years of age or older. The median age was 41 years. For every 100 females there were 97.1 males. For every 100 females age 18 and over, there were 94.4 males.

The median income for a household in the township was $32,609, and the median income for a family was $38,475. Males had a median income of $26,964 versus $18,039 for females. The per capita income for the township was $18,564. About 6.0% of families and 7.0% of the population were below the poverty line, including 9.4% of those under age 18 and 1.1% of those age 65 or over.
