= Pennsylvania Route 867 =

State highway in Pennsylvania, US

Pennsylvania Route 867

Route information
- Maintained by PennDOT, Taylor Township, Borough of Roaring Spring
- Length: 12.211 mi (19.652 km)
- Existed: 1928–present

Major junctions
- South end: PA 869 in South Woodbury Township
- PA 868 in Bloomfield Township
- North end: PA 36 / PA 164 near Roaring Spring

Location
- Country: United States
- State: Pennsylvania
- Counties: Bedford, Blair

Highway system
- Pennsylvania State Route System; Interstate; US; State; Scenic; Legislative
← PA 866	→ PA 868

Pennsylvania Route 867 (PA 867) is a 12-mile-long (19 km) state highway located in Bedford and Blair counties in Pennsylvania. The southern terminus is at PA 869 in South Woodbury Township. The northern terminus is at PA 36/PA 164 outside of Roaring Spring.

== Route description ==
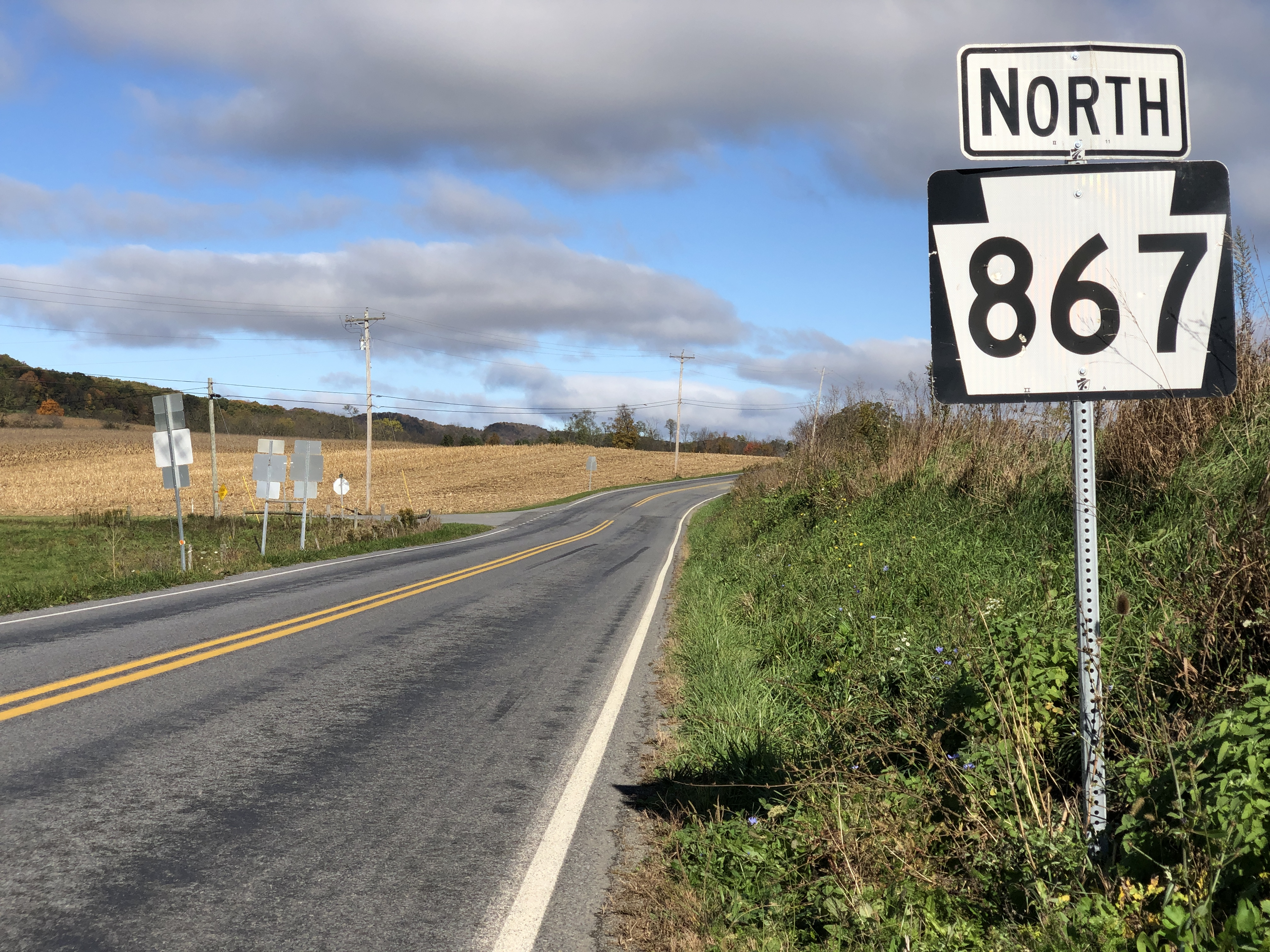
PA 867 northbound past PA 868 in Bloomfield Township

PA 867 begins at an intersection with PA 869 in the community of Brumbaugh in South Woodbury Township, Bedford County, heading northeast on two-lane undivided Lafayette Road. The road heads between forested Dunning Mountain to the west and farms to the east. The route passes through more agricultural areas in a valley with occasional homes, passing through Lafayetteville before crossing into Bloomfield Township. In this area, PA 867 runs through more rural surroundings, coming to an intersection with the northern terminus of PA 868. Past this intersection, the road continues north through more farmland with some woods and residences, heading through Bakers Summit.

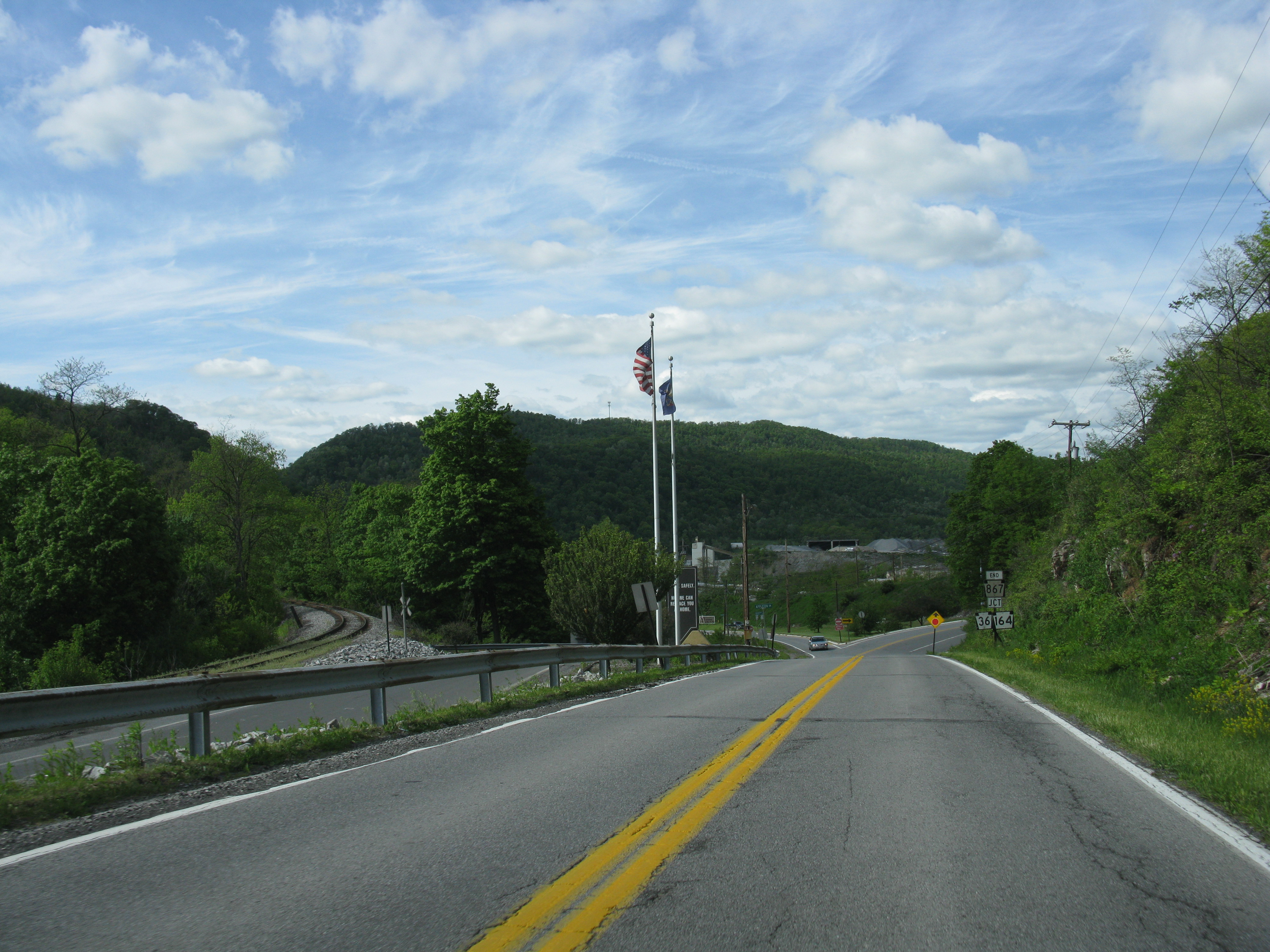
PA 867 approaching its northern terminus at PA 36/PA 164

PA 867 enters Taylor Township in Blair County and runs north-northeast through agricultural areas with woods and homes, becoming Bloomfield Road. Though the road was maintained by the Pennsylvania Department of Transportation (PennDOT) in Bedford County, maintenance on PA 867 in Taylor Township and Roaring Spring is performed by the respective municipality in Blair County. The road continues through rural areas before heading into the borough of Roaring Spring and becoming Bloomfield Street, heading north past homes. The route turns north onto Main Street and crosses the Hollidaysburg and Roaring Spring Railroad, heading into residential and commercial areas. At the intersection with Spang Street, PA 867 becomes a one-way pair with the southbound direction continuing along one-way Main Street and the northbound direction heading northeast on two-way Spang Street before heading northwest on one-way East Main Street. The two directions of the route merge back together and continue north on Main Street between industrial areas to the west and homes to the east. PA 864 crosses back into Taylor Township and heads through wooded areas, ending at an intersection with PA 36/PA 164.

== Major intersections ==
County	Location	mi	km	Destinations	Notes
Bedford	South Woodbury Township	0.000	0.000	PA 869 (Brumbaugh Road) – New Enterprise, Osterburg	Southern terminus
Bedford	Bloomfield Township	5.555	8.940	PA 868 south (Potter Creek Road) – Loysburg	Northern terminus of PA 868
Blair	Taylor Township	12.211	19.652	PA 36 / PA 164 (Woodbury Pike) – Hollidaysburg, Martinsburg	Northern terminus
1.000 mi = 1.609 km; 1.000 km = 0.621 mi

== PA 867 Truck ==
Pennsylvania Route 867 Truck
- Location: Blair County
- Existed: 2013–2022

Pennsylvania Route 867 Truck was a truck route of PA 867 following PA 869, Interstate 99, and PA 36/164, forming a loop at the ends of the main route. It provided access to Sproul Mountain Road, which had a weight-restricted bridge over a tributary of Halter Creek on which trucks on which trucks and combination loads over 36 tons were prohibited, to which PA 867 was the quickest access. It was signed in 2013. The bridge was reconstructed in 2020, and signs were removed in 2022.
