= Lost Turkey Trail =

Hiking trail

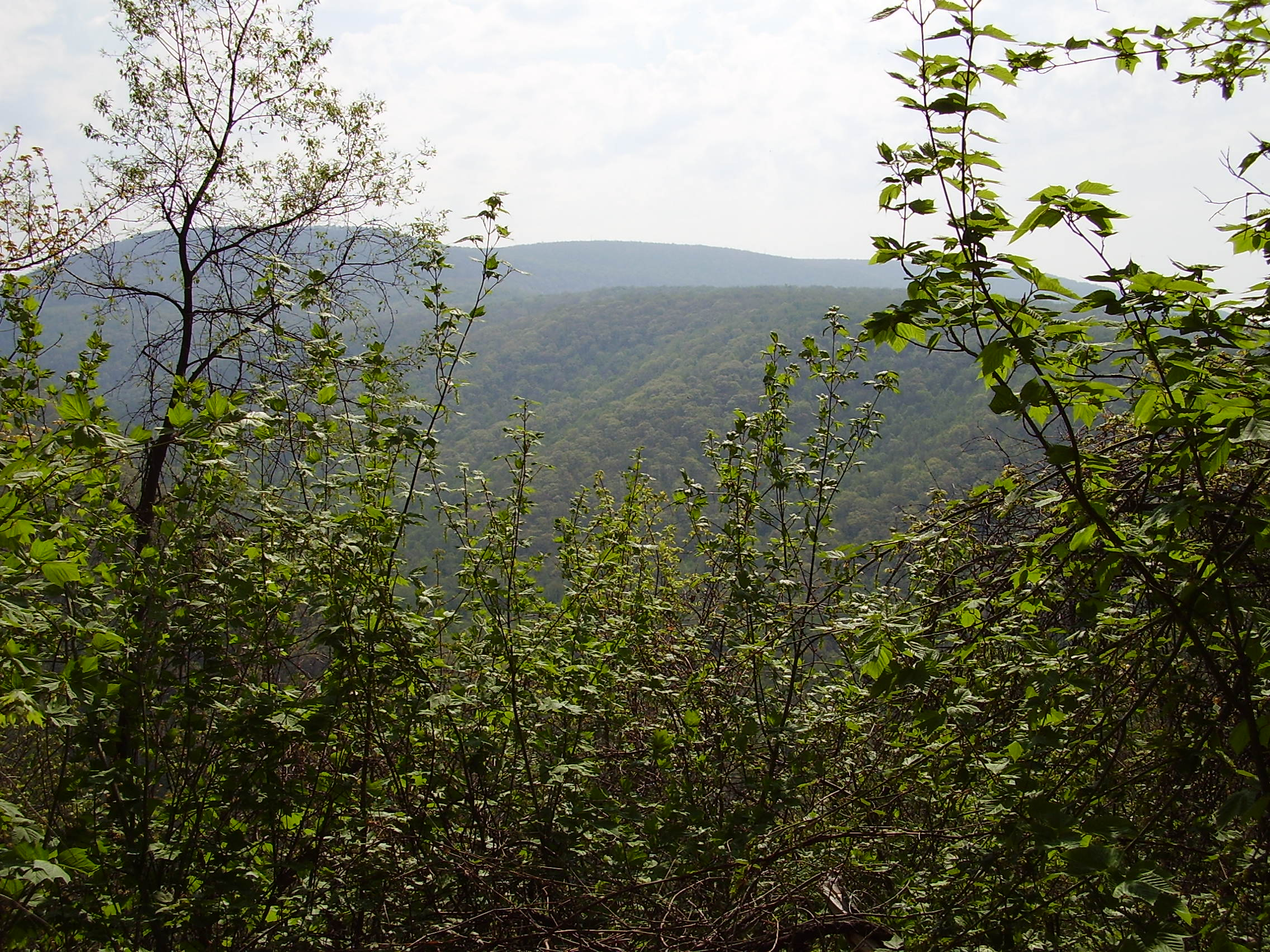
- A view of Blue Knob, from a ridgetop on the Lost Turkey Trail.
- Length: 26.3 mi (42.3 km)
- Location: Bedford County, Cambria County, and Somerset County, Pennsylvania, US
- Trailheads: Blue Knob State Park, Pennsylvania Route 56
- Use: Hiking
- Elevation change: High
- Difficulty: Strenuous
- Season: Year-round
- Hazards: Uneven and wet terrain, rattlesnakes, mosquitoes, ticks, black bears

The Lost Turkey Trail is a 26.3-mile (42.3 km) hiking trail in southwestern Pennsylvania, United States. The trail traverses portions of Blue Knob State Park, a state game land, some parcels of private land, and Gallitzin State Forest. The trail is mostly in Bedford County and Somerset County, with a few segments briefly crossing the border into Cambria County. It reaches the highest point of any backpacking trail in Pennsylvania, with its eastern terminus at 3,034 feet, at Herman Point near the top of Blue Knob, which in turn is the second highest peak in the state. The trail also features a significant climb up the Allegheny Front. These rugged geographic features, combined with a shortage of camping areas and extensive no-camping zones, make the Lost Turkey Trail one of the more challenging backpacking trails in Pennsylvania.

== History and route ==
The Lost Turkey Trail was built by the Youth Conservation Corps in the mid-1970s, and its name is believed to derive from an inside joke among the volunteer trail builders. Here the trail is described in the westbound direction, starting at Blue Knob State Park. From a small parking lot at Herman Point, near the top of Blue Knob, the trail immediately begins a lengthy and steep descent off the mountain and toward the valley of Bobs Creek. At about six-tenths of a mile, the trail passes the Lost Cox Children Monument, where the bodies of two young children were found in 1856. The trail crosses Bobs Creek, follows its valley downstream for a while, then climbs up an intervening ridge. After briefly walking along the top of the ridge, the trail descends steeply again, then crosses Wallace Branch and Pennsylvania Route 869 at Burnt House Picnic Area.

Continuing to the west, the Lost Turkey Trail begins a significant climb up the Allegheny Front, though the climb is gradual, following stream hollows and rising about 1,000 feet over three miles. At the top of the plateau, the terrain levels off and the western half of the trail is relatively easy. In this section, the trail encounters the source of the South Fork of the Little Conemaugh River; downstream, this waterway was responsible for the devastating Johnstown Flood of 1889. Near its western end, the trail enters Gallitzin State Forest, and ends at a parking lot on Pennsylvania Route 56 east of Windber. That parking lot is just across the highway from Babcock Picnic Area, which serves as the trailhead for the John P. Saylor Trail.
