= Pennsylvania Route 869 =

State highway in Pennsylvania, US

Pennsylvania Route 869

Route information
- Maintained by PennDOT
- Length: 32.776 mi (52.748 km)

Major junctions
- West end: US 219 in St. Michael
- PA 160 in Sidman; PA 96 in Weyant; I-99 / US 220 in St. Clairsville; PA 867 near New Enterprise
- East end: PA 36 in South Woodbury Township

Location
- Country: United States
- State: Pennsylvania
- Counties: Cambria, Bedford

Highway system
- Pennsylvania State Route System; Interstate; US; State; Scenic; Legislative
← PA 868	→ PA 871

Pennsylvania Route 869 (PA 869) is an east–west state route located in Western Pennsylvania. Its western terminus is at Ragers Hill Road just west of U.S. Route 219 (US 219) in St. Michael, Adams Township, and its eastern terminus is at PA 36 in South Woodbury Township.

== Route description ==
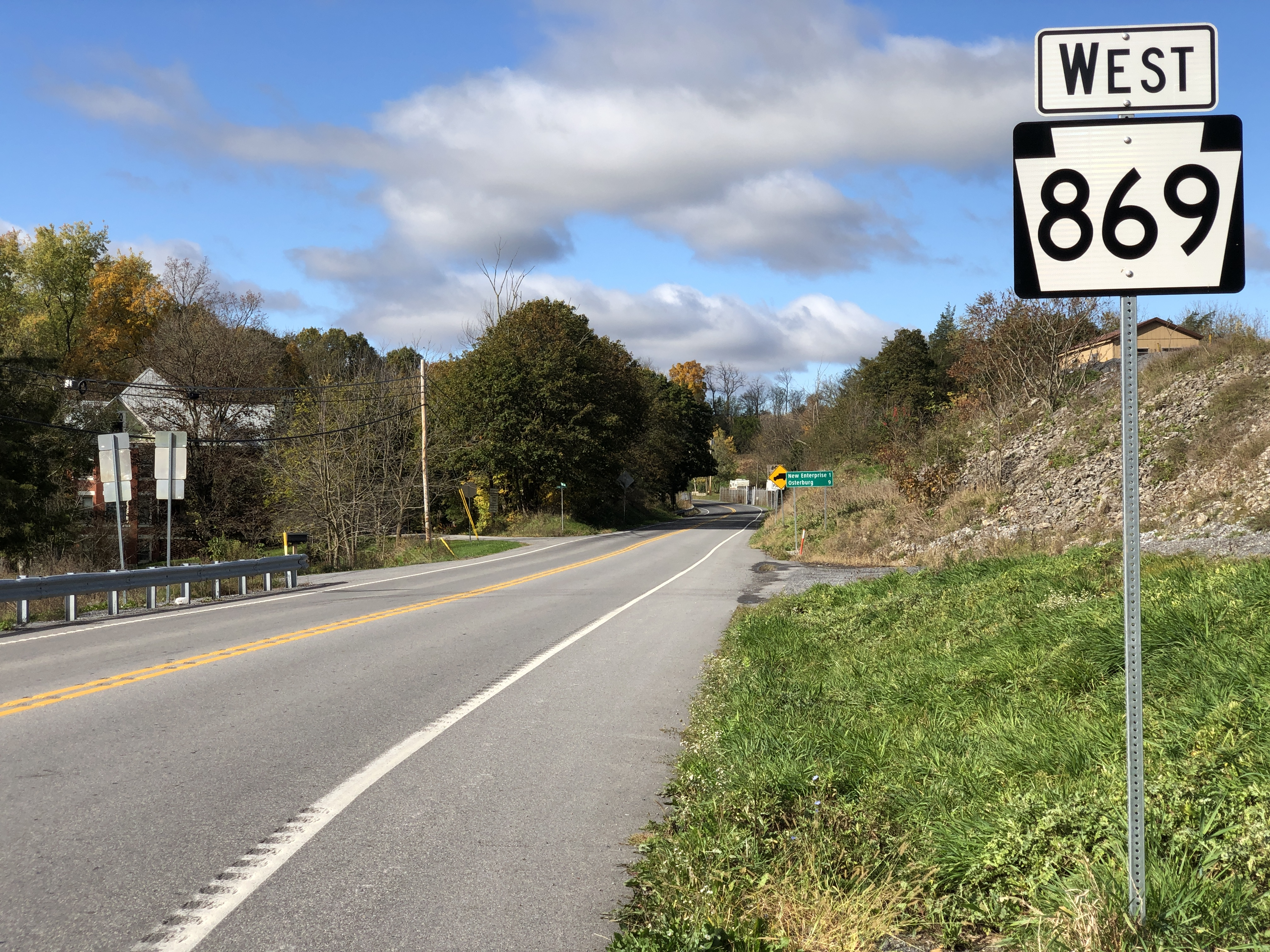
PA 869 westbound past PA 36 in South Woodbury Township

PA 869 begins at an interchange with the US 219 freeway in Adams Township, Cambria County, heading southeast on a four-lane divided highway. The route soon becomes two-lane undivided Locust Street as it passes by the Johnstown Flood National Memorial before running through the community of St. Michael, where it passes homes with some businesses. The road heads east and comes to an intersection with PA 160. At this point, PA 160 turns east to form a concurrency with PA 869, crossing Norfolk Southern's South Fork Secondary railroad line prior to crossing the South Fork Little Conemaugh River into Croyle Township. Here, the road becomes Mill Road passes through Lovett. PA 869 splits from PA 160 by heading southeast onto Beaver Run Avenue, entering forested areas. The road passes through Allendale and crosses Beaverdam Run, heading back into Adams Township. The route heads east before curving northeast through forests with a few homes, entering Summerhill Township. Here, PA 869 heads east and reaches the residential community of Beaverdale. The route turns southwest onto Cedar Street, passing businesses, before turning southeast onto Cameron Avenue, running past more homes and continuing into the community of Lloydell. In this area, PA 869 turns northeast onto Oak Street, curving southeast before turning east for a brief distance and southeast onto Shawnee Road. The road winds through forested areas, turning east and passing to the south of Beaverdam Reservoir. Past this, the route heads to the southeast again.

PA 869 enters Pavia Township in Bedford County and becomes Burnt House Road, running through more forests with occasional clearings. The road turns to the south and heads into Blue Knob State Park, curving to the east. After another turn to the south, the route leaves the state park and passes through the residential community of Pavia before heading through more wooded areas with some farms and homes. PA 869 heads into Lincoln Township and runs through more rural areas, running to the west of Bobs Creek. Farther south, the route turns east onto Miller Road, with PA 96 continuing south on King St. Clair Road. At this point, PA 869 heads into King Township and crosses Bobs Creek, turning south onto Heritage Road. The road heads through agricultural areas with some residences and patches of woods. The route turns southeast and heads into East St. Clair Township, passing through more rural areas as it skirts the border between East St. Clair Township and King Township. PA 869 heads into the residential community of Osterburg and turns northeast onto Central Street, fully entering King Township. The route turns southeast onto Oster Street and passes through more of the community.

Upon leaving Osterburg, PA 869 turns south onto Lumber Street, crossing back into East St. Clair Township and passing through farmland with some woods and development. The road passes to the west of the borough of St. Clairsville and heads into more forested areas. The route turns east and comes to an interchange with I-99/US 220 before turning to the northeast onto Mountain Road and running parallel to I-99/US 220 through wooded areas. PA 869 crosses back into King Township and turns northeast to ascend forested Dunning Mountain. At the summit of the mountain, the road becomes Brumbaugh Road and heads into South Woodbury Township, descending the mountain and turning south and then east. At the base of Dunning Mountain, the route intersects the southern terminus of PA 867 in Brumbaugh and turns southeast, heading through a mix of farmland and woodland. PA 869 turns east and continues through open agricultural areas with occasional homes. The route runs through the residential community of New Enterprise before running through more farmland with some trees and homes, ending at an intersection with PA 36.

== Major intersections ==
County	Location	mi	km	Destinations	Notes
Cambria	Adams Township	0.000– 0.137	0.000– 0.220	US 219 / Locust Street – Ebensburg, Johnstown, South Fork, Johnstown Regional Airport	Interchange; western terminus
Cambria	Adams Township	2.187	3.520	PA 160 south (Forest Hills Drive) – Windber	Western terminus of PA 160 concurrency
Cambria	Croyle Township	2.409	3.877	PA 160 north (Mill Road) – Ebensburg	Eastern terminus of PA 160 concurrency
Bedford	Lincoln Township	18.038	29.029	PA 96 south (King St. Clair Road) / Miller Road – Pleasantville	Northern terminus of PA 96
Bedford	East St. Clair Township	23.976– 24.085	38.586– 38.761	I-99 / US 220 – Bedford, Altoona	Exit 7 (I-99/US 220)
Bedford	South Woodbury Township	27.623	44.455	PA 867 north (Lafayette Road) – Roaring Spring	Southern terminus of PA 867
Bedford	South Woodbury Township	32.776	52.748	PA 36 (Woodbury Pike) – Everett, Roaring Spring	Eastern terminus
1.000 mi = 1.609 km; 1.000 km = 0.621 mi: Concurrency terminus
