= Pennsylvania Route 868 =

State highway in Bedford County, Pennsylvania, US

Pennsylvania Route 868

Route information
- Maintained by PennDOT
- Length: 5.23 mi (8.42 km)
- Existed: 1928–present

Major junctions
- South end: PA 36 in South Woodbury Township
- North end: PA 867 in Bloomfield Township

Location
- Country: United States
- State: Pennsylvania
- Counties: Bedford

Highway system
- Pennsylvania State Route System; Interstate; US; State; Scenic; Legislative
| ← PA 867 | → PA 869 |

Pennsylvania Route 868 (PA 868) is a 5.23-mile-long (8.42 km) state highway located in Bedford County in Pennsylvania. The southern terminus is at PA 36 in South Woodbury Township. The northern terminus is at PA 867 in Bloomfield Township.

== Route description ==
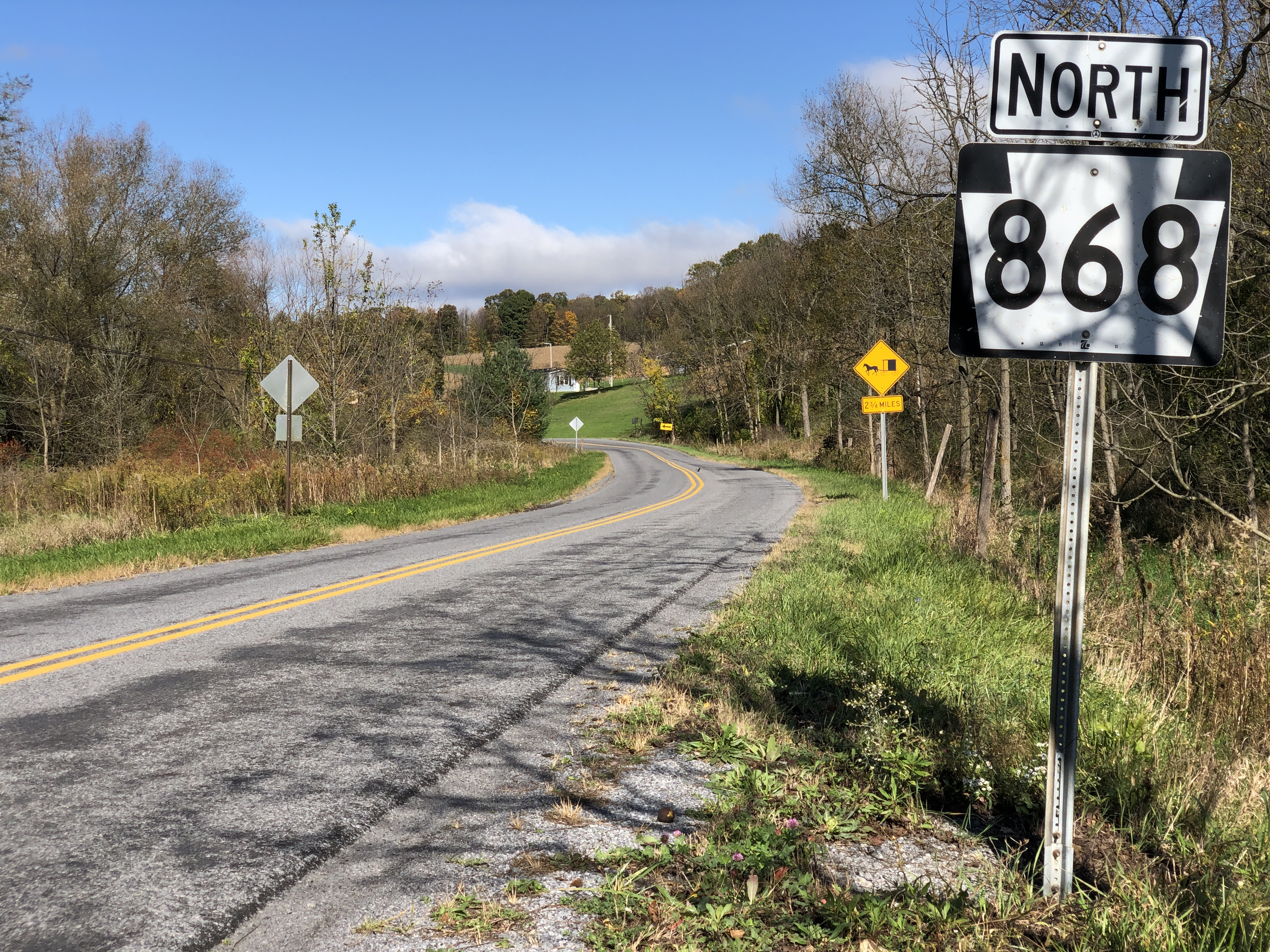
PA 868 northbound in Bloomfield Township

PA 868 begins at an intersection with PA 36 in the community of Waterside in South Woodbury Township, heading northwest on two-lane undivided Potter Creek Road. The road heads through an agricultural valley with some woods and residences, passing through a corner of Woodbury Township before entering Bloomfield Township. The route passes through the community of Maria prior to continuing through more forested areas with some farm fields and homes. PA 868 curves to the north through open farmland and comes to its northern terminus at PA 867.

== Major intersections ==
The entire route is in Bedford County.

| Location | mi | km | Destinations | Notes |
|---|---|---|---|---|
| South Woodbury Township | 0.00 | 0.00 | PA 36 (Woodbury Pike) | Southern terminus |
| Bloomfield Township | 5.23 | 8.42 | PA 867 (Lafayette Road) – Osterburg, Roaring Spring | Northern terminus |
1.000 mi = 1.609 km; 1.000 km = 0.621 mi
