= St. Clairsville =

St. Clairsville may refer to:

- St. Clairsville, Ohio
- St. Clairsville, Pennsylvania
