= Osterburg, Pennsylvania =

Unincorporated community in Pennsylvania, US

- Unincorporated community
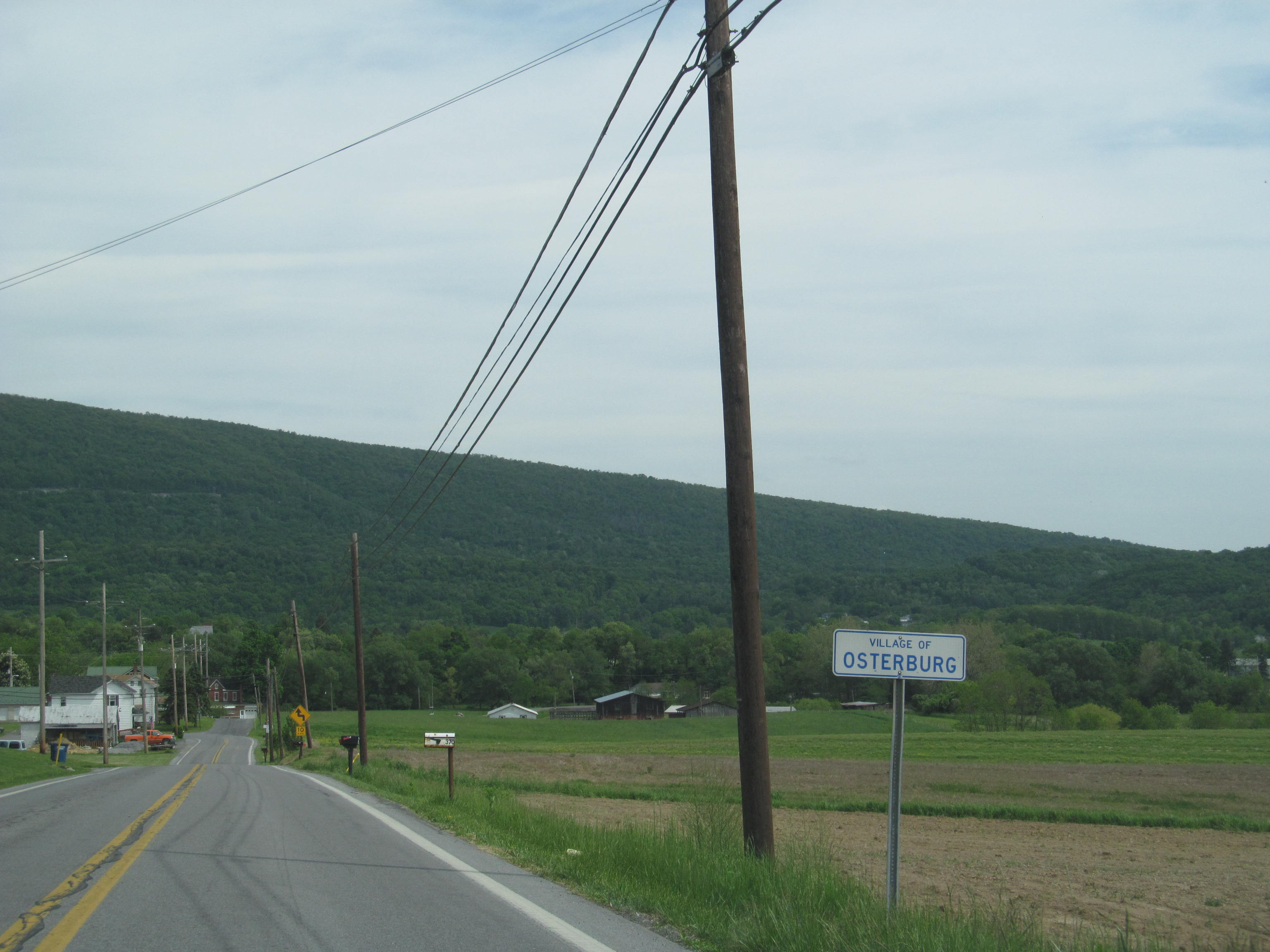
- Entering Osterburg from the west on PA 869

- Location within the U.S. state of Pennsylvania Osterburg (the United States)
- Coordinates: 40°10′10″N 78°31′13″W
- Country: United States
- State: Pennsylvania
- County: Bedford
- Townships: King, East St. Clair
- Time zone: UTC-5 (Eastern (EST))
  - Summer (DST): UTC-4 (EDT)
- ZIP codes: 16667

Osterburg is a small unincorporated community in Bedford County, Pennsylvania, United States, between Bedford, Claysburg, and Imler. The ZIP Code for Osterburg is 16667. It is part of the Chestnut Ridge School District.

== Economy ==
Logging and dairy farming are leading parts of the economy of the Osterburg area. Local businesses include Osterburg Post Office, First Commonwealth Bank, and a Dollar General as well as Peights Windows.

== Education ==
=== Public schools ===
Osterburg is served by the Chestnut Ridge School District which operates two elementary schools, one middle school, and one high school.

=== Higher and post-secondary education ===
- Allegany College of Maryland- Bedford Campus

== Recreation ==
Although small, there are many recreational activities in the Osterburg area. Bobs Creek is 13.1 miles (21.1 km) long and has been determined by American Whitewater to be a class I-III section for rafting and kayaking. Blue Knob State Park is also nearby and provides swimming, camping, hunting, fishing, hiking, snowmobiling, cross country skiing and downhill skiing.

== Transportation ==
Osterburg is a half mile from access to I-99 and US 220, with easy access to Altoona, Bellefonte, Bedford, and the Pennsylvania Turnpike.
