= Bloomfield Township, Pennsylvania =

Bloomfield Township is the name of some places in the U.S. state of Pennsylvania:

- Bloomfield Township, Bedford County, Pennsylvania
- Bloomfield Township, Crawford County, Pennsylvania
