= Warrior Formation =

Geologic formation in Pennsylvania, United States

- Stratigraphic range: Cambrian
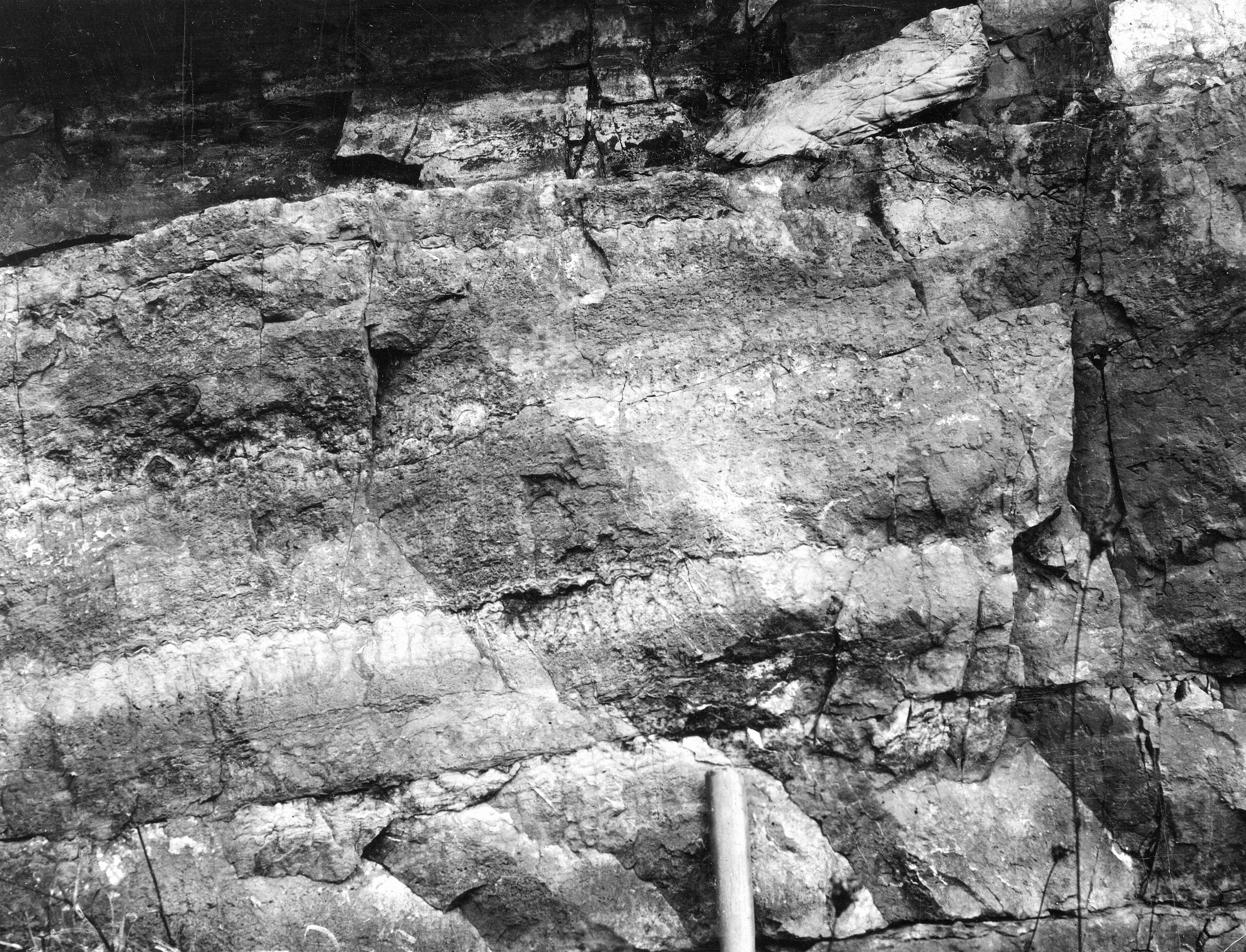
- Outcrop showing cryptozoa layers at Bakers Summit, Bedford County
- Type: sedimentary
- Underlies: Gatesburg Formation
- Overlies: Pleasant Hill Formation
- Thickness: 250 ft at type sections, 1350 ft in Nittany Arch, 746 ft at Waddle.

Lithology
- Primary: limestone
- Other: shale, siltstone, sandstone

Location
- Region: Appalachian Basin
- Country: United States
- Extent: Bedford Co., Blair Co., Centre Co., Huntingdon Co.

Type section
- Named for: Warrior Run, Blair County
- Named by: C. Butts, 1918

The Cambrian Warrior Formation is a mapped limestone bedrock unit in Pennsylvania.

== Description ==
The Warrior Formation is described by Berg and others as gray, thin- to medium-bedded, fossiliferous, cyclic limestone bearing stromatolites, interbedded with shale, siltstone, and sandstone.

=== Fossils ===
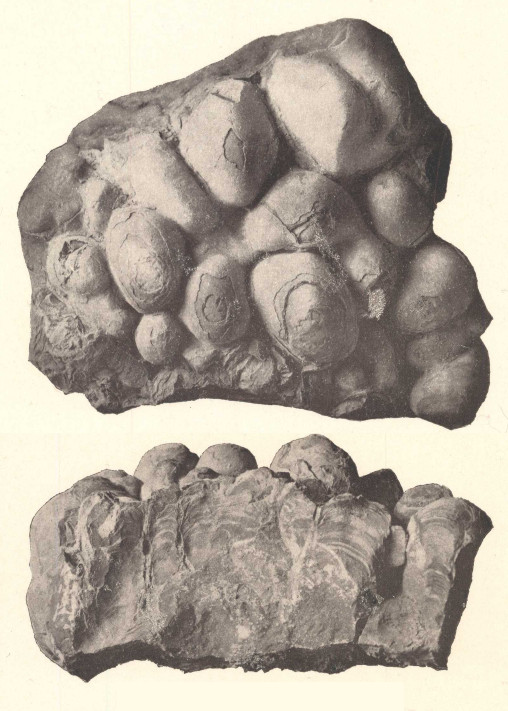
Cryptozoon undulatum from Bakers Summit

- Trilobites, including Crepicephalus, Cedaria, Llanoaspidella, and Blountia kindlei Resser, Coosella brevis Resser, Kingstonia ara (Walcott), K. kindlei Resser, and other Kingstonia species, Menomonia avitas (Walcott), Blountia, Modocia, Lonchocephalus, Genevievella, Pemphigaspis.
- Brachiopods
- Cryptozoon, a type of trace fossil
- Stromatolites

=== Notable Exposures ===
- Type section: Warrior Creek (formerly Warriorsmark Creek),Huntingdon County
- Section near Waddle, Pennsylvania.

== Age ==
Relative age dating places the Warrior Formation in the middle to late Cambrian.
