= Chestnut Ridge Senior High School =

Coordinates: 40.14204°N 78.58233°W

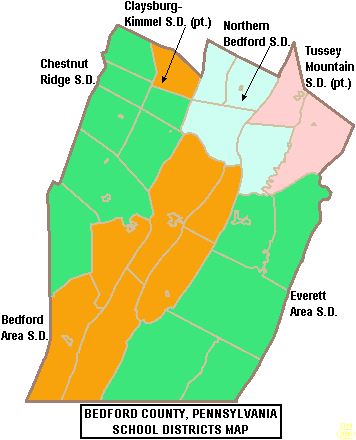

Location
- 2588 Quaker Valley Road; New Paris, Bedford County, Pennsylvania 15554; United States

Information
- Funding type: Public
- School district: Chestnut Ridge School District
- NCES District ID: 4205880
- NCES School ID: 420588000732
- Principal: Eric J Zeznanski
- Faculty: 33
- Grades: 8-12 (2015)
- Enrollment: 639 pupils grades 8th-12th (2015)
- Language: English
- Colors: Blue and Gold
- Team name: Lions
- Communities served: New Paris, Pleasantville, Saint Clairsville, Schellsburg
- Feeder schools: Chestnut Ridge Middle School
- Website: Chestnut Ridge Senior High School

Chestnut Ridge Senior High School is a small, rural public, comprehensive high school located in the Chestnut Ridge region of Bedford County, Pennsylvania. In 2015, enrollment was 639 pupils in grades 8th through 12th. Chestnut Ridge Senior High School is the only high school in the Chestnut Ridge School District.

The school campus was constructed in 1972 and last renovated in 2007, adding a new Cafeteria, Science and Technology Wing, and a Band Room addition, as well as renovations to the existing structure.

== Extracurriculars ==
Chestnut Ridge School District offers a wide variety of clubs, activities and an extensive sports program.

=== Clubs and activities ===
Clubs meet every other school-day as per the six-day cycle system.

- Bible Club
- Envirothon
- Future Farmers of America (FFA)
- Future Business Leaders of America (FBLA)
- Forensics
- Junior Executive Committee
- Key Club
- Lion Buddy Mentoring
- Math Counts
- Model United Nations
- National Honor Society
- Newspaper
- Students Against Destructive Decisions (SADD)
- Scholastic Quiz
- Ski Club
- Senior Executive Committee
- Senior Production
- Service Learning Club
- Student Council
- Teens Against Tobacco Use (TATU)
- Yearbook

=== Athletics ===
Varsity

Boys

- Baseball - AA
- Basketball- AA
- Cross country - AA
- Football - AA
- Golf - AA
- Rifle - AAAA
- Soccer - AA
- Track and field - AA
- Wrestling - AA

Girls

- Basketball - AA
- Cheer - AAAA
- Cross country - A
- Golf - AA
- Rifle - AAAA
- Soccer (fall) - A
- Softball - AAA
- Tennis - AA
- Track and field - AA
- Volleyball - AA
