= Osterburg Covered Bridge =

- U.S. National Register of Historic Places
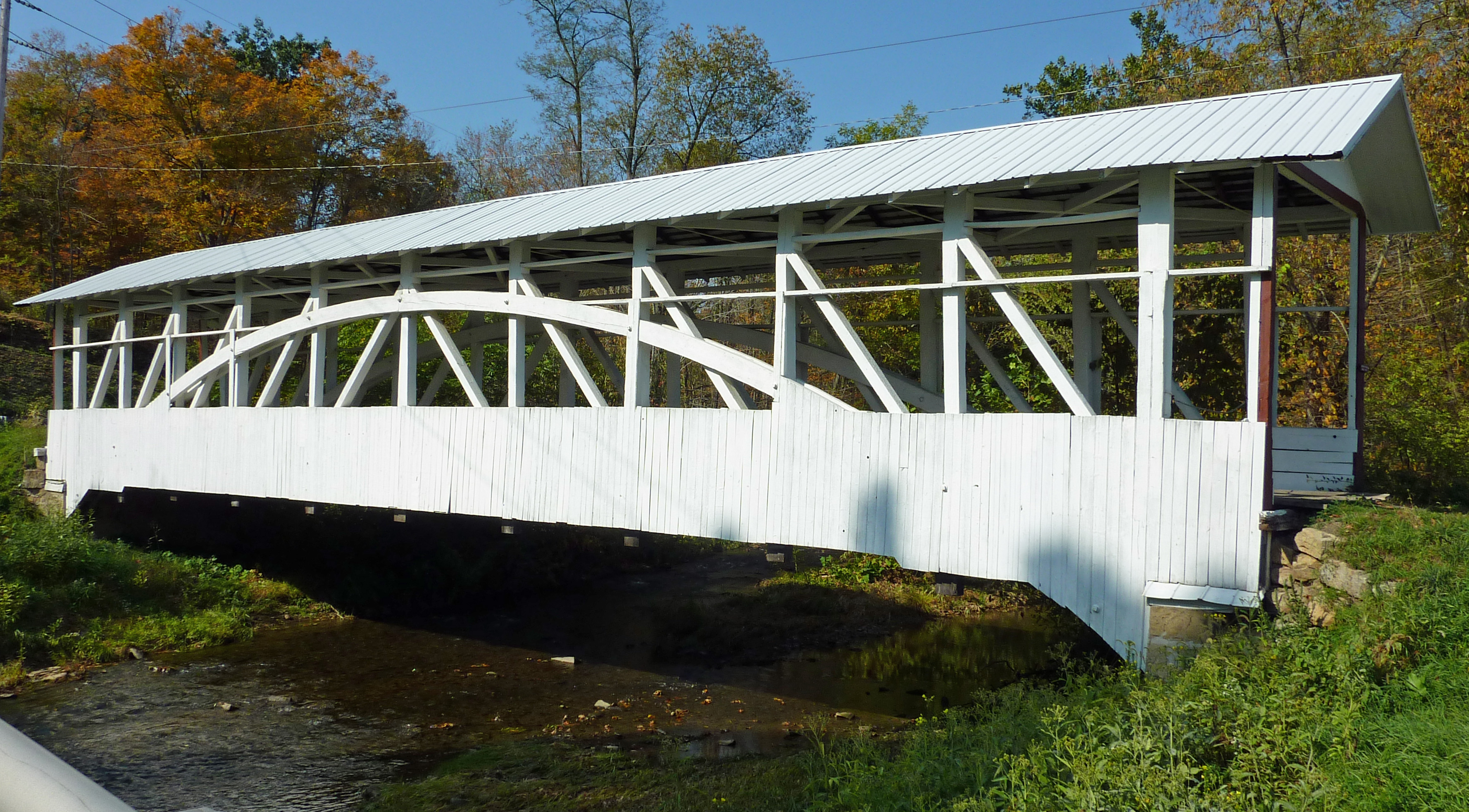
- The bridge in October 2010

- Location within Pennsylvania Location within the United States
- Location: West of Osterburg on Township 757, East St. Clair Township, Pennsylvania
- Coordinates: 40°10′37″N 78°32′30″W
- Area: less than one acre
- MPS: Bedford County Covered Bridges TR
- NRHP reference No.: 80003421
- Added to NRHP: April 10, 1980

The Osterburg Covered Bridge, also known as Bowser's Covered Bridge, is a wooden covered bridge at East St. Clair Township in Bedford County, Pennsylvania. It is a 90-foot-long (27 m), Burr Truss bridge with a shallow gable roof. It crosses Bobs Creek. It is one of 15 historic covered bridges in Bedford County.

It was listed on the National Register of Historic Places in 1980.
