= John P. Saylor Trail =

Hiking trail system in Pennsylvania

Coordinates: 40°12′58″N 78°45′10″W

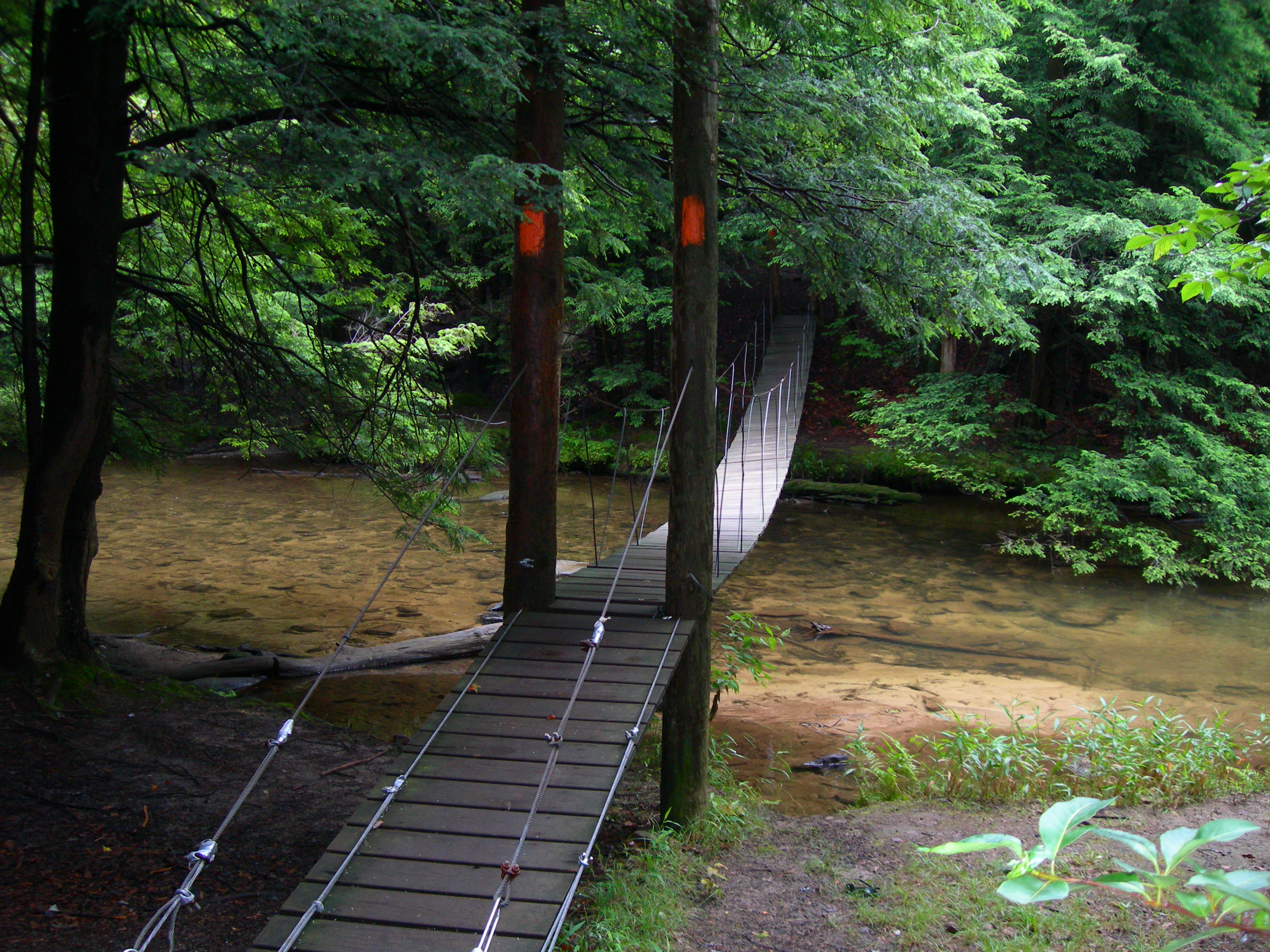
- Suspension bridge over Clear Shade Creek, between the two loops of the John P. Saylor Trail.
- Length: 17.5 mi (28.2 km)
- Location: Somerset County, Pennsylvania, US
- Trailheads: Pennsylvania Route 56
- Use: Hiking
- Elevation change: Low
- Highest point: 2,580 ft (790 m)
- Lowest point: 2,180 ft (660 m)
- Difficulty: Easy
- Season: Year round
- Hazards: Severe weather, poison ivy, ticks

The John P. Saylor Trail is a 17.5-mile (28.2 km) hiking trail system in southwestern Pennsylvania, consisting of two loops with a short cross-connector trail, through Gallitzin State Forest in Somerset County. The trail is named after Congressman John P. Saylor, who sponsored the National Scenic Trails Act while supporting national wilderness preservation. The main loop, which can be reached from the trailhead, is 12.0 miles around. The south loop, which cannot be reached directly by car, can be combined with the main loop and the short cross-connector, for a "figure-8" hike of 17.5 miles.

== Route ==
=== Main loop ===
The main trailhead for the John P. Saylor Trail is found at the parking lot for Babcock Picnic Area off of Pennsylvania Route 56, in the northeastern corner of Somerset County and to the east of Windber. The picnic area is across the highway from another parking lot that serves as the terminus of the Lost Turkey Trail.

Proceeding clockwise, the main loop of the John P. Saylor heads to the east and follows old railroad grades and abandoned forestry roads across a flat area on top of the Allegheny Plateau. At 2.0 miles, the trail crosses Shade Road then begins a mild descent toward Clear Shade Creek, trending to the south. The trail reaches that creek at 3.5 miles and continues through the creek's wide valley for the next few miles, trending to the southwest. At 4.6 miles, pass a junction with the cross-connector trail, which leads a short distance south, across a bridge over the creek and to the south loop (see below). At 5.4 miles the main loop begins to climb out of the valley on an old railroad grade featuring many cuts and artificially leveled segments.

Now heading west, the trail crosses Crumb Road at 6.5 miles, makes a wide U-turn through high-altitude forest, proceeds eastbound, and crosses Crumb Road again at 8.1 miles. The trail passes several large meadows and evidence of ghost towns associated with the logging industry in the late 1800s. The trail then curves to the north and reaches the Wolf Rocks formation at 10.7 miles. The trail continues through a rocky area and returns to Babcock Picnic Area, ending the loop at 12.0 miles.

=== South loop ===
From the 4.6 mile point on the main loop (see above), a short cross-connector trail departs to the south and crosses a long suspension bridge over Clear Shade Creek and enters Clear Shade Wild Area. The cross-connector trail is just one-tenth of a mile long, and the listed length of the south loop includes two completions of the cross-connector. At the south end of the bridge, the hiker can turn left to follow the south loop clockwise. This trail also follows old railroad grades, but is somewhat more rugged and remote than the main loop.

For about the first mile, the south loop heads east through the wide valley of Clear Shade Creek, on the opposite side from the main loop. At 1.0 mile the trail turns to the south and rises moderately to the top of the Allegheny Plateau. After proceeding to the south then to the west, the trail reaches an Adirondack-style shelter at 3.7 miles. The trail descends and reaches the valley of Clear Shade Creek again at 4.3 miles, and turns sharply to the north. The trail uses several old logging railroad grades and returns to the junction with the cross-connector trail at 5.4 miles. After crossing the bridge again, the south loop returns to its origin at the main loop.
