= Dunning Creek =

Natural watercourse in Pennsylvania, US

Coordinates: 40.16250°N 78.59715°W

Dunning Creek is a 27.8-mile-long (44.7 km) tributary of the Raystown Branch Juniata River in south west/south central Pennsylvania in the United States.

Dunning Creek joins the Raystown Branch just downstream of Bedford.

== Bridges ==
- The Snooks Covered Bridge crosses Dunning Creek in East St. Clair Township.
- The New Paris Covered Bridge crosses Dunning Creek at Napier Township.
- The Dr. Knisley Covered Bridge crosses Dunning Creek at West St. Clair Township.

== See also ==
- List of rivers of Pennsylvania
