= Snooks Covered Bridge =

- U.S. National Register of Historic Places
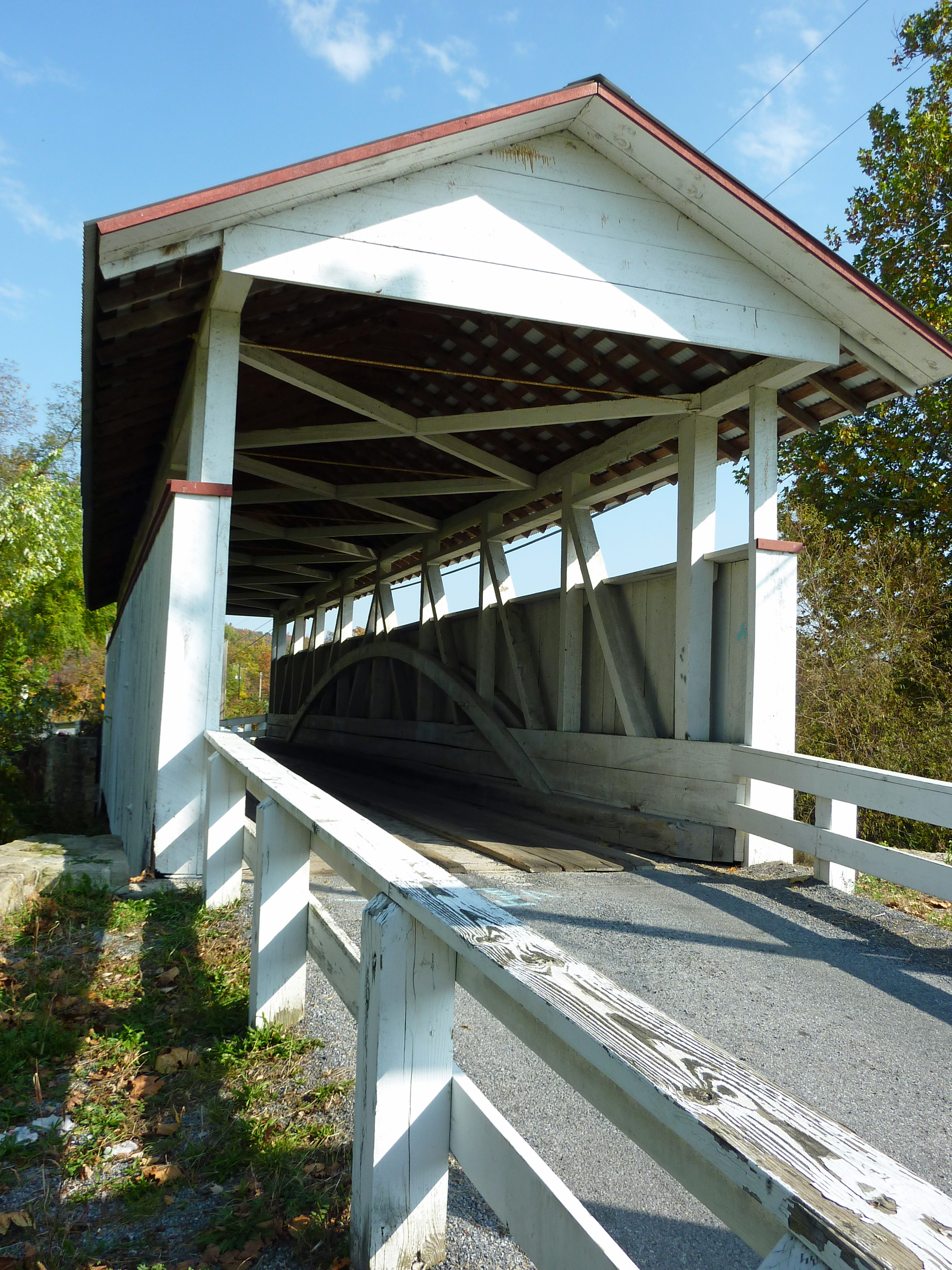
- Snooks Covered Bridge, October 2010

- Location within Pennsylvania Location within the United States
- Location: East of Alum Bank on Township 578, East St. Clair Township, Pennsylvania
- Coordinates: 40°10′9″N 78°34′48″W
- Area: less than one acre
- MPS: Bedford County Covered Bridges TR
- NRHP reference No.: 80003412
- Added to NRHP: April 10, 1980

The Snooks Covered Bridge is a historic wooden covered bridge located at East St. Clair Township Township in Bedford County, Pennsylvania. Built in 1883 "Visit PA"., it is a 75-foot-long (23 m), Burr Truss bridge with a shallow gable roof. It crosses Dunning Creek. It is one of 15 historic covered bridges in Bedford County.

It was listed on the National Register of Historic Places in 1980.
