= Pavia Township, Pennsylvania =

Township in Pennsylvania, US

Coordinates: 40°14′30″N 78°33′29″W

- Township
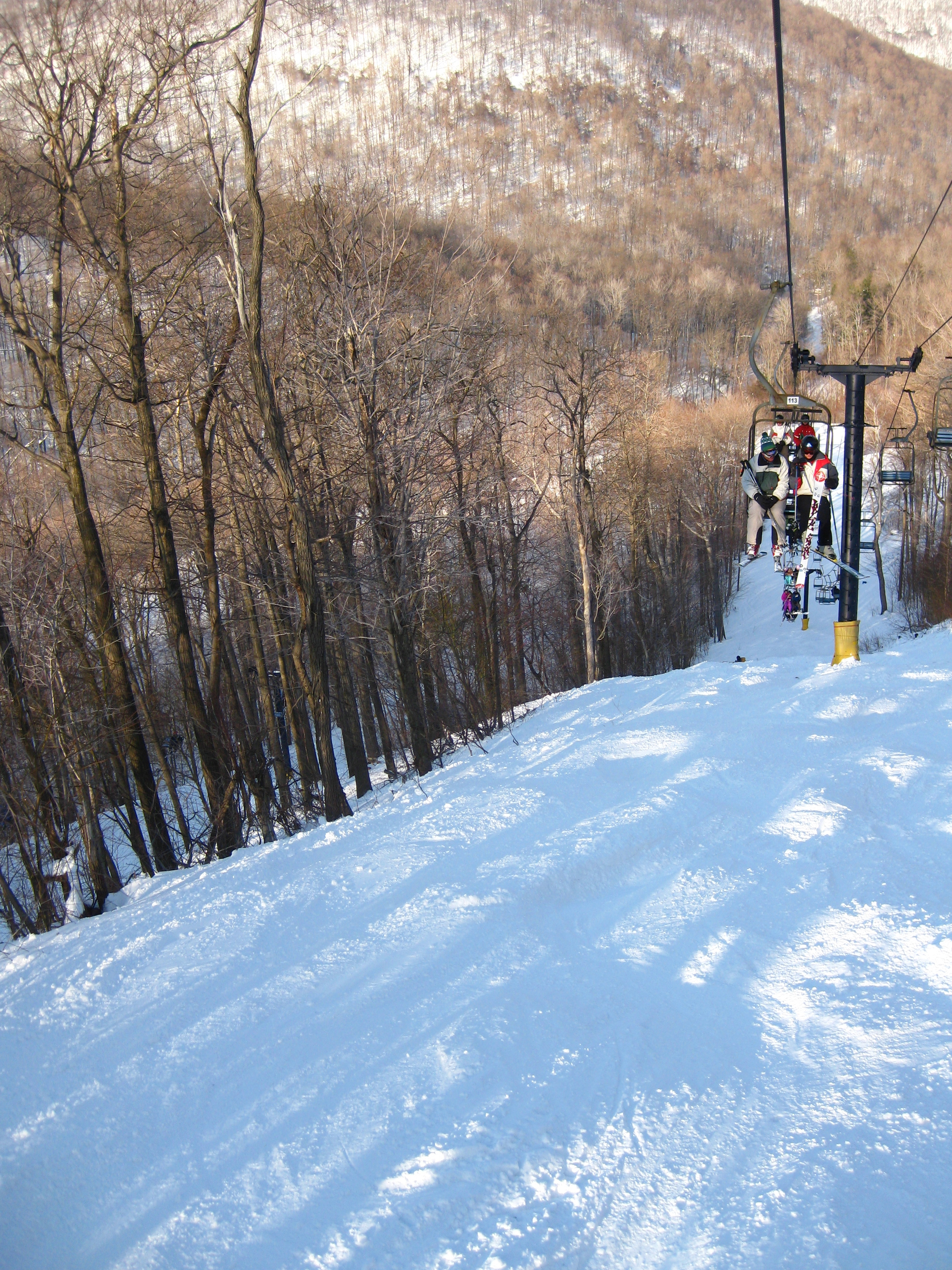
- Ski hill at Blue Knob State Park

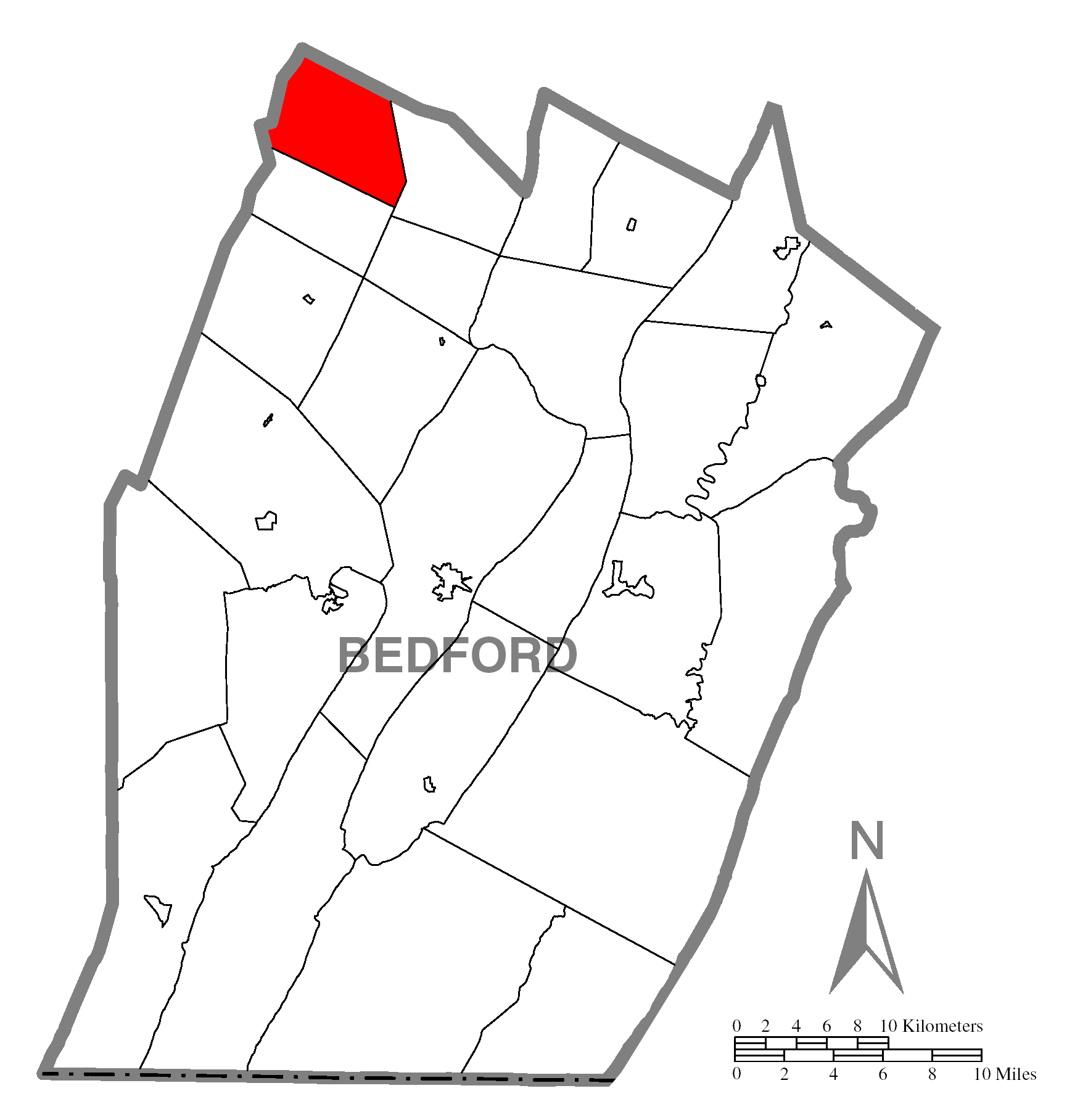
- Map of Bedford County, Pennsylvania highlighting Pavia Township

- Map of Bedford County, Pennsylvania
- Country: United States
- State: Pennsylvania
- County: Bedford
- Settled: 1794
- Incorporated: 1834, as Union Township
- Renamed: c. 1993 – 1995, as Pavia Township

Area
  - Total: 22.15 sq mi (57.36 km^{2})
  - Land: 22.14 sq mi (57.35 km^{2})
  - Water: 0.0039 sq mi (0.01 km^{2})

Population (2020)
  - Total: 288 ▼
  - Estimate (2023): 285
  - Density: 12.5/sq mi (4.81/km^{2})
- Time zone: UTC-5 (Eastern (EST))
  - Summer (DST): UTC-4 (EDT)
- Area code: 814
- FIPS code: 42-009-58492
- Website: https://paviatwp.com/

Pavia Township is a township that is located in Bedford County, Pennsylvania, United States. The population was 288 at the time of the 2020 census.

== History ==
The township was known as Union Township until it changed its name to Pavia Township sometime between 1993 and 1995.

== Geography ==
Pavia Township is located in the northwestern corner of Bedford County, bordered to the west by Cambria County and to the north by Blair County. A large portion of the township is occupied by Blue Knob State Park, including the 3,130-foot (950 m) summit of Blue Knob, the second highest peak in Pennsylvania.

Pennsylvania Route 869 is the only major road that passes through the township.

According to the United States Census Bureau, the township has a total area of 22.2 square miles (57.4 km^{2}), of which 0.004 square miles (0.01 km^{2}), or 0.02%, is water.

== Recreation ==
In addition to Blue Knob State Park, a portion of the Pennsylvania State Game Lands Number 26 occupies the northwestern portion of the township.

== Demographics ==
Historical population
Census	Pop.	Note	%±
2010	295		—
2020	288		−2.4%
2023 (est.)	285		−1.0%
U.S. Decennial Census

As of the census of 2000, there were 325 people, 122 households, and 91 families residing in the township.

The population density was 14.8 people per square mile (5.7 people/km^{2}). There were 191 housing units at an average density of 8.7 units per square mile (3.4 units/km^{2}).

The racial makeup of the township was 99.69% White and 0.31% Asian. Hispanic or Latino of any race were 0.31% of the population.

There were 122 households, out of which 33.6% had children who were under the age of eighteen; 62.3% were married couples living together, 8.2% had a female householder with no husband present, and 25.4% were non-families. 15.6% of all households were made up of individuals, and 6.6% had someone living alone who was sixty-five years of age or older.

The average household size was 2.66 and the average family size was 2.97.

Within the township, the population was spread out, with 24.6% of residents who were under the age of eighteen, 6.8% who were aged eighteen to twenty-four, 31.1% who were aged twenty-five to forty-four, 26.2% who were aged forty-five to sixty-four, and 11.4% who were sixty-five years of age or older. The median age was thirty-seven years.

For every one hundred females there were 112.4 males. For every one hundred females who were aged eighteen or older, there were 100.8 males.

The median income for a household in the township was $35,000, and the median income for a family was $38,750. Males had a median income of $25,000 compared with that of $21,250 for females.

The per capita income for the township was $16,115.

Approximately 5.8% of families and 9.1% of the population were living below the poverty line, including 7.0% of those who were under the age of eighteen and 19.0% of those who were aged sixty-five or older.
