= New Enterprise, Pennsylvania =

Unincorporated community in Pennsylvania, US

- Unincorporated community
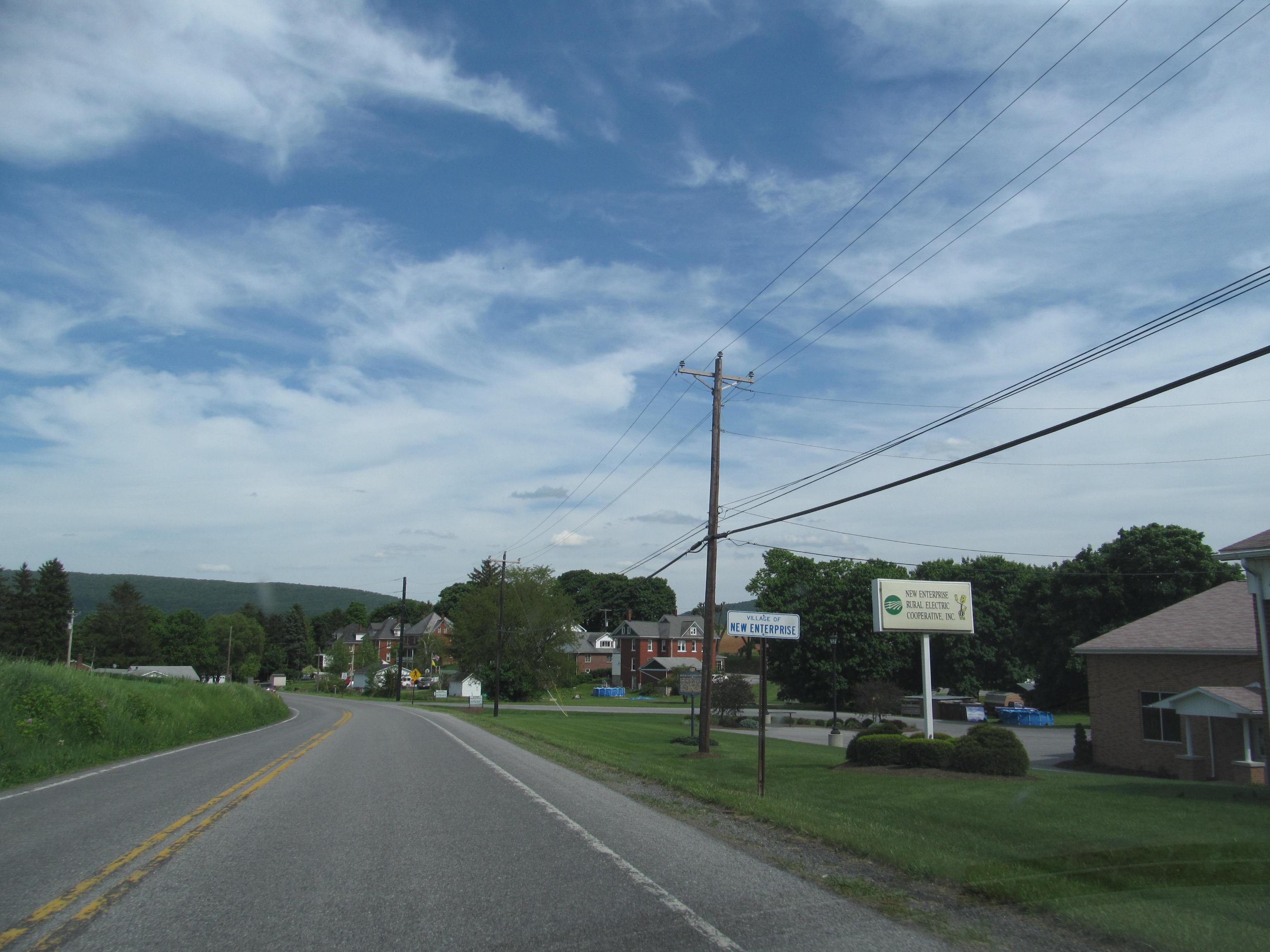
- Entering New Enterprise on PA 869

- Location within Pennsylvania
- Coordinates: 40°10′13″N 78°24′25″W
- Country: United States
- State: Pennsylvania
- County: Bedford
- Elevation: 1,240 ft (380 m)
- Time zone: UTC-5 (Eastern (EST))
  - Summer (DST): UTC-4 (EDT)
- ZIP code: 16664
- Area code: 814
- GNIS feature ID: 1182314

New Enterprise is an unincorporated community in Bedford County, Pennsylvania. The community is located along Pennsylvania Route 869, 11.6 miles (18.7 km) north-northeast of Bedford. New Enterprise has a post office, with ZIP code 16664.
