= Blue Knob State Park =

State Park in Pennsylvania, United States

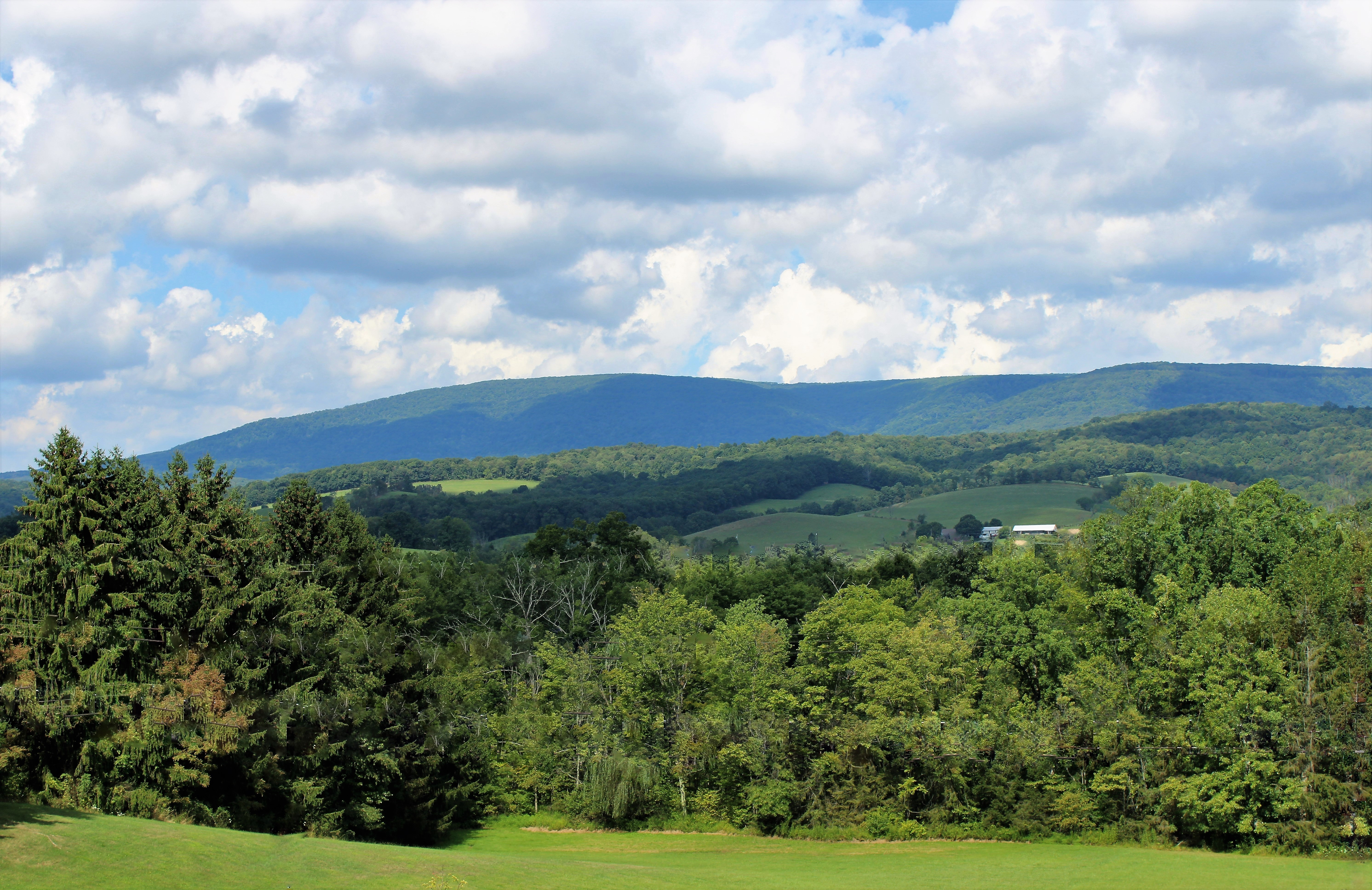
- Blue Knob as seen from a nearby valley

- Location within Pennsylvania Location within the United States
- Interactive map of Blue Knob State Park
- Location: Bedford County, Pennsylvania, United States
- Coordinates: 40°16′00″N 78°35′02″W
- Area: 6,128 acres (2,480 ha)
- Elevation: 1,919 ft (585 m)
- Established: 1945
- Administrator: Pennsylvania Department of Conservation and Natural Resources
- Named for: Blue Knob Mountain
- Website: Official website
- Pennsylvania State Parks

Blue Knob State Park is a 6,128-acre (2,480 ha) Pennsylvania state park in Kimmel, Lincoln, and Pavia townships in Bedford County, Pennsylvania, in the United States. The average annual snowfall at the park is about 12 feet (370 cm). The park is named for Blue Knob, the second highest mountain in Pennsylvania at 3,146 feet (959 m). It is the location of Blue Knob All Seasons Resort, the ski slope in Pennsylvania with the highest elevation. Blue Knob State Park is just off Interstate 99 on Pennsylvania Route 869 west of Pavia.

== History ==
The earliest settlers to the Blue Knob area were of German descent. They cleared and farmed the land soon after the American Revolution. They also built several distilleries, a lumber mill and gristmill.

The logging boom that swept over most of the mountains and forests of Pennsylvania drastically altered the landscape surrounding Blue Knob State Park. The old-growth forests of hemlock were clear cut. The timber was hauled away on trains that climbed the steep hillsides. A railroad that followed Bobs Creek used six switchbacks to ascend the mountain. Another railroad used five switchbacks to climb the hills near Wallacks Branch. These railroad grades are still used today to gain access to State Gamelands. The train tracks have since been removed and replaced with hiking trails.

The lumber industry abandoned the lands once all the salable timber had been harvested. They left behind a wasteland of dried out tree tops that were ignited by passing steam locomotives. The land was scarred by immense wild fires. The wildlife that had once thrived in the area was also gone due to over-hunting and deforestation.

The efforts of the National Park Service are largely responsible for the reforestation of Blue Knob State Park. Blue Knob National Recreation Demonstration Area was opened by the park service in 1935. The park was built by the men of the Works Projects Administration and the young men of the Civilian Conservation Corps with the cooperation of Pennsylvania Governor Gifford Pinchot. The WPA and CCC were established by President Franklin D. Roosevelt during the Great Depression to provide work for the unemployed. Ownership of the park was transferred to the Commonwealth of Pennsylvania on September 26, 1945 and Blue Knob State Park was officially opened.

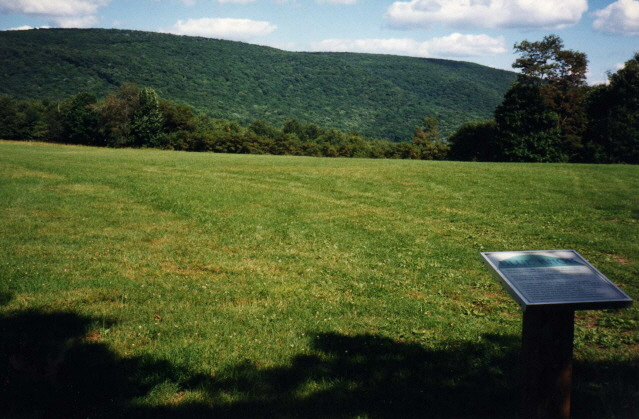
View of the meadow at Chappel's Field.

== Geology ==
The bedrock in the valleys of the park consists of the Upper Devonian Catskill Formation, consisting of sequences of sandstone, siltstone, and shale. The mountains in the park are capped by the Mississippian Burgoon Sandstone, which is underlain by the transitional Devonian-Mississippian Rockwell Formation, consisting of crossbedded argillaceous sandstone with some shale beds.

== Recreation ==
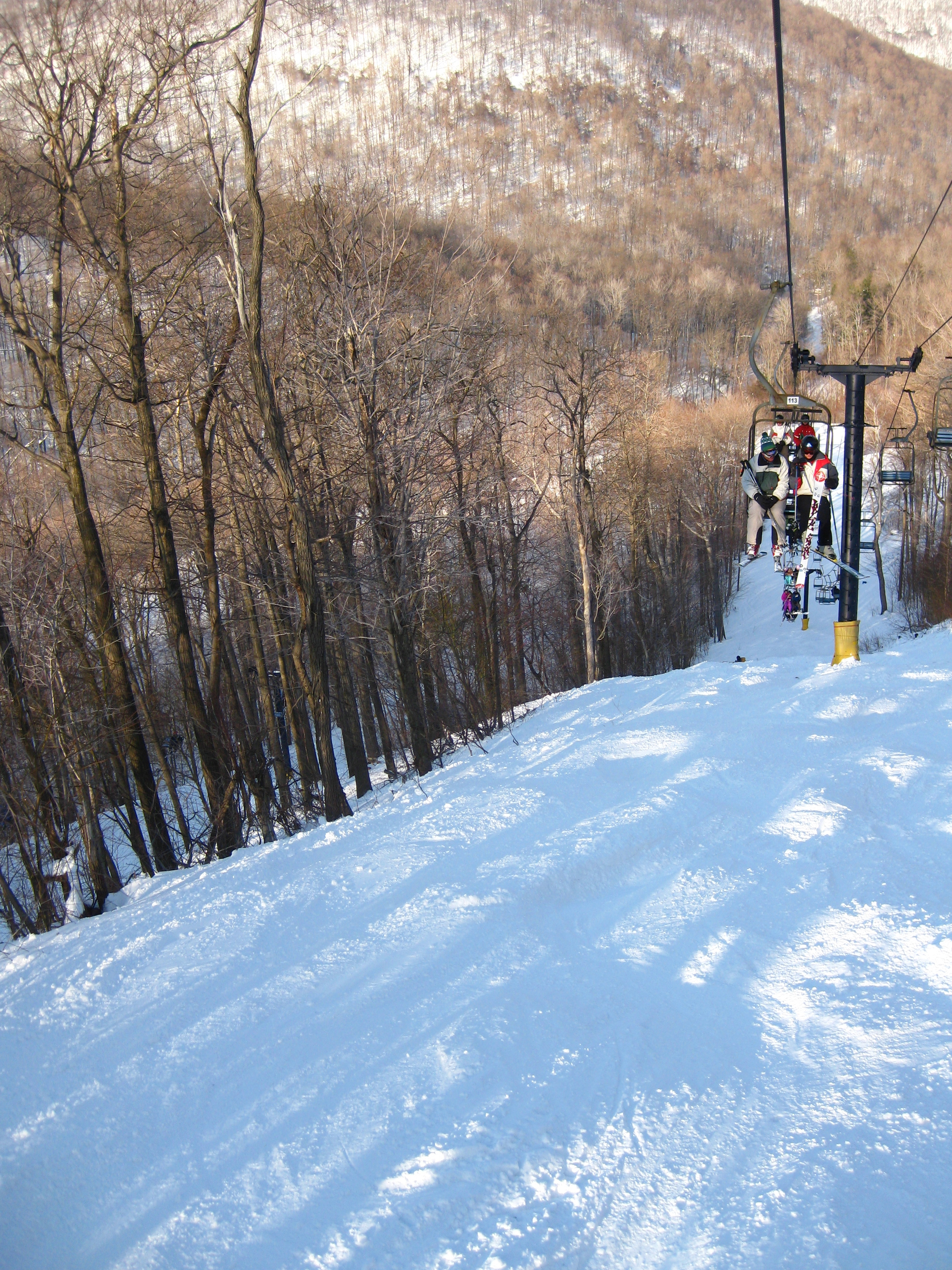
A chair lift over a ski trail at Blue Knob Resort

=== Resort ===
Blue Knob All Seasons Resort is open year-round. Amenities include skiing, cross-country skiing, snow boarding, tubing, mountain biking, a golf course, a swimming pool and a lodge.

The resort was once the site of a military base. The Gauthier family acquired the property in 1983. Sustainable Hospitality and Development purchased it in 2017.

=== Swimming ===
There is a swimming pool at the park that is separate from the pool at the resort. It opens Memorial Day weekend and closes Labor Day weekend. The hours of operation are 11:00 am until 7:00 pm. Lifeguards are provided.

=== Picnics ===
There are three picnic areas at Blue Knob State Park with over 200 picnic tables. Mowery Hollow and Burnt House picnic areas are open year-round. Willow Springs picnic area opens the weekend before Memorial Day and closes the day after Thanksgiving.

=== Camping ===
Blue Knob State Park has a campground with 45 sites, 43 of which have connections to an electrical supply. 43 sites will accommodate tents or campers. Two of the sites are walk-in only. The campground has running water, a sanitary dump station, modern restrooms and a playground.

A group of cabins, built and used by the CCC, is available for rent by large groups. The cabin area has a large dining hall and kitchen area and a shower house.

=== Hunting and fishing ===
Hunting is permitted on about 5,000 acres (2,000 ha) of Blue Knob State Park. The most common game species are turkey, squirrels and white-tailed deer. The hunting of groundhogs is prohibited. Hunters are expected to follow the rules and regulations of the Pennsylvania Game Commission. The park is next to Pennsylvania State Game Land 26. There are parking lots and trails at Blue Knob State Park for those interested parking at the state park and hiking into the gamelands.

=== Trails ===
Blue Knob contains a vast network of hiking trails that range from easy walks to difficult and challenging day hikes. The total network of trails is approximately 18 miles in length. Most of these trails are multiple use for hiking, cross country skiing, mountain biking, horseback riding and snowmobiling. Below is a brief description of each trail that can be found on the mountain.

Mountain View Trail

This trail is 5 miles in length and one of the more difficult on the mountain. It is marked with a double red blaze and the trailhead can be found on the Tower Road just below the summit. The Mountain View Trail begins at about the 3,000 ft. contour and begins by looping around a gentle grade on the upper portion of the mountain's east shoulder. This part of the mountain is marked by stunted and wind deformed trees, mainly scrub oak and striped maple. Also large slabs of the conglomerate rocks that form this mountain may be seen strewn about on these upper slopes. This trail passes two lookouts, the Pavia Overlook and the Queen Overlook before descending into the Beaverdam Creek drainage and the lowest portion of this trail at the 2,000 ft. contour. The trail then traverses the east face of the mountain to the Willow Springs picnic area before it begins its steep ascent on the west face of the mountain and back to the trailhead.

Three Springs Trail

This trail is 2 miles in length and follows an old roadbed. The trail is wide and good for snowmobiles and horseback riding. This trail can be accessed from the Mountain View Trail at about the 3,050 ft. contour and generally runs downslope before it bisects the east face, and ends at the 2,500 ft. contour where it junctions once again with the Mountain View Trail. Along its length you can see how the trail got its name by the number of springs that are used for supplying water to the villages below the mountain.

Rock N' Ridge Trail

This trail begins at the 1,550 ft. contour just above the gated entrance to the park headquarters. It is 2.8 miles in length and marked by an inverted blue "T". The trail is located on the west side of the mountain and begins by following a ridge that abuts the main dome of the mountain. On this trail you may see mountain laurel which is the Pennsylvania State Flower. When the mountain laurel blooms in June it makes for a very scenic hike. The trail eventually junctions into the Sawmill trail at the 2,400 ft. contour, before this however, the trail has a turnoff which will descend down the Pavia Run drainage and end at the Mowry Hollow Picnic Area.

Sawmill Trail

The Sawmill Trail crosses the west face of the mountain and is 3 miles in length, marked by yellow blazes. This is another wide trail that follows an old roadbed and is suitable for snowmobiles and mountain biking. The trailheads are located at either end of the trail, off the Knob Road or on State Route 403 on Ickes Hill. From the Ickes Hill end, the trail ascends the southwest buttress of the mountain to the Willow Springs Picnic Area at the 2,250 ft contour. From there, it follows the Mountain View Trail briefly before rejoining the Sawmill Trail. The trail moves across the hollows of the mountain at approximately the 2,400 ft contour before it ends at the north end of Chappell Field and the trail head on the Knob Road. The trail passes through hardwood forest and over mountain seeps that drain from the upper slopes of the mountain.

Homestead Trail

This 1.8 mile trail is a small loop marked by orange blazes. It is accessible from the Whysong Road or by a connector trail off the Sawmill Trail. The hike is on the lower portions of the mountain and only gains to the 2,100 ft. contour. The trail is easy and wide open and as its name suggests, marks the site of an old settlers' house. Hiking along this pathway affords good opportunities for viewing wildlife.

Chappell's Field Trail

The Chappell's Field Trail is accessible at points on the Knob Road and campground areas. The trail is located on one of the main ridges that are found on the west side of the mountain. On the top of this ridge, which is over 2,400 ft., Chapell's Field holds one of the best views in the park as it looks up at the main summit of Blue Knob and down on the valley below. The trail encircles the top of this ridge and is 2.5 miles in length, a loop marked by inverted orange "V" blazes.

Crist Ridge Trail

The 1.9 mile orange blazed trail connects to the Chappell's Field Trail at the 2,250 ft. contour and winds its way down the ridge ending on the Knob Road. This trail had large areas of blowdowns on it following the wind events in September 2004. Since then the trail has been cleared and is a good trail for mountain biking and cross country skiing. In the winter with the foliage down, views of Blue Knob Mountain can be seen through the trees.

Lost Turkey Trail

This is the longest and most difficult trail at 26 miles long. The trail begins on 3,034 foot Herman Point and is marked by red blazes. The trail crosses over both public and private lands as it eventually ends in neighboring Somerset County. To begin this hike you must proceed up the Tower Road and pass by the gated road which leads to Herman Point and the transmitter towers on its summit. Just behind the fenced in towers, you can see the trail which proceeds down the steep face of the mountain into the Rhodes Run drainage. From here the trail follows Ciana Run before crossing Hogback ridge, then beginning its steep ascent up Forks Ridge and the Allegheny Front beyond. Once on top of the Allegheny Plateau it winds its way through high elevation forests and mountain bogs. Proper footwear is recommended for this hike as it is steep in some areas and stream crossings are required along its length.

Connector Trails

There are several connector trails that make up the remaining mileage on Blue Knob's trails system. They are double blue blazed markings and vary in length and difficulty.

Bobs Creek is stocked with trout by the Pennsylvania Fish and Boat Commission in co-operation with the Pavia Sportsmen Club Inc. There is also a population of native brook trout in Bobs Creek and its tributaries.
