= St. Michael-Sidman, Pennsylvania =

St. Michael-Sidman
- Former CDP
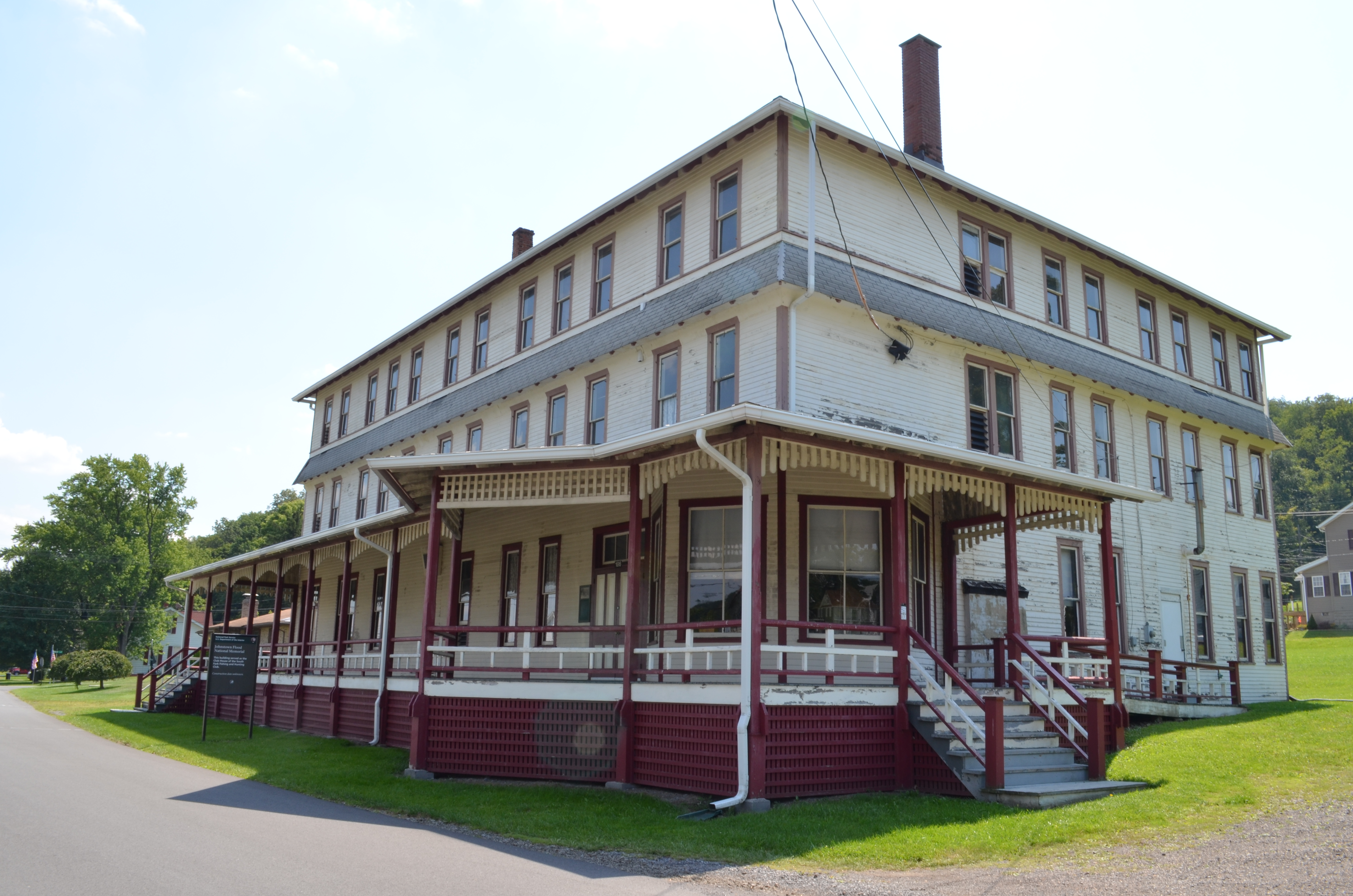
- Clubhouse for the former South Fork Fishing and Hunting Club

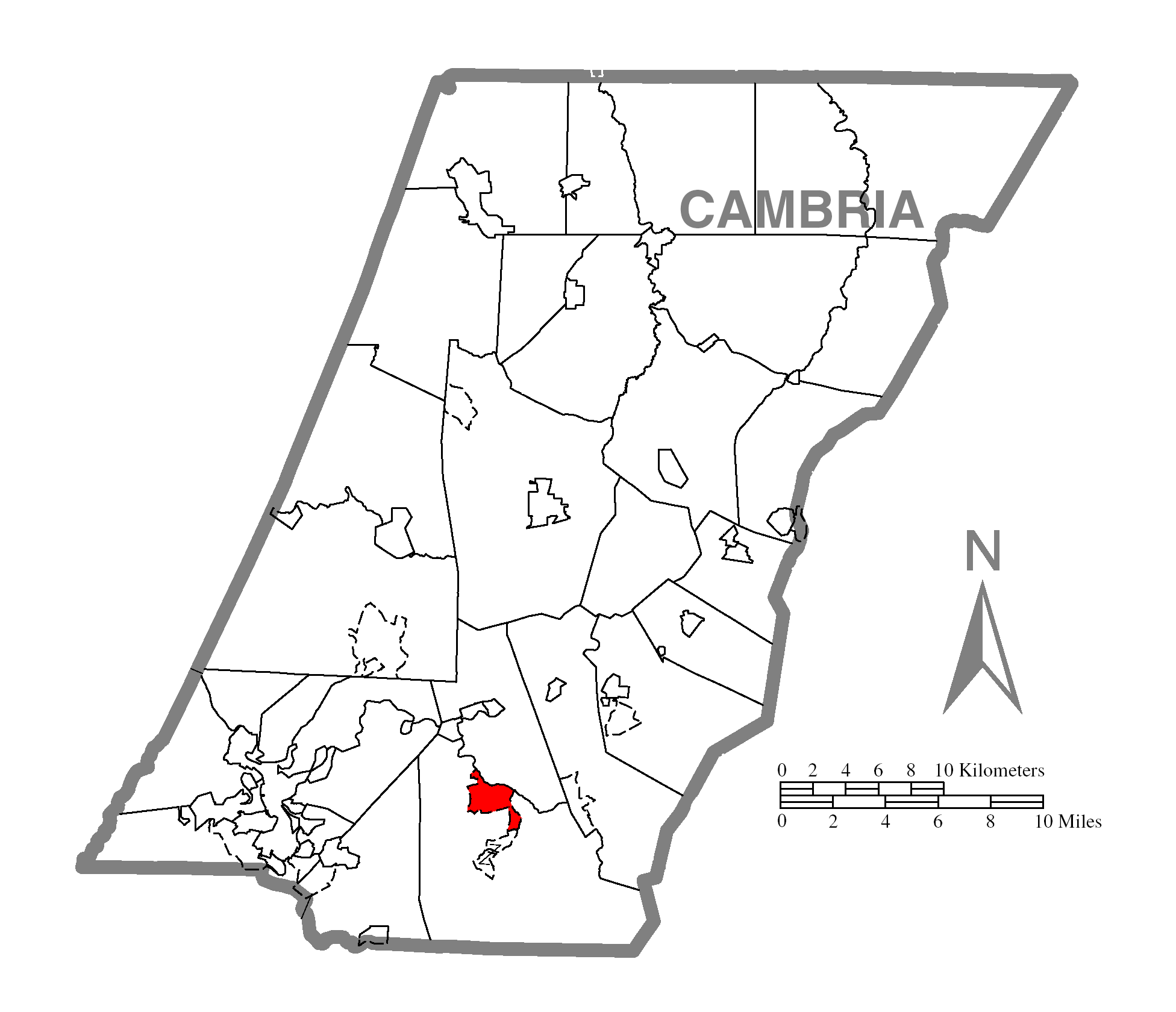
- Location within Cambria County

- Location within the U.S. state of Pennsylvania St. Michael-Sidman (the United States)
- Coordinates: 40°19′55″N 78°45′37″W
- Country: United States
- State: Pennsylvania
- County: Cambria

Area
  - Total: 2.0 sq mi (5.3 km^{2})

Population (2000)
  - Total: 973
  - Density: 480/sq mi (180/km^{2})
- Time zone: UTC-5 (Eastern (EST))
  - Summer (DST): UTC-4 (EDT)

St. Michael-Sidman was a census-designated place (CDP) in Cambria County, Pennsylvania, United States. The population was 973 at the 2000 census. For the 2010 census, the area was split into two CDPs, St. Michael and Sidman.

== Geography ==
St. Michael-Sidman was located at 40°19′55″N 78°45′37″W (40.331874, -78.760371).

According to the United States Census Bureau, the CDP had a total area of 2.0 square miles (5.2 km^{2}), of which 2.0 square miles (5.2 km^{2}) was land and 0.49% was water.

== Demographics ==
As of the census of 2000, there were 973 people, 396 households, and 277 families residing in the CDP. The population density was 480.3 inhabitants per square mile (185.4/km^{2}). There were 417 housing units at an average density of 205.8 per square mile (79.5/km^{2}). The racial makeup of the CDP was 98.77% White, 0.21% African American, 0.10% Pacific Islander, 0.21% from other races, and 0.72% from two or more races. Hispanic or Latino of any race were 0.62% of the population.

There were 396 households, out of which 26.3% had children under the age of 18 living with them, 56.1% were married couples living together, 11.1% had a female householder with no husband present, and 29.8% were non-families. 27.8% of all households were made up of individuals, and 16.9% had someone living alone who was 65 years of age or older. The average household size was 2.40 and the average family size was 2.91.

In the CDP, the population was spread out, with 19.8% under the age of 18, 8.2% from 18 to 24, 27.3% from 25 to 44, 22.7% from 45 to 64, and 21.9% who were 65 years of age or older. The median age was 42 years. For every 100 females, there were 87.8 males. For every 100 females age 18 and over, there were 86.6 males.

The median income for a household in the CDP was $30,673, and the median income for a family was $33,906. Males had a median income of $30,179 versus $17,200 for females. The per capita income for the CDP was $13,914. About 8.5% of families and 16.2% of the population were below the poverty line, including 6.9% of those under age 18 and 33.8% of those age 65 or over.
