= Bakers Summit, Pennsylvania =

- Town
- Location within the state of Pennsylvania
- Coordinates: 40°15′46″N 78°25′15″W
- Country: United States
- State: Pennsylvania
- County: Bedford
- Township: Bloomfield
- Time zone: UTC-5 (Eastern (EST))
  - Summer (DST): UTC-4 (EDT)
- Area code: 814

Bakers Summit in Morrisons Cove is located in Bloomfield Township, Bedford County, Pennsylvania. Founded in 1870 and formerly known as Bakersville, it changed its name to Bakers Summit in 1876, when the Bakers Summit Post Office was established.

Halter Creek originates near Bakers Summit.
