= Halter Creek =

Coordinates: 40°22′38″N 78°25′19″W

Halter Creek is a 9.5-mile-long (15.3 km) tributary of the Frankstown Branch of the Juniata River in Bedford and Blair counties, Pennsylvania, in the United States.

It originates at Bakers Summit in Bedford County east of Dunning Mountain. It flows northward through Roaring Spring, and then through McKee Gap between Dunning Mountain and Short Mountain. It flows into the Frankstown Branch south of Newry.

== See also ==
- List of rivers of Pennsylvania
