= Chestnut Ridge School District =

School district in Pennsylvania

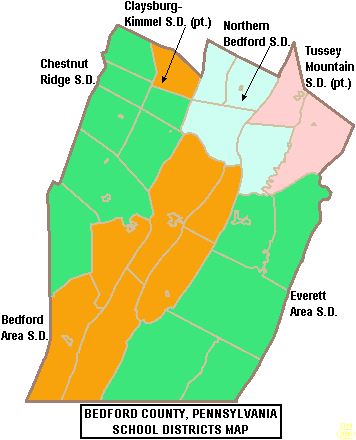

Chestnut Ridge School District is a school district in Bedford County, Pennsylvania, United States. The District includes the Central Elementary School, Middle School, and Senior High School,

== Extracurriculars ==
The district offers a variety of clubs, activities and sports.

=== Sports ===
The district funds:

Varsity

Boys

- Baseball - AA
- Basketball- AA
- Cross country - AA
- Football - AA
- Golf - AA
- Rifle - AAAA
- Soccer - AA
- Track and field - AA
- Wrestling - AA

Girls

- Basketball - AA
- Cheer - AAAA
- Cross country - A
- Golf - AA
- Rifle - AAAA
- Soccer (fall) - A
- Softball - AAA
- Tennis - AA
- Track and field - AA
- Volleyball - AA

Middle school sports:

Boys

- Baseball
- Basketball
- Football
- Wrestling

Girls

- Basketball
- Softball
- Volleyball

According to PIAA directory July 2015
