= Bobs Creek (Pennsylvania) =

River in Pennsylvania, United States

Coordinates: 40.144246°N 78.556963°W

Bobs Creek is a tributary of Dunning Creek in south west/south central Pennsylvania in the United States.

Via Dunning Creek, it is part of the watershed of the Raystown Branch Juniata River, flowing to the Juniata River, the Susquehanna River, and the Chesapeake Bay. Bobs Creek is 21.7 miles (34.9 km) long and is rated by American Whitewater as having a class I-III section for rafting and kayaking.

== Bridges ==
- The Osterburg Covered Bridge crosses Bobs Creek in East St. Clair Township, Pennsylvania.

== See also ==
- List of rivers of Pennsylvania
