= St. Clairsville, Pennsylvania =

Borough in Pennsylvania, US

- Borough
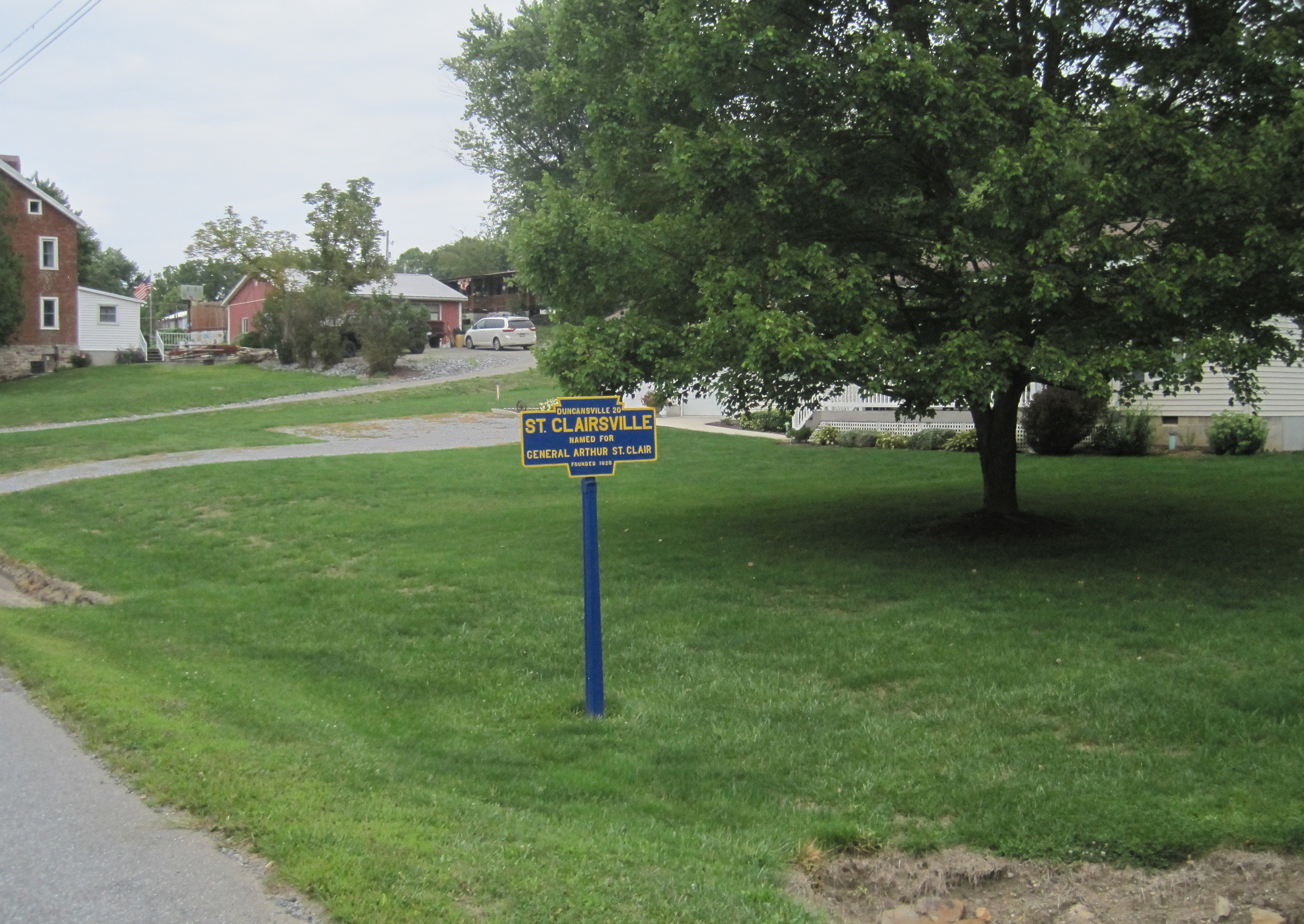
- Borough's Keystone Marker

- Location of St. Clairsville in Bedford County, Pennsylvania.

- Location within Pennsylvania
- Coordinates: 40°09′22″N 78°30′38″W
- Country: United States
- State: Pennsylvania
- County: Bedford
- Settled: 1820
- Incorporated: 1867

Government
  - Type: Borough Council

Area
  - Total: 0.031 sq mi (0.08 km^{2})
  - Land: 0.031 sq mi (0.08 km^{2})
  - Water: 0 sq mi (0.00 km^{2})
- Elevation: 1,135 ft (346 m)

Population (2020)
  - Total: 76 ▼
  - Estimate (2021): 75
  - Density: 2,481.6/sq mi (958.16/km^{2})
- Time zone: UTC-5 (Eastern (EST))
  - Summer (DST): UTC-4 (EDT)
- Zip code: 16667
- Area code: 814
- FIPS code: 42-67256

St. Clairsville is a borough in Bedford County, Pennsylvania, United States. The population was 76 at the 2020 census.

St. Clairsville was named after Major-General Arthur St. Clair, Revolutionary War veteran and Northwest Territory governor.

== Geography ==
St. Clairsville is located in northern Bedford County at 40°9′22″N 78°30′38″W (40.155985, -78.510515). It lies at the base of Evitts Mountain, which rises to the east.

The Interstate 99/U.S. 220 freeway passes just to the east of the borough, with access from Exit 7. Bedford, the county seat, is 11 miles (18 km) to the south, and Altoona is 29 miles (47 km) to the north. US-220's former alignment, Pennsylvania Route 869, passes just to the west of St. Clairsville, leading south to I-99's Exit 7 and north 1.0 mile (1.6 km) to Osterburg.

According to the United States Census Bureau, St. Clairsville has a total area of 0.03 square miles (0.08 km^{2}), all land.

== Demographics ==
Historical population
Census	Pop.	Note	%±
1870	144		—
1880	144		0.0%
1890	134		−6.9%
1900	102		−23.9%
1910	101		−1.0%
1920	97		−4.0%
1930	108		11.3%
1940	114		5.6%
1950	127		11.4%
1960	115		−9.4%
1970	96		−16.5%
1980	90		−6.2%
1990	88		−2.2%
2000	86		−2.3%
2010	78		−9.3%
2020	76		−2.6%
2021 (est.)	75	▼	−1.3%

As of the census of 2000, there were 86 people, 36 households, and 25 families residing in the borough. The population density was 2,692.7 inhabitants per square mile (1,039.7/km^{2}). There were 38 housing units at an average density of 1,189.8 per square mile (459.4/km^{2}). The racial makeup of the borough was 97.67% White, and 2.33% from two or more races.

There were 36 households, out of which 30.6% had children under the age of 18 living with them, 52.8% were married couples living together, 11.1% had a female householder with no husband present, and 27.8% were non-families. 27.8% of all households were made up of individuals, and 16.7% had someone living alone who was 65 years of age or older. The average household size was 2.39 and the average family size was 2.88.

In the borough the population was spread out, with 20.9% under the age of 18, 14.0% from 18 to 24, 26.7% from 25 to 44, 27.9% from 45 to 64, and 10.5% who were 65 years of age or older. The median age was 36 years. For every 100 females there were 83.0 males. For every 100 females age 18 and over, there were 94.3 males.

The median income for a household in the borough was $20,833, and the median income for a family was $22,500. Males had a median income of $17,500 versus $23,750 for females. The per capita income for the borough was $11,542. There were no families and 2.4% of the population living below the poverty line, including no under eighteens and none of those over 64.
