= Bloomfield Township, Bedford County, Pennsylvania =

Township in Pennsylvania, US

- Township
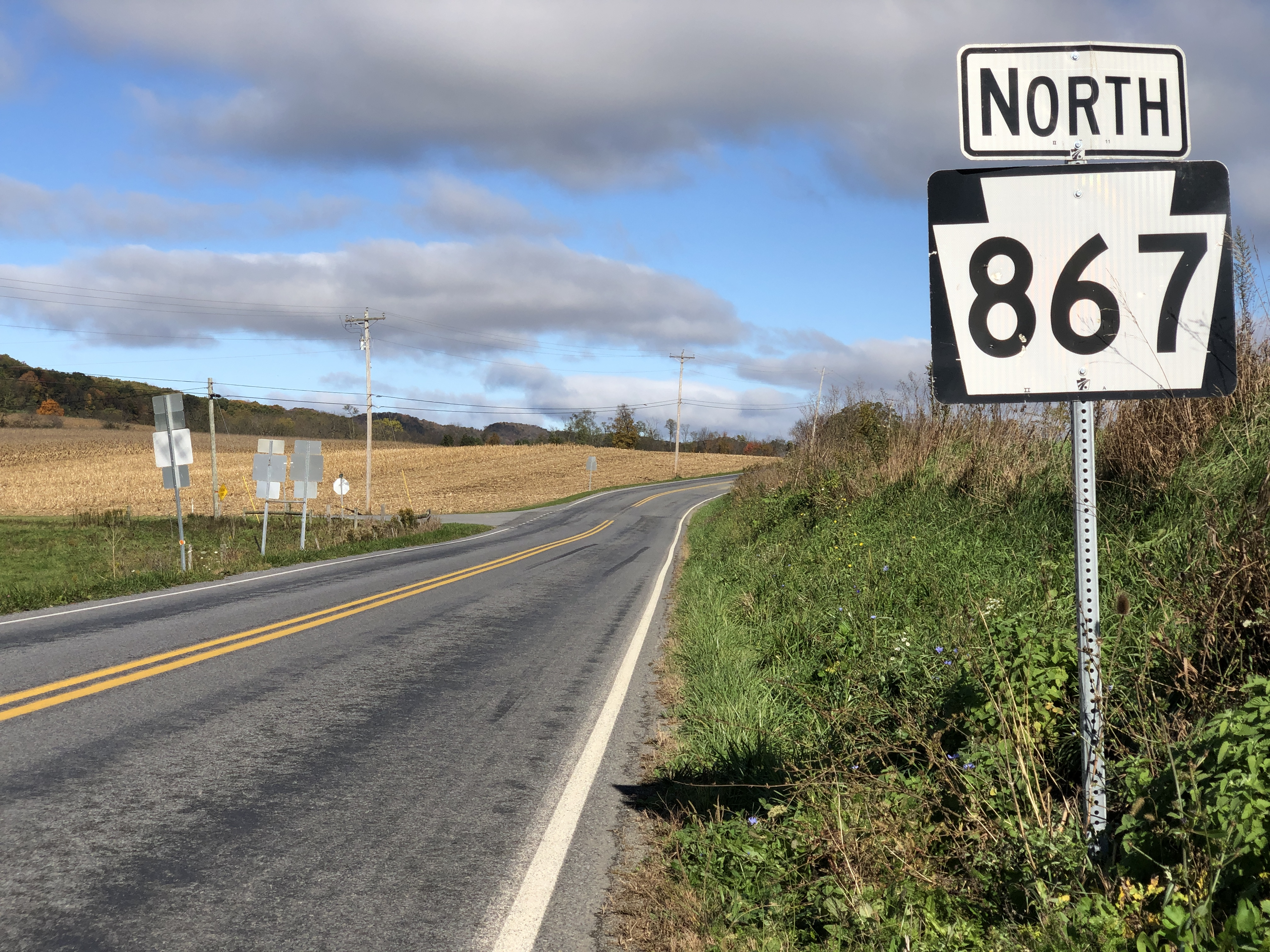
- PA 867 in Bloomfield Township

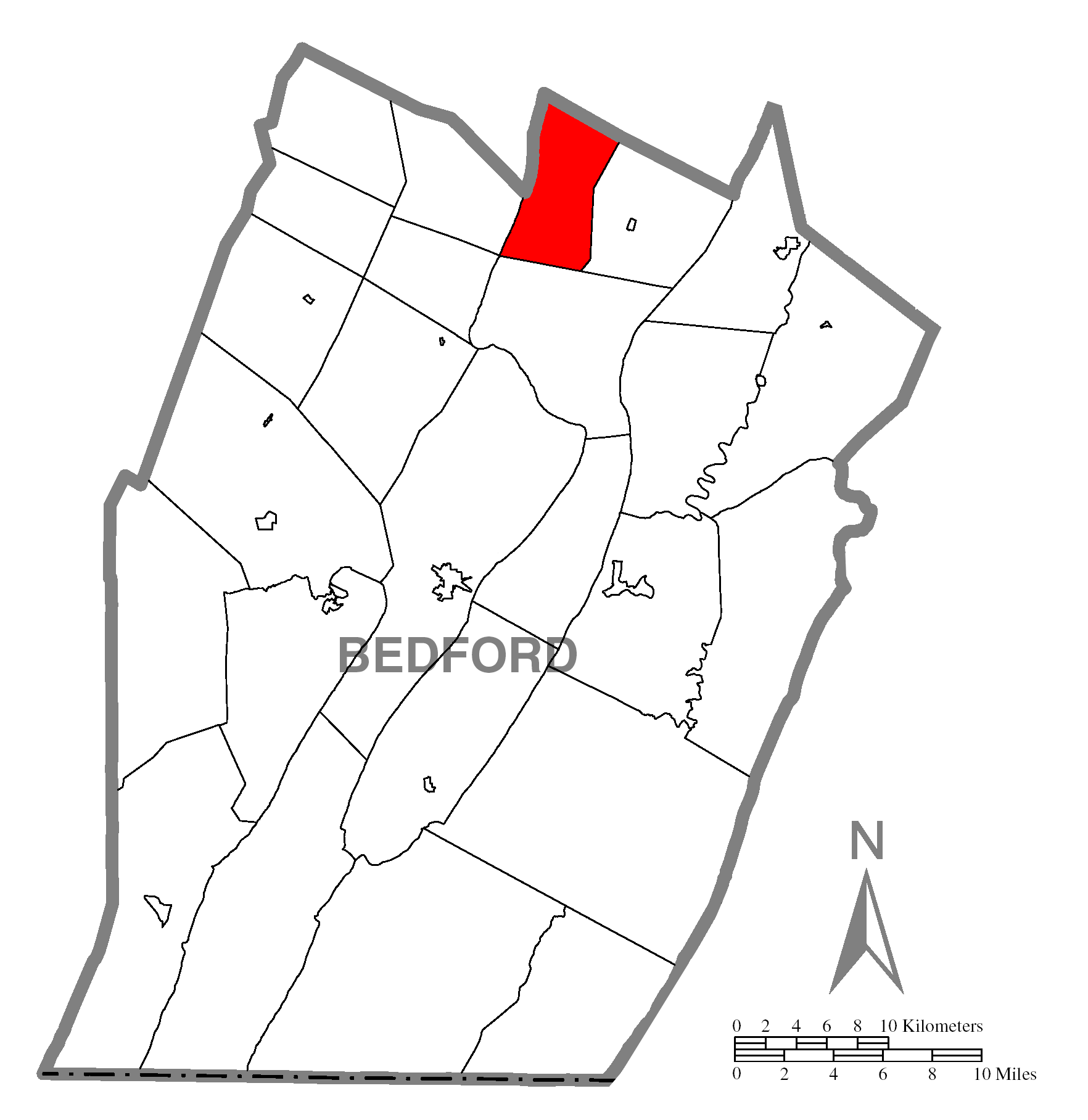
- Map of Bedford County, Pennsylvania highlighting Bloomfield Township

- Map of Bedford County, Pennsylvania
- Coordinates: 40°13′00″N 78°24′59″W
- Country: United States
- State: Pennsylvania
- County: Bedford
- Settled: 1796
- Incorporated: 1876

Area
  - Total: 19.40 sq mi (50.24 km^{2})
  - Land: 19.39 sq mi (50.23 km^{2})
  - Water: 0.0039 sq mi (0.01 km^{2})

Population (2020)
  - Total: 1,039 ▲
  - Estimate (2023): 1,037
  - Density: 51.2/sq mi (19.75/km^{2})
- Time zone: UTC-5 (Eastern (EST))
  - Summer (DST): UTC-4 (EDT)
- Area code: 814
- FIPS code: 42-009-07024

Bloomfield Township is a township in Bedford County, Pennsylvania, United States. The population was 1,039 at the 2020 census.

== Geography ==
Bloomfield Township is located in northern Bedford County. It is bordered to the east by Woodbury Township, to the south by South Woodbury Township, at its southwestern corner by King Township, and to the west by Kimmel Township. The northern and part of the western borders of Bloomfield Township form the Bedford County line, with the Blair County townships of Greenfield and Taylor to the west and north, respectively. The western boundary of the township is formed by the ridgecrest of Dunning Mountain.

According to the United States Census Bureau, Bloomfield Township has a total area of 19.40 square miles (50.24 km^{2}), of which 0.004 square miles (0.01 km^{2}), or 0.03%, is water.

== Recreation ==
A portion of the Pennsylvania State Game Lands Number 41 is located in the township.

== Demographics ==
Historical population
Census	Pop.	Note	%±
2010	1,016		—
2020	1,039		2.3%
2023 (est.)	1,037		−0.2%
U.S. Decennial Census

As of the census of 2000, there were 973 people, 335 households, and 278 families residing in the township. The population density was 50.0 inhabitants per square mile (19.3/km^{2}). There were 356 housing units at an average density of 18.3/sq mi (7.1/km^{2}). The racial makeup of the township was 98.97% White, 0.10% African American, 0.10% Native American, 0.10% Asian, 0.10% from other races, and 0.62% from two or more races. Hispanic or Latino of any race were 0.62% of the population.

There were 335 households, out of which 40.3% had children under the age of 18 living with them, 75.8% were married couples living together, 2.4% had a female householder with no husband present, and 17.0% were non-families. 14.3% of all households were made up of individuals, and 3.9% had someone living alone who was 65 years of age or older. The average household size was 2.90 and the average family size was 3.22.

In the township the population was spread out, with 29.7% under the age of 18, 7.2% from 18 to 24, 30.5% from 25 to 44, 23.7% from 45 to 64, and 8.8% who were 65 years of age or older. The median age was 35 years. For every 100 females, there were 96.6 males. For every 100 females age 18 and over, there were 101.8 males.

The median income for a household in the toBloomfield Townshipwnship was $39,087, and the median income for a family was $42,188. Males had a median income of $30,750 versus $20,625 for females. The per capita income for the township was $16,325. About 3.1% of families and 5.8% of the population were below the poverty line, including 10.0% of those under age 18 and 6.7% of those age 65 or over.
