= East St. Clair Township, Pennsylvania =

Township in Pennsylvania, US

Coordinates: 40.1357°N 78.5470°W

- Township
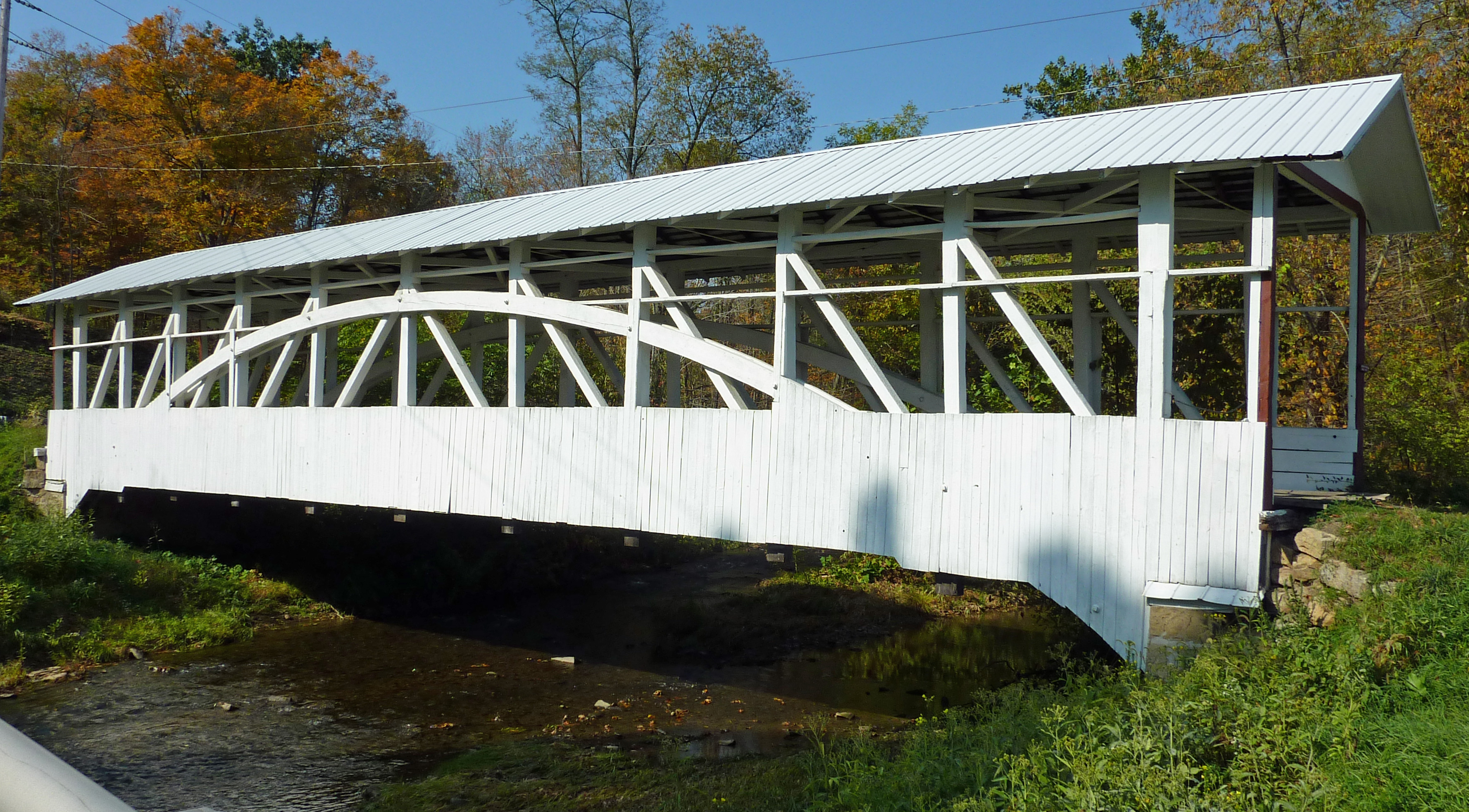
- Osterburg Covered Bridge

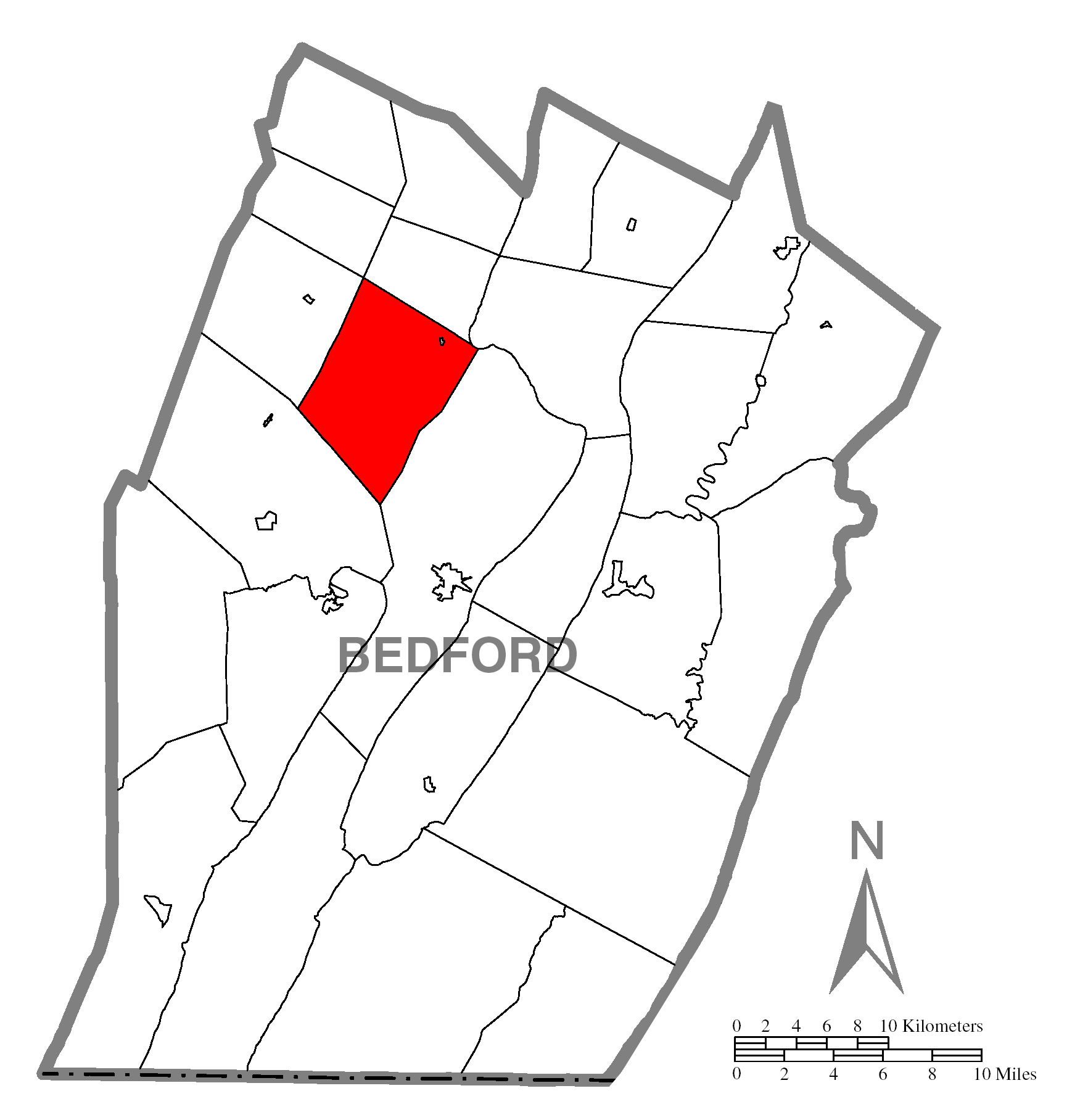
- Map of Bedford County, Pennsylvania highlighting East St. Clair Township

- Map of Bedford County, Pennsylvania
- Country: United States
- State: Pennsylvania
- County: Bedford
- Settled: 1794
- Incorporated: 1875

Area
  - Total: 34.05 sq mi (88.18 km^{2})
  - Land: 33.89 sq mi (87.78 km^{2})
  - Water: 0.15 sq mi (0.40 km^{2})

Population (2020)
  - Total: 2,908 ▼
  - Estimate (2023): 2,889
  - Density: 86.5/sq mi (33.38/km^{2})
- Time zone: UTC-5 (Eastern (EST))
  - Summer (DST): UTC-4 (EDT)
- Area code: 814
- FIPS code: 42-009-21788

East St. Clair Township is a township in Bedford County, Pennsylvania, United States. The population was 2,908 at the 2020 census.

== History ==
St. Clair Township was originally organized in 1794 from a portion of Bedford Township, and subsequently divided into East Saint Clair Township and West Saint Clair Township on 18 December 1875. Sometimes one township is considered the successor and the other a new creation, but in their circumstance it appears both East and West were considered new creations with the original township going defunct. The Osterburg Covered Bridge and Snooks Covered Bridge were listed on the National Register of Historic Places in 1980.

== Geography ==
The township is located in northwestern Bedford County. It is bordered to the north by King Township, to the northeast by South Woodbury Township, to the east by Bedford Township, to the southwest by Napier Township, to the west by West St. Clair Township, and at its northernmost point by Lincoln Township. It surrounds but does not include the borough of St. Clairsville.

According to the United States Census Bureau, the township has a total area of 34.1 square miles (88.2 km^{2}), of which 33.9 square miles (87.8 km^{2}) is land and 0.15 square miles (0.4 km^{2}), or 0.45%, is water.

== Demographics ==
Historical population
Census	Pop.	Note	%±
2010	3,048		—
2020	2,908		−4.6%
2023 (est.)	2,889		−0.7%
U.S. Decennial Census

As of the census of 2000, there were 3,123 people, 1,198 households, and 894 families residing in the township. The population density was 92.3 inhabitants per square mile (35.6/km^{2}). There were 1,406 housing units at an average density of 41.5 per square mile (16.0/km^{2}). The racial makeup of the township was 98.43% White, 0.51% African American, 0.03% Native American, 0.67% Asian, 0.10% from other races, and 0.26% from two or more races. Hispanic or Latino of any race were 0.42% of the population.

There were 1,198 households, out of which 35.5% had children under the age of 18 living with them, 61.6% were married couples living together, 9.2% had a female householder with no husband present, and 25.3% were non-families. 22.0% of all households were made up of individuals, and 8.3% had someone living alone who was 65 years of age or older. The average household size was 2.61 and the average family size was 3.04.

In the township the population was spread out, with 26.0% under the age of 18, 8.1% from 18 to 24, 30.8% from 25 to 44, 22.4% from 45 to 64, and 12.6% who were 65 years of age or older. The median age was 36 years. For every 100 females there were 102.0 males. For every 100 females age 18 and over, there were 98.3 males.

The median income for a household in the township was $34,847, and the median income for a family was $38,429. Males had a median income of $28,776 versus $20,170 for females. The per capita income for the township was $16,211. About 6.6% of families and 8.4% of the population were below the poverty line, including 9.4% of those under age 18 and 9.0% of those age 65 or over.
