= Pennsylvania State Game Lands Number 147 =

Park in the United States

- Location within Pennsylvania Location within the United States
- Location: Blair County
- Nearest city: Altoona
- Coordinates: 40°21′11″N 78°20′8″W
- Area: 6,107 acres (2,471 ha)
- Elevation: 1,585 feet (483 m)
- Max. elevation: 2,656 feet (810 m)
- Min. elevation: 1,360 feet (410 m)
- Owner: Pennsylvania Game Commission
- Website: www.pgc.pa.gov/HuntTrap/StateGameLands/Documents/SGL%20Maps/SGL__147.pdf

The Pennsylvania State Game Lands Number 147 are Pennsylvania State Game Lands in Blair County in Pennsylvania in the United States providing hunting, trapping, bird watching, and other activities.

== Geography ==
Game Lands Number 147 is located on the slopes of Dunning Mountain south of the pass containing the Frankstown Branch of the Juniata River. It consists of four parcels located in Blair, Frankstown, Huston, Taylor, and Woodbury townships. Altoona is located about 7 miles (11 km) northwest of the Game Lands. Canoe Creek State Park is located to the west of the northern end of the Game Lands, Morrison's Cove Memorial Park is located in Martinsburg to the south, Taylor Park is located in Roaring Spring to the southwest, and the Allegheny Portage Railroad National Historic Site is located 9 miles (14 km) west of the Game Lands. Pennsylvania State Game Lands Number 166 is to the north, Number 118 and Number 73 are to the east, Number 41 is to the south, and Pennsylvania State Game Lands Number 198 is to the west.

SGL 147 is drained by the Frankstown Branch of the Juniata River and its tributaries, part of the Susquehanna River watershed. Nearby communities include the boroughs of Hollidaysburg, Martinsburg, Roaring Spring, and Williamsburg, and the unincorporated communities Canoe Creek, Clappertown, East Freedom, East Sharpsburg, Flowing Spring, Franklin Forge, Frankstown, Ganister, Geeseytown, Horrell, Jugtown, Linds Crossing, Loop, McKee, Point View, Reese, Reservoir, Rodman, Royer, Springfield Junction, St. Clair, Upper Reese, and Wertz.

Pennsylvania Route 866 is north/south oriented near the east side of the Game Lands from north of Williamsburg and runs through Martinsburg, intersecting with Pennsylvania Route 164 which touches the northern boundary of the southernmost parcel. Route 164 intersects with the highway carrying Interstate 99 and U.S. Route 220 to the west of the Game Lands. U.S. Route 22 runs through Hollidaysburg and crosses through the Frankstown Branch water gap between SGL 147 and SGL 166. Pennsylvania Route 36 also intersects with Route 164 in Roaring Spring.

== Statistics ==
SGL 147 was entered into the Geographic Names Information System on 2 August 1979 as identification number 1188451, listing the elevation as 1,867 feet (569 m). It consists of a total of 6,133 acres (2,482 ha) in three parcels. Elevations range from 860 feet (260 m) on the northeast slope to 2,360 feet (720 m) in the main parcel.

== Biology ==
The Game Lands is dominated by deciduous and coniferous forest, with streams, herbaceous and unvegetated areas, 96.1% forested mostly hardwoods including oaks, also including mountain boulder fields. Hunting, trapping and furtaking opportunities include bear (Ursus americanus), Coyote (Canis latrans), Mourning dove (Zenaida macroura), deer (Odocoileus virgianus), Ruffed grouse (Bonasa umbellus), opossum (Didelphis virginiana), Common pheasant (Phasianus colchicus), rabbit (Sylvilgus floridanus), Raccoon (Procyon lotor), squirrel (Sciurus carolinensis), and turkey (Meleagris gallopavo). Birdwatching species of interest include Broad-winged hawk (Buteo platypeterus), Scarlet tanager (Piranga olivacea), Wood thrush (Hylocichla mustelina), Black-throated green warbler (Setophaga virens), Cerulean warbler (Setophaga cerulea), Worm-eating warbler (Helmitheros vermivorum), and Louisiana waterthrush (Parkesia motacilla).

== See also ==
- Pennsylvania State Game Lands
- Pennsylvania State Game Lands Number 26, also located in Blair County
- Pennsylvania State Game Lands Number 60, also located in Blair County
- Pennsylvania State Game Lands Number 73, also located in Blair County
- Pennsylvania State Game Lands Number 108, also located in Blair County
- Pennsylvania State Game Lands Number 118, also located in Blair County
- Pennsylvania State Game Lands Number 158, also located in Blair County
- Pennsylvania State Game Lands Number 166, also located in Blair and Huntingdon Counties
