= Pennsylvania State Game Lands Number 118 =

Park in the United States

- Location within Pennsylvania Location within the United States
- Location: Blair County; Huntingdon County
- Nearest town: Alexandria; Huntingdon; Marklesburg; Williamsburg
- Coordinates: 40°28′13″N 78°8′58″W
- Area: 6,133 acres (2,482 ha)
- Elevation: 1,867 feet (569 m)
- Max. elevation: 2,656 feet (810 m)
- Min. elevation: 1,360 feet (410 m)
- Owner: Pennsylvania Game Commission

The Pennsylvania State Game Lands Number 118 are Pennsylvania State Game Lands in Blair and Huntingdon counties in Pennsylvania in the United States, providing hunting, bird watching, and other activities.

== Geography ==
Game Lands Number 118 runs along the ridge of Tussey Mountain and extends down the slopes on either side to Morrisons Cove to the west and Woodcock Valley to the east. It consists of three parcels located in Catharine and Woodbury townships in Blair County, and in Penn, Porter and Walker townships in Huntingdon County. Canoe Creek State Park is located about 6 miles (10 km) to the west, Trough Creek State Park is located about 7 miles (11 km) to the southeast, Raystown Lake is located about 7 miles (11 km) to the east, and Rothrock State Forest is located adjacent to SGL 118 to the north. Other nearby Pennsylvania State Game Lands include Number 322 to the east, 71 and 99 to the southeast, 67 to the south, 73 to the southwest adjacent to SGL 67, and 147 and 166 to the west.

The northwest slopes are drained by the Frankstown Branch Juniata River and its tributaries, and the Woodcock Valley side is drained by the Raystown Branch Juniata River, including Raystown Lake and tributaries. Both branches lead to the Juniata River, which is part of the Susquehanna River watershed. Nearby communities include the boroughs of Alexandria, Huntingdon, Marklesburg, and Williamsburg, and unincorporated places Alfarata, Barree, Blairfour, Carlim, Cove Forge, Fisherville, Hesston, Larke, McConnellstown, Mount Etna, Robeson Extension, Shaffersville, Shelltown, Shellytown, Water Street, and Yellow Springs.

U.S. Route 22 runs northeast on the east side of SGL 118, turns southeast at the junction with Pennsylvania Route 45 in Water Street, then passes through the water gap just northwest of Alexandria at the northern border of SGL 118. Pennsylvania Route 453 meets Route 45 just north of the 22\45 intersection. Pennsylvania Route 26 runs northeast–southwest along the eastern side of the Game Lands and meets with US 22 just west of Huntingdon.

== Statistics ==
SGL 118 was entered into the Geographic Names Information System on 2 August 1979 as identification number 1188436, listing the elevation as 1,867 feet (569 m). It consists of a total of 6,133 acres (2,482 ha) in three parcels. Elevations range from 860 feet (260 m) on the northeast slope to 2,360 feet (720 m) in the main parcel.

== Biology ==
Hunting, furtaking and trapping species include deer (Odocoileus virginianus), Ruffed grouse (Bonasa umbellus), squirrel (Sciurus carolinensis), and turkey (Meleagris gallopavo).

== See also ==
- Pennsylvania State Game Lands
- Pennsylvania State Game Lands Number 26, also located in Blair County
- Pennsylvania State Game Lands Number 41, also located in Blair County
- Pennsylvania State Game Lands Number 60, also located in Blair County
- Pennsylvania State Game Lands Number 73, also located in Blair and Huntingdon Counties
- Pennsylvania State Game Lands Number 108, also located in Blair County
- Pennsylvania State Game Lands Number 147, also located in Blair County
- Pennsylvania State Game Lands Number 158, also located in Blair County
- Pennsylvania State Game Lands Number 166, also located in Blair and Huntingdon Counties
