= St. Clair, Blair County, Pennsylvania =

Unincorporated community in Pennsylvania, US

St. Clair, Pennsylvania
- Census-designated place
- Location within Pennsylvania Location within the United States
- Coordinates: 40°28′42″N 78°13′42″W
- Country: United States
- State: Pennsylvania
- County: Blair
- Township: Catharine

Area
  - Total: 0.031 sq mi (0.08 km^{2})
  - Land: 0.031 sq mi (0.08 km^{2})
  - Water: 0 sq mi (0.0 km^{2})
- Elevation: 876 ft (267 m)
- Time zone: UTC-5 (Eastern (EST))
  - Summer (DST): UTC-4 (EDT)
- ZIP Code: 16693 (Williamsburg)
- Area codes: 814/582
- FIPS code: 42-67220
- GNIS feature ID: 2805565

St. Clair is an unincorporated community and census-designated place (CDP) in Blair County, Pennsylvania, United States. It was first listed as a CDP prior to the 2020 census.

The CDP is in eastern Blair County, in the southern part of Catharine Township. It is bordered to the southwest by the Frankstown Branch of the Juniata River, which forms the border with Woodbury Township to the south. Pennsylvania Route 866 passes through St. Clair, leading southeast 2 miles (3 km) to Williamsburg and northwest 1.5 miles (2.4 km) to U.S. Route 22 near Point View.

St. Clair sits at the southern base of Short Mountain, which rises 900 feet (270 m) above the community to an elevation of 1,790 feet (550 m).

== Education ==
It is in the Williamsburg Community School District.
