= Beavertown, Blair County, Pennsylvania =

Unincorporated community in Pennsylvania, US

Beavertown, Pennsylvania
- Census-designated place
- Location within Pennsylvania Location within the United States
- Coordinates: 40°22′28″N 78°14′11″W
- Country: United States
- State: Pennsylvania
- County: Blair
- Township: Huston

Area
  - Total: 0.062 sq mi (0.16 km^{2})
  - Land: 0.062 sq mi (0.16 km^{2})
  - Water: 0 sq mi (0.00 km^{2})
- Elevation: 1,148 ft (350 m)

Population (2020)
  - Total: 40
  - Density: 640/sq mi (246/km^{2})
- Time zone: UTC-5 (Eastern (EST))
  - Summer (DST): UTC-4 (EDT)
- ZIP Codes: 16662 (Martinsburg); 16693 (Williamsburg)
- Area codes: 814/582
- FIPS code: 42-04832
- GNIS feature ID: 2805466

Beavertown is an unincorporated community and census-designated place (CDP) in Blair County, Pennsylvania, United States. It was first listed as a CDP prior to the 2020 census.

== Geography ==
The CDP is in southeastern Blair County, in the northeastern part of Huston Township. It is in the Morrisons Cove region of the county, on the west side of Clover Creek, between Tussey Mountain to the east and a lower, unnamed ridge to the west. Clover Creek is a northward-flowing tributary of the Frankstown Branch of the Juniata River, part of the Susquehanna River watershed.

Beavertown is along Clover Creek Road, which leads north 7 miles (11 km) to Williamsburg and south 5 miles (8 km) to Pennsylvania Route 164 at a point 2 miles (3 km) east of Martinsburg.

== Demographics ==
Historical population
Census	Pop.	Note	%±
2020	40		—
U.S. Decennial Census

== Education ==
It is in the Spring Cove School District.
