= Pennsylvania State Game Lands Number 166 =

Park in the United States

- Location within Pennsylvania Location within the United States
- Location: Blair County; Huntingdon County
- Nearest city: Altoona
- Coordinates: 40°32′37″N 78°13′43″W; 40°30′54″N 78°18′7″W; 40°33′36″N 78°18′7″W
- Area: 11,851 acres (4,796 ha)
- Elevation: 1,211 feet (369 m)
- Max. elevation: 2,422 feet (738 m)
- Min. elevation: 1,000 feet (300 m)
- Owner: Pennsylvania Game Commission
- Website: www.pgc.pa.gov/HuntTrap/StateGameLands/Documents/SGL%20Maps/SGL__166.pdf

The Pennsylvania State Game Lands Number 166 are Pennsylvania State Game Lands in Blair and Huntingdon Counties in Pennsylvania in the United States providing hunting, trapping, bird watching, and other activities.

== Geography ==
Pennsylvania State Game Lands Number 166 is located on Brush Mountain and Canoe Mountain in Catharine, Frankstown and Tyrone townships in Blair County, and in Morris Township in Huntingdon County.

Canoe Creek State Park is located immediately to the southwest of the main parcel, and Rothrock State Forest is located to the northeast. Pennsylvania State Game Lands Number 131 is located to the north, Pennsylvania State Game Lands Number 322 is located to the east, Pennsylvania State Game Lands Number 118 is to the southeast, Pennsylvania State Game Lands Number 147 is to the south, Pennsylvania State Game Lands Number 198 is locate to the southeast, Pennsylvania State Game Lands Number 267, Pennsylvania State Game Lands Number 108, and Pennsylvania State Game Lands Number 158 are located to the northwest.

The western slope of the western parcel drains into tributaries of the Little Juniata River, the eastern slope of the parcel, the southwestern parcel, and the western slope of the main parcel drains into Sinking Run, which also runs to the Little Juniata further downstream. The portion of the main parcel on the eastern slope of Brush Mountain and the western slope of Canoe Mountain drain into Canoe Creek which runs to the Frankstown Branch Juniata River, and finally, the portion of the main parcel on the east slope of Canoe Mountain drains into tributaries of the Frankstown Branch. All are part of the Juniata River watershed, ultimately the Susquehanna River watershed.

Nearby communities include the city of Altoona, the borough of Bellwood, and populated places Canoe Creek, Culp, Elberta, Greenwood, Pinecroft, Point View, Shaffersville, Sickles Corner, and Yellow Springs.

The highway carrying Interstate 99 and U.S. Route 220 runs northeast/southwest to the west of the Game Lands, U.S. Route 22 also, runs northwest/southeast, but to the east, and the highway carrying Pennsylvania Route 45 and Pennsylvania Route 453 runs northwest/southeast to the north of the Game Lands.

== Statistics ==
SGL 166 was entered into the Geographic Names Information System on 2 August 1979 as identification number 1188465, listing the elevation as 1,211 feet (369 m). It consists of a total of 11,851 acres (4,796 ha) in three parcels. Elevations range from 1,000 feet (300 m) on the northeast slope to 2,422 feet (738 m).

== Biology ==
Hunting, trapping and furtaking opportunities include deer (Odocoileus virgianus), Ruffed grouse (Bonasa umbellus), squirrel (Sciurus carolinensis), and turkey (Meleagris gallopavo).

== See also ==
- Pennsylvania State Game Lands
- Pennsylvania State Game Lands Number 26, also located in Blair and Cambria Counties
- Pennsylvania State Game Lands Number 60, also located in Blair and Cambria Counties
- Pennsylvania State Game Lands Number 73, also located in Blair County
- Pennsylvania State Game Lands Number 108, also located in Blair and Cambria Counties
- Pennsylvania State Game Lands Number 118, also located in Blair County
- Pennsylvania State Game Lands Number 147, also located in Blair County
