= Robeson Extension, Pennsylvania =

Unincorporated community in Pennsylvania, US

- Census-designated place
- Location within Pennsylvania Location within the United States
- Coordinates: 40°28′02″N 78°11′59″W
- Country: United States
- State: Pennsylvania
- County: Blair
- Township: Catharine

Area
  - Total: 0.17 sq mi (0.45 km^{2})
  - Land: 0.17 sq mi (0.45 km^{2})
  - Water: 0 sq mi (0.00 km^{2})
- Elevation: 856 ft (261 m)

Population (2020)
  - Total: 217
  - Density: 1,247.0/sq mi (481.48/km^{2})
- Time zone: UTC-5 (Eastern (EST))
  - Summer (DST): UTC-4 (EDT)
- ZIP Code: 16693 (Williamsburg)
- Area codes: 814/582
- FIPS code: 42-65328
- GNIS feature ID: 2805552

Robeson Extension is an unincorporated community and census-designated place (CDP) in Blair County, Pennsylvania, United States. It was first listed as a CDP prior to the 2020 census.

The CDP is in eastern Blair County, on the southern border of Catharine Township. It sits within a bend of the Frankstown Branch Juniata River, which borders to the community to the east, south, and west. Across the river are Woodbury Township and the borough of Williamsburg. High Street leads from Robeson Extension south across the Frankstown Branch into Williamsburg. To the north, High Street becomes Yellow Springs Drive, which leads north 4 miles (6 km) to U.S. Route 22 at Yellow Springs.

== Demographics ==
Historical population
Census	Pop.	Note	%±
2020	217		—
U.S. Decennial Census

== Education ==
It is in the Williamsburg Community School District.
