= Shelltown =

Shelltown is the name of several places in the United States:

- Shelltown, San Diego, California, a neighborhood
- Shelltown, Maryland, an unincorporated community
- Shelltown, Pennsylvania, a census-designated place

== See also ==
- Snelltown, Maryland
- Shellytown, Pennsylvania
