= Snare Run =

Coordinates: 40°28′25″N 78°10′17″W

Snare Run is a 1.6-mile-long (2.6 km) tributary of the lower reaches of Clover Creek in Pennsylvania in the United States. Via Clover Creek, its waters flow to the Frankstown Branch Juniata River, the Juniata River itself, the Susquehanna River, and eventually Chesapeake Bay.

Snare Run once contained a reservoir for the borough of Williamsburg - it is no longer used.

== See also ==
- List of rivers of Pennsylvania
