= Franklin Forge, Pennsylvania =

Unincorporated community in Pennsylvania, US

- Census-designated place
- Location within Pennsylvania Location within the United States
- Coordinates: 40°28′16″N 78°13′57″W
- Country: United States
- State: Pennsylvania
- County: Blair
- Township: Woodbury

Area
  - Total: 0.023 sq mi (0.06 km^{2})
  - Land: 0.023 sq mi (0.06 km^{2})
  - Water: 0 sq mi (0.00 km^{2})
- Elevation: 990 ft (300 m)

Population (2020)
  - Total: 14
  - Density: 617.1/sq mi (238.28/km^{2})
- Time zone: UTC-5 (Eastern (EST))
  - Summer (DST): UTC-4 (EDT)
- ZIP Code: 16693 (Williamsburg)
- Area codes: 814/582
- FIPS code: 42-27517
- GNIS feature ID: 2805500

Franklin Forge is a census-designated place (CDP) in Blair County, Pennsylvania, United States. It was first listed as a CDP prior to the 2020 census.

The CDP is in eastern Blair County, in the northwestern part of Woodbury Township. It is bordered to the northwest by Piney Creek, just upstream from the creek's confluence with the Frankstown Branch Juniata River at Ganister. Wertz Road forms the northern boundary of the CDP, and Krajacic Lane is the western boundary. The community is 2 miles (3 km) west of Williamsburg and 11 miles (18 km) by road northeast of Hollidaysburg.

== Demographics ==
Historical population
Census	Pop.	Note	%±
2020	14		—
U.S. Decennial Census

== Education ==
It is in the Williamsburg Community School District.
