= Clappertown, Pennsylvania =

Unincorporated community in Pennsylvania, US

- Census-designated place
- Location within Pennsylvania Location within the United States
- Coordinates: 40°24′10″N 78°16′32″W
- Country: United States
- State: Pennsylvania
- County: Blair
- Township: Huston

Area
  - Total: 0.34 sq mi (0.89 km^{2})
  - Land: 0.34 sq mi (0.89 km^{2})
  - Water: 0 sq mi (0.00 km^{2})
- Elevation: 1,130 ft (340 m)

Population (2020)
  - Total: 98
  - Density: 286.6/sq mi (110.67/km^{2})
- Time zone: UTC-5 (Eastern (EST))
  - Summer (DST): UTC-4 (EDT)
- ZIP Code: 16693 (Williamsburg)
- Area codes: 814/582
- FIPS code: 42-13728
- GNIS feature ID: 2805475

Clappertown is an unincorporated community and census-designated place (CDP) in Blair County, Pennsylvania, United States. It was first listed as a CDP before the 2020 census.

== Geography ==
The CDP is in eastern Blair County, in the northwestern part of Huston Township. It is in the Morrisons Cove region of the county, in the valley of Piney Creek, which flows north to the Frankstown Branch of the Juniata River at Ganister, part of the Susquehanna River watershed. Lock Mountain rises to an elevation of 2,007 feet (612 m) just west of Clappertown.

Pennsylvania Route 866 passes through the community, leading northeast 6 miles (10 km) to Wiliamsburg on the Frankstown Branch, and south-southeast 7 miles (11 km) to Martinsburg.

== Demographics ==
Historical population
Census	Pop.	Note	%±
2020	98		—
U.S. Decennial Census

== Education ==
It is in the Spring Cove School District.
