= Fisherville, Blair County, Pennsylvania =

Unincorporated community in Pennsylvania, US

Fisherville, Pennsylvania
- Census-designated place
- Location within Pennsylvania Location within the United States
- Coordinates: 40°28′21″N 78°10′11″W
- Country: United States
- State: Pennsylvania
- County: Blair
- Township: Woodbury

Area
  - Total: 0.050 sq mi (0.13 km^{2})
  - Land: 0.050 sq mi (0.13 km^{2})
  - Water: 0 sq mi (0.00 km^{2})
- Elevation: 915 ft (279 m)

Population (2020)
  - Total: 15
  - Density: 300/sq mi (115.7/km^{2})
- Time zone: UTC-5 (Eastern (EST))
  - Summer (DST): UTC-4 (EDT)
- ZIP Code: 16693 (Williamsburg)
- Area codes: 814/582
- FIPS code: 42-26036
- GNIS feature ID: 2805496

Fisherville is an unincorporated community and census-designated place (CDP) in Blair County, Pennsylvania, United States. It was first listed as a CDP prior to the 2020 census.

== Geography ==
The CDP is in eastern Blair County, in the northeastern part of Woodbury Township. It is bordered to the west, across Clover Creek, by the community of Cove Forge. Shultz Road is the only through road in Fisherville, leading north to Cove Forge and south up Clover Creek towards Larke. The borough of Williamsburg is 2 miles (3 km) to the west.

== Demographics ==
Historical population
Census	Pop.	Note	%±
2020	15		—
U.S. Decennial Census

== Education ==
It is in the Williamsburg Community School District.
