= Oreminea, Pennsylvania =

Unincorporated community in Pennsylvania, US

- Census-designated place
- Location within Pennsylvania Location within the United States
- Coordinates: 40°24′14″N 78°15′14″W
- Country: United States
- State: Pennsylvania
- County: Blair
- Township: Huston

Area
  - Total: 0.36 sq mi (0.93 km^{2})
  - Land: 0.36 sq mi (0.93 km^{2})
  - Water: 0 sq mi (0.00 km^{2})
- Elevation: 1,402 ft (427 m)

Population (2020)
  - Total: 62
  - Density: 171.8/sq mi (66.35/km^{2})
- Time zone: UTC-5 (Eastern (EST))
  - Summer (DST): UTC-4 (EDT)
- ZIP Code: 16693 (Williamsburg)
- Area codes: 814/582
- FIPS code: 42-57040
- GNIS feature ID: 2805538

Oreminea is an unincorporated community and census-designated place (CDP) in Blair County, Pennsylvania, United States. It was first listed as a CDP prior to the 2020 census.

The CDP is in eastern Blair County, in the northern part of Huston Township. It is 1 mile (1.6 km) east of Clappertown and 6 miles (10 km) southwest of Williamsburg.

== Demographics ==
Historical population
Census	Pop.	Note	%±
2020	62		—
U.S. Decennial Census

== Education ==
It is in the Spring Cove School District.
