= Lower Trail =

Rail trail in Pennsylvania, United States

- Length: 16.5 mi (26.6 km)
- Location: Blair County, Pennsylvania
- Designation: National Recreation Trail
- Trailheads: Flowing Springs; Alfarata
- Use: Cycling, Running, Hiking, Bird-watching, Cross-Country Skiing, and Horseback Riding
- Grade: 0.2%
- Difficulty: Easy, ADA accessible
- Season: Year-round
- Surface: Smooth crushed stone
- Right of way: Pennsylvania Railroad

The Lower Trail (/'laʊ.ər/, rhymes with "flower") is a 16.5-mile (26.6 km) rail trail that follows the Juniata River in West-Central Pennsylvania from Flowing Springs in Blair County to Alfarata in Huntingdon County. The Lower Trail is owned and maintained by Rails to Trails of Central Pennsylvania, a 501(c)(3) organization. The trail follows the path of the former Pennsylvania Railroad Petersburg Branch along the Frankstown Branch of the Juniata River. It is open free of charge to the public, though donations are accepted at all trailheads. The portion of the Lower Trail from Alfarata to Williamsburg is part of the Pennsylvania Mid State Trail and Great Eastern Trail. In 2009, the trail was designated as a National Recreation Trail by the United States Department of the Interior.

== Development ==
=== Historical significance ===
Much of the trail was the original towpath for the Pennsylvania Canal that operated in the early 1800s and was known as the "continuous waterways" which linked Pittsburgh and Philadelphia. By the 1850s, area canals became obsolete due to the rise of the Pennsylvania Railroad and its passage through the Allegheny Mountains via the Horseshoe Curve. The Pennsylvania Railroad and other local railroads then developed branch lines along much of the towpaths.

=== History and evolution ===
Much of the Lower Trail, paralleling the Frankstown Branch of the Juniata River, was part of the original towpath of the Pennsylvania Main Line Canal which operated in the mid-1800s. Following the end of the canal era, the Pennsylvania Railroad took over the property and developed the Petersburg Branch of the PRR on this alignment. In 1979, the rail corridor was abandoned. Over the next 8 years, the rails were sold for scrap and the corridor put up for sale. In 1989, Rails to Trails of Central Pennsylvania Inc. purchased the first eleven miles of the Lower Trail from Williamsburg to Alfarata from the Penn Central Corp. It was purchased due to the private donation of a Hollidaysburg attorney, T. Dean Lower. The trail was named in honor of Lower's late wife. The trail extension, from Williamsburg to Canoe Creek, was purchased by an anonymous donation for the land in 1994. State and federal funding assisted in the construction of the trail.

== Trail membership organization ==
The Lower Trail is owned and maintained by the non-profit organization Rails to Trails of Central Pennsylvania. The organization is sustained by its membership, which is open to any member of the public. As of 2019, there were approximately 375 dues paying members. The members elect a fifteen member board of directors who meet monthly to oversee the annual budget, trail maintenance, operations and development. The current president of the Board of Directors is Adam Bergstein, and the vice president is Michael Panek.

== Maintenance ==
Trail maintenance is performed by a dedicated group of volunteers who give their time to ensure the trail is in good condition during all four seasons. Maintenance is funded by membership dues, donations, and state and local grants.

== Canoe Creek Extension ==
In fall of 2019, an extension of the trail will open that connects the Flowing Spring trailhead into Canoe Creek State Park. The extension includes an underpass that sends the trail underneath US Route 22, so trail users do not have to cross over the roadway. The project was made possible with a large grant from the Pennsylvania Department of Transportation, County of Blair and Frankstown Township Supervisors.

== Trail access points ==
The Lower Trail has six primary trailheads. All trailheads have parking and picnic tables available.

Trailhead	Coordinates	Elevation (ft / m)
Flowing Springs Station	N 40° 28.371' W 078° 16.050'	880 / 270
Ganister Station	N 40° 33.995' W 078° 07.282'	728 / 222
Williamsburg Station	N 40° 31.234' W 078° 10.304'	798 / 243
Cove Dale Station	N 40° 29.228' W 078° 10.188'	830 / 250
Mt. Etna Station	N 40° 27.713' W 078° 11.908'	844 / 257
Alfarata Station	N 40° 28.426' W 078° 13.614'	865 / 264

== See also ==
- List of rail trails in Pennsylvania
- Rails-to-Trails Conservancy
