= Ganister, Pennsylvania =

Unincorporated community in Pennsylvania, US

- Census-designated place
- Location within Pennsylvania Location within the United States
- Coordinates: 40°28′25″N 78°13′36″W
- Country: United States
- State: Pennsylvania
- County: Blair
- Township: Woodbury

Area
  - Total: 0.015 sq mi (0.04 km^{2})
  - Land: 0.015 sq mi (0.04 km^{2})
  - Water: 0 sq mi (0.00 km^{2})
- Elevation: 876 ft (267 m)

Population (2020)
  - Total: 11
  - Density: 784.3/sq mi (302.81/km^{2})
- Time zone: UTC-5 (Eastern (EST))
  - Summer (DST): UTC-4 (EDT)
- ZIP Code: 16693 (Williamsburg)
- Area codes: 814/582
- FIPS code: 42-28360
- GNIS feature ID: 2805505

Ganister is an unincorporated community and census-designated place (CDP) in Blair County, Pennsylvania, United States. It was first listed as a CDP prior to the 2020 census.

== Geography ==
The CDP is in eastern Blair County, in the northwestern part of Woodbury Township. It is bordered to the north by the Frankstown Branch Juniata River and to the west by its tributary, Piney Creek. Catharine Township is to the north across the Frankstown Branch.

Pennsylvania Route 866 forms the northeastern border of the Ganister CDP; it leads southeast (downriver) 2 miles (3 km) to Williamsburg and northwest, upriver through the Lock Mountain / Short Mountain water gap, 2 miles (3 km) to U.S. Route 22 near Point View.

The limestone quarry in Ganister is currently owned by Grannas Brothers, Inc.

== Demographics ==
Historical population
Census	Pop.	Note	%±
2020	11		—
U.S. Decennial Census

== Education ==
It is in the Williamsburg Community School District.
