= Shellytown, Pennsylvania =

Unincorporated community in Pennsylvania, US

- Census-designated place
- Location within Pennsylvania Location within the United States
- Coordinates: 40°24′33″N 78°12′38″W
- Country: United States
- State: Pennsylvania
- County: Blair
- Township: Woodbury

Area
  - Total: 0.14 sq mi (0.35 km^{2})
  - Land: 0.14 sq mi (0.35 km^{2})
  - Water: 0 sq mi (0.0 km^{2})
- Elevation: 1,060 ft (320 m)
- Time zone: UTC-5 (Eastern (EST))
  - Summer (DST): UTC-4 (EDT)
- ZIP Code: 16693 (Williamsburg)
- Area codes: 814/582
- FIPS code: 42-70032
- GNIS feature ID: 2805560

Shellytown is an unincorporated community and census-designated place (CDP) in Blair County, Pennsylvania, United States. It was first listed as a CDP prior to the 2020 census.

The CDP is in eastern Blair County, in the southeastern part of Woodbury Township. It is bordered to the west by Clover Creek, a north-flowing tributary of the Frankstown Branch Juniata River. Clover Creek Road is the main street in the community, leading north 4 miles (6 km) to Williamsburg and southwest 8 miles (13 km) to Fredericksburg.

== Education ==
It is in the Williamsburg Community School District.
