= Morrisons Cove =

Valley in Pennsylvania, United States

Coordinates: 40.249245°N 78.335847°W

Morrisons Cove (also referred to as Morrison Cove or Morrison's Cove), is an eroded anticlinal valley in Blair and Bedford counties of central Pennsylvania, United States, extending from Evitts Mountain near New Enterprise, north to the Frankstown Branch Juniata River at Williamsburg. The width of the valley varies from 10 to 15 miles (16 to 24 km) between Tussey Mountain on the east to the chain of Dunning, Loop and Lock Mountains on the west. Almost entirely enclosed by these mountains, the only openings in the cove are at Loysburg Gap in the south, McKee Gap in the west, and at Williamsburg to the north. The floor of the valley is mostly level, with many large fertile farm fields. The southern end of the valley drains to the Raystown Branch Juniata River via Yellow Creek through Loysburg Gap, and the northern end drains to the Frankstown Branch, via Clover Creek.

There are four boroughs and seven townships located in Morrisons Cove:

- Roaring Spring
- Martinsburg
- Williamsburg
- Woodbury
- South Woodbury Township, Bedford County
- Woodbury Township, Bedford County
- Bloomfield Township, Bedford County
- Taylor Township, Blair County
- North Woodbury Township, Blair County
- Huston Township, Blair County
- Woodbury Township, Blair County

Altoona–Blair County Airport is located in Morrisons Cove. Pennsylvania Route 36 is the main north/south route through the valley from Loysburg Gap to McKee Gap. Pennsylvania Route 866 branches off PA-36 at Woodbury to Martinsburg.

== History ==
Morrisons Cove is often mentioned as a landmark in early wills and records of importance. Wills Creek Valley and Friend's Cove are also in this section of the state and were well known to the early settlers.

=== Tornado ===
On May 22, 1949, the same storm system that caused the F1 tornado in Altoona also spawned an F1 tornado in the Morrisons Cove area. The tornado initially touched down south of Curryville where it downed several large trees and destroyed a barn. The tornado moved northeast, striking Henrietta and Millerstown. Several homes were unroofed and barns were destroyed, in both areas. One of the destroyed barns was a 150-year-old stone barn. Near Henrietta, a three-hundred-foot (91 m) long chicken house was thrown a considerable distance before being destroyed. A car was destroyed and a church had several windows blown out and had its chimney ripped off. A 17-year-old girl was injured in Henrietta, when the window she was standing at shattered. The tornado dissipated about one mile (1.6 km) east of Martinsburg in the Clover Creek/Fredericksburg area where it downed several willow trees. The damage caused by this tornado is consistent of winds 105–110 mph (169–177 km/h).

A map made by Dr. Ted Fujita in 1974, of all of the tornadoes in the U.S between 1930 and 1974, shows this tornado as an F1 on the Fujita Scale.
