= Larke, Pennsylvania =

Unincorporated community in Pennsylvania, US

- Census-designated place
- Location within Pennsylvania Location within the United States
- Coordinates: 40°25′30″N 78°12′31″W
- Country: United States
- State: Pennsylvania
- County: Blair
- Township: Woodbury

Area
  - Total: 0.15 sq mi (0.40 km^{2})
  - Land: 0.15 sq mi (0.40 km^{2})
  - Water: 0 sq mi (0.00 km^{2})
- Elevation: 1,027 ft (313 m)

Population (2020)
  - Total: 40
  - Density: 257.1/sq mi (99.25/km^{2})
- Time zone: UTC-5 (Eastern (EST))
  - Summer (DST): UTC-4 (EDT)
- ZIP Code: 16693 (Williamsburg)
- Area codes: 814/582
- FIPS code: 42-41580
- GNIS feature ID: 2805517

Larke is an unincorporated community and census-designated place (CDP) in Blair County, Pennsylvania, United States. It was first listed as a CDP prior to the 2020 census.

The CDP is in eastern Blair County, in the southeastern part of Woodbury Township. It sits in the valley of Clover Creek, a northward-flowing tributary of the Frankstown Branch Juniata River. Larke is 2.5 miles (4.0 km) south of Williamsburg by Upper Clover Creek Road.

== Demographics ==
Historical population
Census	Pop.	Note	%±
2020	40		—
U.S. Decennial Census

== Education ==
It is in the Williamsburg Community School District.
