= Catharine Township, Pennsylvania =

Township in Pennsylvania, US

Coordinates: 40°32′00″N 78°14′29″W

- Township
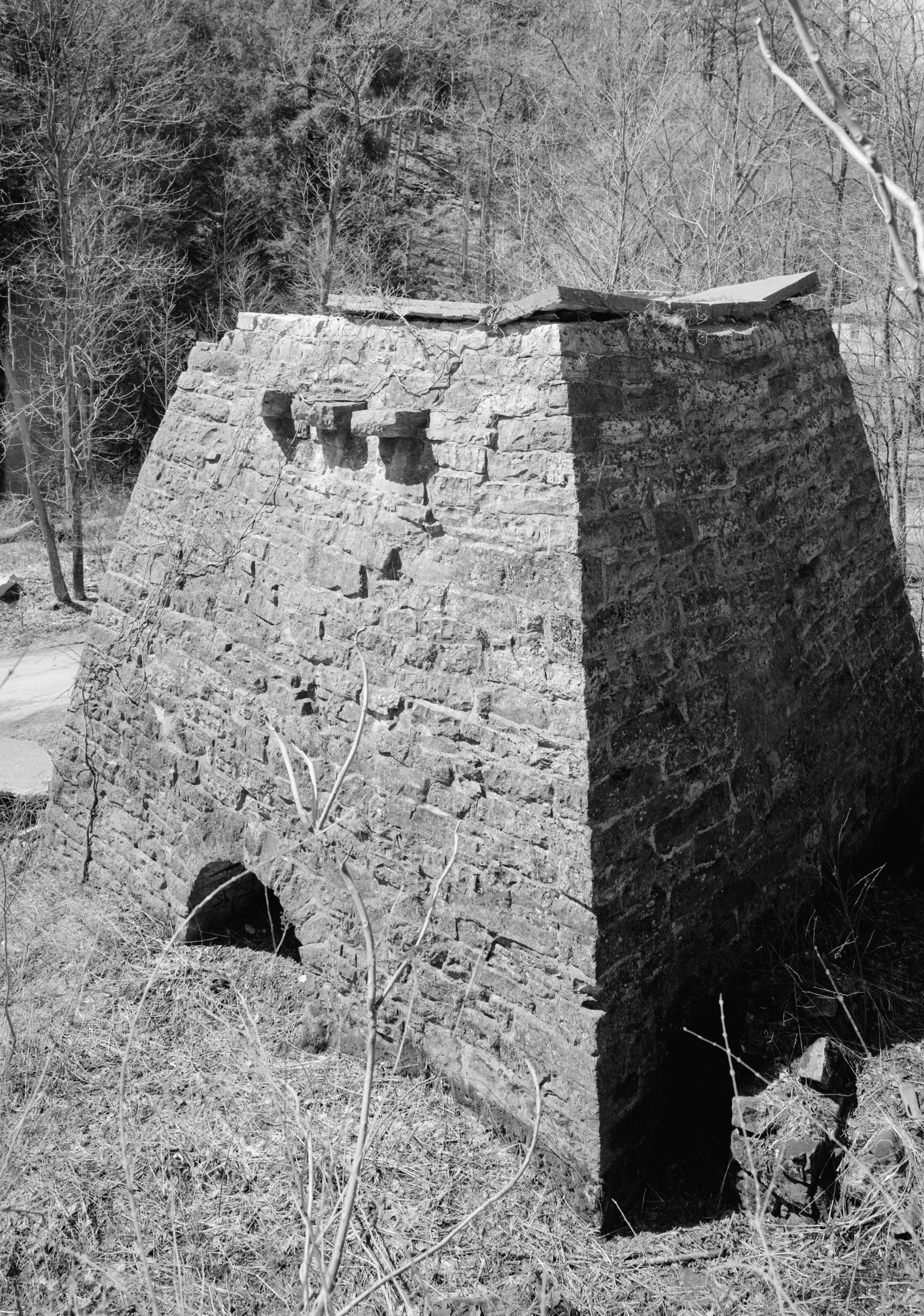
- Etna Furnace, a blast furnace in the township

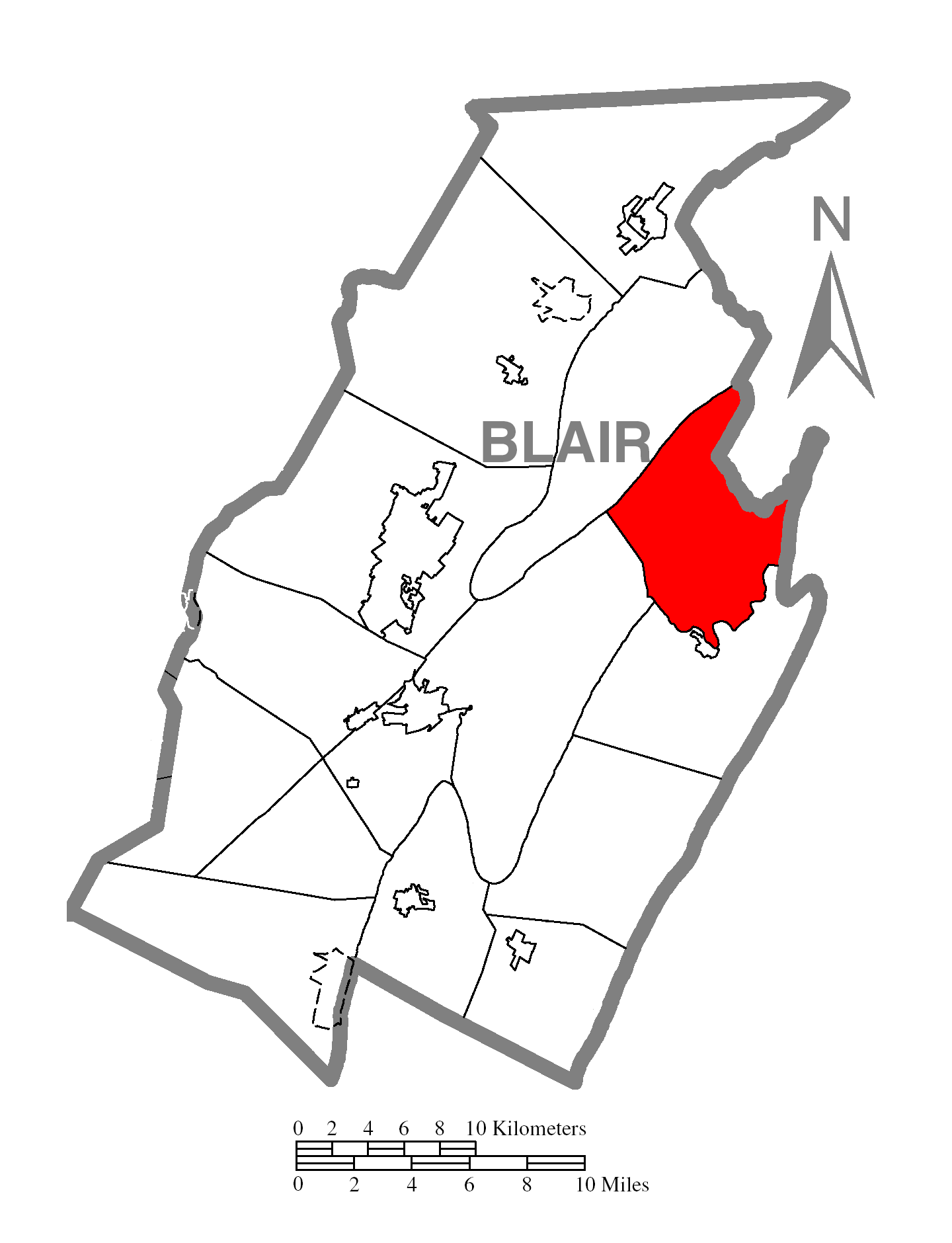
- Map of Blair County, Pennsylvania highlighting Catharine Township

- Map of Blair County, Pennsylvania
- Country: United States
- State: Pennsylvania
- County: Blair
- Settled: 1773
- Incorporated: 1846

Government
  - Type: Board of Supervisors

Area
  - Total: 30.83 sq mi (79.85 km^{2})
  - Land: 30.82 sq mi (79.83 km^{2})
  - Water: 0.012 sq mi (0.03 km^{2})

Population (2020)
  - Total: 773 ▲
  - Estimate (2022): 762
  - Density: 23.0/sq mi (8.88/km^{2})
- Time zone: UTC-5 (Eastern (EST))
  - Summer (DST): UTC-4 (EDT)
- Area code: 814
- FIPS code: 42-013-11760
- Website: www.catharinetownship.org

Catharine Township is a township in Blair County, Pennsylvania, United States. The population was 773 at the 2020 census. It is part of the Altoona, PA Metropolitan Statistical Area.

== History ==
Located in Catharine Township is the Mount Etna Furnace Complex, originally listed on the National Register of Historic Places in 1973 and expanded in 1991.

== Geography ==
Catharine Township is in eastern Blair County. It is bordered to the south by Woodbury Township and the borough of Williamsburg, to the southwest by Frankstown Township, to the northwest by Tyrone Township, to the north by Morris Township in Huntingdon County, and to the east by Porter Township in Huntingdon County. Unincorporated communities in the township include Yellow Springs, Point View, St. Clair, and Robeson Extension.

The township's southern border and part of its northern border are formed by the Frankstown Branch of the Juniata River. The eastern border follows the crest of Tussey Mountain, part of the northern border follows the crest of Canoe Mountain, and the northwest border follows the crest of Brush Mountain. Most of the settled part of the township occupies Canoe Valley, between Canoe Mountain and Tussey Mountain.

According to the United States Census Bureau, the township has a total area of 30.8 square miles (79.9 km^{2}), of which 0.01 square miles (0.03 km^{2}), or 0.03%, is water.

== Demographics ==
Historical population
Census	Pop.	Note	%±
2010	724		—
2020	773		6.8%
2022 (est.)	762		−1.4%
U.S. Decennial Census

As of the census of 2000, there were 758 people, 294 households, and 224 families residing in the township. The population density was 24.5 people per square mile (9.5/km^{2}). There were 311 housing units at an average density of 10.1/sq mi (3.9/km^{2}). The racial makeup of the township was 98.02% White, 1.06% African American, 0.13% Native American, 0.26% Asian, and 0.53% from two or more races. Hispanic or Latino of any race were 0.66% of the population.

There were 294 households, out of which 29.9% had children under the age of 18 living with them, 67.0% were married couples living together, 6.1% had a female householder with no husband present, and 23.5% were non-families. 19.7% of all households were made up of individuals, and 10.2% had someone living alone who was 65 years of age or older. The average household size was 2.58 and the average family size was 2.96.

In the township the population was spread out, with 23.6% under the age of 18, 7.5% from 18 to 24, 24.7% from 25 to 44, 26.6% from 45 to 64, and 17.5% who were 65 years of age or older. The median age was 42 years. For every 100 females there were 97.4 males. For every 100 females age 18 and over, there were 98.3 males.

The median income for a household in the township was $38,125, and the median income for a family was $41,797. Males had a median income of $31,103 versus $21,797 for females. The per capita income for the township was $18,175. About 6.0% of families and 7.3% of the population were below the poverty line, including 8.0% of those under age 18 and 9.5% of those age 65 or over.

== Recreation ==
A small portion of the Pennsylvania State Game Lands Number 118 is located in the eastern end of the township and a portion of Pennsylvania State Game Lands Number 166 lies on Canoe Mountain at the western end of the township.
