= Williamsburg Historic District =

Williamsburg Historic District may refer to:

- Williamsburg Historic District (Williamsburg, Pennsylvania), listed on the NRHP in Blair County, Pennsylvania
- Williamsburg Historic District (Williamsburg, Virginia), listed on the NRHP in Virginia
