= Shelltown, Pennsylvania =

Unincorporated community in Pennsylvania, US

- Census-designated place
- Location within Pennsylvania Location within the United States
- Coordinates: 40°27′24″N 78°12′24″W
- Country: United States
- State: Pennsylvania
- County: Blair
- Township: Woodbury

Area
  - Total: 0.015 sq mi (0.04 km^{2})
  - Land: 0.015 sq mi (0.04 km^{2})
  - Water: 0 sq mi (0.0 km^{2})
- Elevation: 922 ft (281 m)
- Time zone: UTC-5 (Eastern (EST))
  - Summer (DST): UTC-4 (EDT)
- ZIP Code: 16693 (Williamsburg)
- Area codes: 814/582
- FIPS code: 42-70020
- GNIS feature ID: 2807054

Shelltown is an unincorporated community and census-designated place (CDP) in Blair County, Pennsylvania, United States. It was first listed as a CDP prior to the 2020 census.

The CDP is in eastern Blair County, in the northern part of Woodbury Township. It is bordered to the north by the borough of Williamsburg. Pennsylvania Route 866 passes through the community, leading north into Williamsburg and southwest 12 miles (19 km) to Martinsburg.

== Education ==
It is in the Williamsburg Community School District.
