= Royer, Pennsylvania =

Unincorporated community in Pennsylvania, US

- Census-designated place
- Location within Pennsylvania Location within the United States
- Coordinates: 40°25′20″N 78°16′20″W
- Country: United States
- State: Pennsylvania
- County: Blair
- Township: Woodbury

Area
  - Total: 0.13 sq mi (0.34 km^{2})
  - Land: 0.13 sq mi (0.34 km^{2})
  - Water: 0 sq mi (0.0 km^{2})
- Elevation: 1,083 ft (330 m)
- Time zone: UTC-5 (Eastern (EST))
  - Summer (DST): UTC-4 (EDT)
- ZIP Code: 16693 (Williamsburg)
- Area codes: 814/582
- FIPS code: 42-66568
- GNIS feature ID: 2805555

Royer is an unincorporated community and census-designated place (CDP) in Blair County, Pennsylvania, United States. It was first listed as a CDP prior to the 2020 census.

The CDP is in eastern Blair County, in the southwestern corner of Woodbury Township. It sits in the valley of Piney Creek, a northward-flowing tributary of the Frankstown Branch Juniata River. Pennsylvania Route 866 runs along the eastern edge of the community, leading northeast 5 miles (8 km) to Williamsburg and south-southwest 8 miles (13 km) to Martinsburg.

The Daniel Royer House, listed on the National Register of Historic Places, is in the eastern part of the community.

== Education ==
It is in the Williamsburg Community School District.
