= Jacks Creek (Pennsylvania) =

Watercourse in the United States

Coordinates: 40.5834°N 77.5591°W

Jacks Creek is a 20.0-mile-long (32.2 km) tributary of the Juniata River in central Pennsylvania in the United States.

The creek begins along the outskirts of a small village known as Bannerville.

Jacks Creek joins the Juniata River at Lewistown.

== See also ==
- List of rivers of Pennsylvania
