= Jugtown, Pennsylvania =

Unincorporated community in Pennsylvania, US

- Census-designated place
- Location within Pennsylvania Location within the United States
- Coordinates: 40°20′10″N 78°19′37″W
- Country: United States
- State: Pennsylvania
- County: Blair
- Township: Huston

Area
  - Total: 0.21 km^{2} (0.081 sq mi)
  - Land: 0.21 km^{2} (0.081 sq mi)
  - Water: 0.00 km^{2} (0 sq mi)
- Elevation: 455 m (1,493 ft)

Population (2020)
  - Total: 46
  - Density: 218.77/km^{2} (566.6/sq mi)
- Time zone: UTC-5 (Eastern (EST))
  - Summer (DST): UTC-4 (EDT)
- ZIP Code: 16662 (Martinsburg)
- Area codes: 814/582
- FIPS code: 42-38514
- GNIS feature ID: 2807049

Jugtown is an unincorporated community and census-designated place (CDP) in Blair County, Pennsylvania, United States. It was first listed as a CDP prior to the 2020 census.

The CDP is in southeastern Blair County, in the southwestern corner of Huston Township. It sits at the southern foot of Lock Mountain, part of the western edge of Morrisons Cove. It is 2 miles (3 km) north of Martinsburg and 4 miles (6 km) east of Roaring Spring.

== Demographics ==
Historical population
Census	Pop.	Note	%±
2020	46		—
U.S. Decennial Census

== Education ==
It is in the Spring Cove School District.
