= Cove Forge, Pennsylvania =

Unincorporated community in Pennsylvania, US

- Census-designated place
- Location within Pennsylvania Location within the United States
- Coordinates: 40°28′45″N 78°10′24″W
- Country: United States
- State: Pennsylvania
- County: Blair
- Township: Woodbury

Area
  - Total: 0.31 sq mi (0.79 km^{2})
  - Land: 0.31 sq mi (0.79 km^{2})
  - Water: 0 sq mi (0.00 km^{2})
- Elevation: 820 ft (250 m)

Population (2020)
  - Total: 73
  - Density: 240/sq mi (92/km^{2})
- Time zone: UTC-5 (Eastern (EST))
  - Summer (DST): UTC-4 (EDT)
- ZIP Code: 16693 (Williamsburg)
- Area codes: 814/582
- FIPS code: 42-16590
- GNIS feature ID: 2805480

Cove Forge is a census-designated place (CDP) in Blair County, Pennsylvania, United States. It includes the unincorporated community of Covedale. Cove Forge was first listed as a CDP prior to the 2020 census.

== Geography ==
The CDP is in eastern Blair County, in the northeastern part of Woodbury Township. It is bordered to the southeast by Fisherville, to the northwest by the Frankstown Branch of the Juniata River, and to the east by the west base of Tussey Mountain.

Covedale Road leads southwest (upriver) 2 miles (3 km) to the borough of Williamsburg and east over Tussey Mountain 11 miles (18 km) to Huntingdon.

== Demographics ==
Historical population
Census	Pop.	Note	%±
2020	73		—
U.S. Decennial Census

== Education ==
It is in the Williamsburg Community School District.
