= Buffalo Creek (Juniata River tributary) =

Creek in Pennsylvania, United States

Coordinates: 40°28′30″N 77°12′50″W

Buffalo Creek is a 31.4-mile-long (50.5 km) tributary of the Juniata River in Perry County, Pennsylvania, in the United States.

Buffalo Creek joins the Juniata River at the borough of Newport.

== See also ==
- List of rivers of Pennsylvania
