= Vaughn O. Lang =

American general

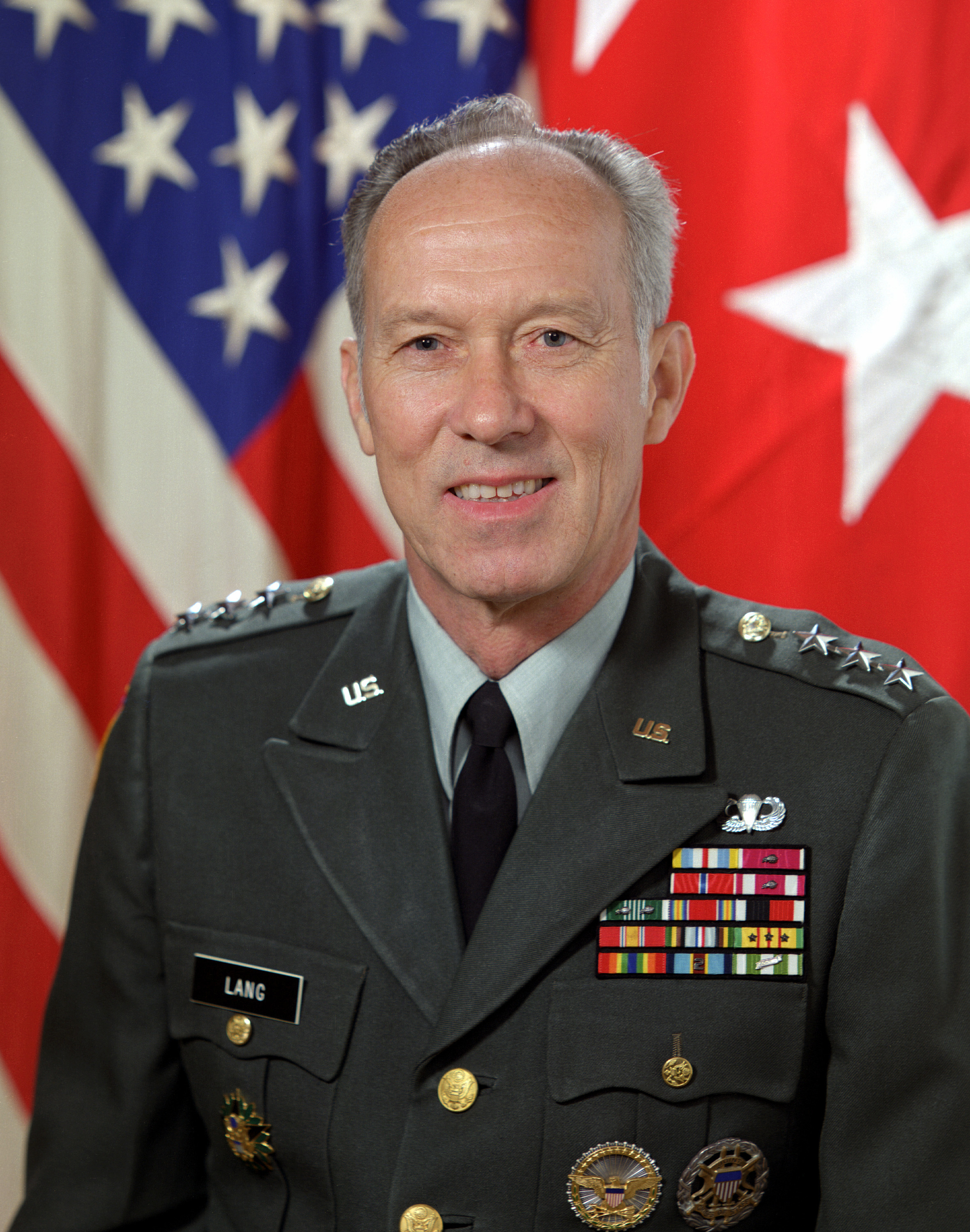
- Lieutenant General Vaughn Lang in 1985
- Born: November 10, 1927; Williamsburg, Pennsylvania
- Died: October 2, 2014 (aged 86); Vienna, Virginia
- Burial place: Williamsburg, Pennsylvania; 40.52209°N 078.20152°W
- Military career
- Allegiance: United States of America
- Branch: United States Army
- Service years: 1952–1988
- Rank: Lieutenant General
- Commands: Communications and Electronic Materiel Readiness Command; Army Communications Agency; 1st Signal Brigade; 39th Signal Battalion; 447th Signal Battalion
- Conflicts: Vietnam War
- Awards: Defense Distinguished Service Medal; Defense Superior Service Medal; Legion of Merit; Bronze Star; Defense Meritorious Service Medal; Meritorious Service Medal; Army Commendation Medal

Vaughn Olin Lang (November 10, 1927 – October 2, 2014) was a lieutenant general in the United States Army.

Vaughn O. Lang began his service as second lieutenant at the Officers' Basic Course at Ft. Monmouth, New Jersey in 1952. His subsequent assignments were as the Commander of Bravo Company and then the S3 for the 50th Signal Battalion. He served as the Signal advisor to the Army of the Republic of Vietnam 21st Infantry Division as part of the MACV. His assignments then began to include those which engaged him in materiel acquisition. He served in the Radio-Radar Procurement Branch and in the European Trans-Atlantic Project. Interspersed in these assignments, Lang was chosen to command at every level. He commanded both 447th Signal Battalion in Europe and the 39th Signal Battalion in Vietnam with his unit commands culminating with the command of the 1st Signal Brigade. He then went on to command the Communications and Electronic Materiel Readiness Command (CERCOM) now part of the United States Army Communications-Electronics Command (CECOM) and the Army Communications Agency. He served as the director of a program devoted to the continuity of our constitutional form of government and to the survival of the Office of the President of the United States.

After retirement he was one of the initial Board of Directors of the 1st Signal Brigade Association and was recognised as a Distinguished Member of the Signal Regiment in a ceremony held December 3, 2008. Distinguished Members of the Regiment are prestigious or notable military or civilian persons who are recognized for their accomplishments.

General Lang died on October 2, 2014, at his home in Vienna, Virginia, aged 86.
