= Fredericksburg, Blair County, Pennsylvania =

Unincorporated community in Pennsylvania, US

Fredericksburg, Pennsylvania
- Census-designated place
- Location within Pennsylvania Location within the United States
- Coordinates: 40°18′37″N 78°17′10″W
- Country: United States
- State: Pennsylvania
- County: Blair
- Township: North Woodbury

Area
  - Total: 0.34 sq mi (0.89 km^{2})
  - Land: 0.34 sq mi (0.89 km^{2})
  - Water: 0 sq mi (0.00 km^{2})
- Elevation: 1,300 ft (400 m)

Population (2020)
  - Total: 172
  - Density: 502.4/sq mi (193.98/km^{2})
- Time zone: UTC-5 (Eastern (EST))
  - Summer (DST): UTC-4 (EDT)
- ZIP Code: 16662 (Martinsburg)
- Area codes: 814/582
- FIPS code: 42-27641
- GNIS feature ID: 2807043

Fredericksburg, also known as Clover Creek, is an unincorporated community and census-designated place (CDP) in Blair County, Pennsylvania, United States. It was first listed as a CDP prior to the 2020 census.

== Geography ==
The community is in southeastern Blair County, in the northeastern part of North Woodbury Township. It is bordered to the south by Pennsylvania Route 164, which leads west 2 miles (3 km) to Martinsburg and southeast over Tussey Mountain 4.5 miles (7.2 km) to Pennsylvania Route 26 in Bedford County, 5 miles (8 km) north of Saxton.

The community is in the valley of Clover Creek, which flows north to join the Frankstown Branch Juniata River at Cove Forge.

== Demographics ==
Historical population
Census	Pop.	Note	%±
2020	172		—
U.S. Decennial Census

== Education ==
It is in the Spring Cove School District.
