= Snelltown, Maryland =

Unincorporated community in Maryland, United States

- Location in Maryland
- Coordinates: 39°07′29″N 76°50′14″W
- Country: United States of America
- State: Maryland
- County: Howard
- Elevation: 551 ft (168 m)
- Time zone: UTC-5 (EST)
  - Summer (DST): UTC-4 (EDT)
- ZIP code: 20723
- Area code: 240 and 301

Snelltown is an unincorporated community located near the southern tip of Howard County, Maryland.

== History ==
Snelltown is a historic African American community settled by emancipated slaves of the Snell family located in North Laurel, Maryland. A small graveyard containing the town's founders remains on a lot.

== Today ==
In the mid 1990s a land development company started to individually buy out the family properties and acquire estates with dozens of heirs without contact information. Each have been subdivided and developed as the Kings Arms subdivision.

== See also ==
- Snell's Bridge
- Bacontown, Maryland
