= Point View, Pennsylvania =

Unincorporated community in Pennsylvania, US

- Census-designated place
- Location within Pennsylvania Location within the United States
- Coordinates: 40°29′22″N 78°14′31″W
- Country: United States
- State: Pennsylvania
- County: Blair
- Township: Catharine

Area
  - Total: 0.019 sq mi (0.05 km^{2})
  - Land: 0.019 sq mi (0.05 km^{2})
  - Water: 0 sq mi (0.00 km^{2})
- Elevation: 961 ft (293 m)

Population (2020)
  - Total: 14
  - Density: 685.4/sq mi (264.65/km^{2})
- Time zone: UTC-5 (Eastern (EST))
  - Summer (DST): UTC-4 (EDT)
- ZIP Code: 16693 (Williamsburg)
- Area codes: 814/582
- FIPS code: 42-61888
- GNIS feature ID: 2805543

Point View is an unincorporated community and census-designated place (CDP) in Blair County, Pennsylvania, United States. It was first listed as a CDP prior to the 2020 census.

The CDP is in eastern Blair County, along the southwestern edge of Catharine Township. It is in the valley of Township Run, which forms the boundary between Catharine and Frankstown Township. The small, steep valley is between Short Mountain to the east and the south end of Canoe Mountain to the west, and drains south to the Frankstown Branch of the Juniata River. Pennsylvania Route 866 is the southern edge of the CDP; the highway leads southeast down the Frankstown Branch 3 miles (5 km) to Williamsburg and west 0.5 miles (0.8 km) to U.S. Route 22, which continues west 9 miles (14 km) to Hollidaysburg, the Blair county seat.

== Demographics ==
Historical population
Census	Pop.	Note	%±
2020	14		—
U.S. Decennial Census

== Education ==
It is in the Williamsburg Community School District.
