= Clover Creek (Pennsylvania) =

Stream in Pennsylvania, United States

Coordinates: 40°28′37″N 78°10′33″W

Clover Creek is a 24.5-mile-long (39.4 km) tributary of the Frankstown Branch Juniata River in Bedford and Blair counties, Pennsylvania, in the United States.

It originates in Woodbury Township in Bedford County on Tussey Mountain, between Pulpit Hill and the north end of Warrior Ridge. It flows northward through Morrisons Cove along the west side of Tussey Mountain, passing through Henrietta, and receives Middle Run to the north of there. Pennsylvania Route 164 crosses it at the village of Clover Creek. The creek follows the mountain in curving slightly eastward as well as northward, and passes through Beavertown and Shellytown. Around Larke, the valley begins to deepen, and just after meeting Snare Run, the creek joins the Frankstown Branch Juniata River at Cove Forge.

Although the stream is small, it is well known for its trout fishing, and is fished heavily during open seasons. Clover Creek also serves as a valuable irrigation source for nearby farmers. The stream averages in width about 17 feet (5.2 m), although its width varies from 7 feet (2.1 m) to over 50 feet (15 m).

== Tributaries ==
- Snare Run
- Middle Run

== See also ==
- List of rivers of Pennsylvania
