= Daniel Royer House =

Historic house in Pennsylvania, United States

- U.S. National Register of Historic Places
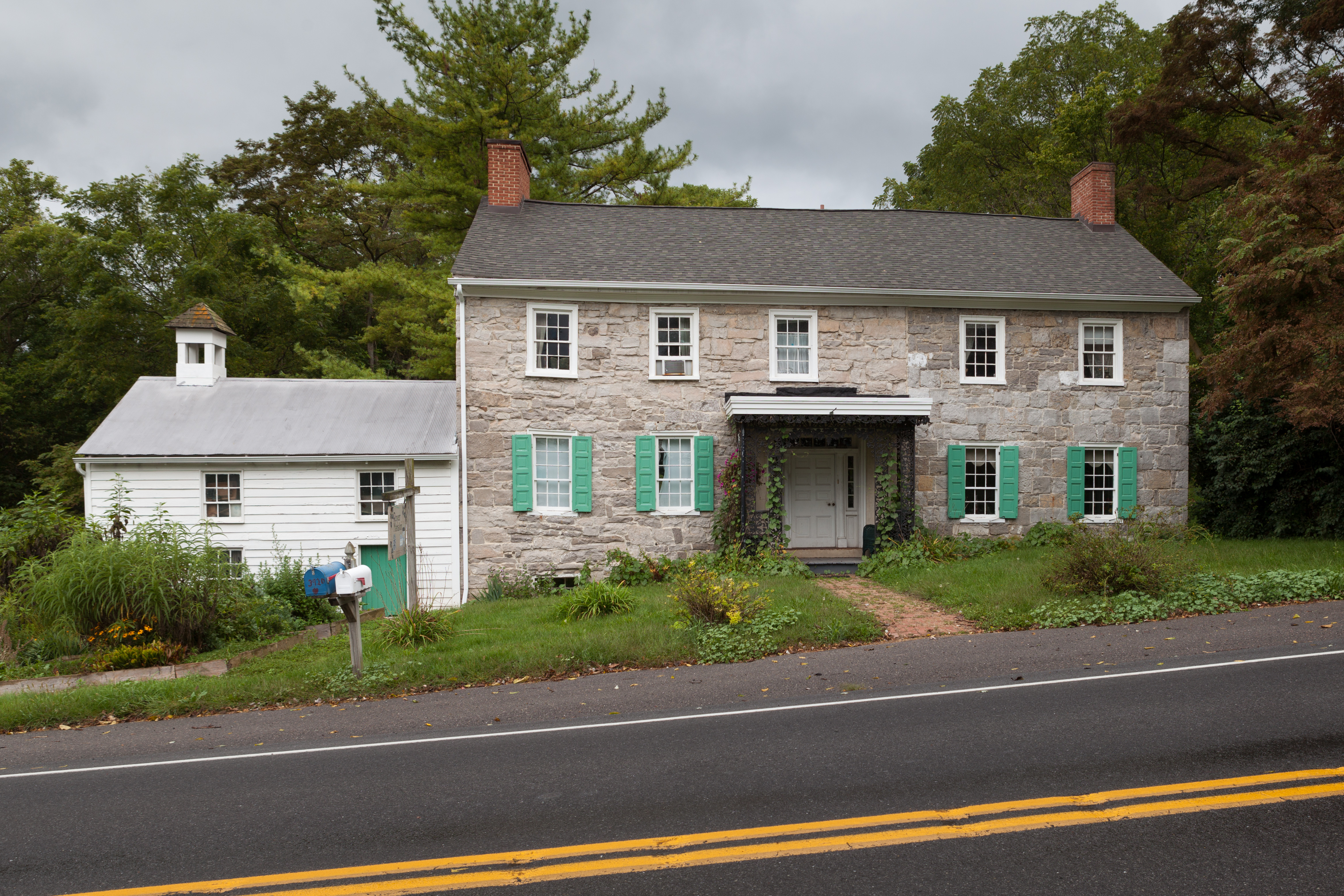
- East side of the house in September 2014

- Location within Pennsylvania Location within the United States
- Location: 5 miles (8.0 km) southwest of Williamsburg on Pennsylvania Route 866, Woodbury Township, Pennsylvania
- Coordinates: 40°25′25″N 78°16′13″W
- Area: 5 acres (2.0 ha)
- Built: 1815, c. 1840
- NRHP reference No.: 75001620
- Added to NRHP: November 3, 1975

Daniel Royer House is a historic home located in the community of Royer, Woodbury Township, Blair County, Pennsylvania. It was built in at least two sections. The oldest section is a three-bay, two-story stone section built about 1815. Built about the same time was a 1 1/2-story clapboard section. A two-bay by five-bay wing addition was probably built in the 1840s. It features a two-story porch across the length of the addition. The house is associated with the Royer family; early settlers of Woodbury Township and prominent in the local iron making industry.

It was added to the National Register of Historic Places in 1975.
