= Williamsburg Historic District (Williamsburg, Pennsylvania) =

Historic district in Pennsylvania, United States

- U.S. National Register of Historic Places
- U.S. Historic district
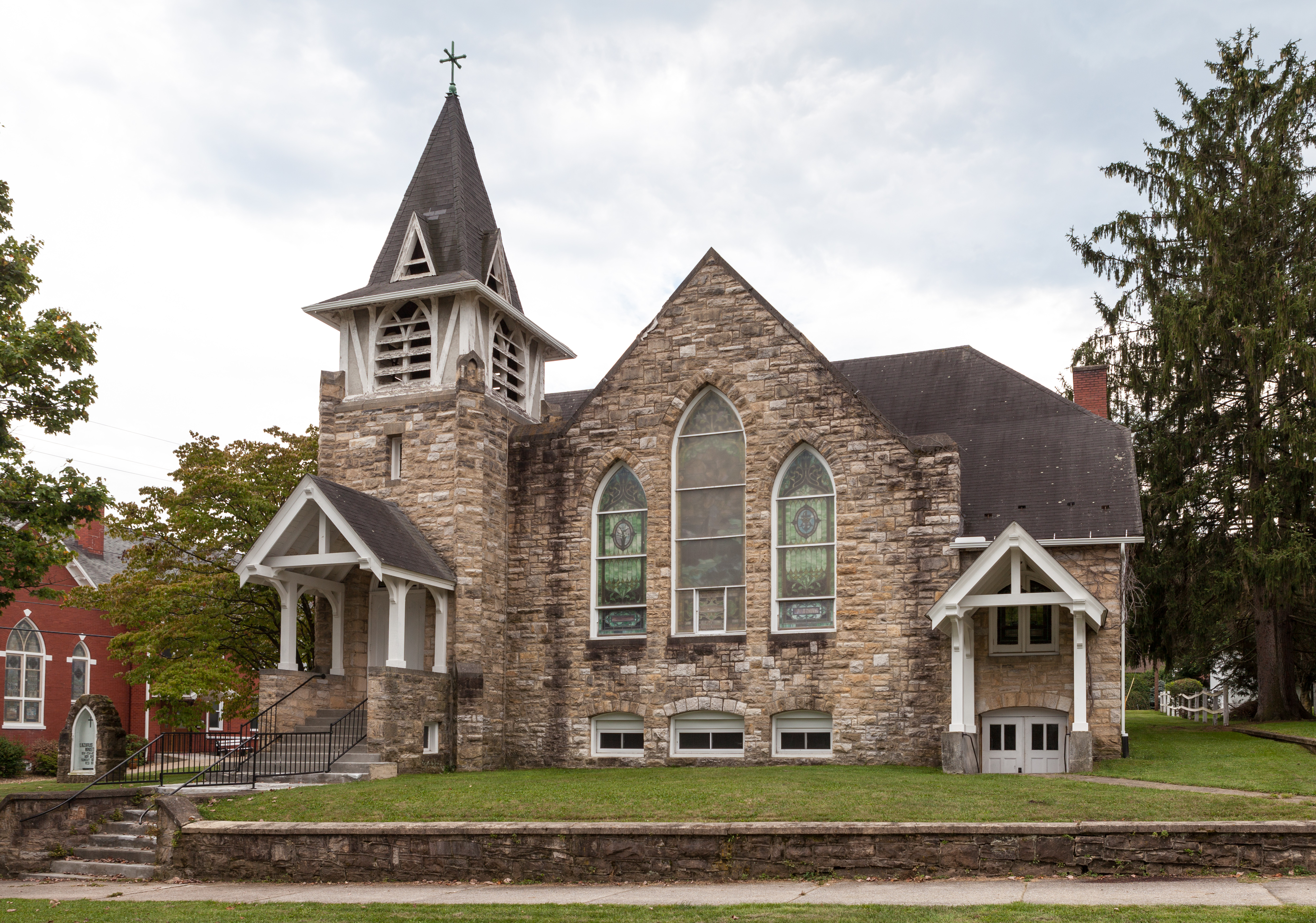
- Reformed Church

- Location within Pennsylvania Location within the United States
- Location: Approximately 30 square blocks centered around Second and High Sts., Williamsburg, Pennsylvania
- Coordinates: 40°27′39″N 78°12′14″W
- Area: 160 acres (65 ha)
- Built: 1832
- Architect: Rhule, David S.
- Architectural style: Late 19th And 20th Century Revivals, Late Victorian, Federal
- NRHP reference No.: 95000518
- Added to NRHP: May 12, 1995

The Williamsburg Historic District is a national historic district that is located in Williamsburg, Blair County, Pennsylvania.

It was added to the National Register of Historic Places in 1995.

== History and architectural features ==
This district includes 362 contributing buildings and six contributing structures that are located in the central business district and surrounding residential areas of Williamsburg. The earliest buildings date to the 1830s, when the community was expanded as a canal town along the Pennsylvania Main Line Canal. The buildings are primarily frame and brick, with notable examples of Federal and Late Victorian style architecture.

Notable non-residential buildings include the Schwab Hotel (c. 1910), the Hollidaysburg Trust Company (1873), the Presbyterian Church (1841), Zion Lutheran Church (1907), the Church of the Brethren (1911), Williamsburg High School (1918), and the Community Elementary School building (1941). Also located in the district are the Presbyterian (c. 1824), Methodist (c. 1831), Lutheran (c. 1835), and Lutheran and German Reformed (c. 1804) cemeteries, Big Spring, and the Pennsylvania Main Line Canal and Pennsylvania Railroad right-of-way.

== Gallery ==
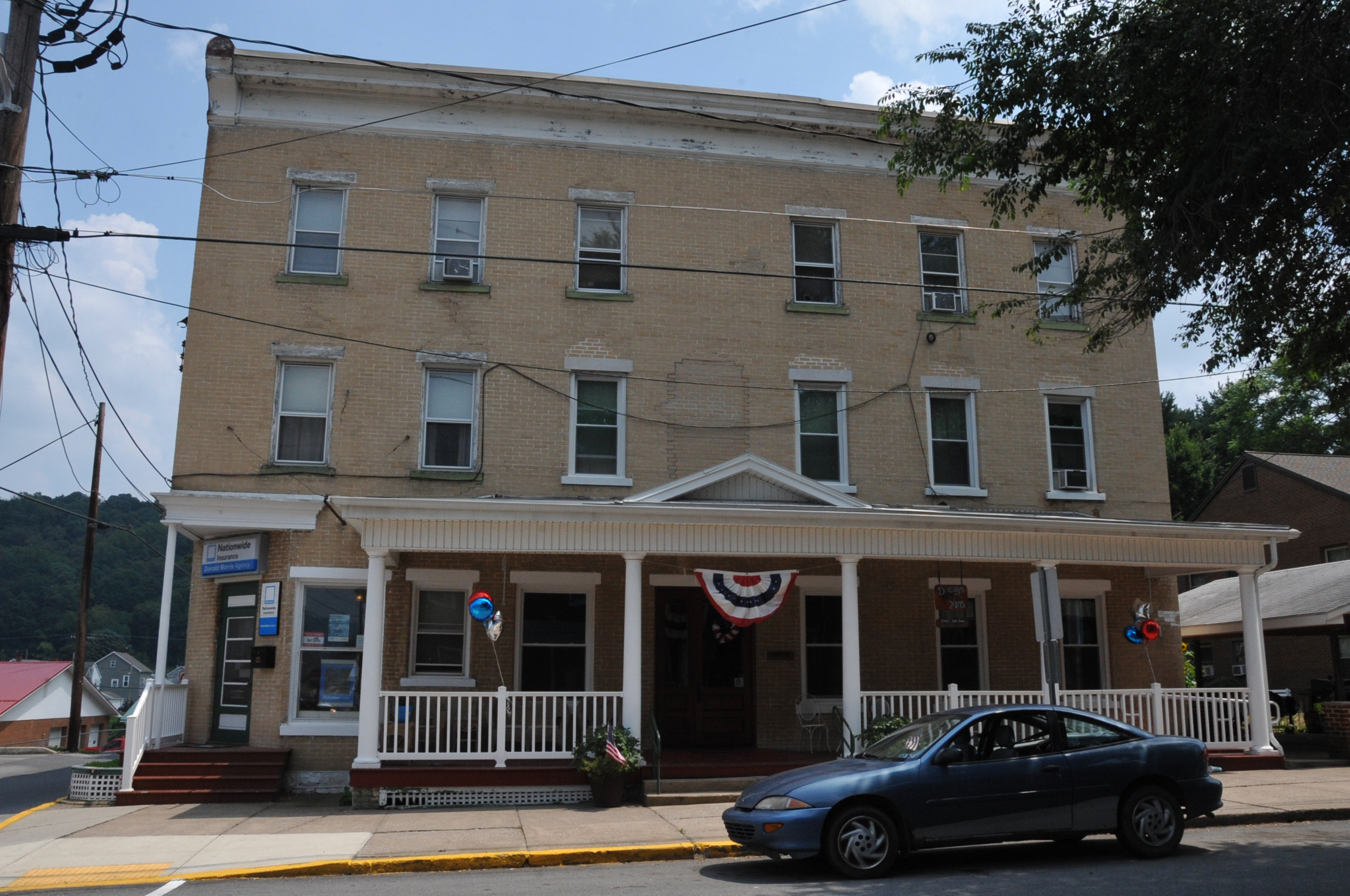
Schwab Hotel

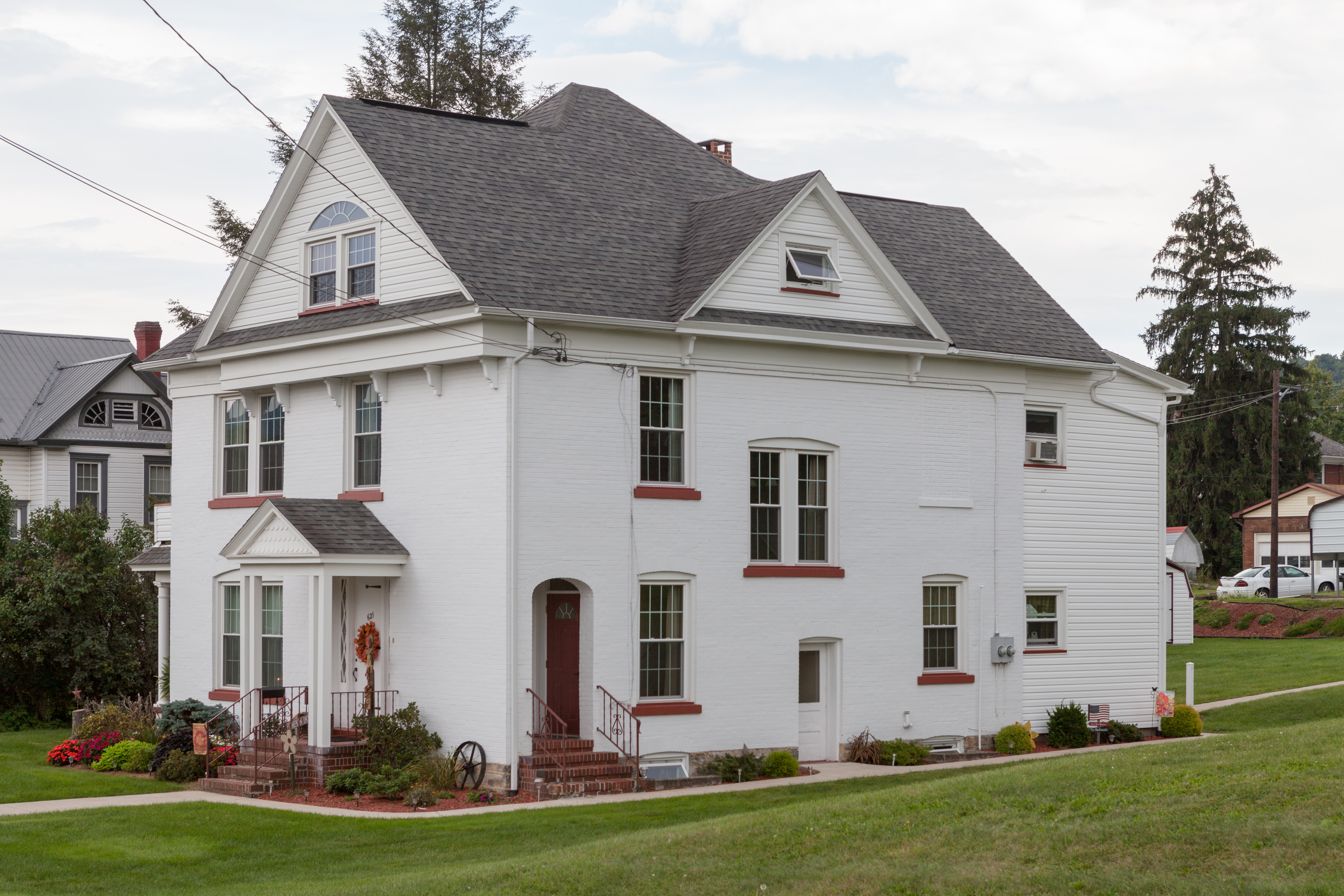
621 West Second Street

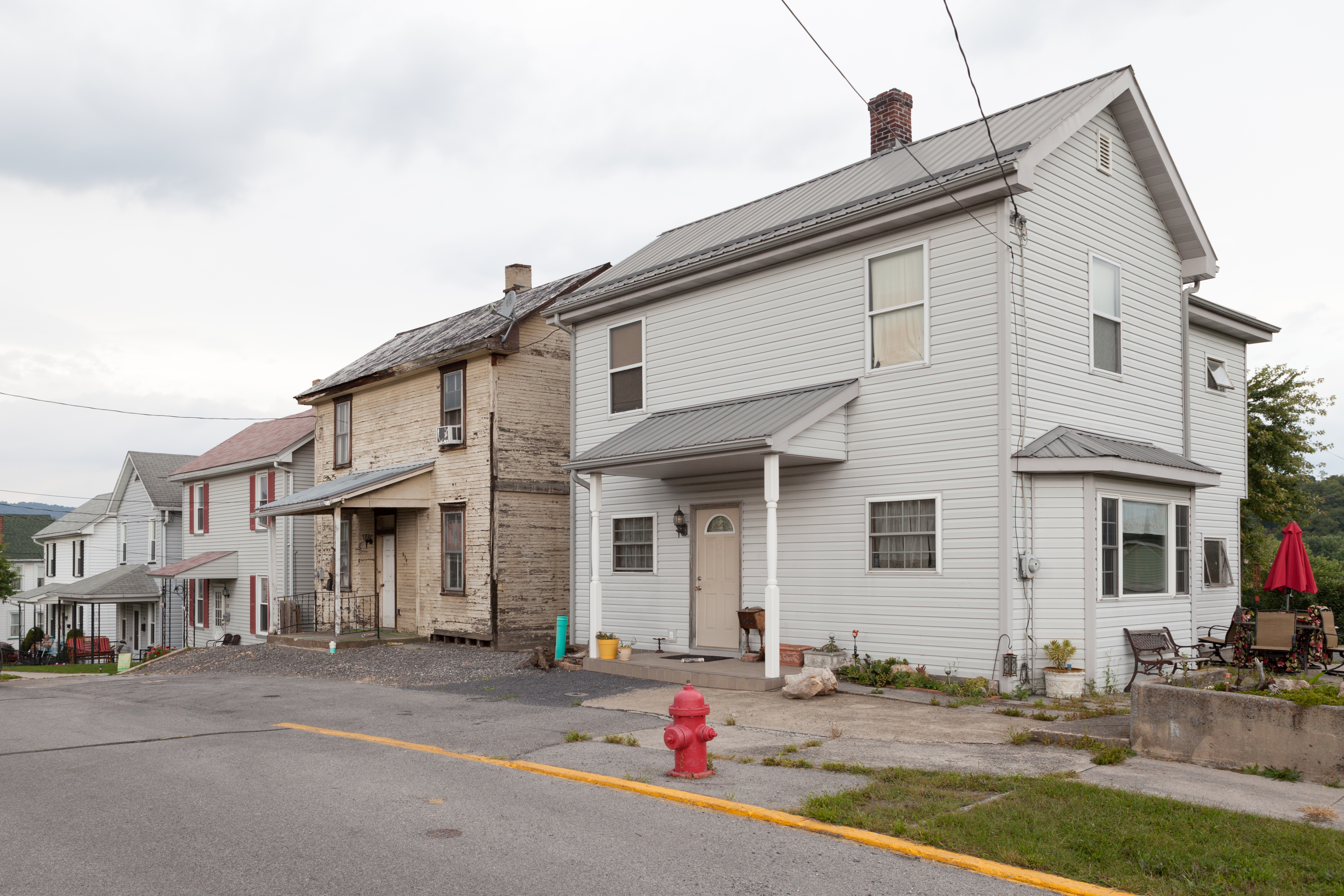
West Second Street
