= Huston Township, Blair County, Pennsylvania =

Township in Pennsylvania, US

Coordinates: 40°22′15″N 78°14′49″W

- Township
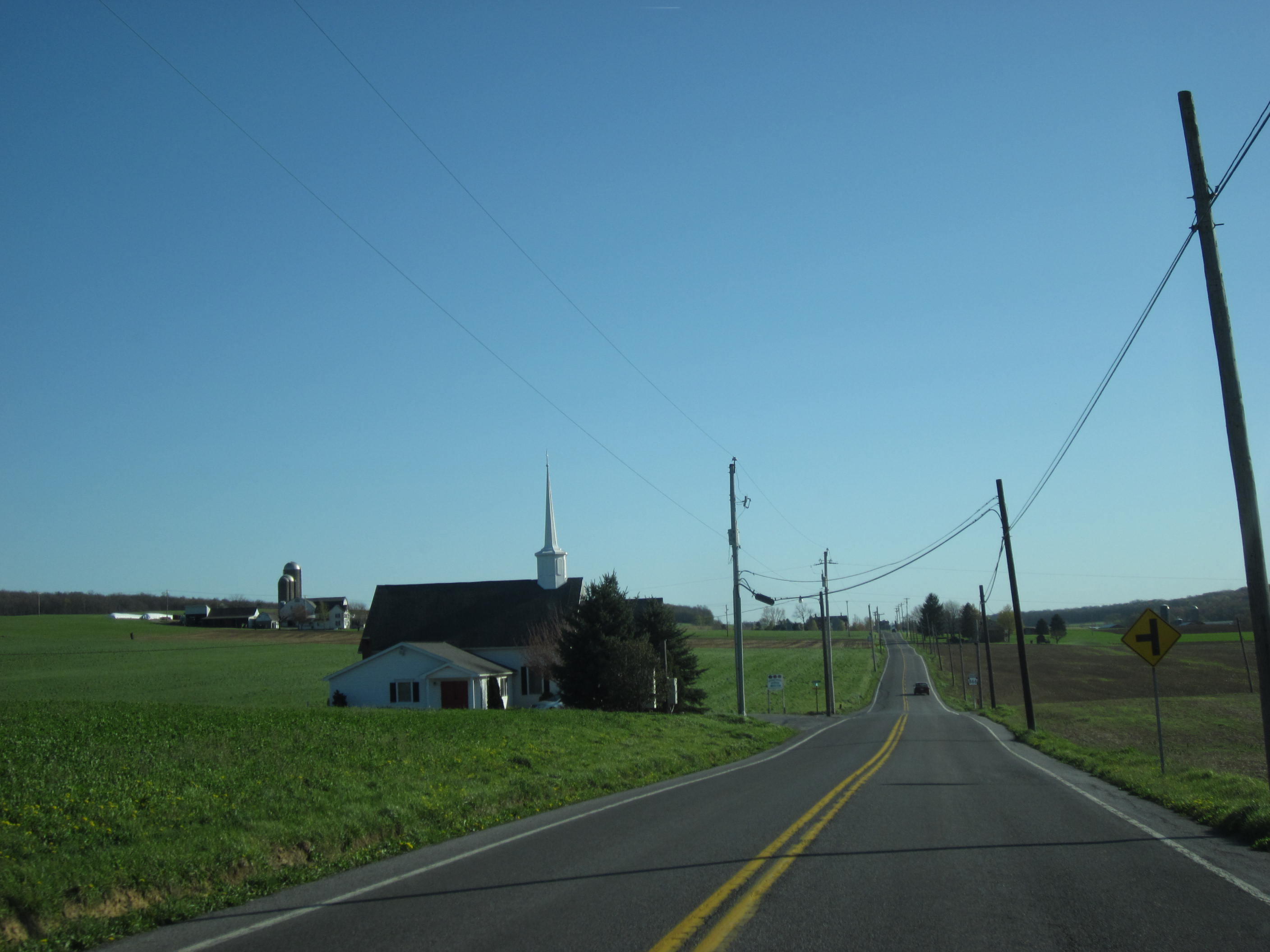
- PA 866 southbound in Huston Township

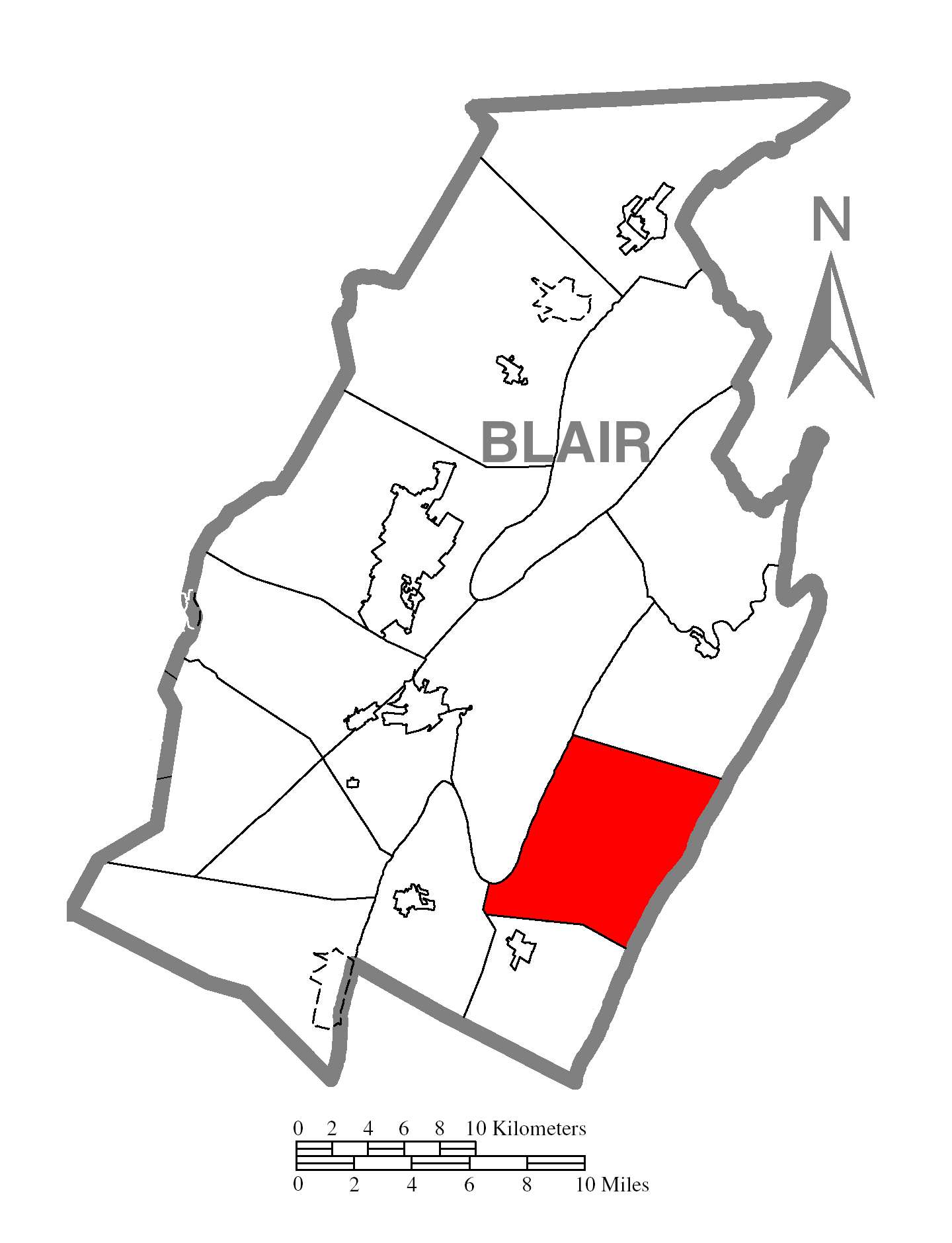
- Map of Blair County, Pennsylvania highlighting Huston Township

- Map of Blair County, Pennsylvania
- Country: United States
- State: Pennsylvania
- County: Blair
- Settled: 1770
- Incorporated: 1842

Government
  - Type: Board of Supervisors

Area
  - Total: 34.90 sq mi (90.40 km^{2})
  - Land: 34.89 sq mi (90.37 km^{2})
  - Water: 0.012 sq mi (0.03 km^{2})

Population (2020)
  - Total: 1,247 ▼
  - Estimate (2022): 1,239
  - Density: 38.4/sq mi (14.84/km^{2})
- Time zone: UTC-5 (Eastern (EST))
  - Summer (DST): UTC-4 (EDT)
- Area code: 814
- FIPS code: 42-013-36496

Huston Township is a township in Blair County, Pennsylvania, United States. It is part of the Altoona, PA Metropolitan Statistical Area. The population was 1,247 at the 2020 census.

== General information ==
- ZIP code: 16662
- Area code: 814
- Local telephone exchange: 793

== Geography ==
Huston Township is located in southeastern Blair County, between Tussey Mountain to the east and Lock Mountain to the west. Its eastern border is the Blair County–Huntingdon County line. It contains the census-designated places of Beavertown, Clappertown, Jugtown, and Oreminea.

According to the United States Census Bureau, the township has a total area of 34.9 square miles (90.4 km^{2}), of which 0.01 square miles (0.03 km^{2}), or 0.03%, is water.

== Recreation ==
Portions of Pennsylvania State Game Lands Number 73 are located along the eastern border and Number 147 is located along the western border of the township.

== Demographics ==
Historical population
| Census | Pop. | Note | %± |
|---|---|---|---|
| 2010 | 1,336 | | — |
| 2020 | 1,247 | | −6.7% |
| 2022 (est.) | 1,239 | | −0.6% |
U.S. Decennial Census

As of the census of 2000, there were 1,262 people, 452 households, and 340 families residing in the township. The population density was 36.0 inhabitants per square mile (13.9/km^{2}). There were 476 housing units at an average density of 13.6/sq mi (5.2/km^{2}). The racial makeup of the township was 99.37% White, 0.32% African American, and 0.32% from two or more races. Hispanic or Latino of any race were 0.24% of the population.

There were 452 households, out of which 36.7% had children under the age of 18 living with them, 66.2% were married couples living together, 5.8% had a female householder with no husband present, and 24.6% were non-families. 21.2% of all households were made up of individuals, and 8.4% had someone living alone who was 65 years of age or older. The average household size was 2.79 and the average family size was 3.27.

In the township the population was spread out, with 28.8% under the age of 18, 8.0% from 18 to 24, 28.3% from 25 to 44, 23.8% from 45 to 64, and 11.1% who were 65 years of age or older. The median age was 35 years. For every 100 females, there were 100.3 males. For every 100 females age 18 and over, there were 101.3 males.

The median income for a household in the township was $36,250, and the median income for a family was $44,063. Males had a median income of $25,577 versus $20,446 for females. The per capita income for the township was $15,688. About 10.6% of families and 12.8% of the population were below the poverty line, including 16.6% of those under age 18 and 16.2% of those age 65 or over.
