= Pennsylvania Route 866 =

State highway in Pennsylvania, US

Pennsylvania Route 866

Route information
- Maintained by PennDOT
- Length: 22.435 mi (36.106 km)

Major junctions
- South end: PA 36 in Woodbury
- PA 164 in Martinsburg
- North end: US 22 in Frankstown Township

Location
- Country: United States
- State: Pennsylvania
- Counties: Bedford, Blair

Highway system
- Pennsylvania State Route System; Interstate; US; State; Scenic; Legislative
← PA 865	→ PA 867
← PA 202	→ PA 204
← PA 983	→ PA 985

Pennsylvania Route 866 (PA 866) is a 22.4-mile-long (36.0 km) state highway located in Bedford and Blair Counties in central Pennsylvania. The southern terminus is at PA 36 in Woodbury. The northern terminus is at U.S. Route 22 (US 22) in Frankstown Township.

== Route description ==
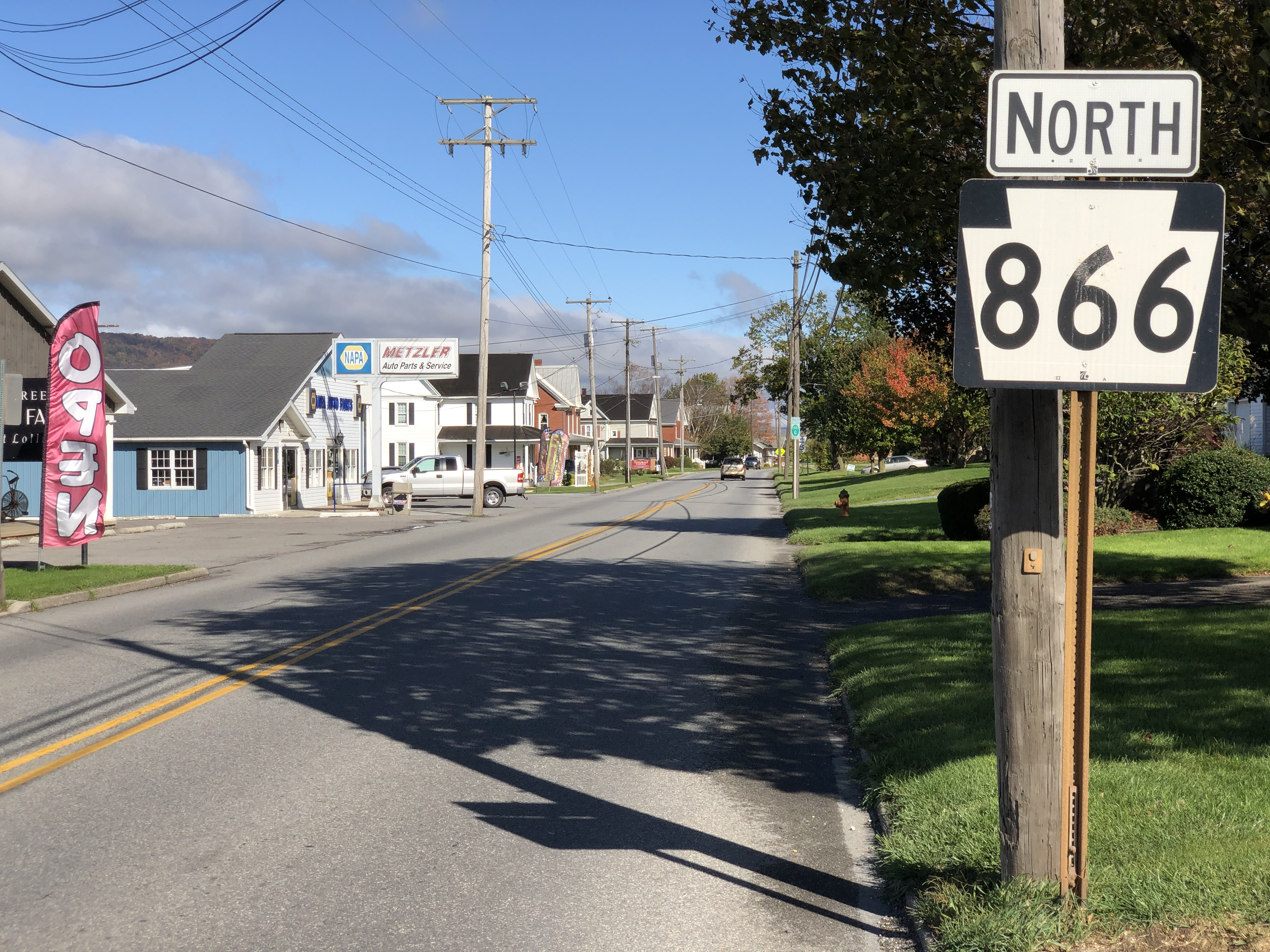
PA 866 northbound in Martinsburg

PA 866 begins at an intersection with PA 36 in Woodbury Township, Bedford County, heading northeast on two-lane undivided Curryville Road. The road heads through open agricultural areas with some woods. The route crosses into North Woodbury Township in Blair County, where it passes through more farmland prior to heading through the residential community of Curryville. From here, PA 866 continues through open farm fields with some homes, passing to the west of Altoona–Blair County Airport. The road heads north-northeast into the borough of Martinsburg and becomes South Market Street, passing homes and a few businesses. In the commercial center of town, the route crosses PA 164 and becomes North Market Street, heading past more residences. PA 866 briefly becomes the border between Martinsburg to the west and North Woodbury Township to the east before crossing back into North Woodbury Township and becoming Piney Creek Road, heading into agricultural areas.

The road enters Huston Township, running through more open farmland with occasional homes. Farther north, the route passes through the communities of Barbara and Clappertown before crossing into Woodbury Township. Here, PA 866 continues through agricultural areas with some woods and residences, passing through Royer before turning to the northeast. The road runs through more farmland before heading into wooded areas with a few homes. The route heads into the borough of Williamsburg and becomes High Street, running north-northeast through residential areas. PA 866 passes businesses and turns west-northwest onto West 1st Street, passing more homes. The route forks to the northwest onto Canal Street and passes a few industrial buildings. The road heads back into Woodbury Township and becomes Juniata River Road, heading through woodland with a few residences and running to the southwest of the Frankstown Branch Juniata River. PA 866 crosses the river into Catharine Township and runs through more forests along the northeast bank of the river. At Point View, the route curves to the west and enters Frankstown Township, heading southwest to its northern terminus at US 22.

== Major intersections ==
County	Location	mi	km	Destinations	Notes
Bedford	Woodbury Township	0.000	0.000	PA 36 (Woodbury Pike) – Woodbury, Roaring Spring	Southern terminus
Blair	Martinsburg	5.393	8.679	PA 164 (Allegheny Street)	
Blair	Frankstown Township	22.435	36.106	US 22 (William Penn Highway) – Huntingdon, Hollidaysburg	Northern terminus
1.000 mi = 1.609 km; 1.000 km = 0.621 mi
