= Yellow Springs, Blair County, Pennsylvania =

Unincorporated community in Pennsylvania, US

Coordinates: 40°31′02″N 78°12′24″W

Yellow Springs is a populated place in Catharine Township, Blair County, Pennsylvania, United States, with the zip code 16693.

== Education ==
It is in the Williamsburg Community School District.
