= Woodbury Township, Blair County, Pennsylvania =

Township in Pennsylvania, US

Coordinates: 40°30′06″N 78°09′29″W

- Township
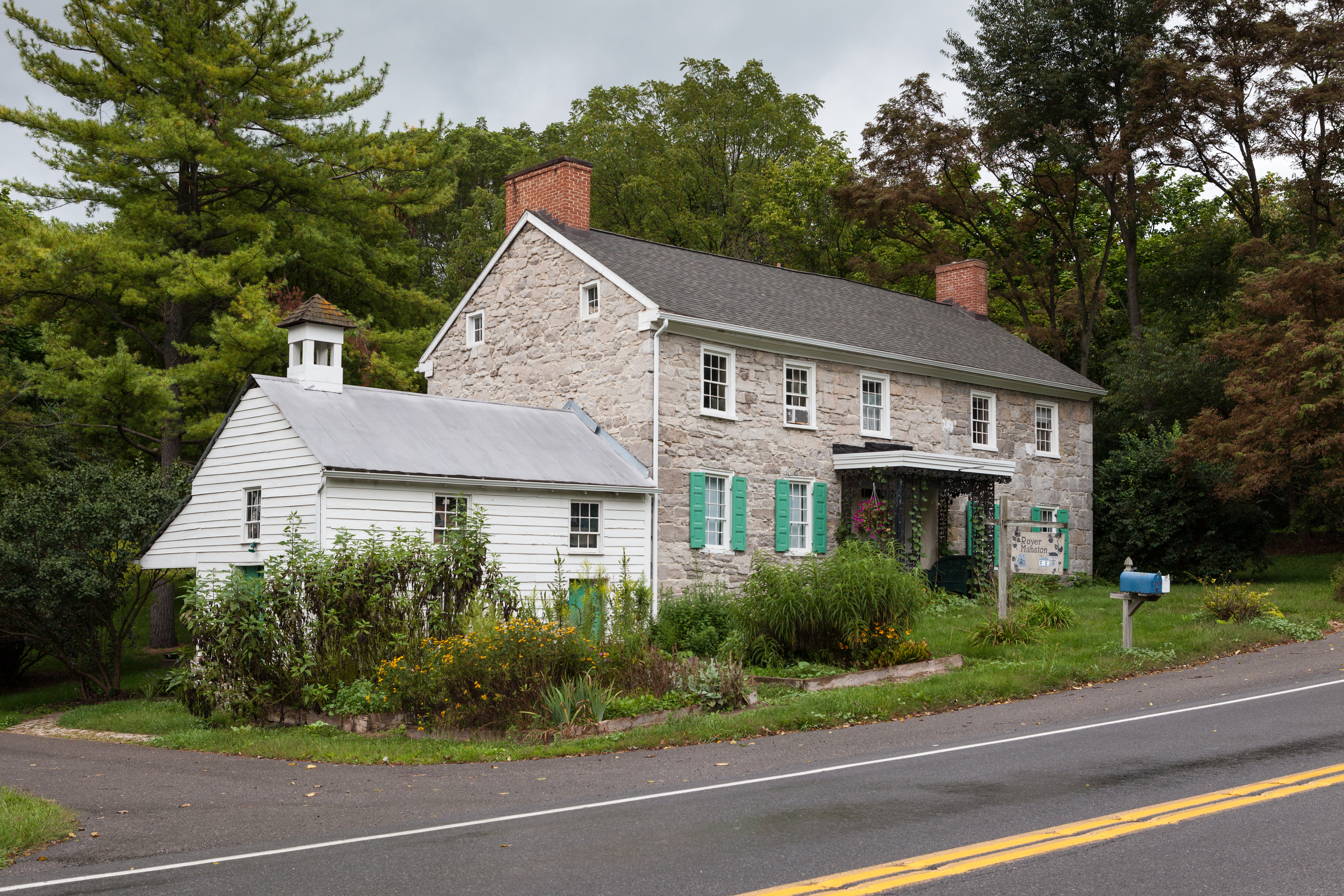
- The Daniel Royer House, a historic site in the township

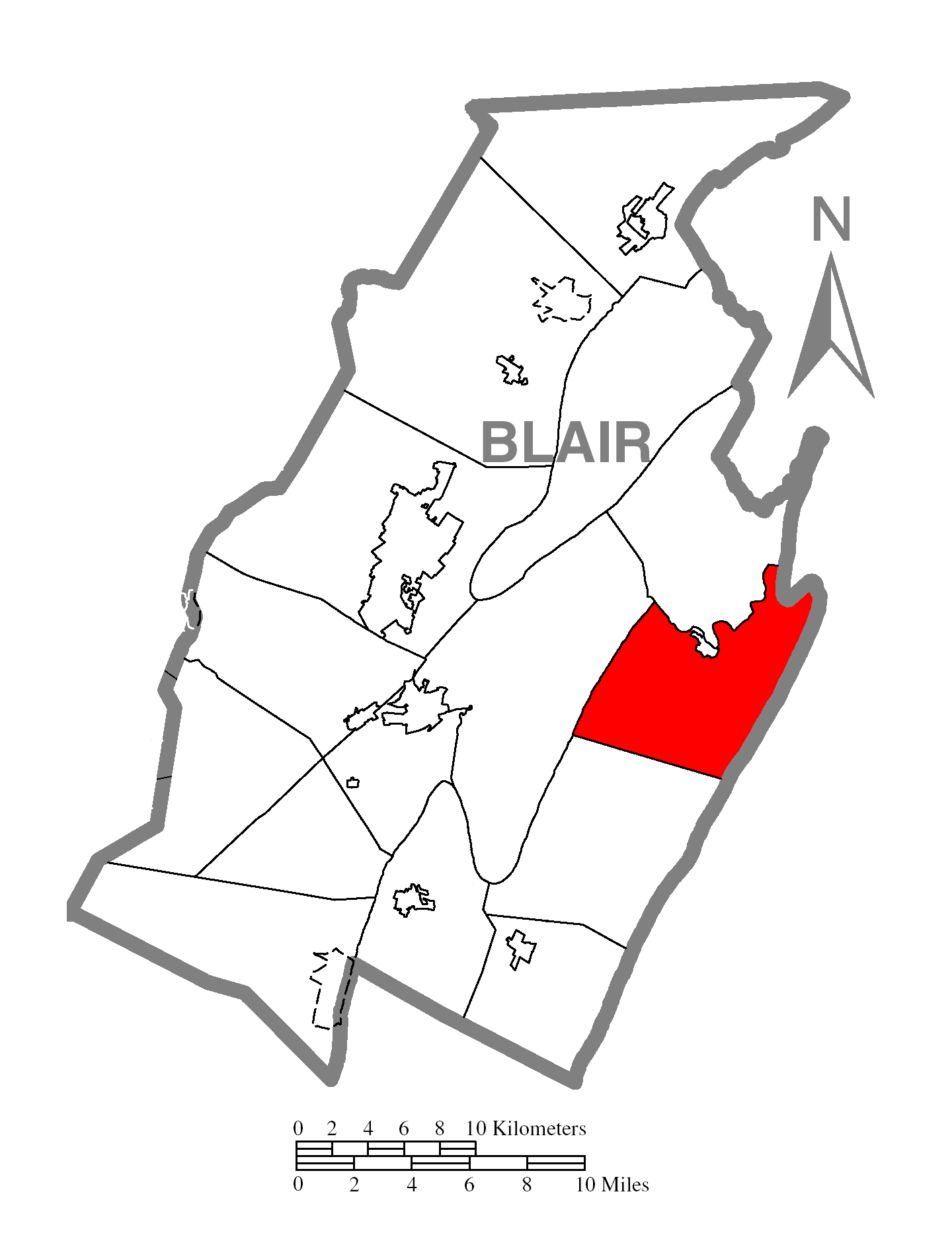
- Map of Blair County, Pennsylvania highlighting Woobury Township

- Map of Blair County, Pennsylvania
- Country: United States
- State: Pennsylvania
- County: Blair
- Settled: 1765
- Incorporated: 1787

Government
  - Type: Board of Supervisors

Area
  - Total: 32.37 sq mi (83.85 km^{2})
  - Land: 32.37 sq mi (83.85 km^{2})
  - Water: 0 sq mi (0.00 km^{2})

Population (2020)
  - Total: 1,438 ▼
  - Estimate (2022): 1,426
  - Density: 51.5/sq mi (19.87/km^{2})
- Time zone: UTC-5 (Eastern (EST))
  - Summer (DST): UTC-4 (EDT)
- Area code: 814
- FIPS code: 42-013-86144

Woodbury Township is a township in Blair County, Pennsylvania, United States. It is part of the Altoona, PA Metropolitan Statistical Area. The population was 1,438 at the 2020 census.

== General information ==
- ZIP code: 16693
- Area code: 814
- Local telephone exchange: 832

== Geography ==
Woodbury Township is located along the eastern edge of Blair County, with Huntingdon County to the east. It is bordered by the Frankstown Branch of the Juniata River and the borough of Williamsburg to the north, by the ridgecrest of Tussey Mountain to the east, and by the crest of Lock Mountain to the west. It contains the unincorporated communities of Cove Forge, Fisherville, Ganister, Franklin Forge, Shelltown, Royer, Larke, and Shellytown.

According to the United States Census Bureau, the township has a total area of 32.4 square miles (83.9 km^{2}), all land.

== Recreation ==
A portion of Pennsylvania State Game Lands Number 73 is located at the southwestern corner of the township, portions of the Pennsylvania State Game Lands Number 147 is located in the west on Dunning Mountain, and most of the Pennsylvania State Game Lands Number 118 occupies the western slopes of Tussey Mountain on the east side of the township.

== Demographics ==
Historical population
| Census | Pop. | Note | %± |
|---|---|---|---|
| 1800 | 752 | | — |
| 1820 | 1,107 | | — |
| 1830 | 1,765 | | 59.4% |
| 1840 | 2,102 | | 19.1% |
| 1850 | 2,197 | | 4.5% |
| 1860 | 2,077 | | −5.5% |
| 1870 | 2,107 | | 1.4% |
| 1880 | 1,894 | | −10.1% |
| 1890 | 2,112 | | 11.5% |
| 1900 | 1,537 | | −27.2% |
| 1910 | 2,129 | | 38.5% |
| 1920 | 2,029 | | −4.7% |
| 1930 | 1,479 | | −27.1% |
| 1940 | 1,474 | | −0.3% |
| 1950 | 1,379 | | −6.4% |
| 1960 | 1,319 | | −4.4% |
| 1970 | 1,264 | | −4.2% |
| 1980 | 1,519 | | 20.2% |
| 1990 | 1,418 | | −6.6% |
| 2000 | 1,637 | | 15.4% |
| 2010 | 1,693 | | 3.4% |
| 2020 | 1,438 | | −15.1% |
| 2022 (est.) | 1,426 | | −0.8% |
U.S. Decennial Census

As of the census of 2000, there were 1,637 people, 570 households, and 458 families residing in the township. The population density was 50.3 inhabitants per square mile (19.4/km^{2}). There were 614 housing units at an average density of 18.9/sq mi (7.3/km^{2}). The racial makeup of the township was 97.86% White, 1.41% African American, 0.06% Native American, 0.06% Asian, 0.06% from other races, and 0.55% from two or more races. Hispanic or Latino of any race were 0.31% of the population.

There were 570 households, out of which 30.7% had children under the age of 18 living with them, 68.9% were married couples living together, 6.3% had a female householder with no husband present, and 19.6% were non-families. 17.4% of all households were made up of individuals, and 7.5% had someone living alone who was 65 years of age or older. The average household size was 2.71 and the average family size was 3.05.

In the township the population was spread out, with 22.6% under the age of 18, 8.9% from 18 to 24, 27.9% from 25 to 44, 26.0% from 45 to 64, and 14.7% who were 65 years of age or older. The median age was 39 years. For every 100 females there were 106.2 males. For every 100 females age 18 and over, there were 105.7 males.

The median income for a household in the township was $35,170, and the median income for a family was $40,132. Males had a median income of $30,667 versus $21,691 for females. The per capita income for the township was $14,946. About 7.5% of families and 10.1% of the population were below the poverty line, including 12.6% of those under age 18 and 8.0% of those age 65 or over.
