= Williamsburg Community School District (Pennsylvania) =

School district in Pennsylvania

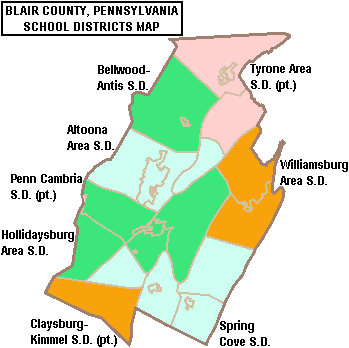

Address
- 515 W. Third Street Williamsburg, Pennsylvania, 16693-1121; United States

District information
- Type: Public
- Established: 1917

Students and staff
- District mascot: Blue Pirates
- Colors: Blue and White

Other information
- Website: http://www.williamsburg.k12.pa.us/

The Williamsburg Community School District is a small, rural, public school district in Blair County, Pennsylvania. It serves the borough of Williamsburg, plus the townships of Woodbury and Catharine. the district encompasses approximately 65 square miles (170 km^{2}). According to 2020 federal census data, it serves a resident population of 3,452.

== School Facilities ==
- Williamsburg Elementary School was built in 1942 with additions in 1955 and 1999, when the last renovation to the structure was completed. Grades K-6
- Williamsburg High School was originally constructed in 1917 with additions in 1937, 1942, 1964, and 1979. WHS was renovated in 1999. Grades 7–12

== Extracurriculars ==
The district offers a variety of clubs, activities and sports.

=== Athletics ===
The District funds:

- Baseball – Class A
- Basketball Boys – Class A
- Basketball Girls – Class A
- Football – Class A
- Softball – Class A
- Volleyball – Class A

Junior High School Sports

Boys

- Baseball
- Basketball
- Football

Girls

- Basketball
- Softball
- Volleyball

- According to PIAA directory July 2012
