= Juniata River =

River in Pennsylvania, United States

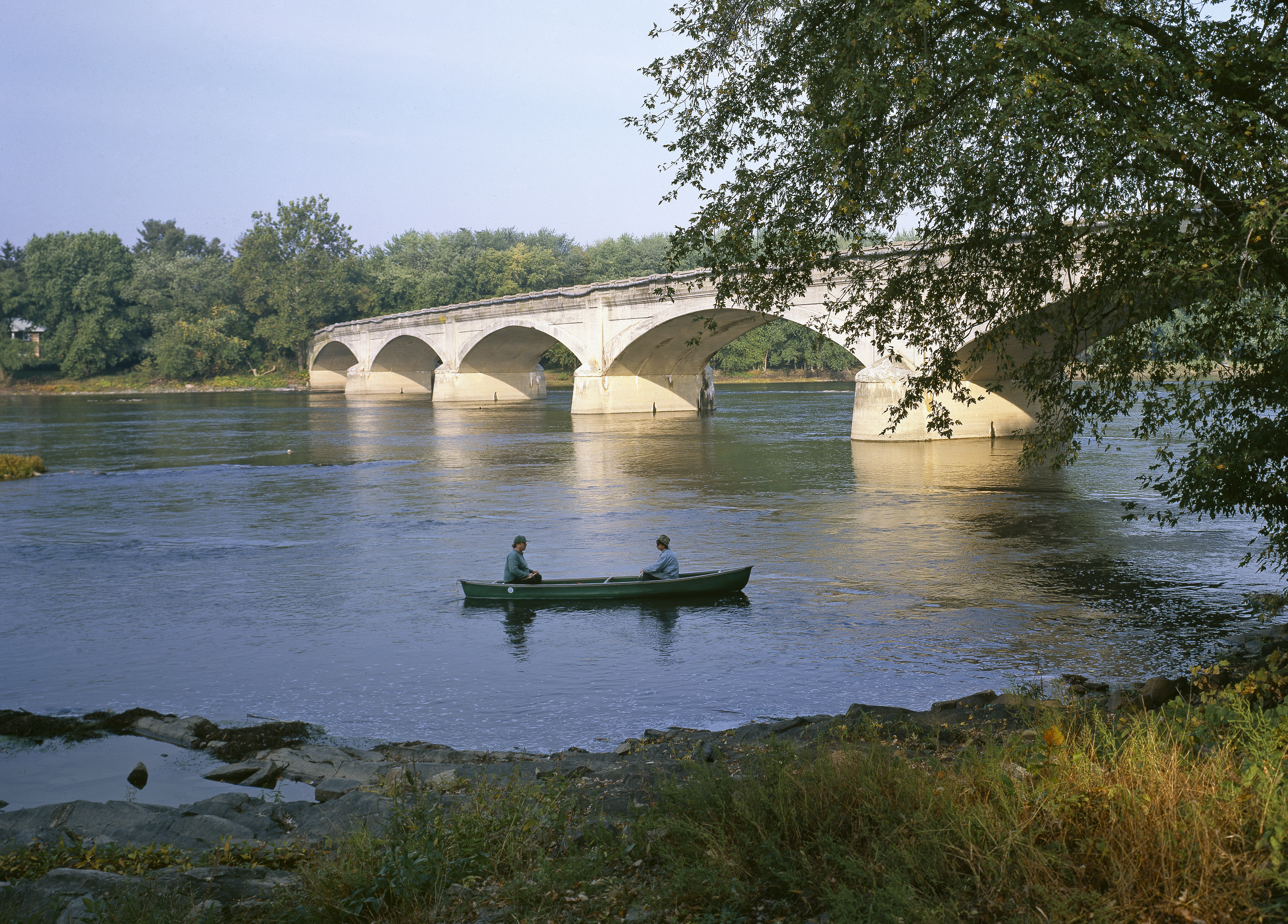
- The Appalachian Trail crossing the mouth of the Juniata River. Photo by Carol M. Highsmith

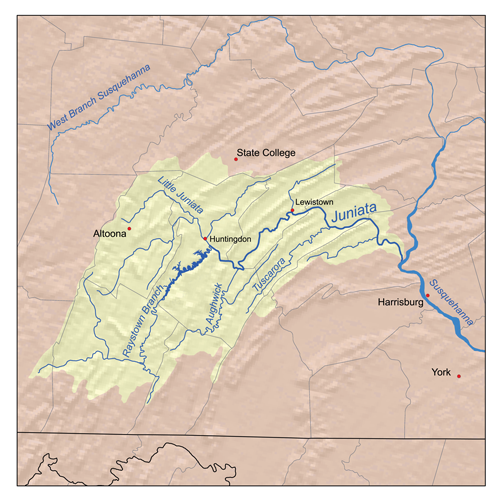
- Juniata River watershed and tributaries

Location
- Country: United States
- State: Pennsylvania
- Counties: Dauphin, Perry, Juniata, Mifflin, Huntingdon, Bedford, Somerset
- Cities: Duncannon, Newport, Millerstown, Thompsontown, Port Royal, Mifflintown, Lewistown, Mount Union, Huntingdon

Physical characteristics
- Source: Frankstown Branch
  - location: Blair County, Pennsylvania, US
- 2nd source: Little Juniata River
  - location: Pennsylvania, US
- Source confluence
  - location: Petersburg, Pennsylvania, US
  - coordinates: 40°33′39″N 78°04′06″W
  - elevation: 660 ft (200 m)
- Mouth: Susquehanna River
  - location: Duncannon, Perry County, Dauphin County, Pennsylvania, US
  - coordinates: 40°24′05″N 77°00′48″W
  - elevation: 330 ft (100 m)
- Length: 104 mi (167 km)
- Basin size: 3,400 sq mi (8,800 km^{2})
- Discharge
  - location: Newport
  - average: 4,476 cu ft/s (126.7 m^{3}/s)
  - minimum: 636 cu ft/s (18.0 m^{3}/s)
  - maximum: 209,000 cu ft/s (5,900 m^{3}/s)
- Discharge
  - location: Mapleton Depot
  - average: 2,724 cu ft/s (77.1 m^{3}/s)

Basin features
- Tributaries
  - left: Standing Stone Creek, Kishacoquillas Creek
  - right: Raystown Branch, Aughwick Creek, Tuscarora Creek

The Juniata River (/ˌdʒuːniˈætə/) is a tributary of the Susquehanna River in central Pennsylvania. The Juniata is about 104 mi (167 km) long with a watershed of about 3,400 square miles (8,800 km^{2}), about one-eighth of the drainage area of the Susquehanna, making it the second-largest tributary after the West Branch Susquehanna.

The river is considered scenic along much of its route, having a broad and shallow course passing through several mountain ridges and steeply lined water gaps. About two-thirds of the watershed is forested. It formed an early 18th-century frontier region in Pennsylvania and was the site of French-allied Native American attacks against English colonial settlements during the French and Indian War.

== Description ==
The Juniata River forms in western Huntingdon County at the confluence of the Frankstown Branch and the Little Juniata River, between the boroughs of Alexandria and Petersburg. The river flows southeast through Huntingdon and continues to the small village of Ardenheim, where the Raystown Branch, the longest of the Juniata's tributaries, enters from the southwest. The Juniata continues southeast, through a gap in the Jacks Mountain ridge. On the southeast side of the ridge it receives Aughwick Creek from the south, then flows northeast, along the eastern flank of the Jacks Mountain ridge to Lewistown, where it collects Kishacoquillas Creek and Jacks Creek. From Lewistown it flows southeast, in a winding course, receiving Tuscarora Creek from the south at the Port Royal river bridge and passing through a gap in the Tuscarora Mountain ridge. The Juniata River is joined by three creeks in Millerstown in northeast Perry County. It receives Cocolamus Creek .7 miles (1.1 km) southeast, Raccoon Creek .5 miles (0.80 km) southeast, and Wildcat Run 2.8 miles (4.5 km) southeast of Millerstown. The river also receives Buffalo Creek .9 miles (1.4 km) northwest of Newport. The Juniata River joins the Susquehanna River in Reed Township, Dauphin County immediately northwest of the Clarks Ferry Bridge. This is northeast of Duncannon and approximately 15 miles (24 km) northwest of Harrisburg.

Along the river's banks there are many access areas maintained by the Pennsylvania Fish and Boat Commission, as well as informal access areas and campground river access. The Juniata River is a popular spot for swimming, fishing, and boating. It even used to be the host of the Juniata River Sojourn, which was held annually from 2001 (when the river was named Pennsylvania River of the Year) through 2015.

== Etymology ==
The word "Juniata" is thought to be a corruption of the Iroquoian word Onayutta, meaning "Standing Stone". There was a large standing stone where the town of Huntingdon now stands. It was reportedly 14.5 feet (4.4 m) tall and contained carvings recording the history of the local Juniata Tribe. It disappeared in 1754, when the tribe left; tradition says they took it with them. A second stone was raised by the new settlers but destroyed in 1897. A two-foot (0.6 m) fragment of the second stone sits in Juniata College's museum.

== History ==
The first known inhabitants of the river valley were the Onojutta-Haga Indians. The valley was later inhabited by the Lenape until a treaty negotiated by William Penn opened the land to east of the Allegheny Ridge to white settlement. In 1755–1756, as a result of Lenape anger over loss of their lands, the white settlement in the valley suffered fierce raids and abductions from Lenape and Shawnee at Kittanning on the Allegheny River. Over 3,000 white settlers were killed in the raids. The burning of Fort Granville at present-day Lewistown in 1756 prompted Pennsylvania governor John Penn to launch a reprisal against the Lenape and Shawnee led by Lt. Col. John Armstrong, who burned Kittanning in September 1756.

During the 19th century, the river was paralleled by the Juniata Division Canal, part of the canal system of Pennsylvania and a rival to the Erie Canal. The state sold the canal to the Pennsylvania Railroad, which abandoned the canal in 1889 after severe flooding. Parts of the original locks from the canal, as well as remnants of a dam approximately 1 mile (2 km) south of Millerstown, are still visible today.

The river is a popular destination for recreational canoeing and fly fishing, in particular for smallmouth bass and channel catfish suited to the river's gentle course. The muskellunge was introduced as predatory sport fish and is now a prized catch. Attempts are underway by the state to reintroduce the once-prevalent American shad, which went into decline largely because of dams on the river. Walleye is another game fish prevalent in the Juniata River.

The National Book Award and Pulitzer prize-winning poet Galway Kinnell wrote of the river in a section of The Book of Nightmares (1971), entitled "Dear Stranger, Extant in Memory by the Blue Juniata" ("The Blue Juniata" was a well-known 19th-century parlor song).

The river cuts through several southwest-to-northeast ridges, largely of sandstone between limestone valley floors. Several of the river's tributaries, including Kishacoquillas Creek, are degraded by pollution, but the main stem of the river is considered fairly clean by regional standards. The only city in the watershed with ten thousand or more residents is Altoona. Steep slopes along much of the river's course have largely discouraged widespread development.

== Gallery ==
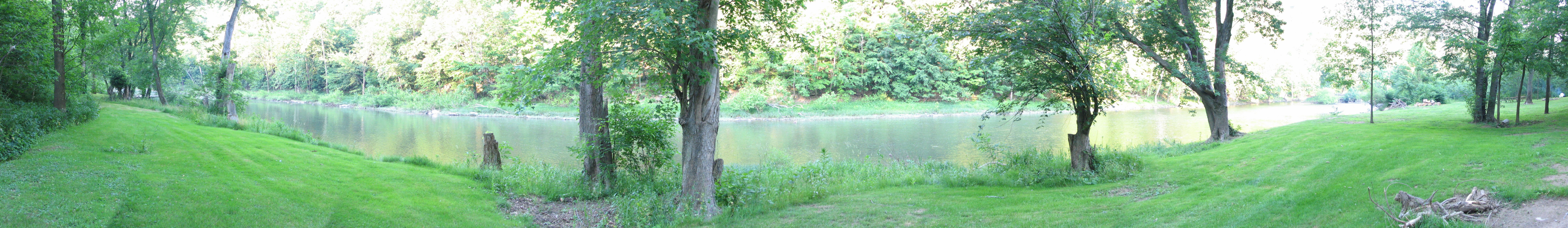
Panoramic view of the Juniata River. Taken in the summer of 2006, a couple of miles downstream from Riddlesburg, PA.

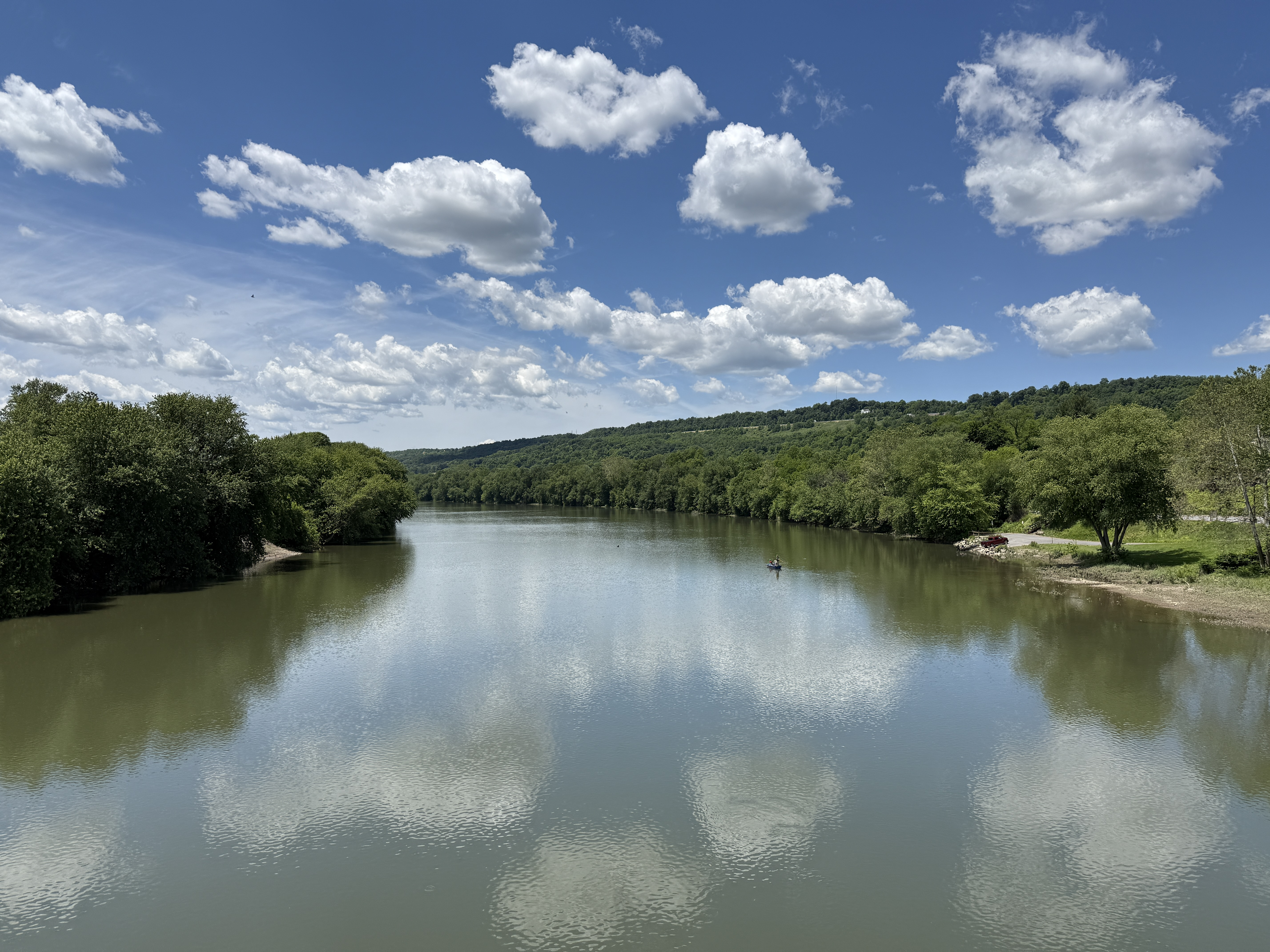
The Juniata River by Lewistown, Pennsylvania

== See also ==
- List of rivers of Pennsylvania
- Bloody Run Canoe Classic
- Heirline Covered Bridge

== Bibliography ==
- Kaylor, Earl C. 1996. Martin Grove Brumbaugh: A Pennsylvanian's Odyssey from Sainted Schoolman to Bedeviled World War I Governor, 1862–1930. Fairleigh Dickinson University Press.
- McIlnay, Dennis P. 2003. Juniata, river of sorrows: One Man's Journey Into a River's Tragic Past. Seven Oaks Press.
