= Williamsburg, Pennsylvania =

Borough in Pennsylvania, United States

- Borough
- Motto: Small Town, Big History
- Location of Williamsburg in Blair County, Pennsylvania.

- Location within Pennsylvania
- Coordinates: 40°27′42″N 78°12′14″W
- Country: United States
- State: Pennsylvania
- County: Blair
- Settled: 1790
- Incorporated: 1827

Government
  - Type: Borough

Area
  - Total: 0.37 sq mi (0.95 km^{2})
  - Land: 0.37 sq mi (0.95 km^{2})
  - Water: 0 sq mi (0.00 km^{2})
- Elevation: 846 ft (258 m)

Population (2020)
  - Total: 1,241 ▼
  - Estimate (2021): 1,230
  - Density: 3,215.2/sq mi (1,241.39/km^{2})
- Time zone: UTC-5 (Eastern (EST))
  - Summer (DST): UTC-4 (EDT)
- Zip Code: 16693
- Area codes: 814, 582
- FIPS code: 42-85272
- GNIS feature ID: 1214947
- Website: sites.google.com/site/williamsburgpennsylvania/home

Williamsburg in Morrisons Cove, is a borough in Blair County, Pennsylvania, United States. The population was 1,241 at the 2020 census. It is part of the Altoona, PA Metropolitan Statistical Area

== History ==
Before the first settlers arrived in the vicinity of what was later called the Big Spring, this area was part of the hunting grounds of the Lenape and Shawnee. On July 6, 1754, a treaty was signed at Albany, New York between the Iroquois and the William Penn heirs, opening up portions of the west for settlement. However, British policy forbidding western expansion was in effect until after the American Revolution.

The massacre of Captain William Phillips' Rangers took place near Williamsburg in July 1780. Ten men were murdered after surrendering to a party of Indians.

On September 17, 1789, George Reynolds took out a patent from the Supreme Executive Council of Pennsylvania for a large tract of unsettled land surrounding the Big Spring which flows into the Juniata River.

The borough was founded in 1790 by Jacob Ake. Originally called Aketown, it is the oldest borough in the current borders of Blair County. The name change was in honor of William Ake, Jacob's son. By 1810, there were 34 houses in the village; the census of 1820 notes an inn, a distillery, and the presence of one slave. The Main Line of the Pennsylvania Canal was completed in 1832 and opened on November 28 when the packetboat "John Blair" left Huntingdon, for the west. The Blair County Children's Home was located in Williamsburg for many years until its destruction by fire. Today, the borough is approximately 30 blocks, centered on High and Second Streets. This comprises the Williamsburg Historic District, listed by the National Register of Historic Places in 1995. Nearby places also listed are Etna Furnace, 5 miles (8 km) to the north, and the Daniel Royer House, 5 miles (8 km) to the southwest in Royer.

Originally served by a canal along the Frankstown Branch Juniata River, the canal was abandoned in 1872. In the following year, the Pennsylvania Railroad completed a branch line from Hollidaysburg to Williamsburg along the old canal towpath. It would eventually be extended to Petersburg in 1900, completing a bypass of the main line known as the Hollidaysburg and Petersburg Branch. The railroad supplied passenger service on the branch until 1933. Freight service would continue until 1982, when Conrail abandoned the line through Williamsburg. It is now the Lower Trail (vide infra).

The Blair County Children's Home, established in 1902, was located in Williamsburg, PA for many years until it was destroyed by fire on Aug. 2, 1975.

== Geography ==
According to the U.S. Census Bureau, Williamsburg has a total area of 0.4 square miles (1.0 km^{2}), all land. According to the U.S. Geological Survey, Williamsburg and the surrounding area sits on a 550 feet thick bed of sandstone, divided into medina white, red, and gray, with beds of red shale. Below that is the Oneida band, a 500 foot thick bed of greenish gray, iron speckled and very hard sandstone.

Williamsburg is accessed by Pennsylvania Route 866, approximately fifteen miles from Altoona to the west and thirteen miles from Huntingdon to the east. The streets are laid out in a grid pattern; going from the Frankstown Branch southward are First (or Front) Street, Second Street, Third Street, and Fourth Street (east side of the borough only). Union Street and Academy Alley/Sage Hill Drive follow the same direction of Fourth Street, if it continued. The main street is High Street, which runs through the center of the borough. Going east from High Street are Spring, Liberty, and Locust Streets; going west are Plum, Black, and Taylor Streets, with Dean Street just over the municipal line in Woodbury Township.

Union Street was named in honor of the federal union; Liberty Street for American liberty. Locust and Plum were named for trees. Black, Taylor and Dean were named for three Blair County judges born in Williamsburg. Academy Alley borders the school property. A small cross street along the eastern side of the high school, is named Blue Pirate Street, after the school mascot.

The Frankstown Branch of the Juniata River borders the borough. Piney Creek flows into this river to the west of the borough, and Clover Creek to the east. Across the river is Robeson Extension, usually considered part of Williamsburg, but actually lying in Catharine Township. Street names from the borough extend into the Extension, with the addition of Recreation Drive (borders the ballfields) and Home Street (borders Grace Pointe Community Church, former site of the Blair County Children's Home). The Williamsburg Farm show is held at the complex in Robeson Extension.

Approaching Williamsburg on Route 866 from the northwest, after crossing the Frankstown Branch two natural landmarks can be seen on the left. One is locally named Indian Rocks and is a series of exposed ridges of tall chimney like stone formations (one larger than the others). The other is a flat rock outcropping locally named Table Rock. Native American legends are associated with these rock formations. A hiker standing on top of Table Rock has a view over the entire town.

On the south side of Williamsburg is a large natural spring locally named the Big Spring. This water source is the reason steel tycoon Charles Schwab wanted to build a steel mill in Williamsburg. Ultimately, Schwab built a paper mill and a housing development on the east side of Williamsburg, referred to as Schwab Town in the early years. The Big Spring is a favorite photography location for wedding parties.

Wilmer Stultz was born on a farm on Piney Creek Road, south of Williamsburg. After his father died when he was age 14, his mother moved with Wilmer into Williamsburg where they lived on Spring Street (named after the Big Spring). He was an aviator who piloted Amelia Earhart, the first woman to fly across the Atlantic, as a passenger across the Atlantic. In July 1928, Earhart accompanied Stultz to Williamsburg, where a gigantic welcome celebration was held including Stultz, Earhart, and Lou Gordon riding through the town in an open convertible and accompanied by state police escorts. In July 1929, Earhart attended Stultz's funeral in Williamsburg after he died in an airplane accident on Long Island. He is buried, with his wife, in the Presbyterian Cemetery near the Big Spring.

== Demographics ==
Historical population
Census	Pop.	Note	%±
1820	268		—
1840	637		—
1850	747		17.3%
1860	798		6.8%
1870	821		2.9%
1880	566		−31.1%
1900	935		—
1910	1,523		62.9%
1920	1,872		22.9%
1930	1,898		1.4%
1940	1,898		0.0%
1950	1,792		−5.6%
1960	1,792		0.0%
1970	1,579		−11.9%
1980	1,400		−11.3%
1990	1,456		4.0%
2000	1,345		−7.6%
2010	1,254		−6.8%
2020	1,233		−1.7%
2021 (est.)	1,230	▼	−0.2%

As of the census of 2010, there were 1,254 people, 535 households, and 324 families residing in the borough. The population density was 3,135 people per square mile. There were 578 housing units at an average density of 1445 per square mile. The racial makeup of the borough was 98.4% White, 0.6% African American, 0.1% Native American, 0.2% Asian, and 0.8% from two or more races. Hispanic or Latino of any race were 1.0% of the population. The population age was spread out, with 23.6% under the age of 18, 59.5% from 18 to 64, and 16.9% who were 65 years of age or older. The median age of the population is 39½. 46.7% of the population is male.

There were 535 family households, out of which 27.9% had children under the age of 18 living with them. 41.3% were married couples Husband and wife both present, 14.4% had a female householder with no husband present, and 39.4% were non-families. 34.2% of all households were made up of individuals, and 18.5% had someone living alone who was 65 years of age or older. The average household size was 2.33 and the average family size was 2.98.

In 2010, there were 578 housing units within the borough. Of these 535, or 92.6% were occupied, leaving an overall vacancy rate of 7.4%. The owner-occupied vacancy rate was 1.8% and the rental vacancy rate was 6.1% of total available units. Approximately 60% of the units in the borough are owner occupied, with the remaining 40% rentals. The median price for a house is $78,000, and the average rental unit goes for $466/mo. The median income for a household in the borough was $27,877, and the median income for a family was $35,633. The per capita income for the borough was $18,403. About 20.2% of the population were below the poverty line, nearly double that of the previous Census in 2000. The Williamsburg cost of living index is 92.4, well below the national average. 84.4% of the population age 25 or older has at least a high school diploma.

== Government ==
Williamsburg has a mayor-council form of government. Recent mayors:

- Jean Kifer
- Harold Mardis
- Dennis Hammel
- William Brantner 2004-2008
- John Traxler 2008 (resigned)
- Ted Hyle 2008-

== Education ==
The first school in Williamsburg was founded and taught by Jacob Ake, the borough's founder.

Williamsburg Community School District is one of Pennsylvania's smallest. The superintendent is Lisa Murgas, and the school board is headed by Dr. Barry England. The current principal of the high school is Jennifer Fredrick. There are two buildings in use in the district: one for grades K-6, and one for grades 7-12. The high school mascot is the Blue Pirate. Sports offered at the high school include cross country, track and field, football, baseball, basketball for both sexes, and volleyball and softball for girls. Both the boys and girls basketball teams have won state championships.

The Williamsburg Public Library opened on January 28, 1950. The library was located in a back room of the Williamsburg Borough Building and was open on Tuesdays and Saturday evenings from 7 to 9. Members of the Women's Civic Club served as volunteer librarians. The Head Librarian is Lugene Shelly.

In 1968 the library moved to the former Patterson home on West Second Street, and in December 2001 it moved again to the former Presbyterian Church building. In 1966 the library became a member of the Blair County Library System. It currently serves the residents of Williamsburg, Catharine and Woodbury townships, and parts of Huston and Frankstown townships. The library provides a variety of programs, including story hours, book discussions, and poetry readings and is open five days a week. The library has a twelve-station computer lab with high-speed Internet and a community meeting room. The library's collection has thousands of books covering a wide variety of topics.

Williamsburg is served by Fire Station 90, located adjacent to the borough hall. It is a full-service volunteer outfit; by 2020, the local ambulance services had been discontinued - instead, being provided Emergency Medical Services from the nearby town of Hollidaysburg. Hazardous material response is provided by Altoona.

== Recreation ==
The Lower Trail (pronounced like "power") is a rail trail that passes through Williamsburg. The Williamsburg trailhead allows the user to access to Alexandria, 11 miles (18 km) east, and Flowing Springs, 5 miles (8 km) west. The trail is crushed limestone (paved through and near the borough) with grass on both sides. The Lower Trail offers access to the Frankstown Branch along much of its length. The river is a prime fishing location for trout and other game fish. Many historical points of interest, especially involving the Pennsylvania Canal and the Pennsylvania Railroad, are located along the trail. Other trailheads are in Ganister and Mount Etna.

The Mid State Trail overlaps the Lower Trail in Williamsburg and exits via borough streets to the ridgetop of Tussey Mountain. The trail is marked with red-orange blazes on utility poles through the borough and Woodbury Township. Once off-road, the blazes appear on trees along the trail. The trail runs from the New York line to the Maryland line, with planned extensions both north and south. There are also a few spur trails on the system.

The Upper Juniata River Water Trail passes through Williamsburg. Currently mapped from the Juniata's confluence with the Susquehanna up to Flowing Spring, the water trail offers boaters, especially canoe and kayak enthusiasts, over 120 miles (190 km) of river recreation. There is a carry-in/out boat access point in Williamsburg at the Lower Trail trailhead. Trail managers are looking to extend the trail upstream to the White Bridge behind Geeseytown.

== Sports ==
- The Junior High Lady Pirates won the Juniata Valley League basketball championship in 2006. (17-2)
- The Williamsburg Blue Pirates Varsity Football Team (2006) ended a 16-game losing streak with a win against Tussey Mountain. The team record for the year was 2-8. Jr. High 4-4
- The Williamsburg Blue Pirate Basketball Team (2008) won the Juniata Valley League Championship. They ended their season at 20-6.

== Events ==
The Blair County Allied Firefighters convention, with parade and fireworks, was held in Williamsburg at Riverside Park in 2006. The Williamsburg Community Farm Show is held annually, usually near the end of August. Rides and a midway are also provided; this event was previously known as Old Home Week. The Barnes and Carson Circus came to Williamsburg on 8/5/2006. This was the second time in five years a big top has been raised. Historically, the Adam Forepaugh Circus visited Williamsburg on May 5, 1871.

== The arts ==
Residents of Williamsburg engage in many arts and crafts. Craft shows occur when artisans sell their work. Some of the media worked in include pottery, leathercraft, metal, and wood. Local cabinetmakers craft fine wood furniture. The local library has sponsored a poetry coffeehouse on several occasions, and Royer Mansion has hosted readings from local literacy and writer's societies.

Musically, the high school band has won awards. The band traveled to Dublin, Ireland, in the early 1970s to play in the St. Patrick's Day parade, and won first place. The band also went to Israel in the 70s. Today, musicians, individually and in small groups, play everything from bluegrass to heavy metal.

== Economy ==
The largest employer is Cenveo, in the northwest end of the borough. In 2011, Cenveo purchased the Williamsburg location of MeadWestvaco. In 2006, MeadWestvaco reopened the former Sweetheart/Fonda building as a new West Plant.

Other than the Cenveo plant and numerous small businesses, the most common industries for employment for Williamsburg residents are construction, forestry, agriculture, quarrying, education, and health care. Dairy cattle and other agricultural farms surround Williamsburg.

== Media ==
Williamsburg has no television or radio stations, nor a current newspaper. Past newspapers were the Williamsburg Tribune (in the 1800s); the Williamsburg Journal, owned by H.A. "Barney" and Charlotte Barnhart in the 1940s-1950s; the Williamsburg Focus (1960s-1990s) edited by Dr. Marion Morelli; and the Williamsburg Gap (1996). The Altoona Mirror, the Huntingdon Daily News, and the Morrisons Cove Herald all cover the Williamsburg area.

WJAC-TV (based in Johnstown) and WTAJ-TV (based in Altoona) cover Blair County extensively.

== Notable people ==
- James M. Bell, U.S. Army brigadier general, born in Williamsburg.
- Galen Hall, professional football player, raised in Williamsburg.
- Vaughn O. Lang, U.S. Army lieutenant general, born in Williamsburg.
- Charles M. Schwab, president of U.S. Steel, born in Williamsburg.
- Wilmer Stultz aircraft navigator, flew across the Atlantic Ocean with Amelia Earhart, born in Williamsburg
- D. Raymond Sollenberger, PA State Representative (1937-1950), born in Williamsburg
