= Frankstown Branch Juniata River =

River in Pennsylvania, United States

Coordinates: 40°25′56″N 78°21′30″W

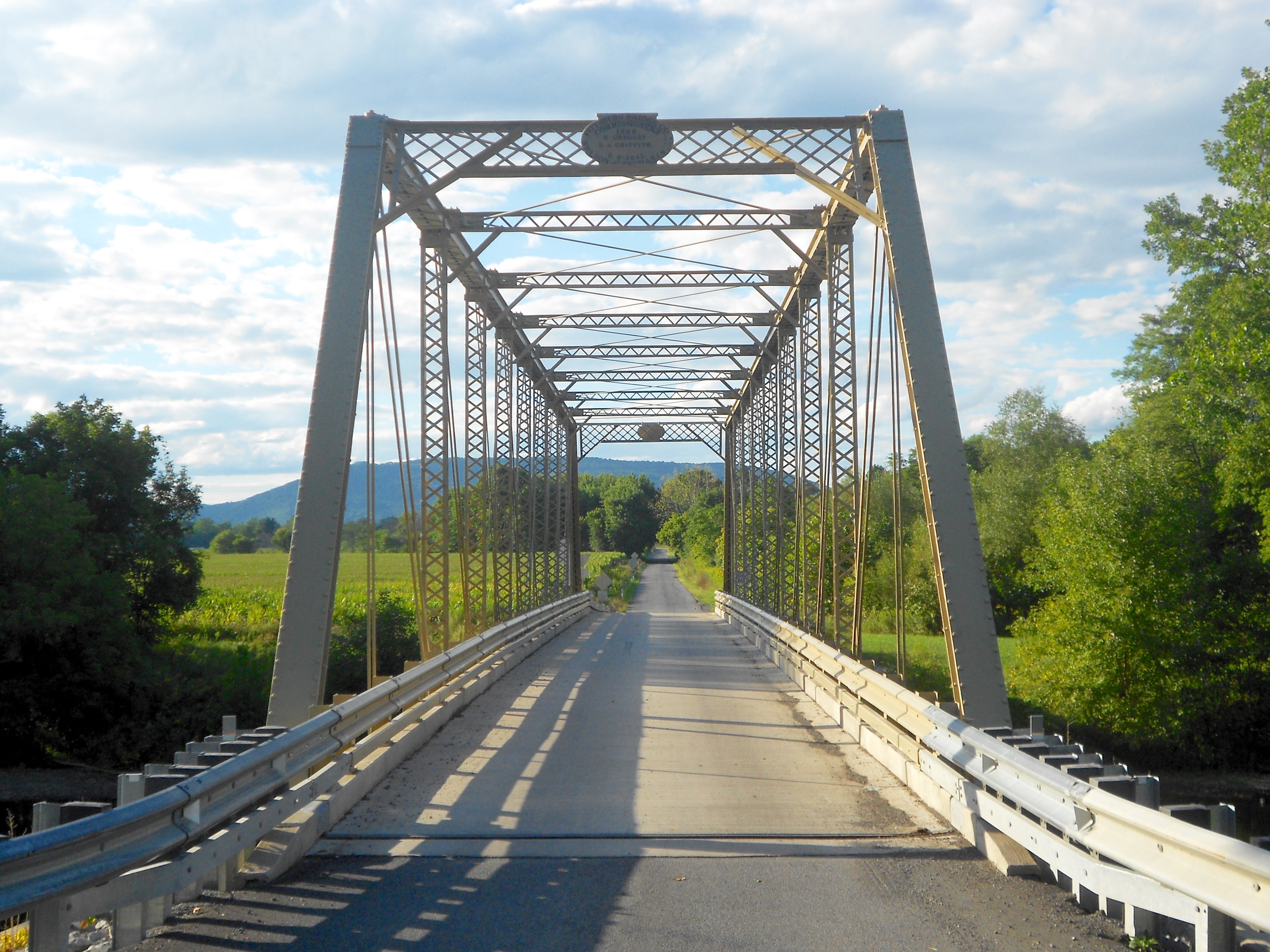
The Neff Bridge, spanning the Frankstown Branch northwest of Huntingdon

The Frankstown Branch Juniata River is a 46.0-mile-long (74.0 km) tributary of the Juniata River in Blair and Huntingdon counties, Pennsylvania, in the United States.

The headwater tributaries of the Frankstown Branch rise on the slopes of the Allegheny Front south of Altoona. The Frankstown Branch forms at the village of Claysburg by the confluence of Beaverdam Creek and South Poplar Run, then flows north along the western base of Dunning Mountain. Passing just east of Hollidaysburg, the river turns east briefly at Frankstown before heading northeast along the western base of Lock Mountain. Turning southeast at Point View, the river breaks through the mountain in a water gap and passes Williamsburg, then turns north again, now against the western base of Tussey Mountain. At Water Street, the river again turns east to break through a water gap, then passes the borough of Alexandria before joining the Little Juniata River to form the main stem of the Juniata River.

The Warrior Ridge Dam and Hydroelectric Plant is located on the Frankstown Branch in Logan Township and Porter Township in Huntingdon County.

== Tributaries ==
- Clover Creek, in Cove Forge
- Piney Creek, west of Williamsburg
- Fox Run, forming the border of Blair and Huntingdon counties
- Roaring Run, north of Mount Etna
- Yellow Spring Run, south of Mount Etna
- Canoe Creek, dammed to form Canoe Lake within Canoe Creek State Park
- Beaverdam Branch of the Juniata River, flowing into the Frankstown branch south of Frankstown
- Poplar Run, east of Newry
- McDonald Run, south of Newry
- Halter Creek, south of Newry
- Polecat Run, north of Claysburg
- Pawpaw Run, south of East Freedom
- Robinson Run (Shoop Rill), from East Loop Southeast of Frankstown
- South Dry Run, at East Freedom
- Oldtown Run, from the West Loop area in Hollidaysburg

== See also ==
- List of rivers of Pennsylvania
