= List of mountains of the Alleghenies =

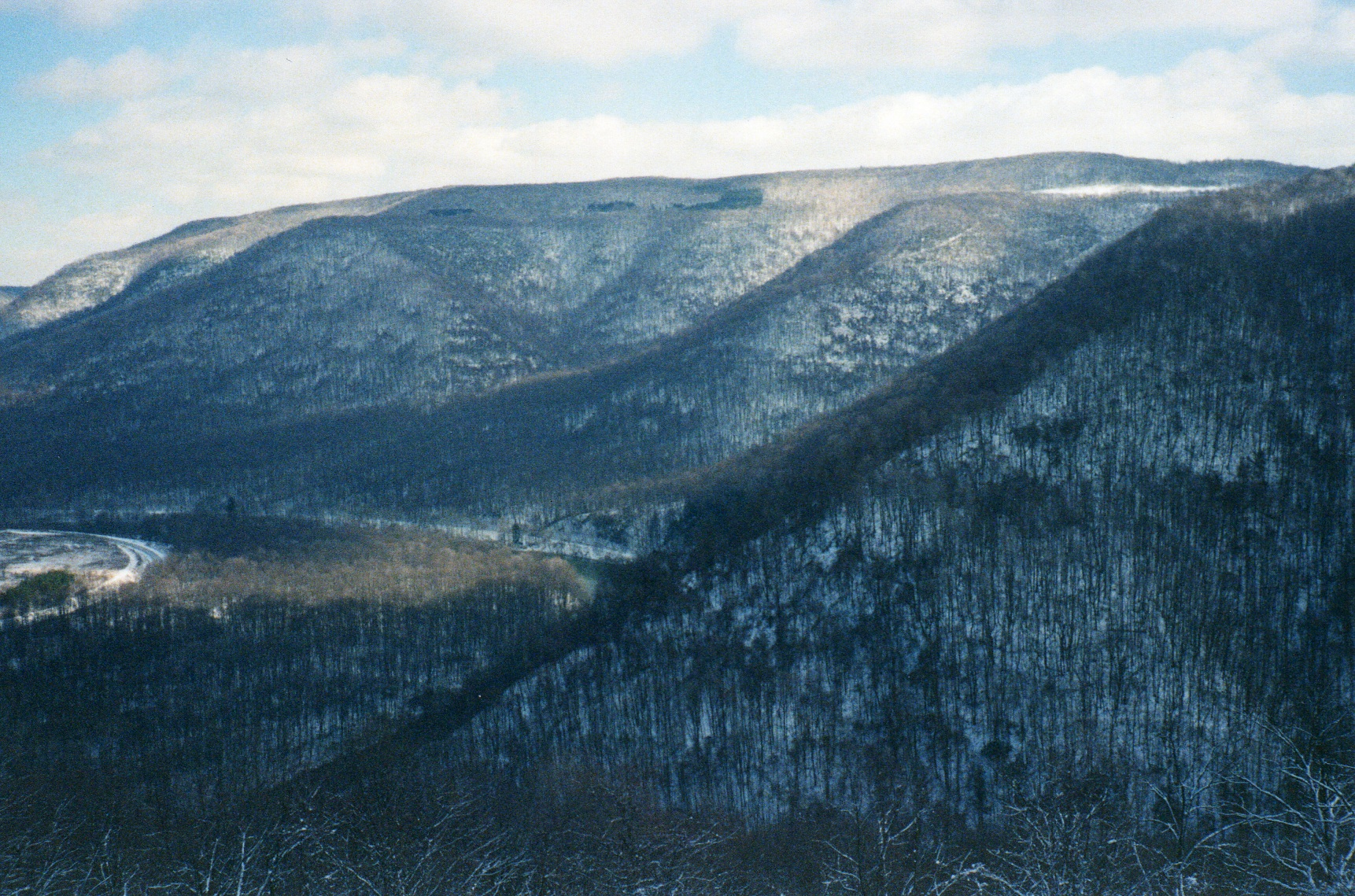
Laurel Hill in Ohiopyle State Park in Pennsylvania; the gorge is 1,700 ft, where the Youghiogheny River cuts through the mountains.

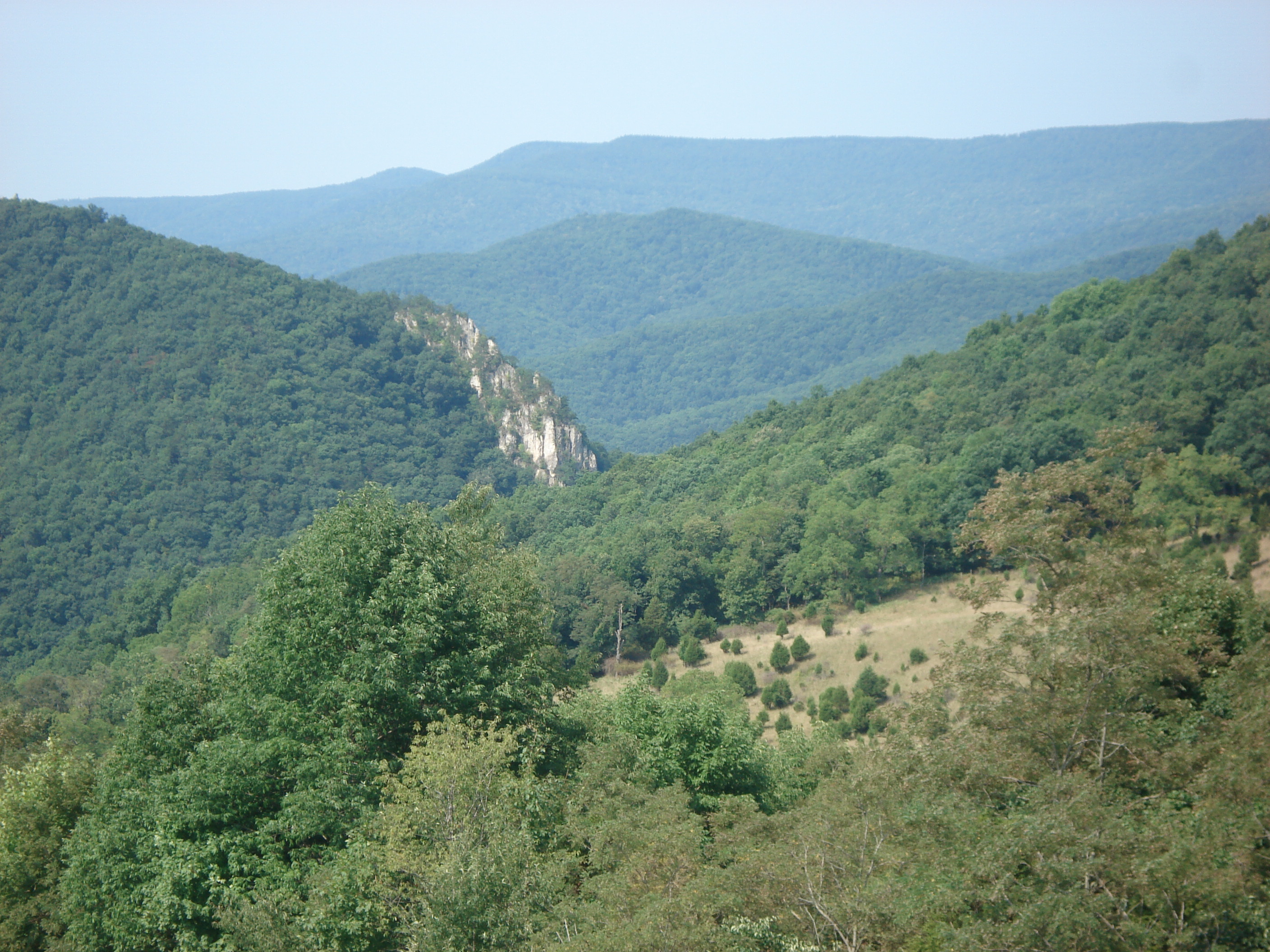
Spruce Mountain, visible behind Judy Rocks, in eastern West Virginia; the summit of Spruce Mountain, Spruce Knob, is the highest point in the Alleghenies at 4,863 feet (1,482 meters).

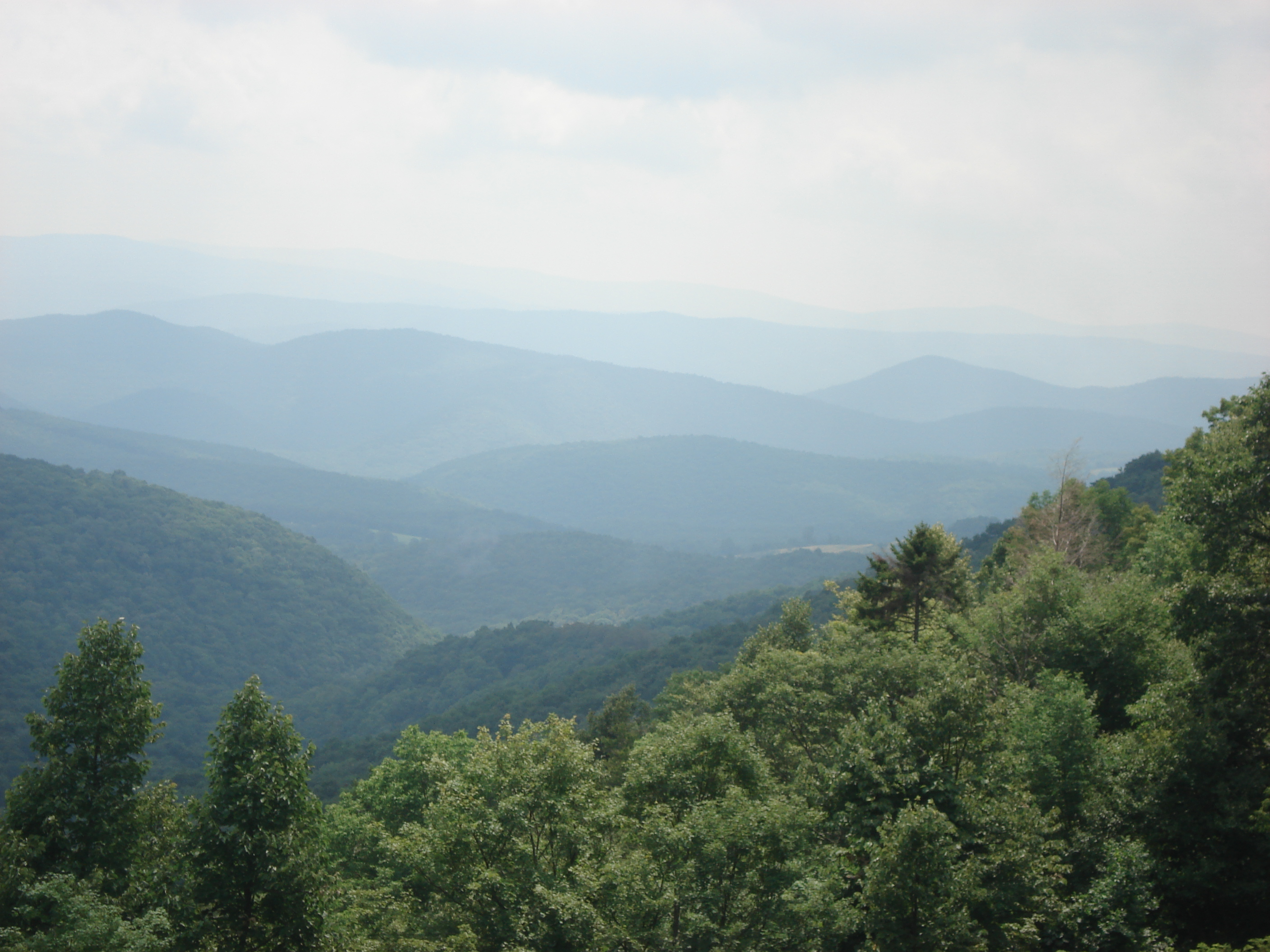
Allegheny Mountains in the Monongahela National Forest of West Virginia seen from the slopes of Back Allegheny Mountain looking east. Visible are Allegheny Mountain (middle distance) and Shenandoah Mountain (far distance).

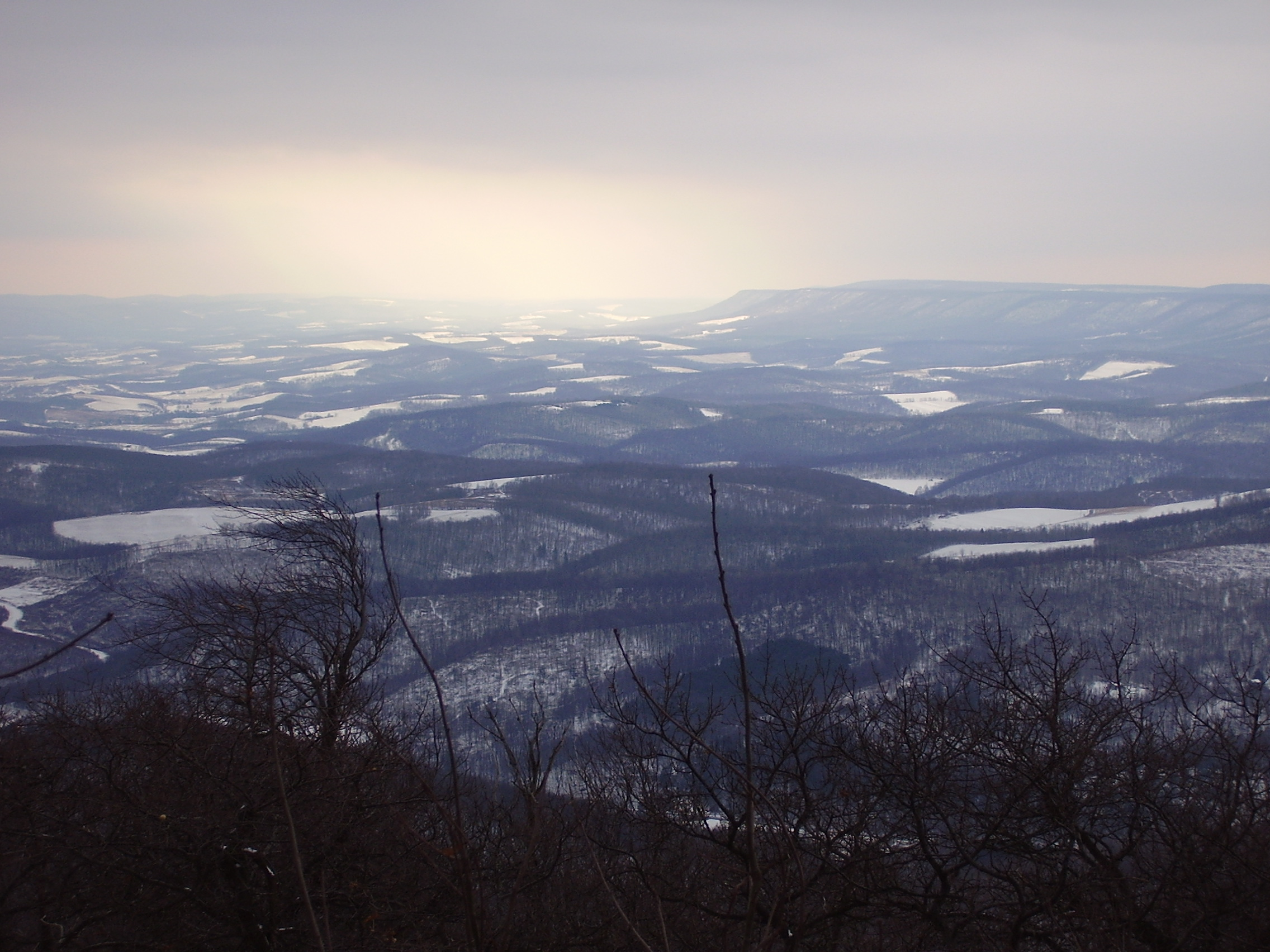
The Allegheny Front seen in the right of this photograph Blue Knob in Pennsylvania and its wintry valley below

This list of ridges and summits of the Allegheny Mountains identifies geographic elevations for about 500 miles (800 km) from north central Pennsylvania, through eastern West Virginia and western Maryland, to western Virginia in the United States.

The range of the Allegheny Mountains is part of the Ridge-and-Valley Appalachians, a physiographic region of the much larger Appalachian Mountain Range.

From northeast to southwest, with ridges and summits of the Eastern Continental Divide in italics:

- Bald Eagle Mountain, Pennsylvania
- Wopsononock Mountain, Pennsylvania
- Brush Mountain, Pennsylvania
- Pine Knob, Pennsylvania
- Blue Knob, Pennsylvania
- Tussey Mountain, Pennsylvania
- Cattle Knob, Pennsylvania
- Round Knob, Pennsylvania
- Ritchey Knob, Pennsylvania
- Schaefer Head, Pennsylvania
- Herman Point, Pennsylvania
- Laurel Highlands region (3 counties), Pennsylvania
  - Laurel Hill
  - Chestnut Ridge
- Wills Mountain, Pennsylvania, Maryland
- Laurel Mountain, Pennsylvania, Maryland
- Sleepy Creek Mountain, West Virginia
- Sideling Hill, West Virginia, Pennsylvania, Maryland
- Negro Mountain, Pennsylvania, Maryland
  - Mount Davis, Pennsylvania
- Allegheny Mountain (Pennsylvania) stratigraphic ridge, Pennsylvania
  - Allegheny Mountain, Bald Knob Summit (Pennsylvania): 2,906 feet
  - Grand View, MT. Ararat Lookout Point Pennsylvania 2,464 feet (751 m)40°2′14.66″N 78°45′30.13″W
  - Savage Mountain (Pennsylvania): 2,667 feet (813 m)39°53′11″N 78°44′10″W
- Savage Mountain stratigraphic ridge, Pennsylvania, Maryland
  - Big Savage Mountain summit, Pennsylvania: 2,566 feet (782 m)39°47′40″N 78°49′47″W
  - Big Savage Mountain summit, Maryland: 2,982 feet (909 m)39°32′39″N 79°05′46″W
  - Elbow Mountain, Pennsylvania, Maryland
- Allegheny Front (includes Dans Mountain)
- Little Allegheny Mountain, Pennsylvania, Maryland
- Dan's Mountain, Maryland: 2,898 feet (883 m)39°34′54″N 78°53′52″W
- Backbone Mountain, West Virginia, Maryland
- North Mountain, Virginia, West Virginia
- Great North Mountain, Virginia, West Virginia
- Tonoloway Ridge, Pennsylvania, Maryland, West Virginia
- Cacapon Mountain, West Virginia
- Third Hill Mountain, West Virginia
- Sleepy Creek Mountain, West Virginia
- Patterson Creek Mountain, West Virginia
- South Branch Mountain, West Virginia
- Ice Mountain, West Virginia
- Knobly Mountain, West Virginia
- Little Snaggy Mountain, Maryland
- Snaggy Mountain, West Virginia
- Briery Mountains, West Virginia
- Laurel Mountain, West Virginia
- Rich Mountain, West Virginia
- Mount Porte Crayon, West Virginia
- Canaan Mountain, West Virginia
- Cabin Mountain, West Virginia
- Brown Mountain, West Virginia
- North Fork Mountain, West Virginia
- River Knobs, West Virginia
- Shenandoah Mountain, West Virginia, Virginia
- Elleber Ridge, West Virginia
- Spruce Mountain, West Virginia
  - Spruce Knob, West Virginia
- Little Middle Mountain, West Virginia
- Allegheny Mountain, West Virginia, Virginia
- Middle Mountain, West Virginia
- Little Beech Mountain, West Virginia
- Beech Mountain, West Virginia
- Little Mountain, West Virginia
- Shaver's Fork Mountain Complex, West Virginia
  - Cheat Mountain
    - Barton Knob
    - White Top
  - Back Allegheny Mountain
    - Bald Knob
  - Shavers Mountain
    - Gaudineer Knob
  - Bickle Knob
  - McGowan Mountain
  - Elk Mountain
  - Middle Mountain
  - Green Mountain
- Black Mountain, West Virginia
- Gauley Mountain, West Virginia
- Yew Mountains, West Virginia
- Back Creek Mountain, Virginia
- Peters Mountain, West Virginia, Virginia

== See also ==
- List of mountains of the Appalachians
