= Klahr, Pennsylvania =

Unincorporated community in Pennsylvania, US

- Census-designated place
- Location within Pennsylvania Location within the United States
- Coordinates: 40°17′52″N 78°30′45″W
- Country: United States
- State: Pennsylvania
- County: Blair
- Township: Greenfield

Area
  - Total: 0.14 sq mi (0.35 km^{2})
  - Land: 0.14 sq mi (0.35 km^{2})
  - Water: 0 sq mi (0.00 km^{2})
- Elevation: 1,624 ft (495 m)

Population (2020)
  - Total: 76
  - Density: 560/sq mi (217/km^{2})
- Time zone: UTC-5 (Eastern (EST))
  - Summer (DST): UTC-4 (EDT)
- ZIP Code: 16625 (Claysburg)
- Area codes: 814/582
- FIPS code: 42-40072
- GNIS feature ID: 2805516

Klahr is an unincorporated community and census-designated place (CDP) in Blair County, Pennsylvania, United States. It was first listed as a CDP prior to the 2020 census.

== Geography ==
The CDP is in southwestern Blair County, in the southern part of Greenfield Township. It sits at the head of the valley of Smoky Run, at the base of Spruce Knob, an eastern spur of Blue Knob, the second-highest summit in Pennsylvania. Smoky Run is a southeastward-flowing tributary of Beaverdam Creek, one of the main headwater tributaries of the Frankstown Branch of the Juniata River, part of the Susquehanna River watershed.

Locust Hollow Road is the main street through Klahr, leading north 2 miles (3 km) to Ski Gap and southeast 2.5 miles (4.0 km) to Cotton Town. Claysburg is 5 miles (8 km) by road to the east, and Hollidaysburg is 20 miles (32 km) to the northeast.

== Demographics ==
Historical population
Census	Pop.	Note	%±
2020	76		—
U.S. Decennial Census

== Education ==
It is in the Claysburg-Kimmel School District.
