= Friesville, Pennsylvania =

Unincorporated community in Pennsylvania, US

- Census-designated place
- Location within Pennsylvania Location within the United States
- Coordinates: 40°17′40″N 78°27′49″W
- Country: United States
- State: Pennsylvania
- County: Blair
- Township: Greenfield

Area
  - Total: 0.15 sq mi (0.40 km^{2})
  - Land: 0.15 sq mi (0.40 km^{2})
  - Water: 0 sq mi (0.00 km^{2})
- Elevation: 1,221 ft (372 m)

Population (2020)
  - Total: 195
  - Density: 1,274.1/sq mi (491.93/km^{2})
- Time zone: UTC-5 (Eastern (EST))
  - Summer (DST): UTC-4 (EDT)
- ZIP Code: 16625 (Claysburg)
- Area codes: 814/582
- FIPS code: 42-27976
- GNIS feature ID: 2805503

Friesville is an unincorporated community and census-designated place (CDP) in Blair County, Pennsylvania, United States. It was first listed as a CDP prior to the 2020 census.

The CDP is in southern Blair County, in the eastern part of Greenfield Township. It is bordered to the east by Claysburg. It is on the south side of South Poplar Run, a stream which originates to the west on the north side of Blue Knob along the Allegheny Front and flows east to join Beaverdam Creek and form the Frankstown Branch Juniata River in Claysburg.

== Demographics ==
Historical population
Census	Pop.	Note	%±
2020	195		—
U.S. Decennial Census

== Education ==
It is in the Claysburg-Kimmel School District.
