= Butler Knob =

Mountain in Pennsylvania, United States

Coordinates: 40.29314°N 77.96696°W

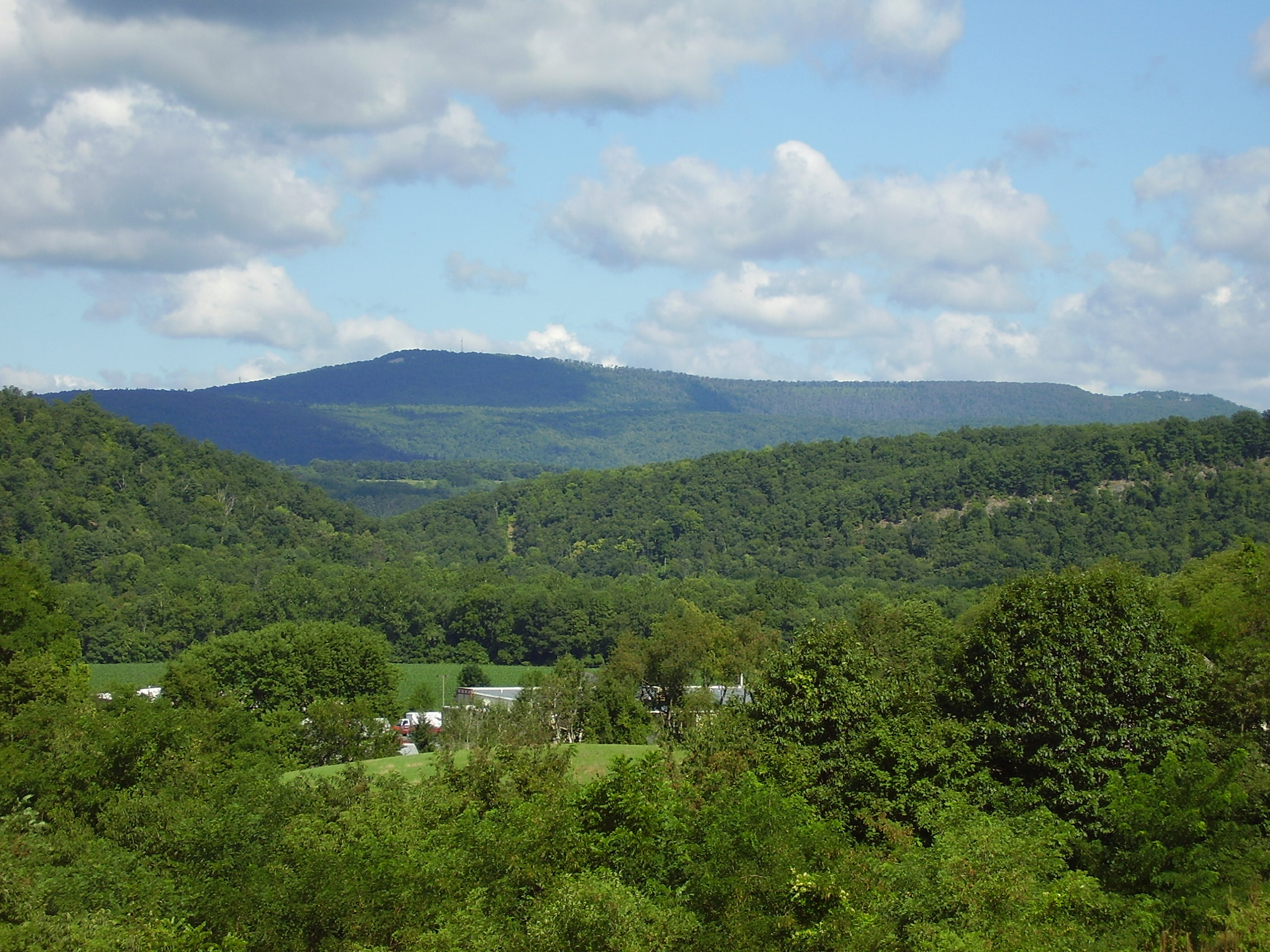
- Butler Knob

Highest point
- Elevation: 2,320 ft (710 m)

Geography
- Location: Huntingdon County, Pennsylvania, U.S.
- Parent range: Appalachian Mountains
- Topo map: USGS Butler Knob (PA)

Climbing
- First ascent: unknown
- Easiest route: drive up

Butler Knob is a peak on the Jacks Mountain ridge in south central Pennsylvania in the United States. The "Knobs" summit is underlain with weather resistant quartzite of the Tuscarora Formation (Silurian Age). Butler Knob is accessible by a rough road, where there is a closed firetower on the summit. The firetower presently hold a weather station that gives current forecasts for the area (see link below).

There are views available from a nearby scree slope. The views are mainly east, south and west from here; the summits of Big Mountain, Sideling Hill, Williamsburg Mountain and Blue Knob can be seen in the distance. Butler Knob is located within the Rothrock State Forest, all camping and activities on the mountain are subject to the rules and regulations of that agency.

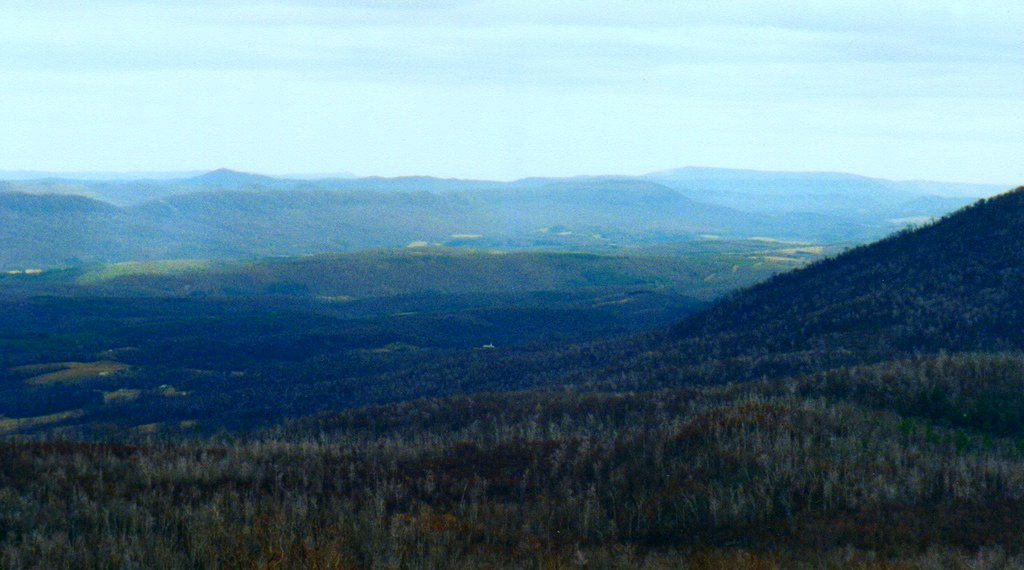
View east from summit of Butler Knob.
