= Ski Gap, Pennsylvania =

Unincorporated community in Pennsylvania, US

Ski Gap, Pennsylvania Fredericksburg
- Census-designated place
- Location within Pennsylvania Location within the United States
- Coordinates: 40°18′59″N 78°31′7″W
- Country: United States
- State: Pennsylvania
- County: Blair
- Township: Greenfield

Area
  - Total: 0.13 sq mi (0.34 km^{2})
  - Land: 0.13 sq mi (0.34 km^{2})
  - Water: 0 sq mi (0.0 km^{2})
- Elevation: 1,506 ft (459 m)
- Time zone: UTC-5 (Eastern (EST))
  - Summer (DST): UTC-4 (EDT)
- ZIP Code: 16625 (Claysburg)
- Area codes: 814/582
- FIPS code: 42-70996
- GNIS feature ID: 2807055

Ski Gap is a census-designated place (CDP) in Blair County, Pennsylvania, United States. It was first listed as a CDP prior to the 2020 census. The CDP corresponds to the unincorporated community of Fredericksburg, not to be confused with the Fredericksburg in the eastern part of Blair County.

The Ski Gap CDP is in southwestern Blair County, in the northwest part of Greenfield Township. It sits at the base of the Allegheny Front in the valley of South Poplar Run where it is joined from the north by Carson Run. Spruce Knob, an arm of Blue Knob, the second-highest mountain in Pennsylvania, rises to the south, while 2,700-foot (820 m) Pine Knob rises to the north.

Ski Gap Road leads southeast down the valley of South Poplar Run 4 miles (6 km) to Claysburg.

== Education ==
It is in the Claysburg-Kimmel School District.
