= Klahr =

Klahr is a surname. Notable people with the surname include:

- Alfred Klahr (1904–1944), Austrian historian and politician
- David Klahr (1939–2026), American psychologist
- Jerome Klahr Huddle (1891–1959), American diplomat
- Lewis Klahr (born 1956), American animator and filmmaker
- Marco Lara Klahr, Mexican professor and journalist

== See also ==
- Klahr, Pennsylvania, United States
