= Ritchey Knob =

Mountain in Pennsylvania, United States

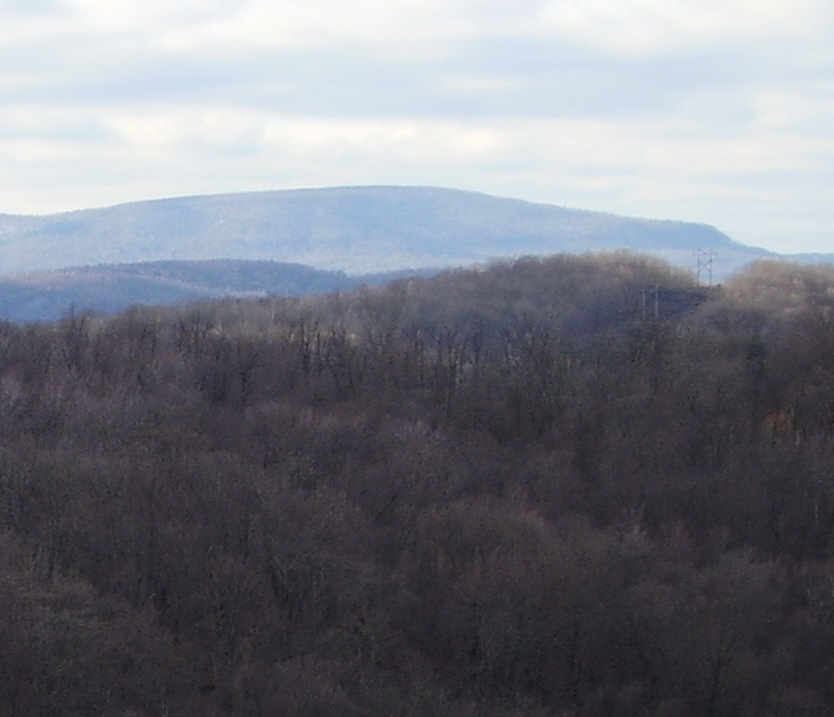
- Ritchey Knob on the Blue Knob massif

Highest point
- Elevation: 2,865 ft (873 m)
- Coordinates: 40°20′40.42″N 78°31′9.05″W

Geography
- Location: Blair County, Pennsylvania, U.S.
- Parent range: Allegheny Mountains
- Topo map: USGS Blue Knob (PA) Quadrangle

Climbing
- First ascent: unknown

Ritchey Knob is a summit located on the Blue Knob massif. This mountain is connected to Pine Knob and forms the northernmost summits of the massif.

Ritchey Knob is the fourth highest of this grouping behind Blue Knob 3,136 feet (956 m), Herman Point 3,034 feet (925 m) and Schaefer Head 2,950 feet (899 m).

Based on peakery data, it ranks as the 15th highest mountain in Pennsylvania and the 37,188th highest mountain in the United States.
