= Allegheny Mountain =

Allegheny Mountain may refer to:

- The Allegheny Mountains range in the eastern United States
  - Mountains within the range, including:
    - Allegheny Mountain (West Virginia-Virginia), or "Alleghany", demarcating much of the border between the two states
    - Allegheny Mountain (Pennsylvania) in southwestern Pennsylvania
    - The Allegheny Front, in Pennsylvania, Maryland, and West Virginia
- The Allegheny Escarpment, which forms the western edge of the Appalachians

== See also ==
- Back Allegheny Mountain
