= Sproul, Pennsylvania =

Unincorporated community in Pennsylvania, US

- Unincorporated community
- Location within Pennsylvania
- Coordinates: 40°16′20″N 78°27′30″W
- Country: United States
- State: Pennsylvania
- County: Blair
- Elevation: 1,253 ft (382 m)
- Time zone: UTC-5 (Eastern (EST))
  - Summer (DST): UTC-4 (EDT)
- ZIP code: 16682
- Area code: 814
- GNIS feature ID: 2807058

Sproul is an unincorporated community in Greenfield Township, Blair County, Pennsylvania, United States. The community is located along U.S. Route 220 Business, 10.5 miles (16.9 km) south of Duncansville. Sproul had a post office until September 28, 2002; it still has its own ZIP code, 16682.

== Education ==
It is in the Claysburg-Kimmel School District.
