= Cotton Town, Pennsylvania =

Unincorporated community in Pennsylvania, US

- Census-designated place
- Location within Pennsylvania Location within the United States
- Coordinates: 40°16′48″N 78°28′52″W
- Country: United States
- State: Pennsylvania
- County: Blair
- Township: Greenfield

Area
  - Total: 0.031 sq mi (0.08 km^{2})
  - Land: 0.031 sq mi (0.08 km^{2})
  - Water: 0 sq mi (0.00 km^{2})
- Elevation: 1,270 ft (390 m)

Population (2020)
  - Total: 22
  - Density: 744.3/sq mi (287.36/km^{2})
- Time zone: UTC-5 (Eastern (EST))
  - Summer (DST): UTC-4 (EDT)
- ZIP Codes: 16625 (Claysburg)
- Area codes: 814/582
- FIPS code: 42-16432
- GNIS feature ID: 2805479

Cotton Town is an unincorporated community and census-designated place (CDP) in Blair County, Pennsylvania, United States. It was first listed as a CDP prior to the 2020 census.

== Geography ==
The CDP is in southern Blair County, in the southeastern part of Greenfield Township. It is in the valley of Smoky Run, at the intersection of Cottontown/Lower Claar Road with Pine Hollow/Schellsburg Road. It is 2 miles (3 km) southwest of Claysburg via Pine Hollow Road. Altoona is 20 miles (32 km) to the north. Smoky Run is a southeastward-flowing tributary of Beaverdam Creek, one of the headwaters of the Frankstown Branch of the Juniata River, part of the Susquehanna River watershed.

== Demographics ==
Historical population
Census	Pop.	Note	%±
2020	22		—
U.S. Decennial Census

== Education ==
It is in the Claysburg-Kimmel School District.
