= Pine Knob (Pennsylvania) =

Mountain in Pennsylvania, United States

Coordinates: 40°19′56″N 78°30′54″W

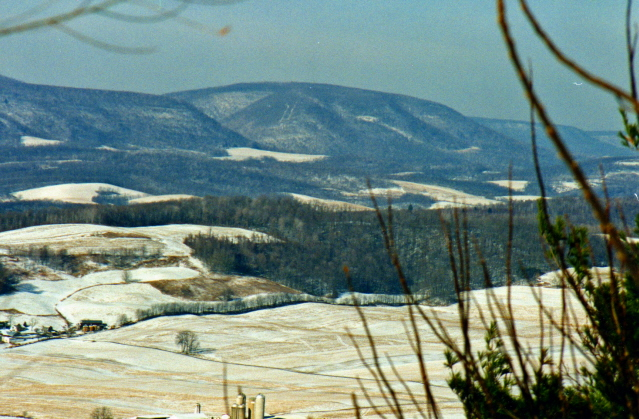
- View of Pine Knob from Evitts mountain

Highest point
- Elevation: 2,704 ft (824 m)

Geography
- Location: Blair County, Pennsylvania, U.S.
- Parent range: Allegheny Mountains

Pine Knob is a peak in the Allegheny Mountains of Pennsylvania. It is a satellite peak of its larger neighbor Blue Knob.

== Geography and notable features ==
At 2,704 ft (824 m) above sea level, this mountain is the lesser in elevation when compared to Schaefer Head (2,950 ft), Round Knob (2,791 ft), Cattle Knob (2,842 ft) and Ritchey Knob (2,865 ft). The latter is connected to Pine Knob; the saddle elevation between the peaks is 2,597 ft (792 m)

There are no roads or hiking trails to the top of Pine Knob. The town of Ski Gap, shown on older topo maps as "Fredericksburg," lies at the southern base of the mountain.

There is also a peak named Pine Knob in Fayette County, Pennsylvania (2,065 ft).
