= Little Snaggy Mountain =

Mountain in Maryland, United States

Little Snaggy Mountain is a summit in the range of Allegheny Mountains in Garrett County, Maryland, in the United States, with an elevation of 2,769 feet (844 meters).
