= Tuscarora Mountain =

Mountain in Pennsylvania

Coordinates: 40°14′12″N 77°44′18″W

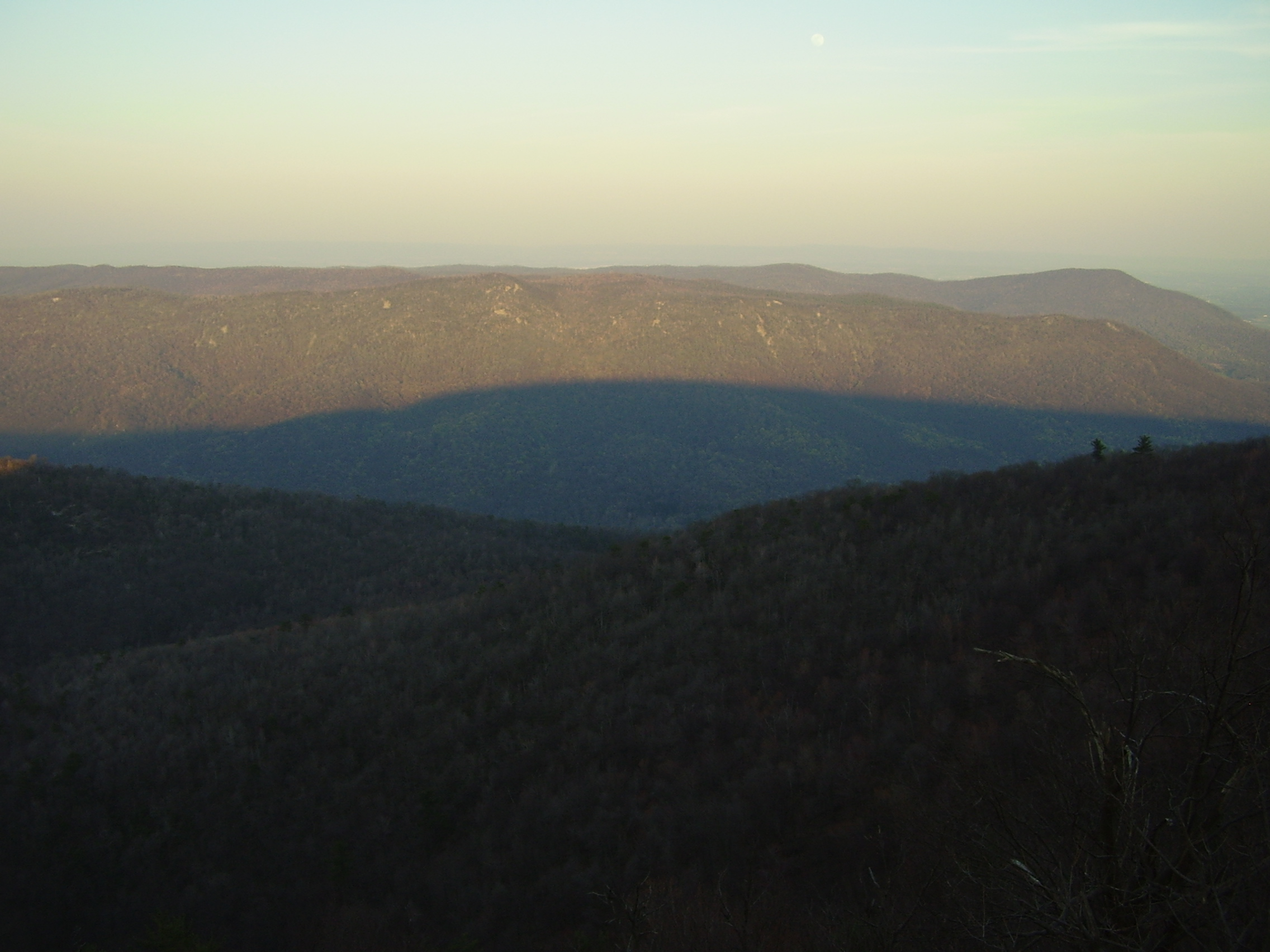
The shadow of Tuscarora Mountain on Kittatinny Mountain to the east, photo taken the Tuscarora summit

Tuscarora Mountain is a mountain ridge of the Appalachian Mountains in the Ridge and Valley province in central Pennsylvania. It reaches its highest point on Big Mountain (Pennsylvania) at 2,458 feet (749 m) above sea level. The mountain is named after the Tuscarora people.

The mountain runs from northeast to southwest, extending from the Juniata River at Millerstown in the north to the end of Cove Mountain at Cowans Gap in the south. Part of it forms the border between Fulton and Franklin counties.

Much of Pennsylvania State Game Lands 124 lies on Tuscarora Mountain.

Just north of Cowans Gap, the Pennsylvania Turnpike traverses the ridge through the Tuscarora Mountain Tunnel.

Geologically, the mountain is held up by the Tuscarora Formation.

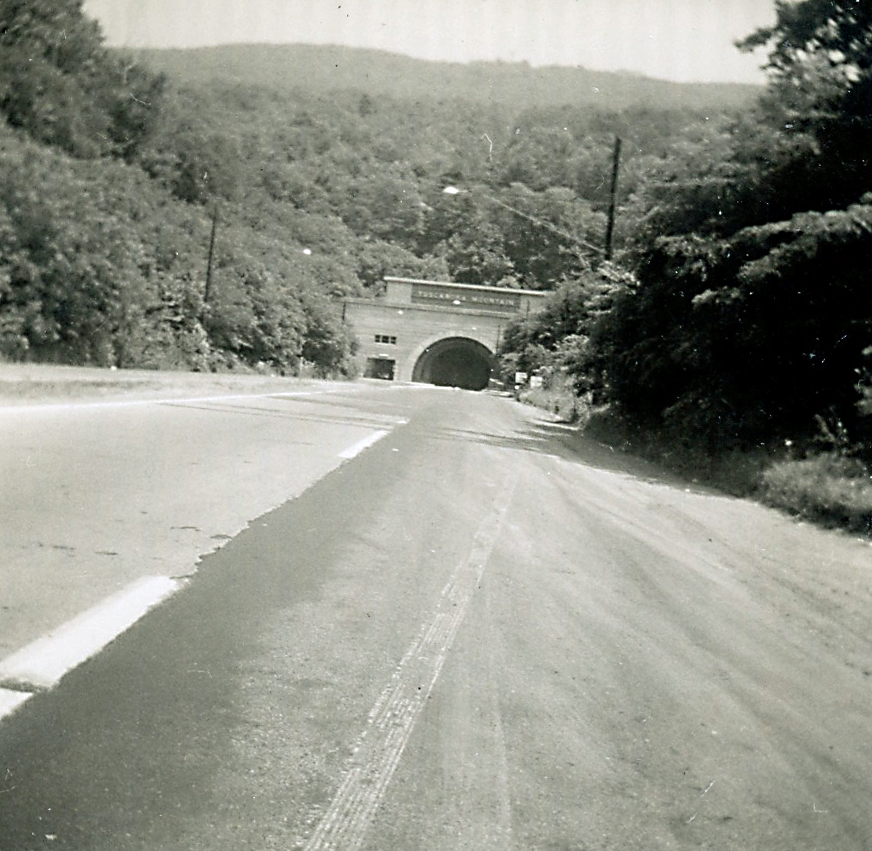
