= Elleber Ridge =

Coordinates: 38°25′43″N 79°43′22″W

Elleber Ridge is the name of a ridge in the Allegheny Mountains of West Virginia and it is also the name of the mountain's summit, Elleber Knob (4,595 ft). It is located in the eastern portion of Pocahontas County near the Virginia state line. The ridge and summit are located entirely in the Monongahela National Forest. Rattlesnake Trail runs from the base of the mountain to Elleber Knob. The summit is also accessible via Elleber Sods Road, which is maintained by the National Forest.

Elleber Knob is the highest point on the ridge and the highest point in the eastern half of the county.

The ridge derives its name from the plant white hellebore.
