= Williamsburg Mountain =

Mountain in Pennsylvania, United States

Coordinates: 40.49758°N 78.13224°W

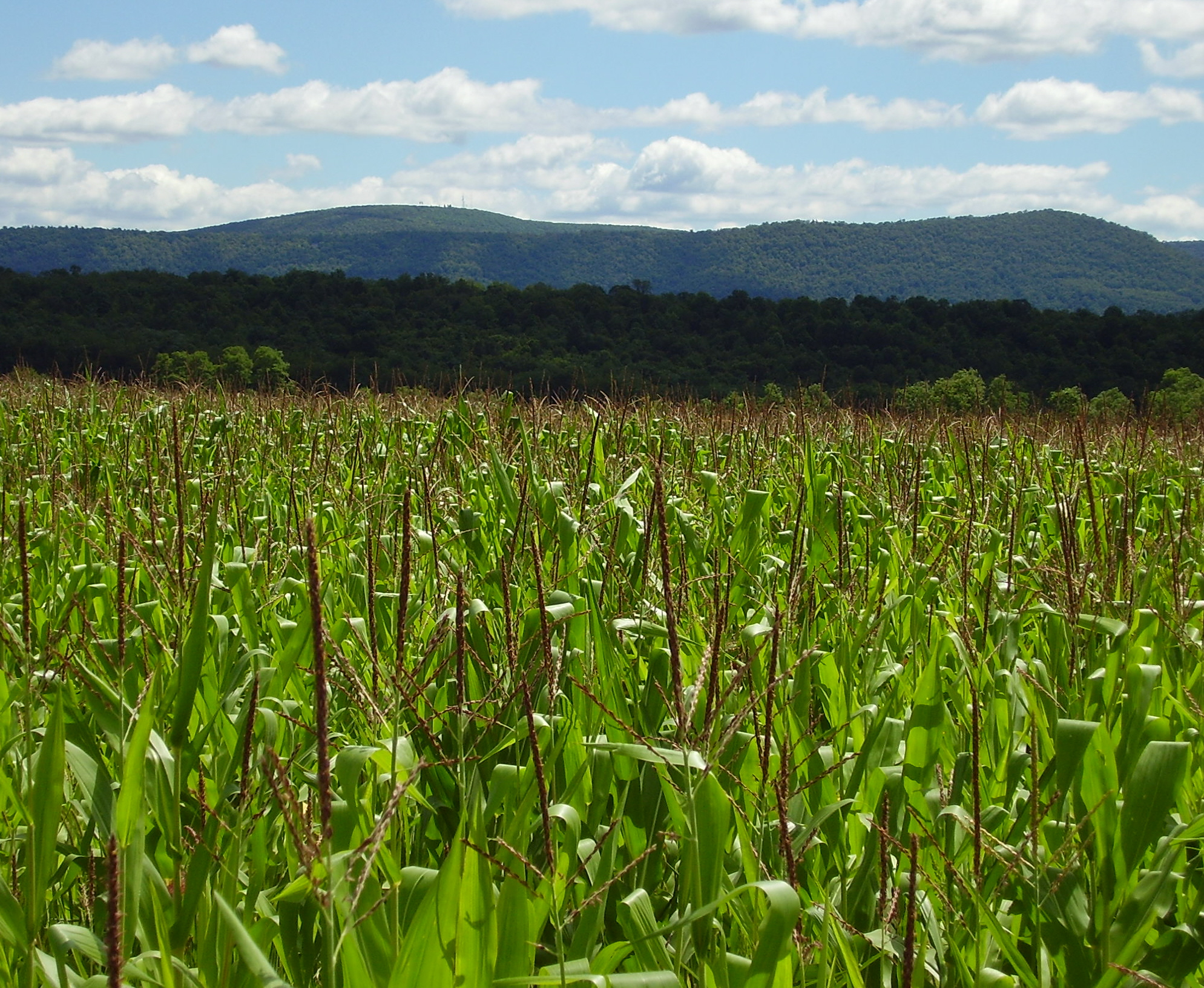
- Williamsburg Mountain (viewed from west)

Highest point
- Elevation: 2,350 ft (720 m)

Geography
- Location: Blair / Huntingdon counties, Pennsylvania, U.S.
- Parent range: Appalachian Mountains
- Topo map: Williamsburg Quad.

Climbing
- Easiest route: Drive then walk

Williamburg Mountain is a high "S" bend in the 100-mile-long (160 km) ridge of Tussey Mountain, in the Ridge-and-Valley Province of the Appalachian Mountains in central Pennsylvania.

The name "Williamsburg Mountain" is a local reference, after the town of Williamsburg, and does not appear on federal maps. The mountain is also referred to as "The Loop" because of its unique shape when viewed from the air. (This is not to be confused with Loop Mountain 13 miles (21 km) to the southwest, near Hollidaysburg.) The summit ridge rises to an elevation of 2,350 feet (720 m) above sea level, 1,500 feet (457 m) above Williamsburg and the Frankstown Branch of the Juniata River.

The summit of the mountain has an old lookout tower, which is now closed, and an array of communication towers. Pennsylvania Route 866 crosses the ridge less than a mile west of the summit, and it is possible to walk the access road to the summit towers. Pennsylvania State Game Lands 118 occupies the summit area of the mountain along with other parcels along the Tussey Mountain ridge.
