= Marco Lara Klahr =

Mexican journalist

Marco Lara Klahr is a Mexican professor and journalist. As of 2009, he has been a journalist for 29 years, focusing mainly on violence, crime and social conflicts in 15 countries. His reports have been published in different media, and several have been translated into many different languages, including English, Italian, Portuguese and German. He was the founder and director of the Violence and Media project (sponsored by the European Union) in Mexican NGO INSYDE, worked as a consultant for the Open Society Justice Initiative (an operational program of the Open Society Foundations) and now works as the Director of the Media Program at the Instituto de Justicia Procesal Penal.

Lara Klahr has authored numerous books and guides. His work lately focuses on improving journalistic quality and integrity in the difficult context of Latin America. For example, the book "No mas pagadores" is a guide for journalists on the new adversarial system of justice recently implemented in Mexico and the concept of presumption of innocence that is introduced as a result. The book's creation was supported by the Freedom of Expression organization Article 19, by the British Embassy in Mexico, and by the Open Society Justice Initiative.
