= Blue Knob (Pennsylvania) =

Mountain in Bedford County, Pennsylvania

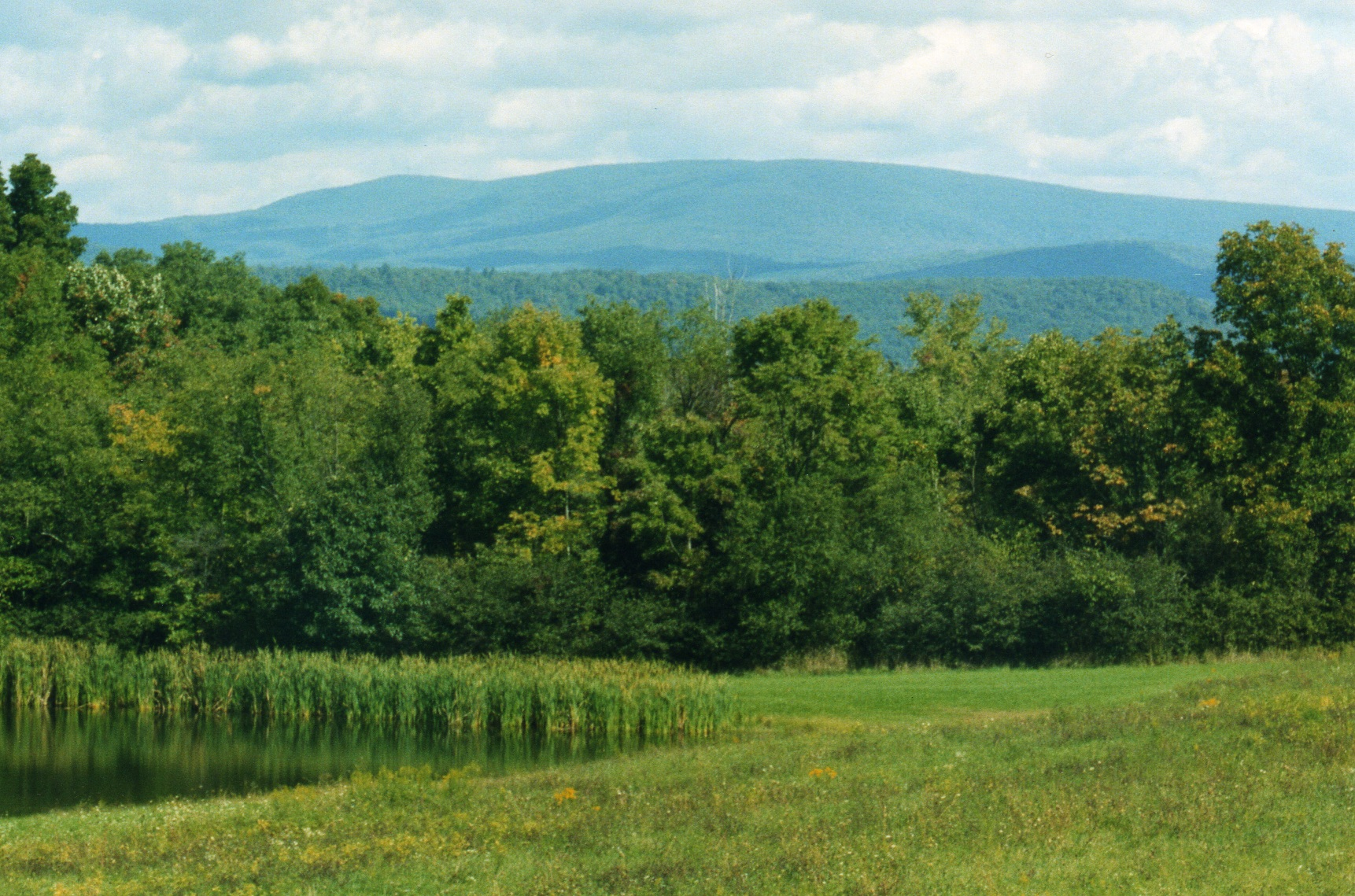

Highest point
- Elevation: 3,146 feet (959 m) NGVD 29
- Prominence: 800 ft (240 m)
- Coordinates: 40°17′18″N 78°33′42″W

Geography
- Location within the United States Location within Pennsylvania
- Location: Bedford County, Pennsylvania, U.S.
- Parent range: Allegheny Front
- Topo map: USGS Blue Knob

Climbing
- Easiest route: Drive-up via Knob Road

Blue Knob (elevation 3,146 feet (959 m)) is a summit in the eastern United States with a broad dome that is the northernmost 3,000-footer in the Allegheny Mountains. It is the highest point in Bedford County, Pennsylvania.

The mountain is the site of 5,874-acre (23.77 km^{2}) Blue Knob State Park and contains approximately 18 miles (29 km) of hiking trails and numerous overlooks. An alpine ski area is located on the mountain's north slopes. The towns of Pavia and Claysburg lie at the foot of the mountain, and Johnstown, Altoona, and Bedford are located within 25 miles (40 km).

== Geography ==
The satellite peaks of Blue Knob include: Herman Point 3,034 feet (925 m), Spruce Knob 2,475 ft (754 m), Round Knob 2,791 ft (851 m), Cattle Knob 2,842 ft (866 m), Pine Knob 2,704 ft (824 m), Ritchey Knob 2,865 ft (873 m) and Schaefer Head 2,950 ft (899 m).

Summits to the north include Brush Mountain (17 miles), Schaefer Head (2.5 miles) and the other satellite peaks listed above, The "Loop" in Tussey Mountain (27 miles) and Lock Mountain (13 miles).

To the east the views are of Dunning Mountain (7 miles), Tussey Mountain (16 miles), Jacks Mountain with Butler Knob (31 miles), Sideling Hill (28 miles), and on the distant horizon Big Mountain (41 miles) and the Tuscarora Mountain Ridge. To the south are Wills Mountain (32 miles), Savage Mountain (28 miles) and Bald Knob on the Allegheny Front (20 miles). The town of Bedford is hidden by Kinton Knob (18 miles).

The views west include Laurel Hill with the Conemaugh Gorge (22 miles), and the Allegheny Plateau.

Drainages

A few of the major streams are Big Lick Branch, Rhodes Run, Pavia Run, Deep Hollow Run, Scubgrass Creek, Beaverdam Creek and Little Beaverdam Creek. Bob's Creek which is in the valley below the mountain is a "Class A" trout stream and popular among local fisherman. Adjacent to the mountain on the Allegheny Front are Big Break Hollow and Wallacks Branch, portions of these streams are located within the State Park boundary.

== Geology ==
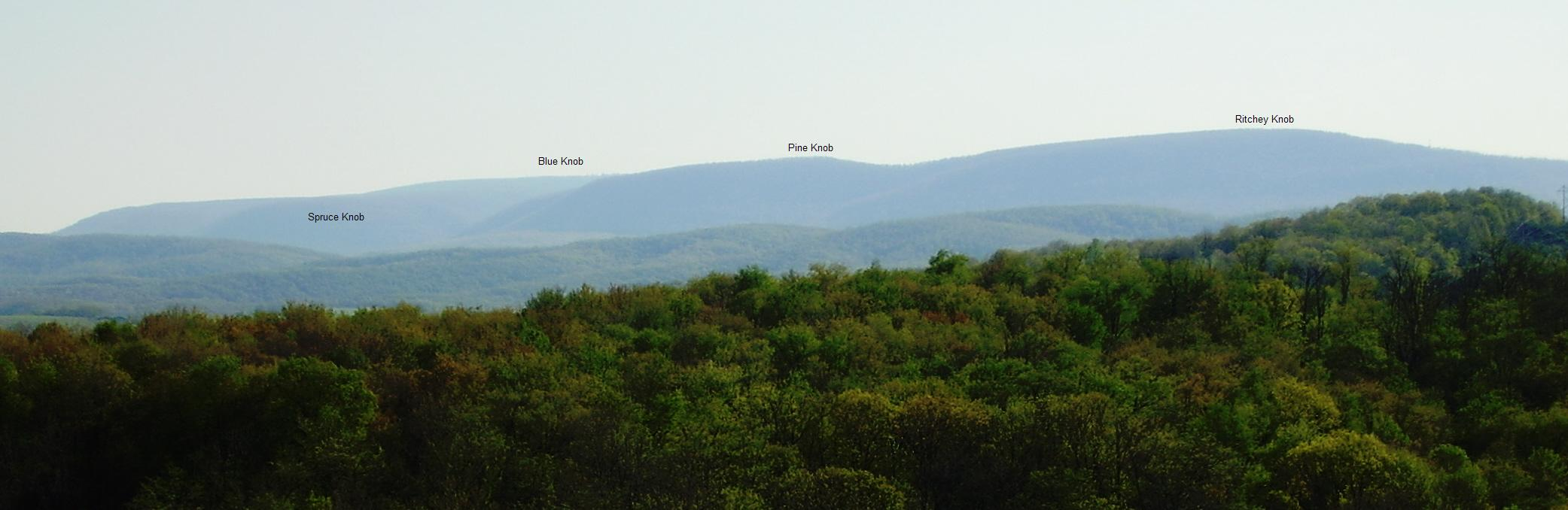
The Blue Knob massif from Chimney Rocks

Blue Knob and its subsidiary peaks form a grouping of mountains that stand out as a massif from the rest of the Allegheny Front and form some of the highest elevations in Pennsylvania's Allegheny Mountains. Blue Knob is separate from the rest of the Allegheny Front escarpment, and the mountain's lower base is made up of siltstone and shale of the Devonian Catskill and Devonian-Mississippian Rockwell formations. The upper slopes and summit are made up of the buff-colored Mississippian Burgoon Formation of sandstone and conglomerate, which is far more resistant to weathering than the underlying shale and siltstone.

== History ==
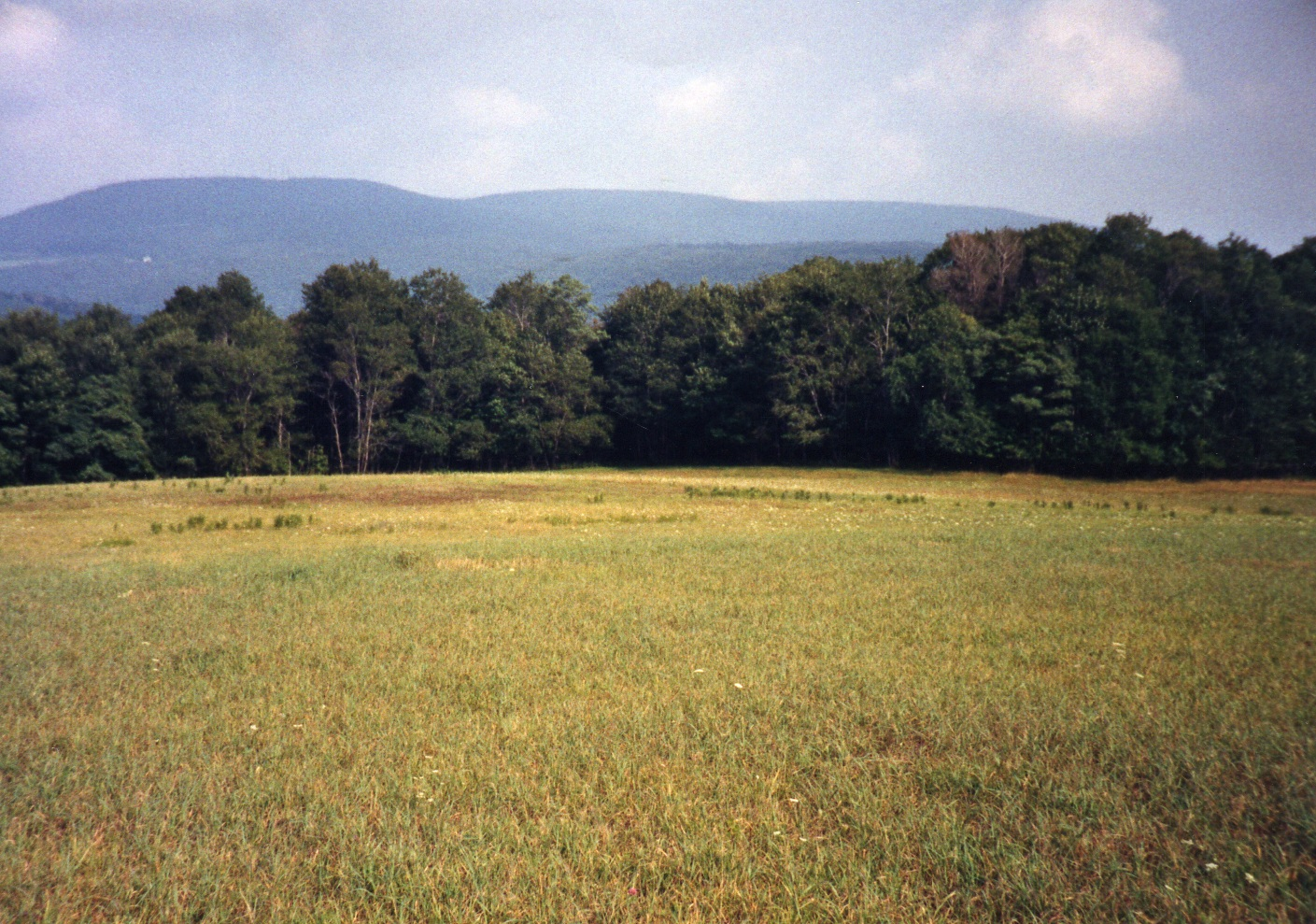
The west aspect of Blue Knob receives prevailing winds. (Photo taken from meadow at 2,400 ft.)

Blue Knob was thought to be the highest mountain in Pennsylvania until 1921, when the U.S. Geological Survey determined a summit of 3,213 feet (979 m) was higher (later named Mount Davis). In the 1950s the summit was cleared of vegetation and was the location of Claysburg Air Force Station until it was deactivated in 1961. Shortly afterward the Blue Knob Ski area was developed. Signs from the former station remain on the summit, and one building remains as a ski lodge. Ski lifts, a ski lodge and a couple of maintenance structures occupy the broad summit of Blue Knob, and a few ski chalets are downhill of the bald summit.

== Climate ==
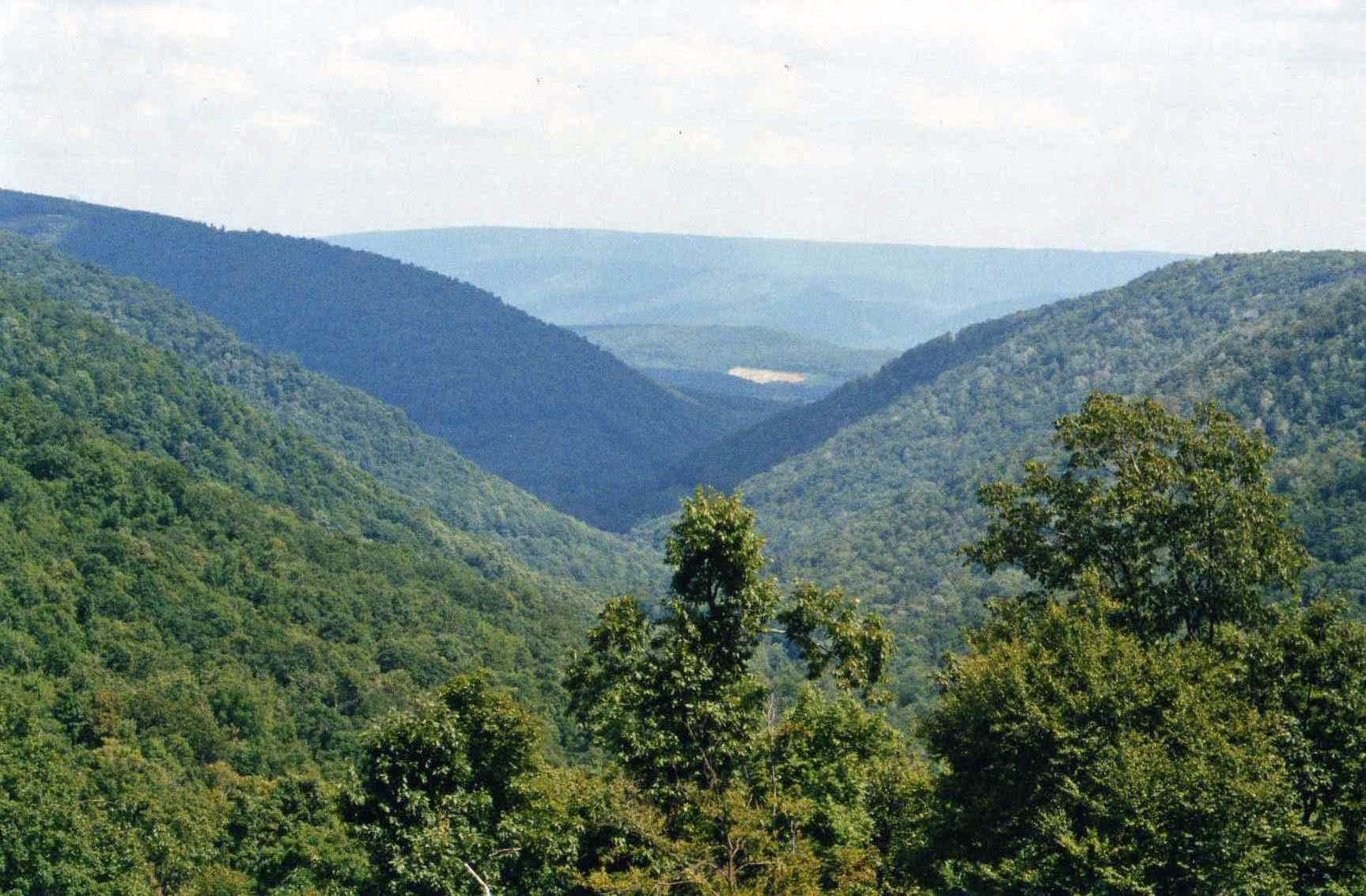
Looking down the Big Lick Branch drainage from the upper slopes of Blue Knob

The state record snowfall of 225 inches (5,700 mm) was recorded on Blue Knob during the winter of 1890–91. In December 1890 alone, 86 inches (2,200 mm) fell on the mountain. Average snowfall is about 12 feet (3.7 m) annually, while temperatures usually are 10 to 12 °F (5.6 to 6.7 °C) cooler than in the surrounding towns.

Blue Knob's weather can be attributed to its aspect and elevation. The mountain rises approximately 500 feet (150 m) above the plateaus to the west, and over 1,500 feet (460 m) above the lowlands to the east. The prevailing winds hit the mountain's slopes, accelerating up and over its bald summit. It is these conditions that can cause wind chill factors to dip below zero during the winter months.

== Vegetation ==
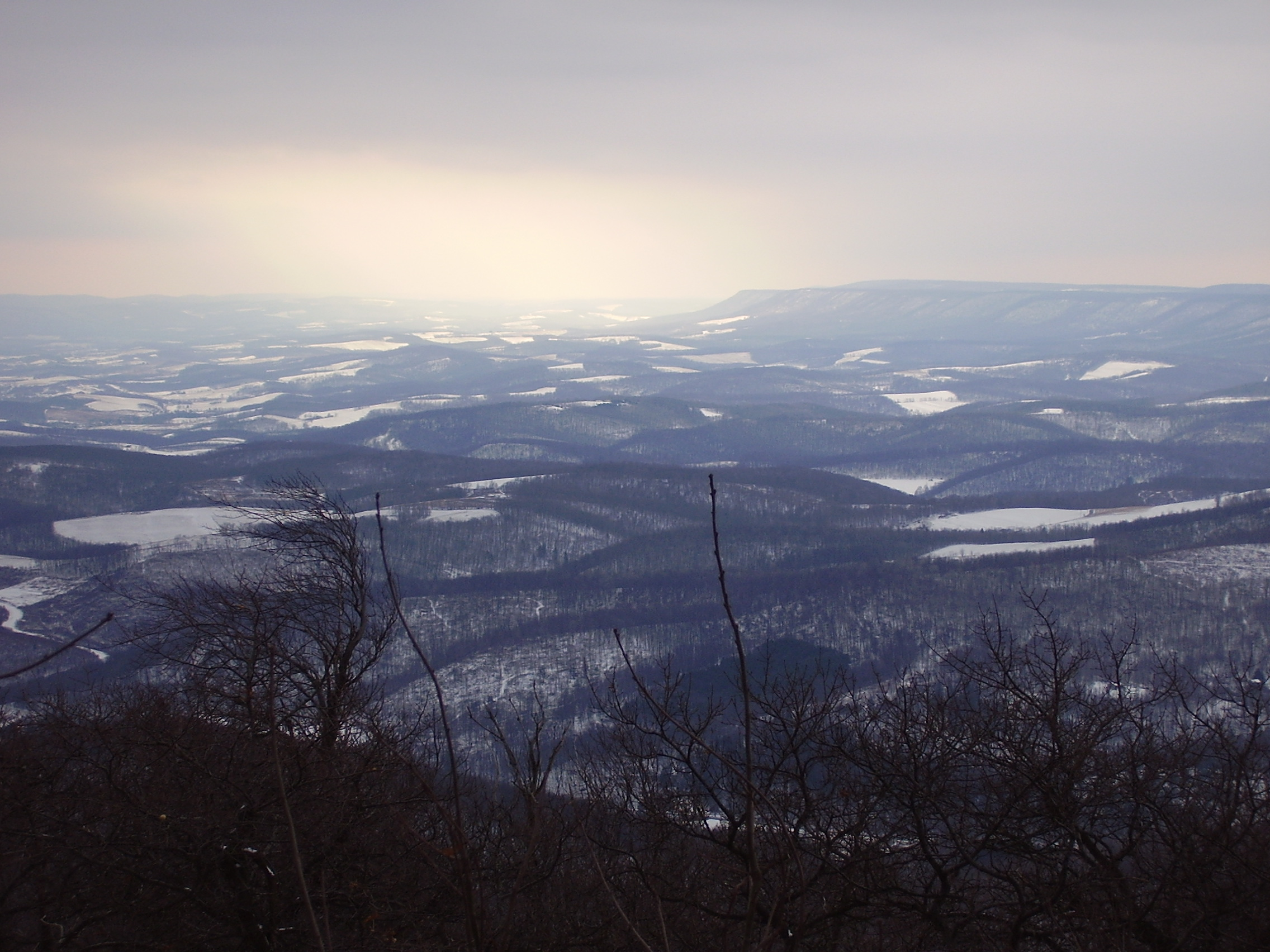
View from the Pavia overlook

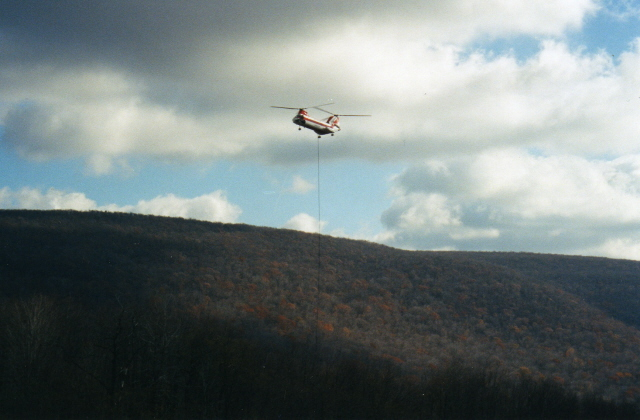
Salvage operation after 2004 wind storm

Eastern Hemlock trees are located along streams of the mountain's lower slopes, and the drier east and southeast face of the mountain is predominantly a Red and White oak and maple mix, with grapevines and some exotic invasive species where there are holes in the canopy. The north and west faces of the mountain contain Tulip poplar, American Beech and other associated hardwoods due to the richer soils. The upper slopes of the mountain have Black Cherry, Striped Maple, Scrub Oak and a forest floor of blueberry and fern. Over the 3,000-foot (910 m) contour the trees are distinctively stunted due to the winds and fierce weather.

In September 2004, during Hurricane Ivan, strong winds streamed through the saddle between Herman Point and Blue Knob. Many of the larger trees were blown down, opening holes in the forest canopy.

== Wildlife ==
Wildlife is abundant on the slopes of Blue Knob. Species such as white-tailed deer, ruffed grouse, turkey, coyote, porcupine and fox are difficult to see, but finding their tracks in the snow is not uncommon. Black bears are also resident on the mountain and are more likely to be seen during the early morning and evening hours. Red-tailed hawks, warblers, vireos and songbirds are found here throughout the seasons.

Adjacent to the state park is the 11,926-acre (48.26 km^{2}) Pennsylvania State Game Lands No. 26. This area combined with the park creates an area of over 17,000 acres (69 km^{2}) of public land. There are a few areas in Blue Knob State Park which are closed to hunting (see park map). Hikers need to be extremely careful during the hunting season in late November and through December.
