= Kimmel Township, Bedford County, Pennsylvania =

Township in Pennsylvania, US

Coordinates: 40°14′00″N 78°30′59″W

Kimmel Township, Pennsylvania
- Township
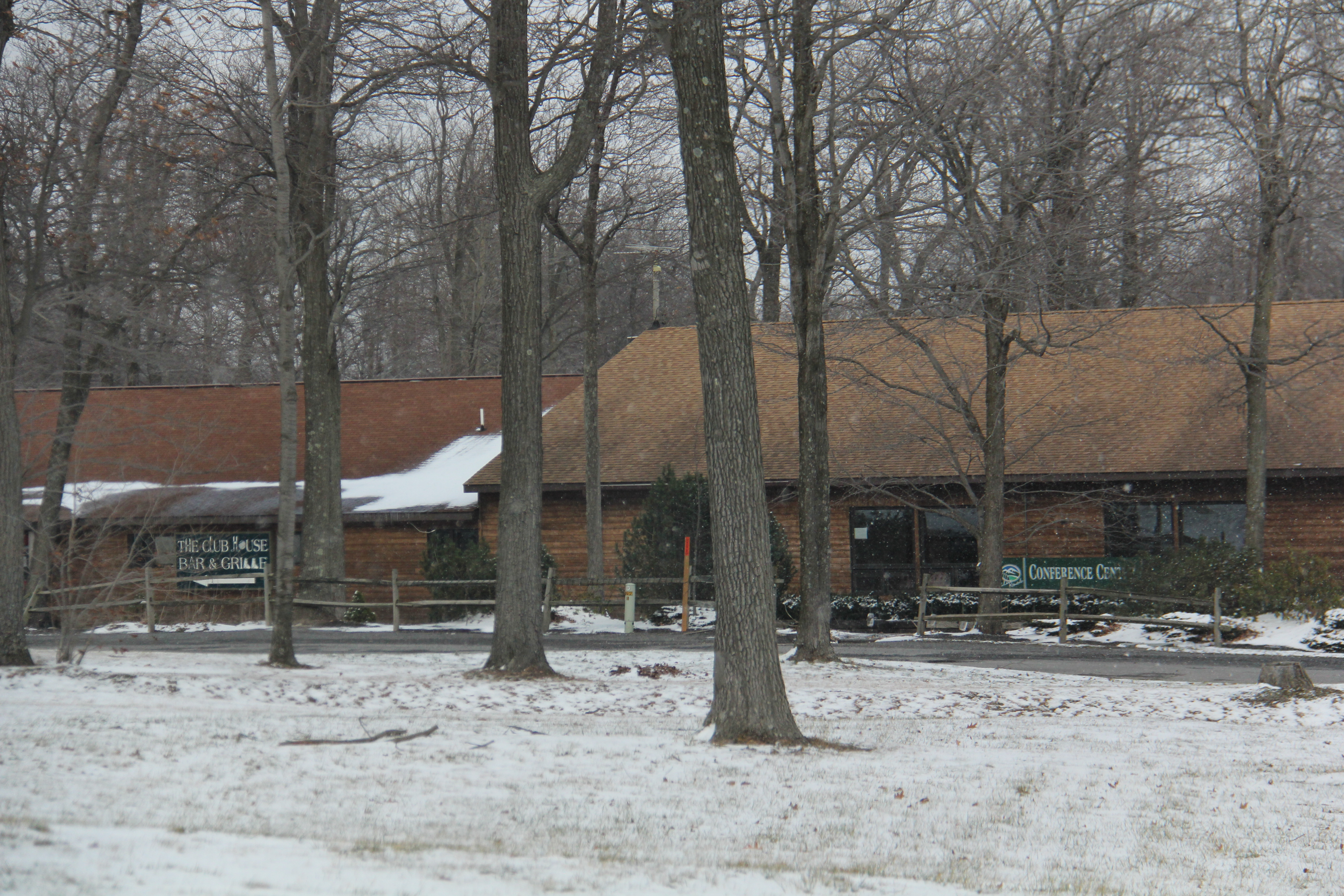
- Part of the Blue Knob All Seasons Resort within Kimmel Township

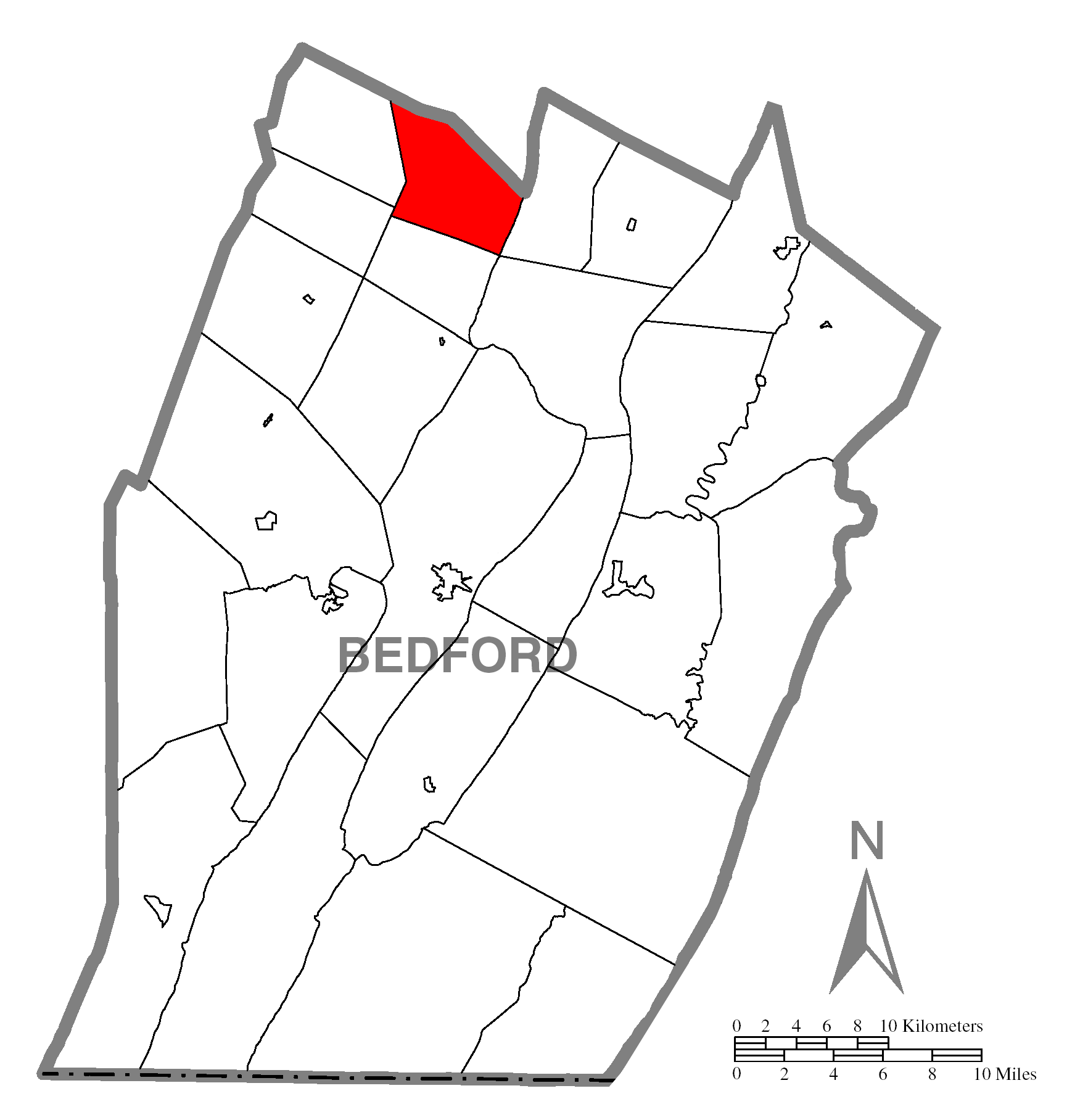
- Map of Bedford County, Pennsylvania highlighting Kimmel Township

- Map of Bedford County, Pennsylvania
- Country: United States
- State: Pennsylvania
- County: Bedford
- Settled: 1794
- Incorporated: 1899

Area
  - Total: 20.19 sq mi (52.28 km^{2})
  - Land: 20.18 sq mi (52.26 km^{2})
  - Water: 0.0077 sq mi (0.02 km^{2})

Population (2020)
  - Total: 1,527 ▼
  - Estimate (2023): 1,518
  - Density: 77.5/sq mi (29.93/km^{2})
- Time zone: UTC-5 (Eastern (EST))
  - Summer (DST): UTC-4 (EDT)
- Area code: 814
- FIPS code: 42-009-39658

Kimmel Township is a township that is located in Bedford County, Pennsylvania, United States. The population was 1,527 at the time of the 2020 census.

== Geography ==
Kimmel Township is located along the northern edge of Bedford County. According to the United States Census Bureau, the township has a total area of 20.19 square miles (52.28 km^{2}), of which 0.008 square miles (0.02 km^{2}), or 0.04%, is water.

== Demographics ==
Historical population
Census	Pop.	Note	%±
2010	1,616		—
2020	1,527		−5.5%
2023 (est.)	1,518		−0.6%
U.S. Decennial Census

As of the census of 2000, there were 1,609 people, 624 households, and 468 families residing in the township.

The population density was 78.7 inhabitants per square mile (30.4/km^{2}). There were 852 housing units at an average density of 41.7 units per square mile (16.1 units/km^{2}).

The racial makeup of the township was 99.44% White, 0.12% Native American, and 0.44% from two or more races. Hispanic or Latino of any race were 0.25% of the population.

There were 624 households, out of which 29.5% had children under the age of eighteen living with them; 64.7% were married couples living together, 6.6% had a female householder with no husband present, and 25.0% were non-families. 21.2% of all households were made up of individuals, and 9.5% had someone living alone who was sixty-five years of age or older.

The average household size was 2.58 and the average family size was 2.99.

Within the township, the population was spread out, with 21.8% who were under the age of eighteen, 9.4% who were aged eighteen to twenty-four, 30.0% who were aged twenty-five to forty-four, 26.5% who were aged forty-five to sixty-four, and 12.3% who were sixty-five years of age or older. The median age was thirty-eight years.

For every one hundred females, there were 97.9 males. For every one hundred females who were aged eighteen or older, there were 99.4 males.

The median income for a household in the township was $33,690, and the median income for a family was $38,510. Males had a median income of $30,653 compared with that of $19,318 for females.

The per capita income for the township was $16,429.

Approximately 8.9% of families and 11.6% of the population were living below the poverty line, including 15.0% of those who were under the age of eighteen and 13.4% of those who were aged sixty-five or older.
