= Big Mountain (Pennsylvania) =

High point on the Tuscarora Mountain ridge in south central Pennsylvania

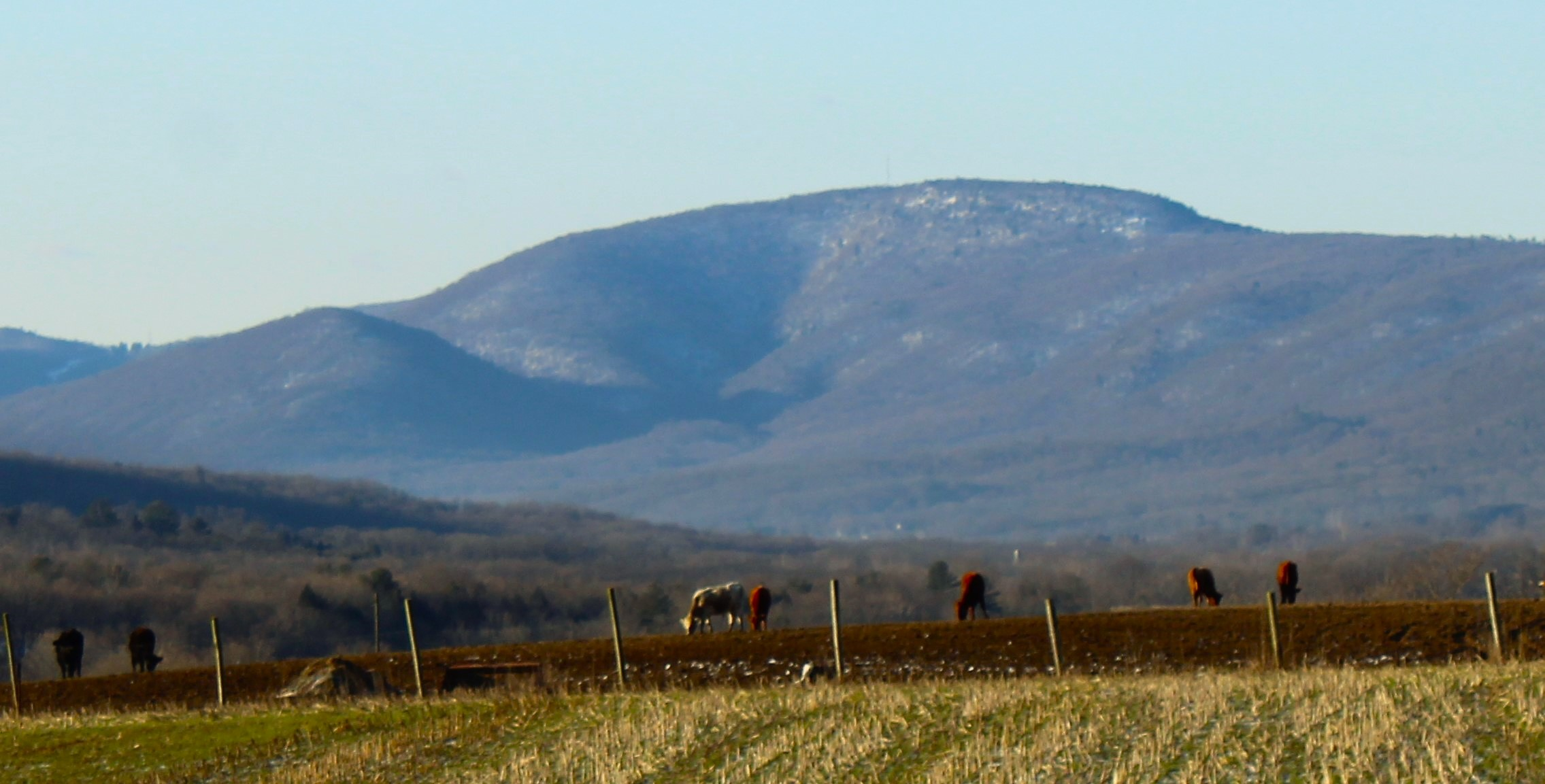
- Big Mountain

Highest point
- Elevation: 2,458 ft (749 m) NGVD 29
- Coordinates: 39°57′01″N 77°56′12″W

Geography
- Location: Franklin / Fulton counties, Pennsylvania, U.S.
- Parent range: Appalachian Mountains
- Topo map: USGS McConnellsburg (Pennsylvania)

Climbing
- Easiest route: Road

Big Mountain is the high point on the Tuscarora Mountain ridge in south central Pennsylvania in the United States. The 2,458-foot (749 m) summit is located in the Buchanan State Forest and offers fine view.

Tuscarora Formation quartzite of the Silurian Age underlies the summit; it is this weather resistant rock which gives Big Mountain its high prominence. Big Mountain has the largest vertical rise in state, with over an 1800' difference between summit and the creek valley below on the east side of the mountain.

Big Mountain and the rest of the Tuscarora Ridge has abundant wildlife. Black bear, white-tailed deer, a variety of bird species and its most notorious resident the timber rattlesnake can be found while hiking on the ridge.

The Tuscarora Trail passes along the ridge and over the summit, the nearby Cowans Gap State Park offers a variety of campsites, swimming, boating and hiking trails centered on a 42-acre (17 ha) lake.

== Gallery ==
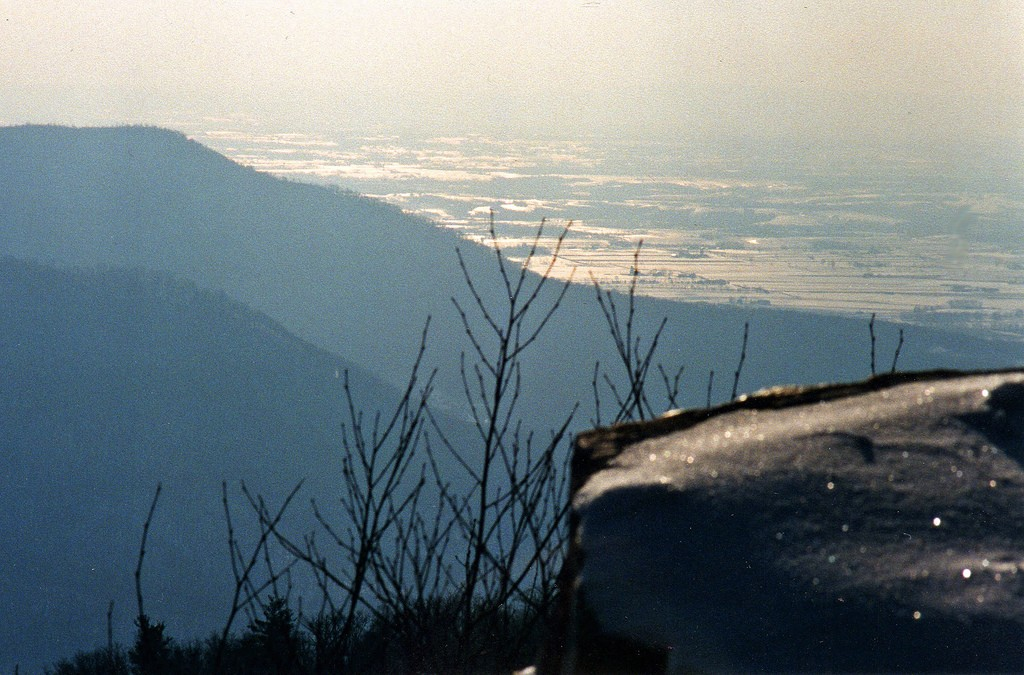
View from summit of Big Mountain, looking east toward Parnell Knob and the "Great Valley"

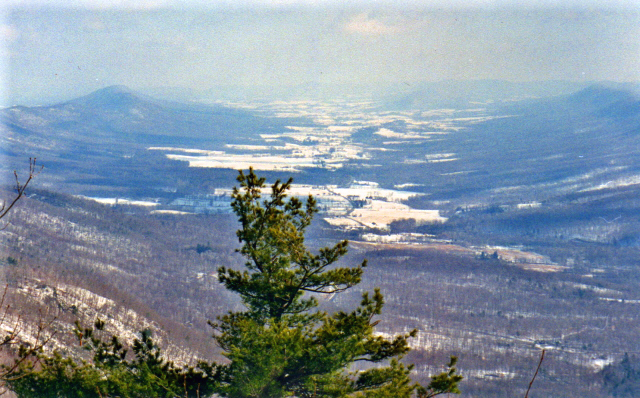
View looking north up the Path Valley

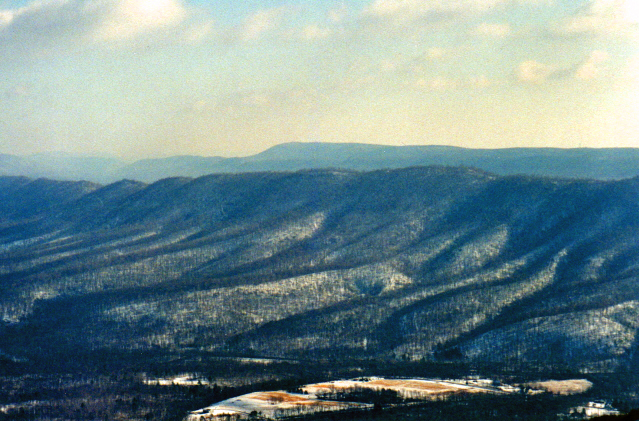
View looking toward Kittatinny Mountain and Clarks Knob

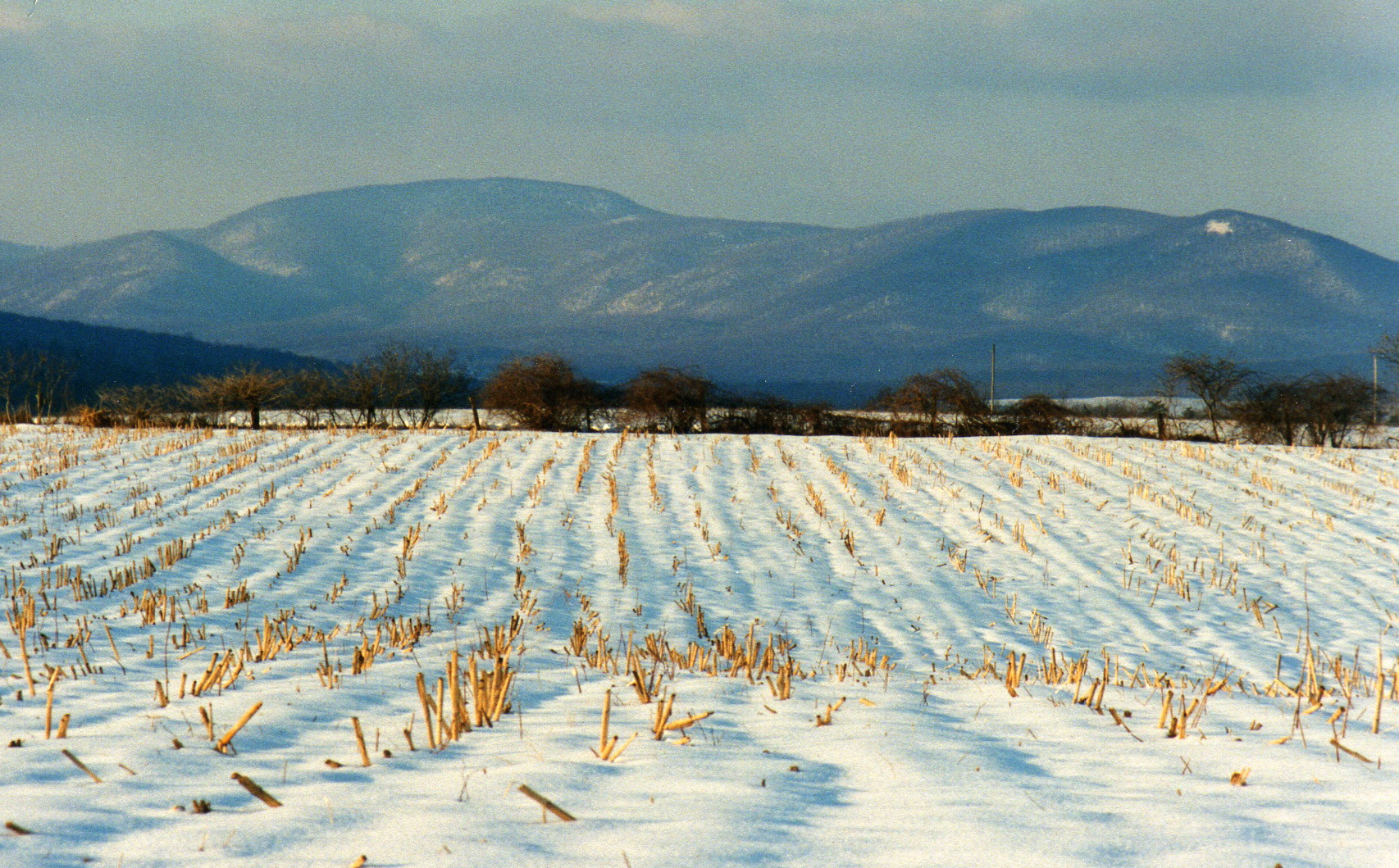
Big Mountain Summit as seen from Fannettsburg, Pennsylvania.

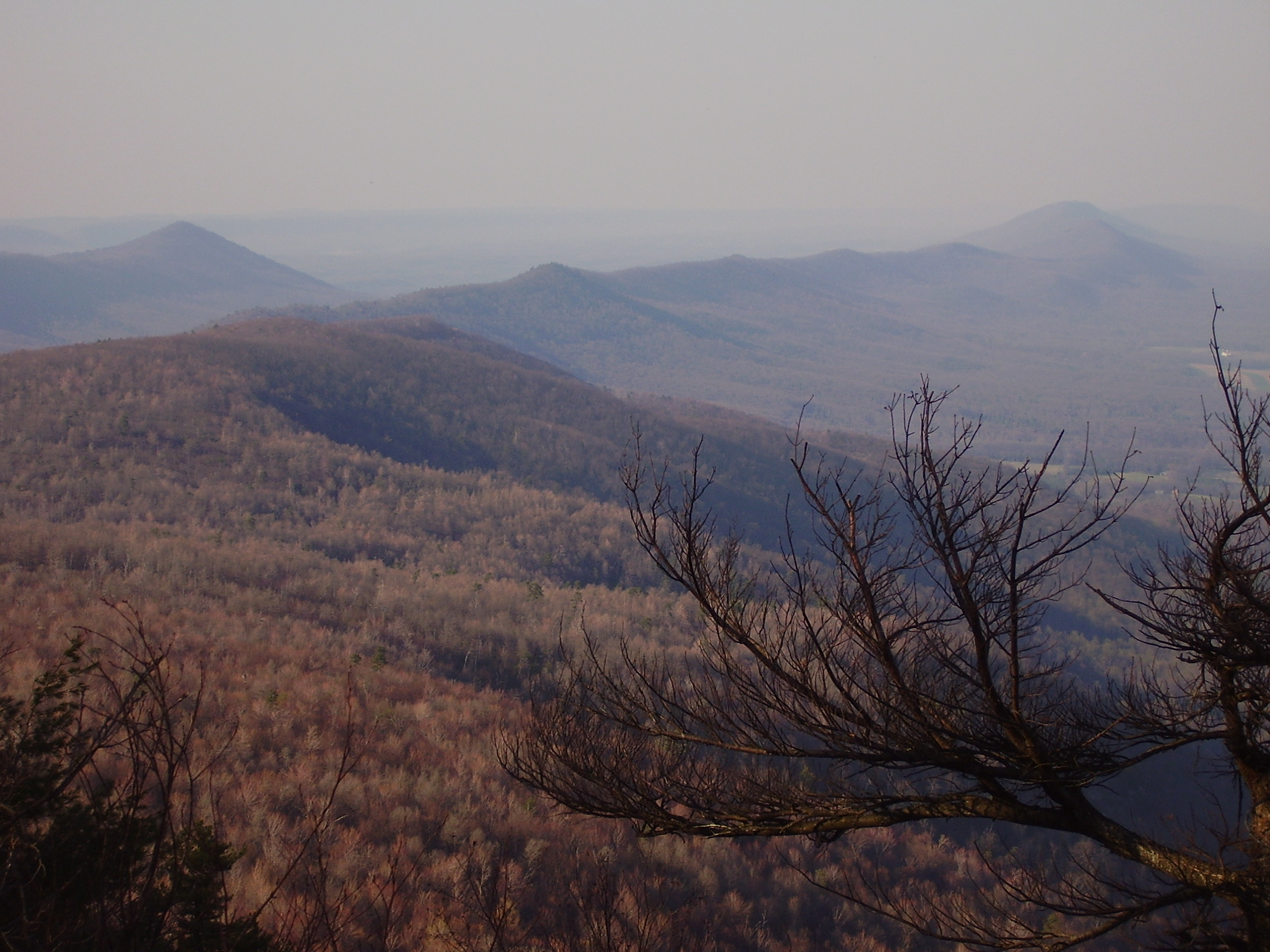
Looking north from summit. Cove Mountain is to the left and Tuscarora Mountain to the right.

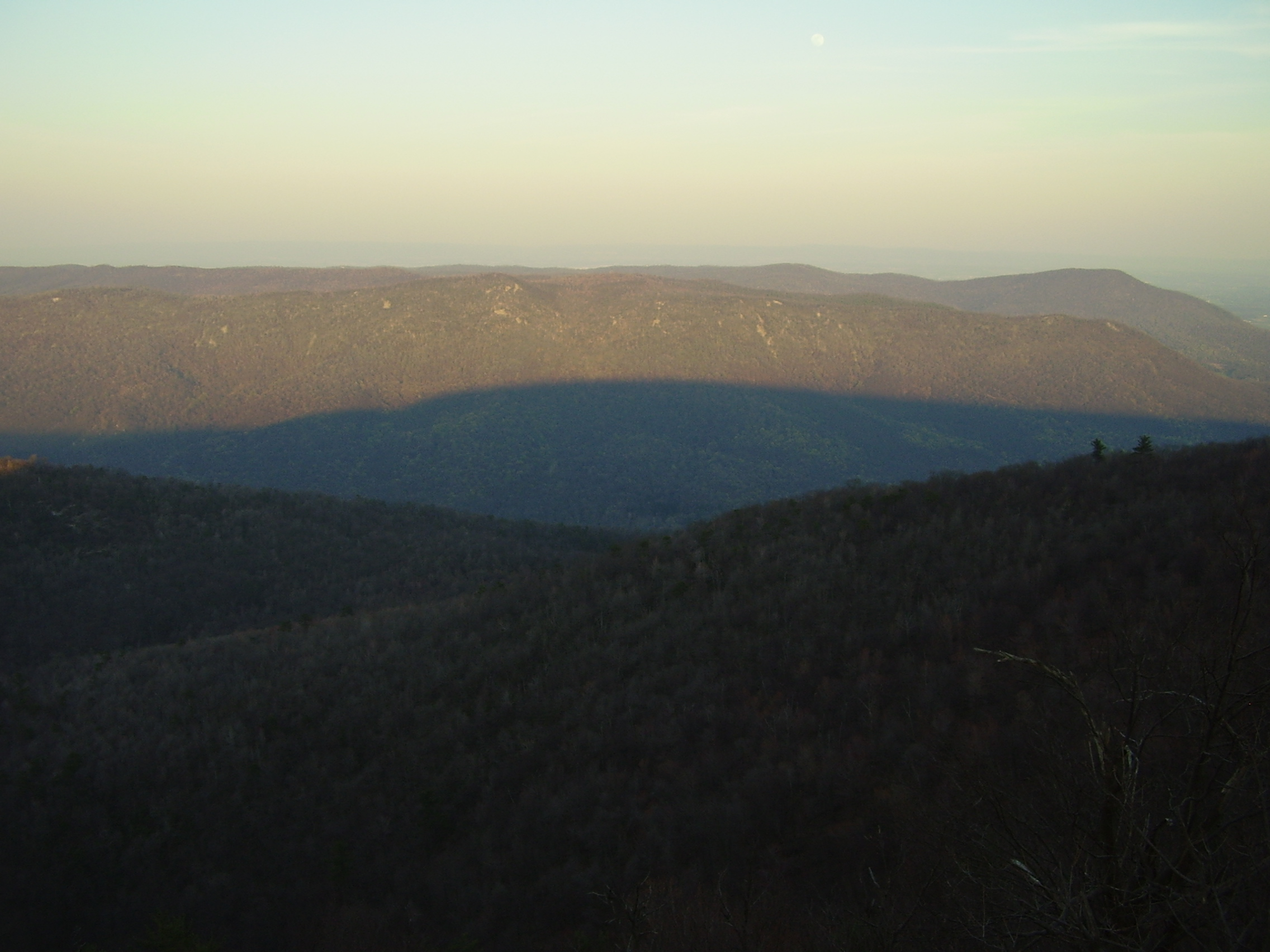
Shadow of Big Mountain cast on Kittatinny Mountain to the east.

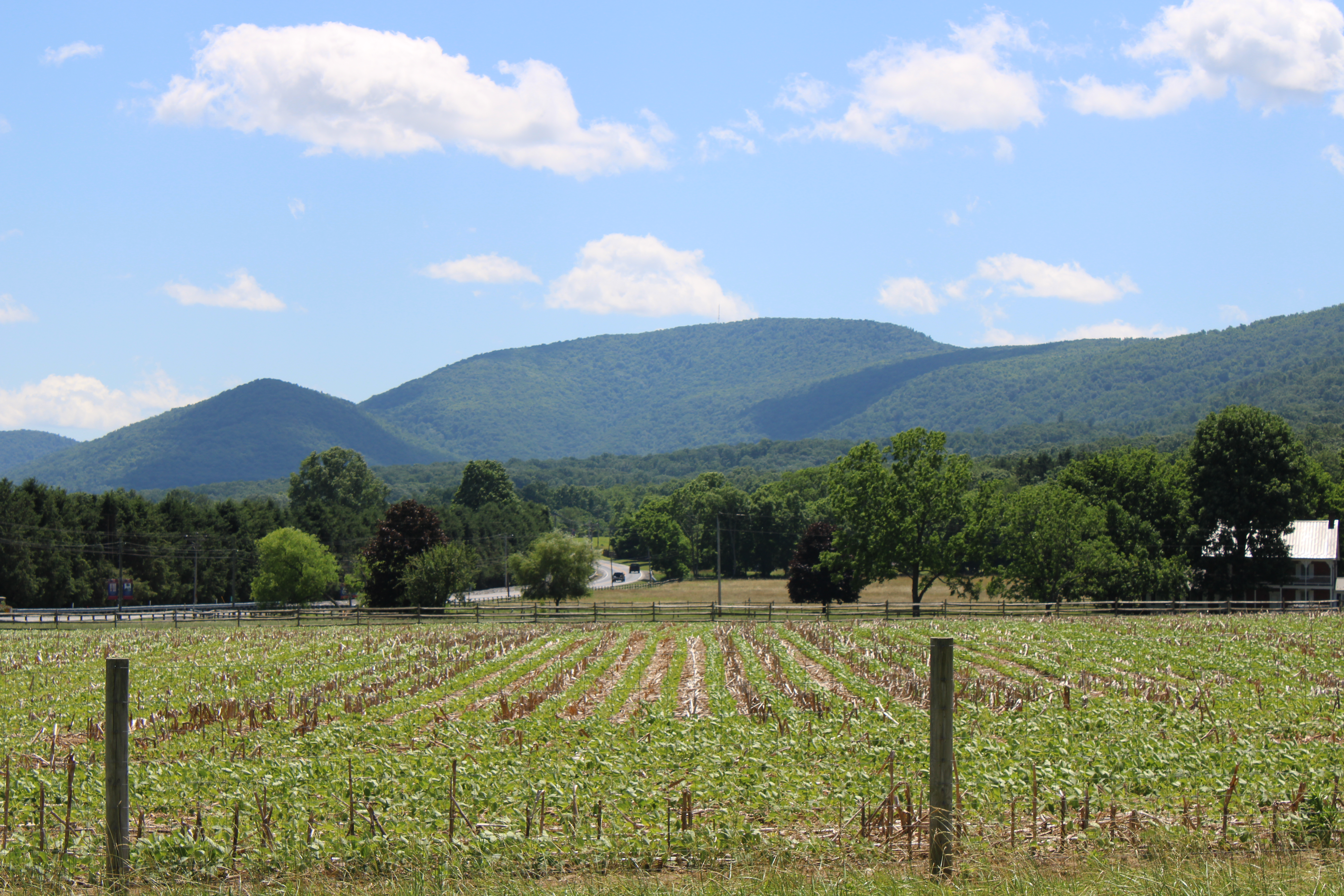
Summit of Big Mountain as seen from the Path Valley.
