= Allegheny Mountain (Pennsylvania) =

Mountain in Pennsylvania, United States

- Allegheny Ridge
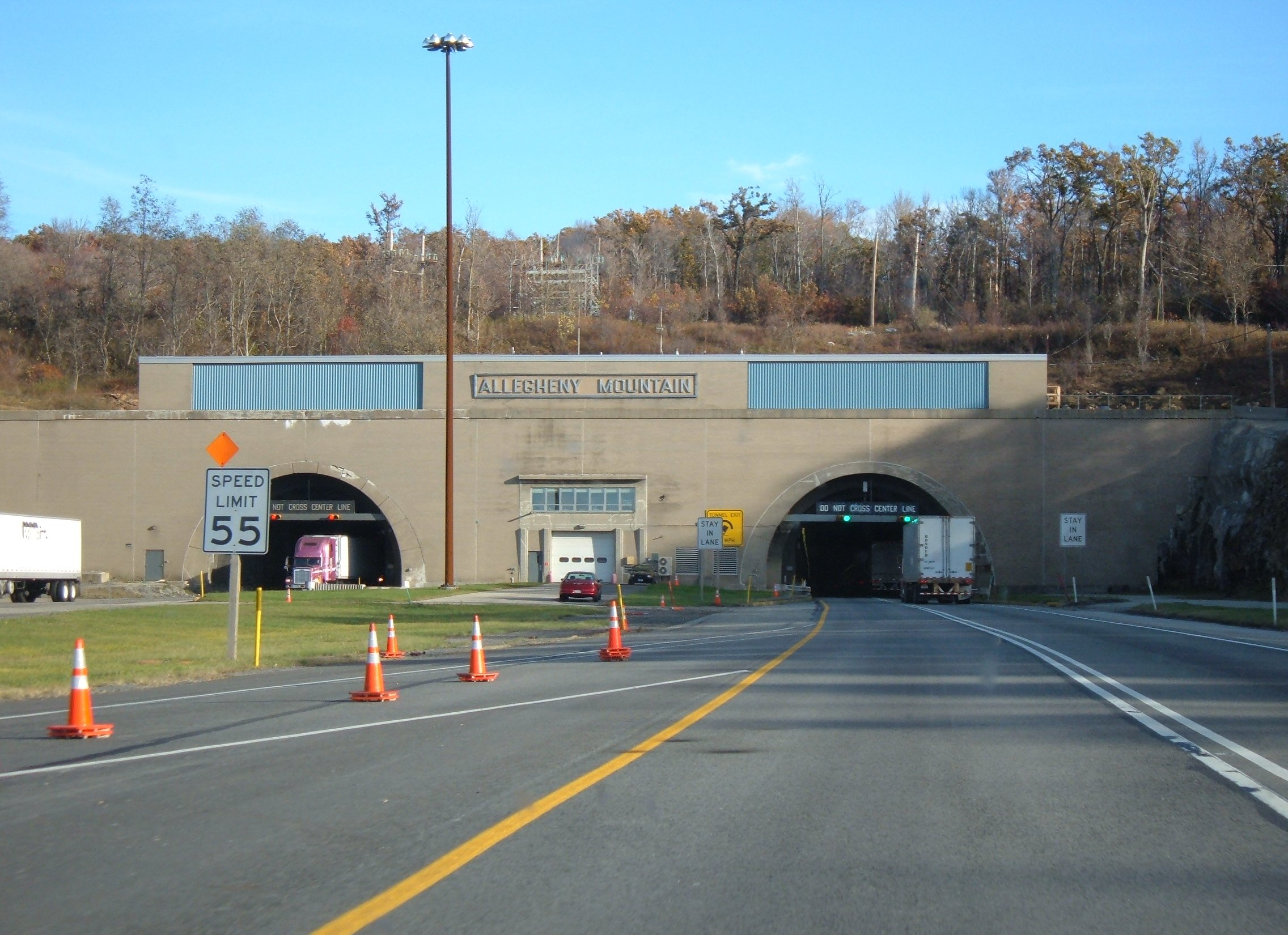
- Allegheny Mountain Tunnel on the Pennsylvania Turnpike

Highest point
- Peak: Grandview Summit, Eastern Continental Divide
- Elevation: 3,010.3 ft (917.5 m)
- Coordinates: 40°3′29″N 78°45′29″W

Geography
- Location within Pennsylvania
- Country: United States
- State: Pennsylvania
- Counties: Bedford, Cambria and Somerset
- Parent range: Ridge-and-Valley Appalachians of the Allegheny Mountains

Geology
- Orogeny: Alleghenian orogeny
- Rock type: Carboniferous
- Eastern Continental Divide points of Allegheny Mountain (Pennsylvania)

Allegheny Mountain is a stratigraphic ridge that extends northeast to southwest from south of Blue Knob to a saddle point at the Savage Mountain anticline. It merges with Negro Mountain just north of the Cambria County line where the Berlin-Salisbury basin expires.

The Eastern Continental Divide enters Allegheny Mountain south of Fraziers Pass and follows the Allegheny Backbone southwest where it leaves the escarpment toward the saddle point to the southeast between headwaters of Flaugherty and Wills Creeks, at which the ECD enters the Savage Mountain anticline.
