= Herman Point =

Mountain in Pennsylvania, United States

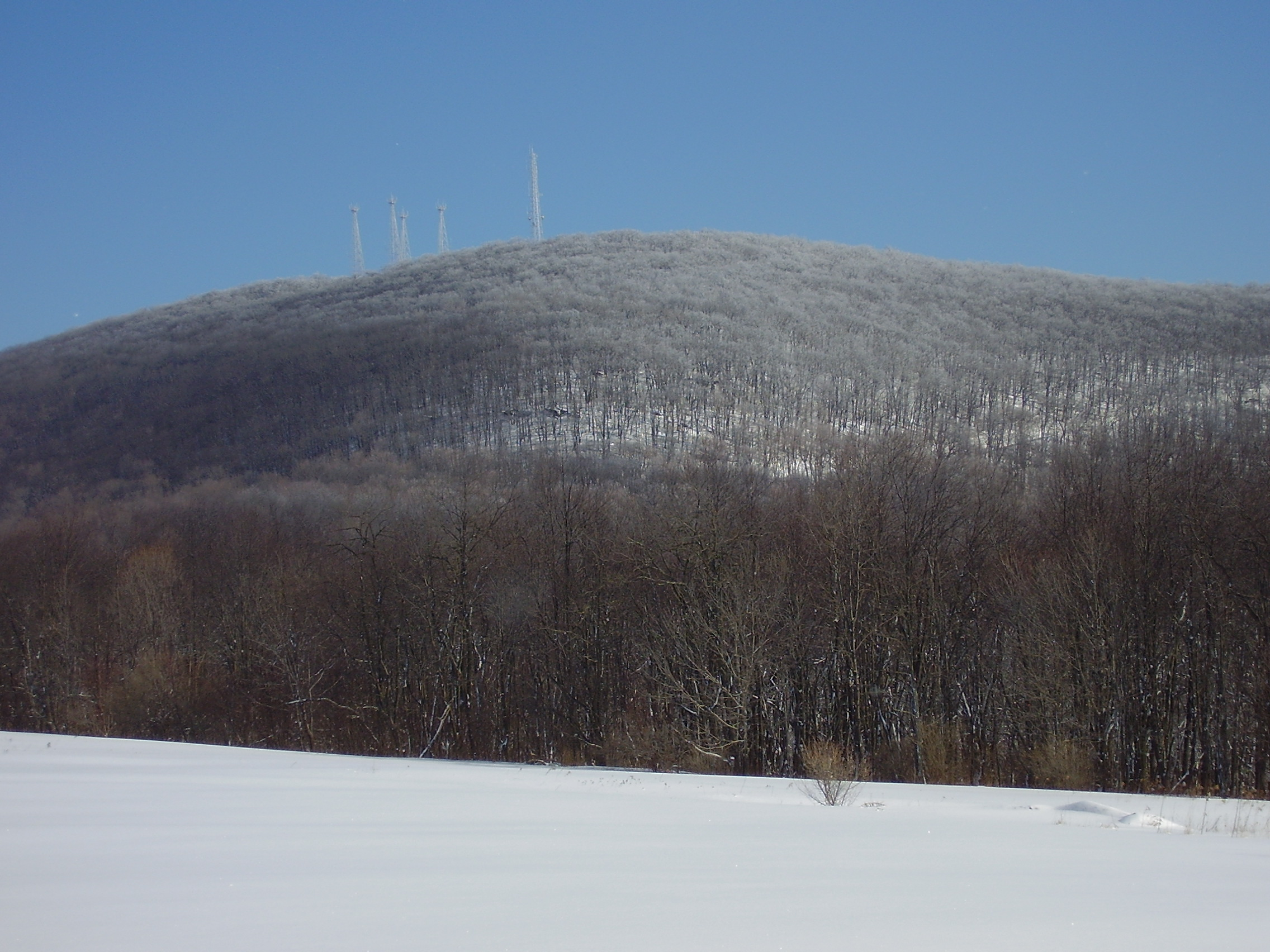
- Herman Point as seen from Chappell Field

Highest point
- Elevation: 3,034 ft (925 m)
- Coordinates: 40°17′45.08″N 78°34′25.44″W

Geography
- Location: Bedford County, Pennsylvania, U.S.
- Parent range: Allegheny Mountains
- Topo map: USGS Blue Knob (PA) Quadrangle

Climbing
- Easiest route: Hike

Herman Point is a satellite of Blue Knob mountain in Pennsylvania and one of the few summits in the state which exceed 3,000 feet (914 m) feet. This summit is located in the Blue Knob State Park and serves as the trailhead for the "Lost Turkey Trail". Herman Point is also the site of FAA towers and the old fire lookout which has since been removed.
