= Schaefer Head =

Mountain in Pennsylvania, United States

Coordinates: 40.32263°N 78.55983°W

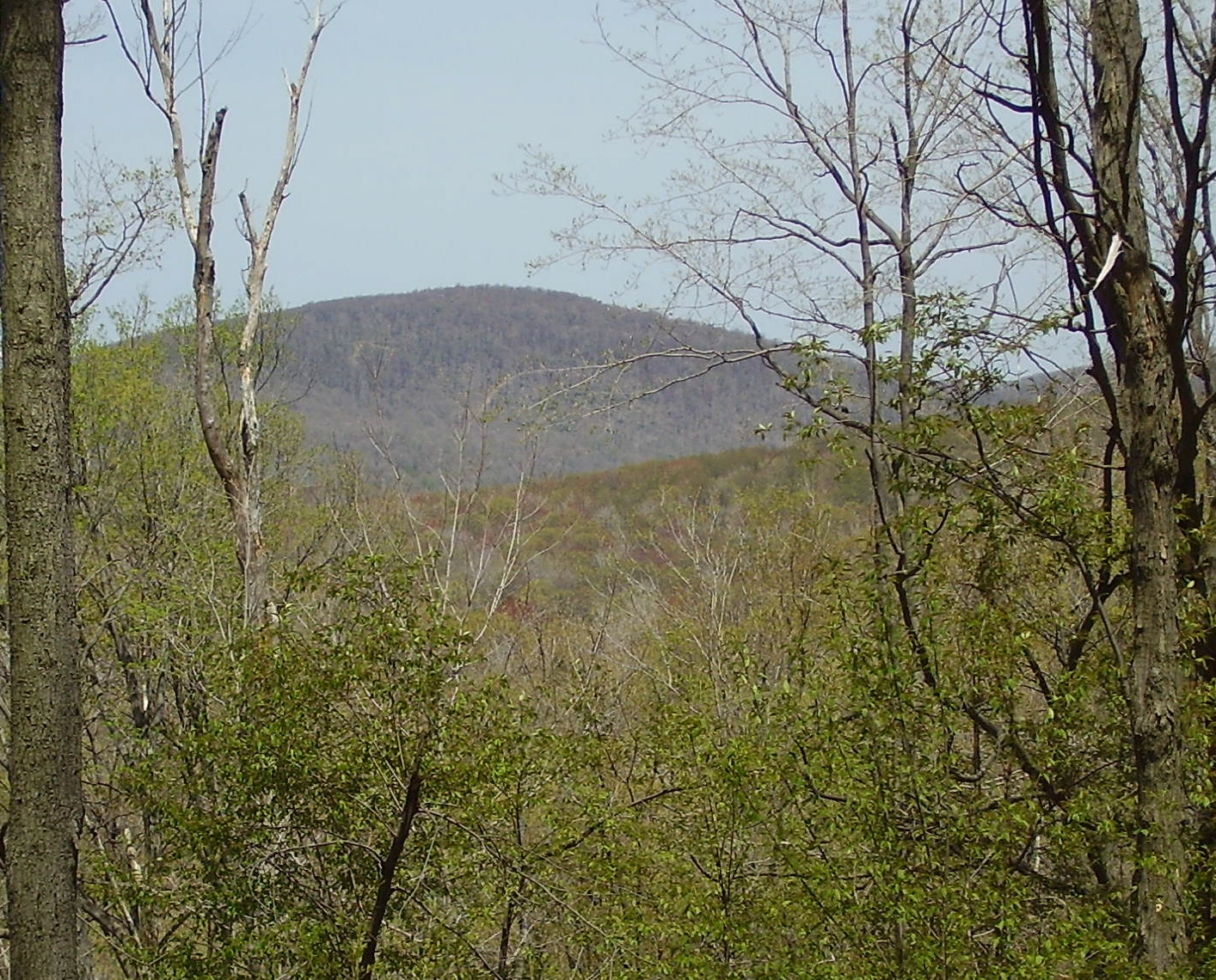
- Schaefer Head as seen from Blue Knob

Highest point
- Elevation: 2,950 ft (900 m)
- Prominence: 602 ft (183 m)

Geography
- Location: Blair County, Pennsylvania, U.S.
- Parent range: Allegheny Mountains
- Topo map: USGS Blue Knob (PA) Quadrangle

Schaefer Head is a 2,950 feet (899 m) mountain in the Allegheny Mountains of Pennsylvania. It is one of the peaks that make up the Blue Knob massif, an isolated group of mountains that stand apart from the Allegheny Front. Schaefer Head is the third highest of these peaks behind Blue Knob 3,146 feet (959 m), and Herman Point 3,034 feet (925 m). Schaefer Head is also the highest point in Blair County.

Shaefer Head is conspicuous because of its cone shaped profile. There are no roads to the summit and the only way to the top is to bushwhack.
