= Claysburg-Kimmel School District =

School district in Pennsylvania, US

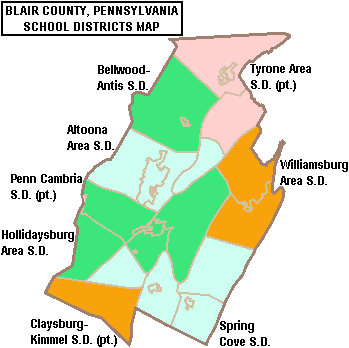

Address
- 531 Bedford Street Claysburg, Blair County and Bedford County, Pennsylvania, 16625; United States

District information
- Type: Public

Students and staff
- District mascot: Bulldogs
- Colors: Blue and Gold

Other information
- Website: http://www.cksdbulldogs.com/

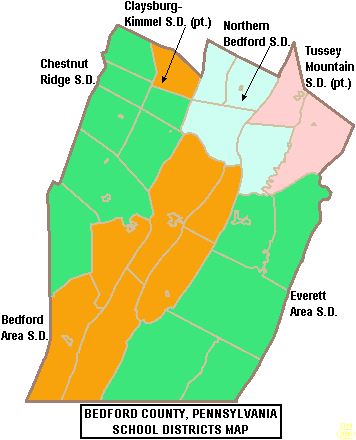
Claysburg-Kimmel School District region in Bedford County

The Claysburg-Kimmel School District is a small rural public school district that spans portions of two counties in central Pennsylvania. In Bedford County it covers Kimmel Township. In Blair County it covers Greenfield Township. Claysburg-Kimmel School District encompasses approximately 56 square miles (150 km^{2}). According to 2009 local census data, it serves a resident population of 5,513. In 2009, the district residents’ per capita income was $14,828, while the median family income was $34,038. In the Commonwealth, the median family income was $49,501 and the United States median family income was $49,445, in 2010.

== Schools ==
- Claysburg-Kimmel Elementary School (Grades K-6)
  240 CK Elementary Drive, Claysburg, Pennsylvania 16625
- Claysburg-Kimmel Jr./Sr. High School (Grades 7-12)
  531 Bedford Street, Claysburg, Pennsylvania 16625

== Extracurriculars ==
The district offers a variety of clubs, activities and sports.

=== Athletics ===
The District funds:

Boys

- Baseball - A
- Basketball - A
- Football - A
- Wrestling - AA

Girls

- Basketball - A
- Softball - A
- Volleyball - A

Junior high school sports

Boys

- Baseball
- Basketball
- Football
- Wrestling

Girls

- Basketball
- Softball
- Volleyball

- According to PIAA directory July 2012
