= Claysburg, Pennsylvania =

Unincorporated community in Pennsylvania, US

- Census-designated place
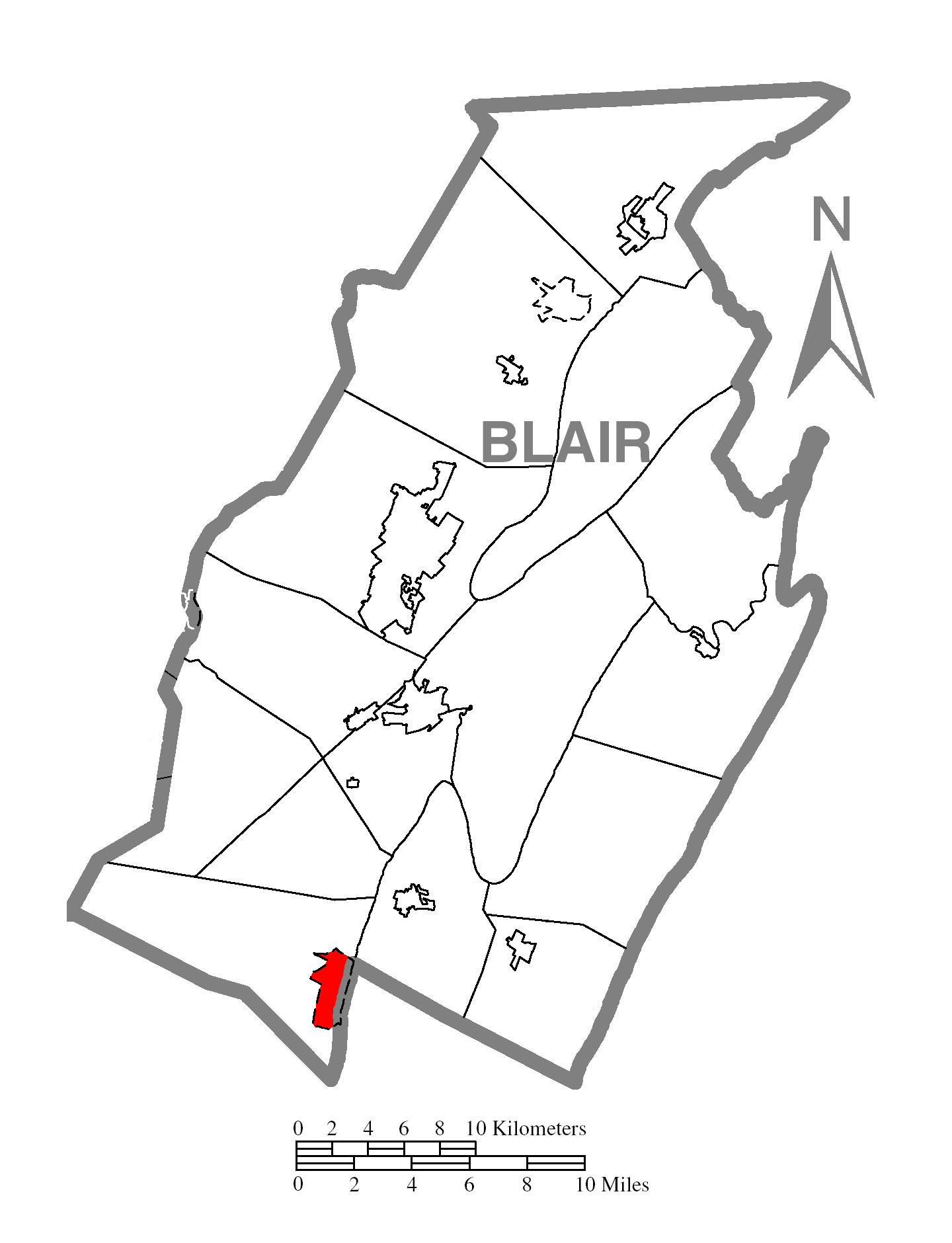
- Claysburg (depicted in red) in Blair County
- Coordinates: 40°17′29″N 78°27′05″W
- Country: United States
- State: Pennsylvania
- County: Blair
- Township: Greenfield

Area
  - Total: 1.34 sq mi (3.46 km^{2})
  - Land: 1.34 sq mi (3.46 km^{2})
  - Water: 0 sq mi (0.00 km^{2})
- Elevation: 1,175 ft (358 m)

Population (2020)
  - Total: 1,291
  - Density: 965.7/sq mi (372.86/km^{2})
- Time zone: UTC-5 (Eastern (EST))
  - Summer (DST): UTC-4 (EDT)
- ZIP code: 16625
- Area code: 814
- Local phone exchange: 239
- GNIS feature ID: 2389329
- Website: www.claysburgpa.com

Claysburg is a census-designated place (CDP) along Interstate 99 and the Allegheny Front in Blair County, Pennsylvania, United States, situated near the base of Blue Knob. As of the 2020 census, it had a population of 1,291.

== Notable people ==
- Danny Napoleon (1942–2003) – Outfielder for the New York Mets from 1965- 1966.

== Demographics ==
Historical population
Census	Pop.	Note	%±
2000	1,503		—
2010	1,625		8.1%
2020	1,291		−20.6%
U.S. Decennial Census

As of the census of 2000, there were 1,503 people, 616 households, and 442 families residing in the CDP. There were 653 housing units at an average density of 254.9 per square mile (98.4/km^{2}). The racial makeup of the CDP was 98.54% White, 0.13% African American, 0.33% from other races, and 1.00% from two or more races. Hispanic or Latino of any race were 0.73% of the population.

There were 616 households, out of which 35.1% had children under the age of 18 living with them, 46.9% were married couples living together, 20.1% had a female householder with no husband present, and 28.2% were non-families. 25.6% of all households were made up of individuals, and 13.5% had someone living alone who was 65 years of age or older. The average household size was 2.41 and the average family size was 2.83.

In the CDP, the population was spread out, with 26.3% under the age of 18, 8.8% from 18 to 24, 27.2% from 25 to 44, 20.3% from 45 to 64, and 17.3% who were 65 years of age or older. The median age was 36 years. For every 100 females, there were 83.1 males. For every 100 females age 18 and over, there were 78.8 males.

The median income for a household in the CDP was $27,625, and the median income for a family was $29,792. Males had a median income of $28,911 versus $17,931 for females. The per capita income for the CDP was $13,277. About 17.0% of families and 16.4% of the population were below the poverty line, including 23.2% of those under age 18 and 9.3% of those age 65 or over.

== History ==
The town is the 1961 location of Claysburg Air Force Station (originally Blue Knob Park).

== Education ==
It is in the Claysburg-Kimmel School District.
