= Pennsylvania House of Representatives, District 80 =

American legislative district

Pennsylvania's 80th State House of Representatives district
Representative
Scott Barger; R–Hollidaysburg
- Population (2022): 62,295

The 80th Pennsylvania House of Representatives District is located in central Pennsylvania and has been represented by Scott Barger since 2025.

== District profile ==
The 80th District is located in Blair County and Huntingdon County and includes the following areas:

Blair County

- Antis Township
- Bellwood
- Blair Township
- Catharine Township
- Duncansville
- Frankstown Township
- Freedom Township
- Greenfield Township
- Hollidaysburg
- Huston Township
- Juniata Township
- Martinsburg
- Newry
- North Woodbury Township
- Roaring Spring
- Snyder Township
- Taylor Township
- Tyrone
- Tyrone Township
- Williamsburg
- Woodbury Township

Huntingdon County

- Birmingham
- Franklin Township
- Warriors Mark Township

== Representatives ==
Representative	Party	Years	District home	Note
Prior to 1969, seats were apportioned by county.
W. William Wilt	Republican	1969 – 1976		
Michael E. Cassidy	Democrat	1977 – 1978		
Edwin G. Johnson	Republican	1979 – 1992		
Jerry Stern	Republican	1993 – 2014	Martinsburg	
Judy Ward	Republican	2015 – 2018	Frankstown Township	
James Gregory	Republican	2019 – 2024		
Scott Barger	Republican	2025 – present	Hollidaysburg	Incumbent

== Recent election results ==
PA House election, 2024: Pennsylvania House, District 80
Party	Candidate	Votes	%
Republican	Scott Barger	Unopposed	
Total votes		30,518	100.00
Republican hold			

PA House election, 2022: Pennsylvania House, District 80
Party	Candidate	Votes	%
Republican	Jim Gregory (incumbent)	22,764	80.92
Democratic	Kimberly Capenos	5,367	19.08
Total votes		28,131	100.00
Republican hold			

PA House election, 2020: Pennsylvania House, District 80
Party	Candidate	Votes	%
Republican	Jim Gregory (incumbent)	Unopposed	
Total votes		30,950	100.00
Republican hold			

PA House election, 2018: Pennsylvania House, District 80
Party	Candidate	Votes	%
Republican	Jim Gregory	17,889	74.37
Democratic	Laura Burke	6,164	25.63
Total votes		24,053	100.00
Republican hold			

PA House election, 2016: Pennsylvania House, District 80
Party	Candidate	Votes	%
Republican	Judy Ward (incumbent)	Unopposed	
Total votes		26,397	100.00
Republican hold			
