= Smith Corner, Pennsylvania =

Unincorporated community in Pennsylvania, US

- Census-designated place
- Location within Pennsylvania Location within the United States
- Coordinates: 40°21′27″N 78°29′10″W
- Country: United States
- State: Pennsylvania
- County: Blair
- Township: Freedom

Area
  - Total: 0.027 sq mi (0.07 km^{2})
  - Land: 0.027 sq mi (0.07 km^{2})
  - Water: 0 sq mi (0.0 km^{2})
- Elevation: 1,342 ft (409 m)
- Time zone: UTC-5 (Eastern (EST))
  - Summer (DST): UTC-4 (EDT)
- ZIP Code: 16637 (East Freedom)
- Area codes: 814/582
- FIPS code: 42-71298
- GNIS feature ID: 2805562

Smith Corner is an unincorporated community and census-designated place (CDP) in Blair County, Pennsylvania, United States. It was first listed as a CDP prior to the 2020 census.

The CDP is in southwestern Blair County, in the western part of Freedom Township. It sits at the base of the Allegheny Front in the valley of South Dry Run, an eastward-flowing tributary of the Frankstown Branch Juniata River. Pennsylvania Route 164 passes through the community, leading east 3 miles (5 km) to East Freedom and west 11 miles (18 km) over the Allegheny Front to Portage.
