= Reservoir, Pennsylvania =

Unincorporated community in Pennsylvania, US

- Census-designated place
- Location within Pennsylvania Location within the United States
- Coordinates: 40°24′16″N 78°22′50″W
- Country: United States
- State: Pennsylvania
- County: Blair
- Township: Blair

Area
  - Total: 0.46 sq mi (1.18 km^{2})
  - Land: 0.46 sq mi (1.18 km^{2})
  - Water: 0 sq mi (0.00 km^{2})
- Elevation: 1,066 ft (325 m)

Population (2020)
  - Total: 197
  - Density: 432.8/sq mi (167.12/km^{2})
- Time zone: UTC-5 (Eastern (EST))
  - Summer (DST): UTC-4 (EDT)
- ZIP Code: 16648 (Hollidaysburg)
- Area codes: 814/582
- FIPS code: 42-64256
- GNIS feature ID: 2805551

Reservoir is an unincorporated community and census-designated place (CDP) in Blair County, Pennsylvania, United States. It was first listed as a CDP prior to the 2020 census.

The CDP is in south-central Blair County, in the eastern part of Blair Township. It is on the south side of the valley of the Frankstown Branch Juniata River. Reservoir Road is the main street through the community, leading northeast 1.5 miles (2.4 km) to Loop and southwest 4 miles (6 km) to McKee. Hollidaysburg, the Blair county seat, is 4 miles (6 km) to the north by road. Loop Mountain rises to the southeast to an elevation of 2,495 feet (760 m).

== Demographics ==
Historical population
| Census | Pop. | Note | %± |
|---|---|---|---|
| 2020 | 197 | | — |
U.S. Decennial Census

== Education ==
The school district is Hollidaysburg Area School District.
