= Leamersville, Pennsylvania =

Unincorporated community in Pennsylvania, US

- Census-designated place
- Location within Pennsylvania Location within the United States
- Coordinates: 40°22′36″N 78°25′57″W
- Country: United States
- State: Pennsylvania
- County: Blair
- Township: Freedom

Area
  - Total: 0.14 sq mi (0.37 km^{2})
  - Land: 0.14 sq mi (0.37 km^{2})
  - Water: 0 sq mi (0.00 km^{2})
- Elevation: 1,031 ft (314 m)

Population (2020)
  - Total: 96
  - Density: 678.2/sq mi (261.86/km^{2})
- Time zone: UTC-5 (Eastern (EST))
  - Summer (DST): UTC-4 (EDT)
- ZIP Code: 16635 (Duncansville)
- Area codes: 814/582
- FIPS code: 42-42136
- GNIS feature ID: 2805518

Leamersville is an unincorporated community and census-designated place (CDP) in Blair County, Pennsylvania, United States.

The CDP is in southern Blair County, in the northeastern part of Freedom Township. It is bordered to the northeast by Blair Township, to the east by the Frankstown Branch of the Juniata River, to the south by Pennsylvania Route 164, to the west by Dunnings Highway (old U.S. Route 220), to the south again by Brethren Lane, and to the northwest by Interstate 99/US 220. It is 1 mile (1.6 km) north of East Freedom, the same distance south of Newry, and 10 miles (16 km) south of Altoona.

== Demographics ==
Historical population
Census	Pop.	Note	%±
2020	96		—
U.S. Decennial Census

Leamersville was first listed as a census designated place in the 2020 U.S. census.

== Education ==
It is in the Spring Cove School District.
