= Vicksburg, Blair County, Pennsylvania =

Unincorporated community in Pennsylvania, US

Vicksburg, Pennsylvania
- Census-designated place
- Location within Pennsylvania Location within the United States
- Coordinates: 40°22′11″N 78°24′57″W
- Country: United States
- State: Pennsylvania
- County: Blair
- Township: Blair

Area
  - Total: 0.066 sq mi (0.17 km^{2})
  - Land: 0.066 sq mi (0.17 km^{2})
  - Water: 0 sq mi (0.0 km^{2})
- Elevation: 1,024 ft (312 m)
- Time zone: UTC-5 (Eastern (EST))
  - Summer (DST): UTC-4 (EDT)
- ZIP Code: 16648 (Hollidaysburg)
- Area codes: 814/582
- FIPS code: 42-80136
- GNIS feature ID: 2812900

Vicksburg is an unincorporated community and census-designated place (CDP) in Blair County, Pennsylvania, United States. It was first listed as a CDP prior to the 2020 census.

The CDP is in southern Blair County, in the southern corner of Blair Township. It is bordered to the northwest by the Morrisons Cove Branch of the former Pennsylvania Railroad and to the southeast by Reservoir Road, which leads south 0.6 miles (1.0 km) to McKee and northeast 6 miles (10 km) to Loop.

Vicksburg sits at the western base of Short Mountain, a ridge which continues south of McKee as Dunning Mountain.

== Education ==
The school district is Hollidaysburg Area School District.
