= Foot of Ten, Pennsylvania =

Unincorporated community in Pennsylvania, US

- Census-designated place
- Location in Pennsylvania Foot of Ten (the United States)
- Coordinates: 40°25′05″N 78°27′42″W
- Country: United States
- State: Pennsylvania
- County: Blair
- Townships: Allegheny, Juniata

Area
  - Total: 0.58 sq mi (1.50 km^{2})
  - Land: 0.58 sq mi (1.50 km^{2})
  - Water: 0 sq mi (0.00 km^{2})
- Elevation: 1,148 ft (350 m)

Population (2020)
  - Total: 560
  - Density: 968/sq mi (373.9/km^{2})
- Time zone: UTC-5 (Eastern (EST))
  - Summer (DST): UTC-4 (EDT)
- ZIP code: 16635
- Area code: 814
- FIPS code: 42-26488
- GNIS feature ID: 2630007

Foot of Ten is a census-designated place in Allegheny and Juniata Townships in Blair County, Pennsylvania, United States. It is located approximately one mile west of the small borough Duncansville on Foot of Ten Road, and about 2.5 miles (4 km) north of the even smaller borough Newry. It is often considered a region of Duncansville, despite lying outside the borough limits. As of the 2010 census, the population was 672 residents.

The town was named Foot of Ten because of its location at the foot of the tenth inclined plane of the Allegheny Portage Railroad.

== Demographics ==
Historical population
Census	Pop.	Note	%±
2020	560		—
U.S. Decennial Census

As of 2020, 560 people live in Foot of Ten.

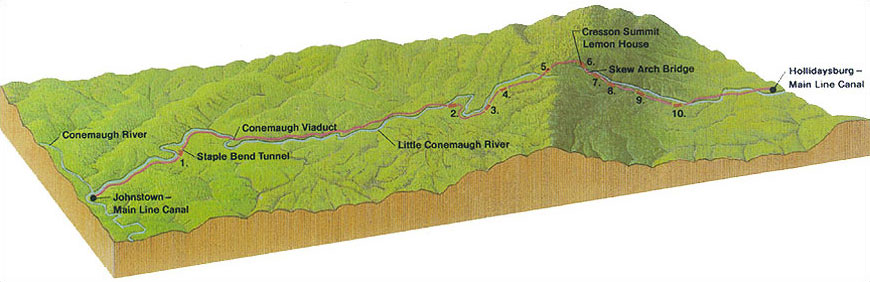
Profile of the original line of the portage railroad from Hollidaysburg, PA to Johnstown, PA. Foot of Ten lies just east of the inclined plane labeled 10.

== Education ==
The school district is Hollidaysburg Area School District.

== See also ==
- Puzzletown, a nearby unincorporated place on Puzzletown Road.
