= Blue Knob, Pennsylvania =

Unincorporated community in Pennsylvania, US

- Census-designated place
- Location within Pennsylvania Location within the United States
- Coordinates: 40°21′10″N 78°33′12″W
- Country: United States
- State: Pennsylvania
- County: Blair
- Township: Juniata

Area
  - Total: 0.089 sq mi (0.23 km^{2})
  - Land: 0.089 sq mi (0.23 km^{2})
  - Water: 0 sq mi (0.00 km^{2})
- Elevation: 2,379 ft (725 m)

Population (2020)
  - Total: 56
  - Density: 618/sq mi (238.8/km^{2})
- Time zone: UTC-5 (Eastern (EST))
  - Summer (DST): UTC-4 (EDT)
- ZIP Codes: 15946 (Portage); 16635 (Duncansville)
- Area codes: 814/582
- FIPS code: 42-07272
- GNIS feature ID: 2805467

Blue Knob is an unincorporated community and census-designated place (CDP) in Blair County, Pennsylvania, United States. It was first listed as a CDP prior to the 2020 census.

The CDP is in southwestern Blair County, at the southern end of Juniata Township. It stands atop the Allegheny Front at 2,370 feet (720 m) elevation, approximately 1 mile (1.6 km) southeast of the Eastern Continental Divide. Pennsylvania Route 164 passes through the community, leading east down the Front 7 miles (11 km) to East Freedom and west 8 miles (13 km) to Portage. Knob Road leads south from the CDP 5 miles (8 km) to Blue Knob State Park, atop Blue Knob, the second-highest peak in Pennsylvania.

== Demographics ==
Historical population
Census	Pop.	Note	%±
2020	56		—
U.S. Decennial Census

== Education ==
The school district is Hollidaysburg Area School District.
