= Spring Hill, Pennsylvania =

Unincorporated community in Pennsylvania, US

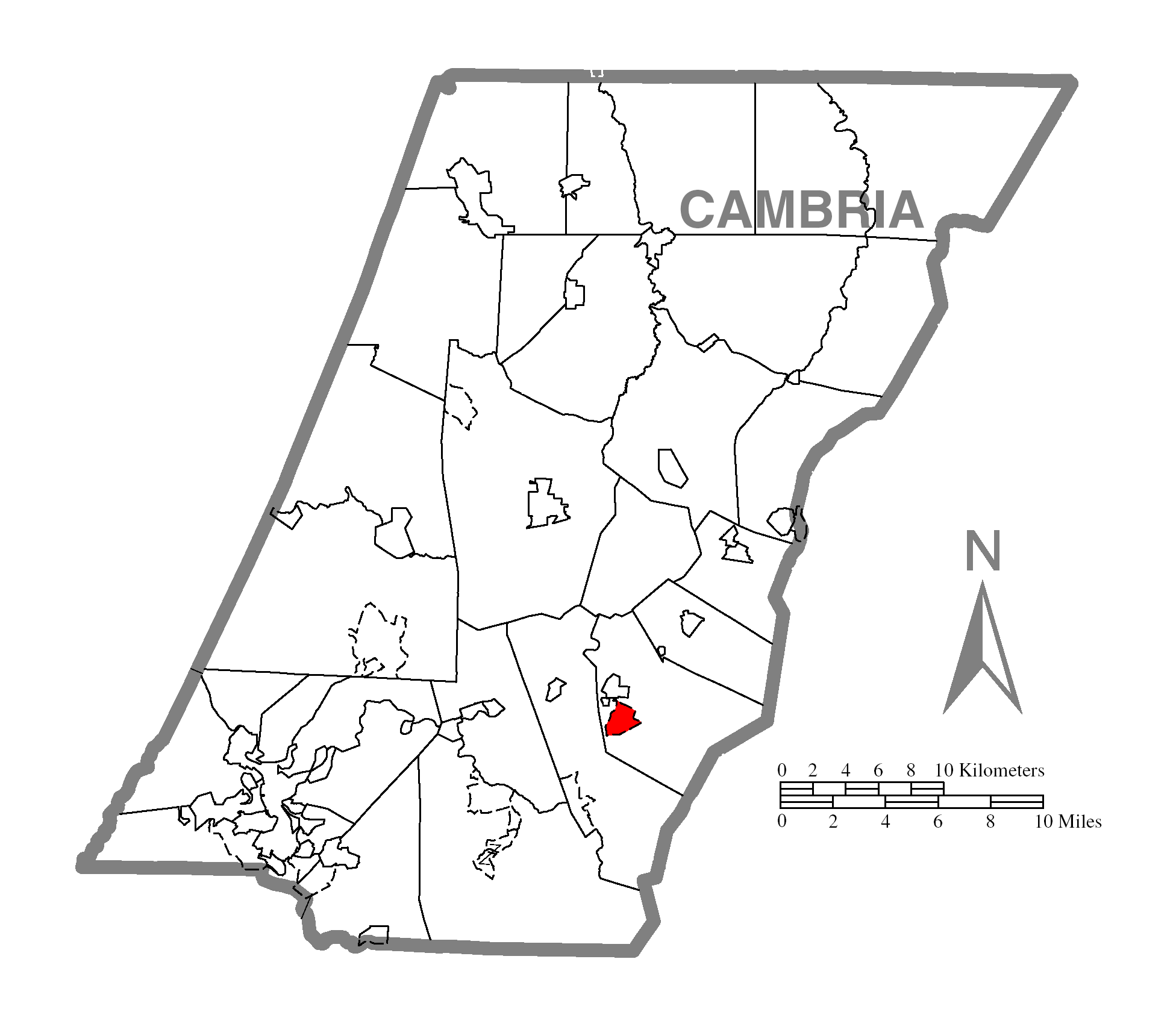

Spring Hill is a census-designated place (CDP) in Cambria County, Pennsylvania, United States. The population was 839 at the 2010 census, down from 970 at the 2000 census.

== Geography ==
Spring Hill is located in southeastern Cambria County at 40°22′28″N 78°40′03″W (40.374494, -78.667533), in the southwestern part of Portage Township. It is directly south of the borough of Portage.

According to the United States Census Bureau, the CDP has a total area of 1.0 square mile (2.7 km^{2}), all land.

== Demographics ==
As of the census of 2000, there were 970 people, 389 households, and 273 families living in the CDP. The population density was 951.1 inhabitants per square mile (367.2/km^{2}). There were 408 housing units at an average density of 400.0 per square mile (154.4/km^{2}). The racial makeup of the CDP was 98.66% White, 0.21% African American, 0.31% from other races, and 0.82% from two or more races. Hispanic or Latino of any race were 0.72% of the population.

There were 389 households, out of which 22.9% had children under the age of 18 living with them, 56.3% were married couples living together, 9.3% had a female householder with no husband present, and 29.8% were non-families. 28.0% of all households were made up of individuals, and 18.8% had someone living alone who was 65 years of age or older. The average household size was 2.48 and the average family size was 3.03.

In the CDP, the population was spread out, with 19.1% under the age of 18, 8.1% from 18 to 24, 27.0% from 25 to 44, 25.4% from 45 to 64, and 20.4% who were 65 years of age or older. The median age was 42 years. For every 100 females, there were 91.3 males. For every 100 females age 18 and over, there were 88.2 males.

The median income for a household in the CDP was $29,750, and the median income for a family was $33,472. Males had a median income of $26,750 versus $17,868 for females. The per capita income for the CDP was $16,688. About 3.5% of families and 8.2% of the population were below the poverty line, including 14.7% of those under age 18 and 19.0% of those age 65 or over.

== Education ==
It is in the Portage Area School District.

== Famous Residents ==
Alfred Henry Ackley, writer of the well-known Christian hymn "I Serve a Risen Savior" (1933), was born in Spring Hill
