= B. D. Ackley =

Gospel music composer

Bentley DeForest Ackley (September 27, 1872, in Spring Hill, Pennsylvania – September 3, 1958, in Winona Lake, Indiana) was an American musician and gospel composer.

His brother Alfred Henry "A. H." Ackley (January 21, 1887 – July 3, 1960) composed with him, and is credited with the popular hymn He Lives. As a young man, B. D. had already learned several instruments, including the melodeon, piano, cornet, clarinet and piccolo. After moving to New York City in 1888, he began playing the organ in churches.

== Biography ==
He was born on September 27, 1872, in Spring Hill, Pennsylvania.

In 1907, he joined Billy Sunday and Homer Rodeheaver, an evangelist team, as secretary-pianist, and traveled with them for eight years. As a composer and editor with the Rodeheaver Company, he wrote over 3,000 Gospel tunes.

"I met B. D. Ackley", fellow evangelist, Dr. Oswald J. Smith recalled, "in Buffalo, New York, where he was minister of music in the Churchill Tabernacle when I was preaching there one time. The first hymn I wrote with B. D. Ackley was Joy In Serving Jesus in 1931. From the time I met him and his brother, I stopped writing music altogether. They could write so much better."

He died on September 3, 1958, in Winona Lake, Indiana, aged 85. He was interred in the Oakwood Cemetery in Warsaw, Indiana.

Ackley was inducted into the Gospel Music Hall of Fame in 1991.

== Sources ==
- Kevin Mungons and Douglas Yeo, Homer Rodeheaver and the Rise of the Gospel Music Industry (Urbana: University of Illinois Press, 2021).
