= Brooks Mill, Pennsylvania =

Unincorporated community in Pennsylvania, US

- Census-designated place
- Location within Pennsylvania Location within the United States
- Coordinates: 40°22′30″N 78°25′21″W
- Country: United States
- State: Pennsylvania
- County: Blair
- Township: Blair

Area
  - Total: 0.12 sq mi (0.30 km^{2})
  - Land: 0.12 sq mi (0.30 km^{2})
  - Water: 0 sq mi (0.00 km^{2})
- Elevation: 994 ft (303 m)

Population (2020)
  - Total: 94
  - Density: 818.8/sq mi (316.13/km^{2})
- Time zone: UTC-5 (Eastern (EST))
  - Summer (DST): UTC-4 (EDT)
- ZIP Codes: 16635 (Duncansville); 16648 (Hollidaysburg)
- Area codes: 814/582
- FIPS code: 42-09196
- GNIS feature ID: 2805468

Brooks Mill is an unincorporated community and census-designated place (CDP) in Blair County, Pennsylvania, United States. It was first listed as a CDP before the 2020 census.

== Geography ==
The CDP is in southern Blair County, in the southern part of Blair Township. Pennsylvania Route 36 passes through the center of the community, leading south 1 mile (1.6 km) to East Freedom and northeast 4 miles (6 km) to Hollidaysburg.

Brooks Mill is on Halter Creek, just south of where it flows into the Frankstown Branch of the Juniata River. It is part of the Susquehanna River watershed.

== Demographics ==
Historical population
Census	Pop.	Note	%±
2020	94		—
U.S. Decennial Census

== Education ==
The school district is Hollidaysburg Area School District.
