= Jerry Stern =

American politician

Member of the Pennsylvania House of Representatives from the 80th district
- In office January 5, 1993 – January 6, 2015
- Preceded by: Edwin G. Johnson
- Succeeded by: Judy Ward

Personal details
- Born: January 11, 1955 Roaring Spring, Pennsylvania
- Died: December 11, 2024 (aged 69)
- Party: Republican
- Spouse: Susan E. Stern
- Education: Penn State Altoona

Jerry Allen Stern (January 11, 1955 – December 11, 2024) was a former member of the Pennsylvania House of Representatives from the 80th District first elected in 1992.

== Career ==
Prior to his election to the House, Stern was elected as Blair County Prothonotary and Clerk of Courts after serving as Deputy Prothonotary from 1982 to 1989.

In the legislature, Stern was appointed to the Subcommittee on Military and Veterans Facilities. He also served on the Agricultural and Rural Affairs and Children and Youth Committees.

== Personal ==
Stern was a member of the Martinsburg Sportsmen's Association, Blair County Chamber of Commerce and Blair County Farm Bureau. He also sat on the Board of Directors for Hollidaysburg American Legion Ambulance Service, Inc.

He and his wife lived in the Martinsburg area with their two children.

Stern died at his residence on December 11, 2024.

== Legacy ==
In 2025, a section of Pennsylvania Route 164 was renamed to the Jerry A. Stern Memorial Highway. Also in 2025, Mayor of Martinsburg Richard Brantner Sr declared September 18 "Jerry Stern Day" for the borough.
