= Pennsylvania Route 164 =

State highway in Pennsylvania, US

Pennsylvania Route 164

Route information
- Maintained by PennDOT
- Length: 36.463 mi (58.682 km)

Major junctions
- West end: US 22 in Munster Township
- PA 53 in Portage; I-99 / US 220 in Freedom Township; US 220 Bus. in Freedom Township; PA 867 in Roaring Spring; PA 36 from Freedom Township to Roaring Springs; PA 866 in Martinsburg
- East end: PA 26 near Raystown Lake

Location
- Country: United States
- State: Pennsylvania
- Counties: Cambria, Blair, Bedford

Highway system
- Pennsylvania State Route System; Interstate; US; State; Scenic; Legislative
← PA 163	→ PA 166

Pennsylvania Route 164 (PA 164) is a 36-mile-long (58 km) state highway located in Cambria, Blair, and Bedford counties in Pennsylvania. The western terminus is at an interchange with U.S. Route 22 (US 22) in Munster Township. The eastern terminus is at PA 26 near Raystown Lake.

== Route description ==
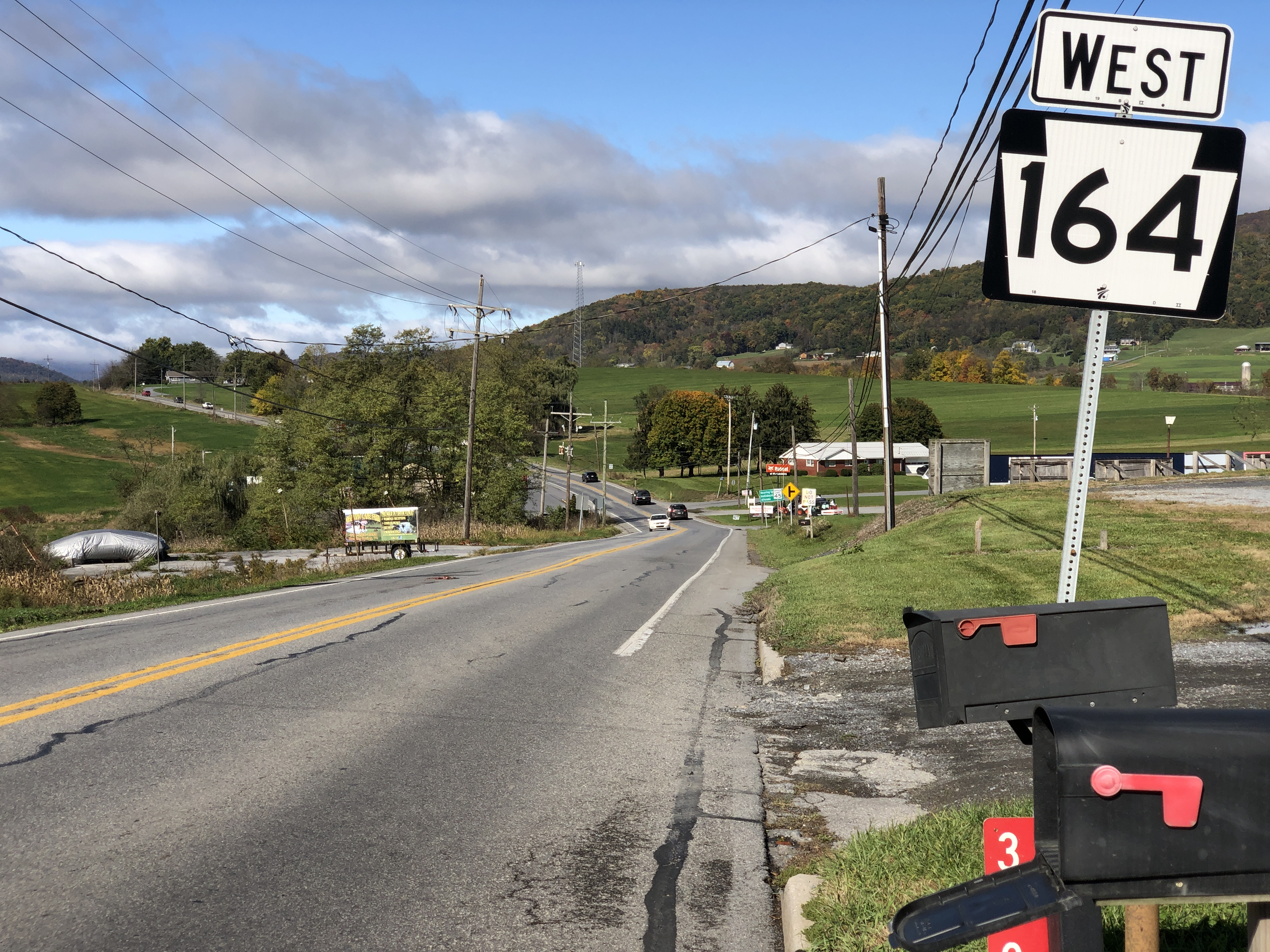
PA 164 westbound in Martinsburg

PA 164 begins at an interchange with US 22 in Munster Township, Cambria County, heading southwest on two-lane undivided Munster Road. The road runs through a mix of farmland and woodland with some homes, turning more to the south. The route heads southwest into agricultural areas, curving south to head into Portage Township. PA 164 runs through more farm fields and woods with occasional residences, turning southeast. The road turns south through residential areas before coming to an intersection with PA 53. At this point, PA 164 turns west to form a concurrency with PA 53 on Portage Street, a three-lane road with a center left-turn lane that passes businesses and becomes the border between Portage Township to the north and the borough of Portage to the south. Upon splitting from PA 53, PA 164 heads south on three-lane Main Street, passing homes and narrowing to two lanes as it crosses under Norfolk Southern's Pittsburgh Line. The route heads into the center of Portage and passes more residences and businesses, crossing another Norfolk Southern railroad line. The road passes more developed areas before crossing back into Portage Township and heading southeast on Puritan Road. PA 164 continues into forested areas, passing through the communities of Puritan and Martindale.

PA 164 enters Juniata Township in Blair County and heads east on Johnstown Road, heading from forests into a mix of farmland and woodland with some homes, passing through Blue Knob. The road heads into more forested areas with some fields as it continues into Freedom Township. Farther east, the route heads through farmland with some homes, crossing under I-99/US 220 before entering the residential community of East Freedom. Here, PA 164 comes to an intersection with US 220 Bus. and turns north to join that route on Dunnings Highway, running to the west of an Everett Railroad line. The road heads into commercial areas farther from the railroad tracks before it comes to a ramp that provides access to I-99/US 220. At this point, PA 164 splits from US 220 Bus. by turning southeast onto an unnamed four-lane divided highway, crossing the Frankstown Branch Juniata River. A short distance later, the route comes to an intersection with PA 36 at which point that route joins PA 164. The road narrows into a three-lane road with a center left-turn lane and passes over a Hollidaysburg and Roaring Spring Railroad line. PA 36/PA 164 continues through areas of homes and businesses in McKee, crossing another Hollidaysburg and Roaring Spring Railroad line before crossing Halter Creek into Blair Township. The road runs through forested areas between Dunnings Mountain to the south and Short Mountain to the north along with the railroad line and the creek, heading into Taylor Township. PA 36/PA 164 turns south and passes between the railroad line and woods to the west and the creek and a quarry to the east, coming to an intersection with the northern terminus of PA 867. At this point, the two routes continues east and cross into the borough of Roaring Spring, passing businesses. The road turns south near Nason Hospital, with PA 164 splitting from PA 136 by heading east onto two-lane East Main Street.

Here, the road passes homes as it forms the border between Taylor Township to the north and Roaring Spring to the south. The route fully enters Taylor Township again and becomes an unnamed road, heading southeast into open agricultural areas with occasional residences, passing through East Sharpsburg. The road passes more farmland as it heads into North Woodbury Township. PA 164 heads into the borough of Martinsburg and becomes West Allegheny Street, passing homes. In the center of town, the route crosses PA 866 and becomes East Allegheny Street, running past more residences. The road heads back into North Woodbury Township, becoming unnamed as it runs through more open farmland with a few residences, passing through the community of Fredericksburg. PA 164 turns southeast and begins to ascend forested Tussey Mountain, curving northeast. At the summit of the mountain, the route heads into Liberty Township in Bedford County and becomes Cove Mountain Road, turning south to descend the mountain. PA 164 continues to the base of the mountain, reaching its eastern terminus at an intersection with PA 26.

== Major intersections ==
County	Location	mi	km	Destinations	Notes
Cambria	Munster Township	0.000– 0.073	0.000– 0.117	US 22 / Munster Road (SR 1003) – Hollidaysburg, Ebensburg, Munster	Interchange; western terminus of PA 164
Cambria	Portage Township	5.784	9.308	PA 53 north (Portage Street) – Cresson	Western terminus of PA 53 concurrency
Cambria	Portage	5.955	9.584	PA 53 south (Portage Street) – South Fork	Eastern terminus of PA 53 concurrency
Blair	Freedom Township	21.455	34.528	US 220 Bus. south (Dunnings Highway) / Freedom Street (SR 2010) – Claysburg	Western terminus of US 220 Bus. concurrency
Blair	Freedom Township	22.247	35.803	I-99 / US 220 / US 220 Bus. north (Dunnings Highway) – Duncansville, Altoona, Bedford	I-99/US 220 exit 23; eastern terminus of US 220 Bus. concurrency
Blair	Freedom Township	22.445	36.122	PA 36 north – Hollidaysburg	Western terminus of PA 36 concurrency
Blair	Taylor Township	24.633	39.643	PA 867 south (Main Street) – Roaring Spring	Northern terminus of PA 867
Blair	Roaring Spring	25.462	40.977	PA 36 south (Woodbury Pike) / East Main Street – Everett, Roaring Spring	Eastern terminus of PA 36 concurrency
Blair	Martinsburg	29.486	47.453	PA 866 (Market Street) – Woodbury, Williamsburg, Altoona–Blair County Airport	
Bedford	Liberty Township	36.463	58.682	PA 26 (Raystown Road) – Everett, Huntingdon	Eastern terminus of PA 164
1.000 mi = 1.609 km; 1.000 km = 0.621 mi: Concurrency terminus
