= Bridge in Portage Township =

- U.S. National Register of Historic Places
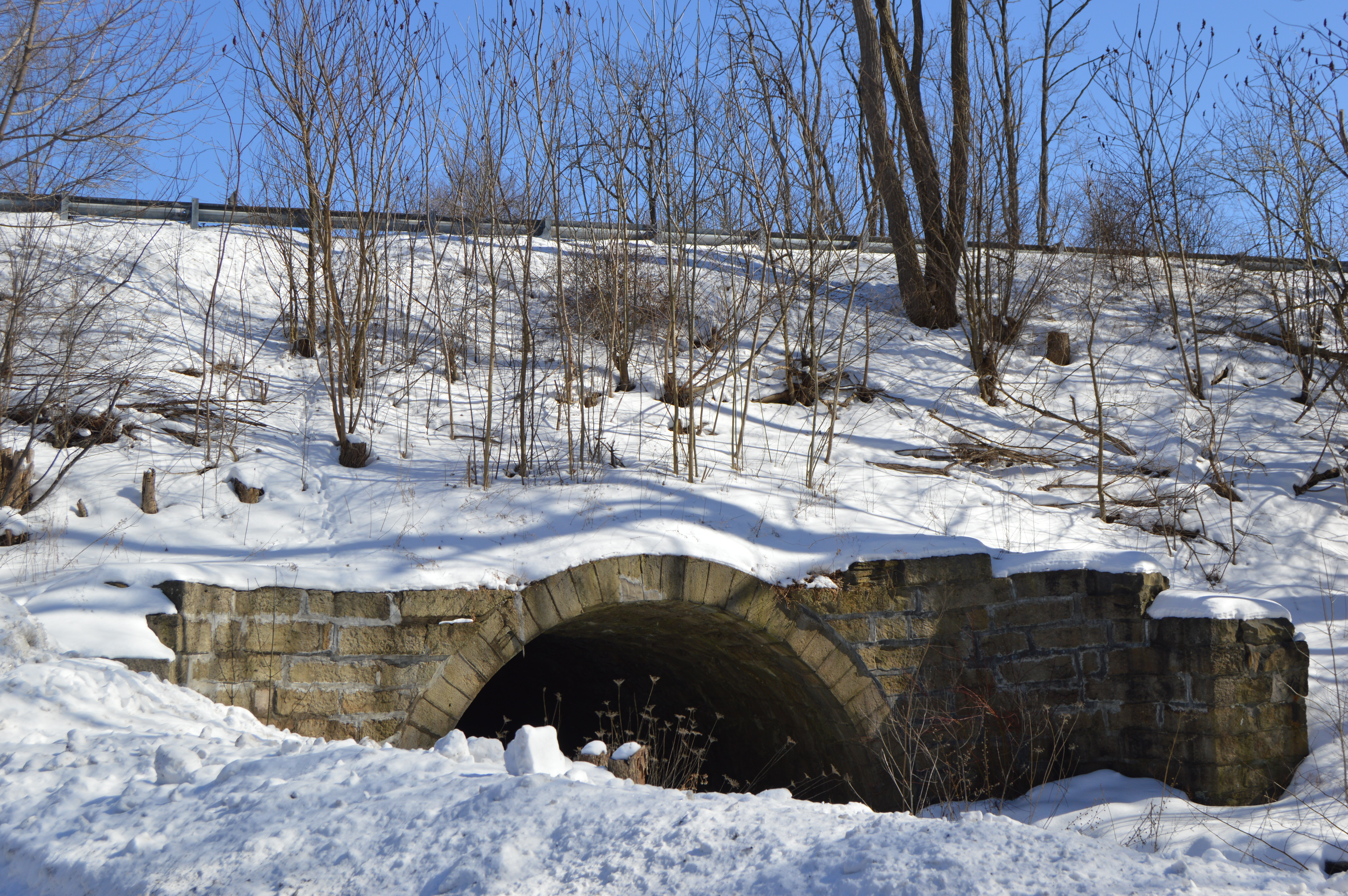
- Western side

- Location within Pennsylvania Location within the United States
- Location: Pennsylvania Route 53 over Bens Creek, Portage Township, Pennsylvania
- Coordinates: 40°24′8″N 78°38′24″W
- Area: less than one acre
- Built: 1832
- Architect: Allegheny Portage Railroad
- Architectural style: Circular arch
- MPS: Highway Bridges Owned by the Commonwealth of Pennsylvania, Department of Transportation TR
- NRHP reference No.: 88000782
- Added to NRHP: June 22, 1988

Bridge in Portage Township is a historic stone arch bridge located at Portage Township in Cambria County, Pennsylvania, United States. It was built by the Allegheny Portage Railroad in 1832, and is an 18-foot-long (5.5 m) bridge, with a semi-circular arch. It is built of coursed ashlar and crosses Bens Creek.

It was listed on the National Register of Historic Places in 1988.

== See also ==
- List of bridges documented by the Historic American Engineering Record in Pennsylvania
