= Portage Township, Cambria County, Pennsylvania =

Township in Pennsylvania, US

- Township
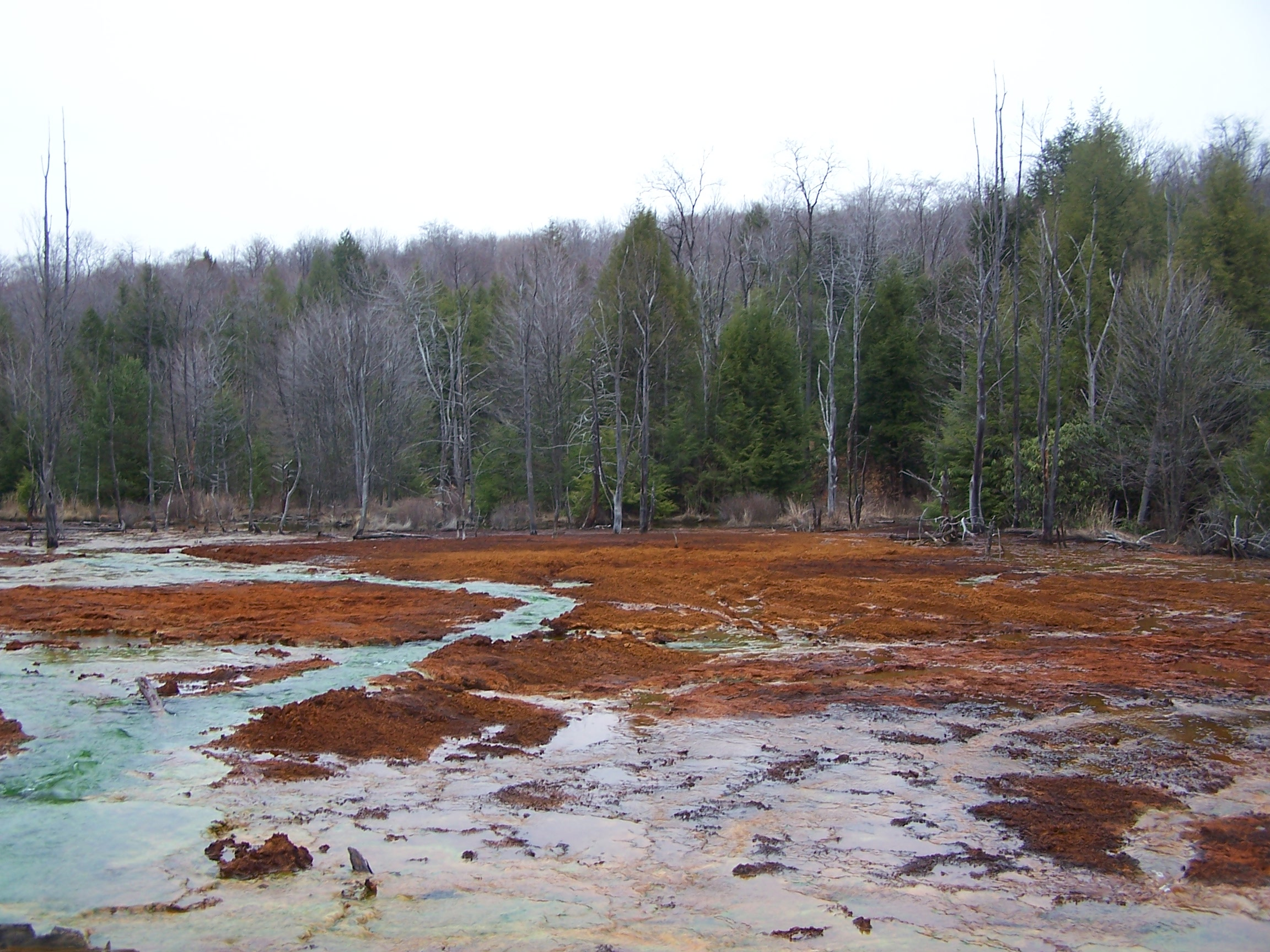
- Field and woods at the Hughes bore hole

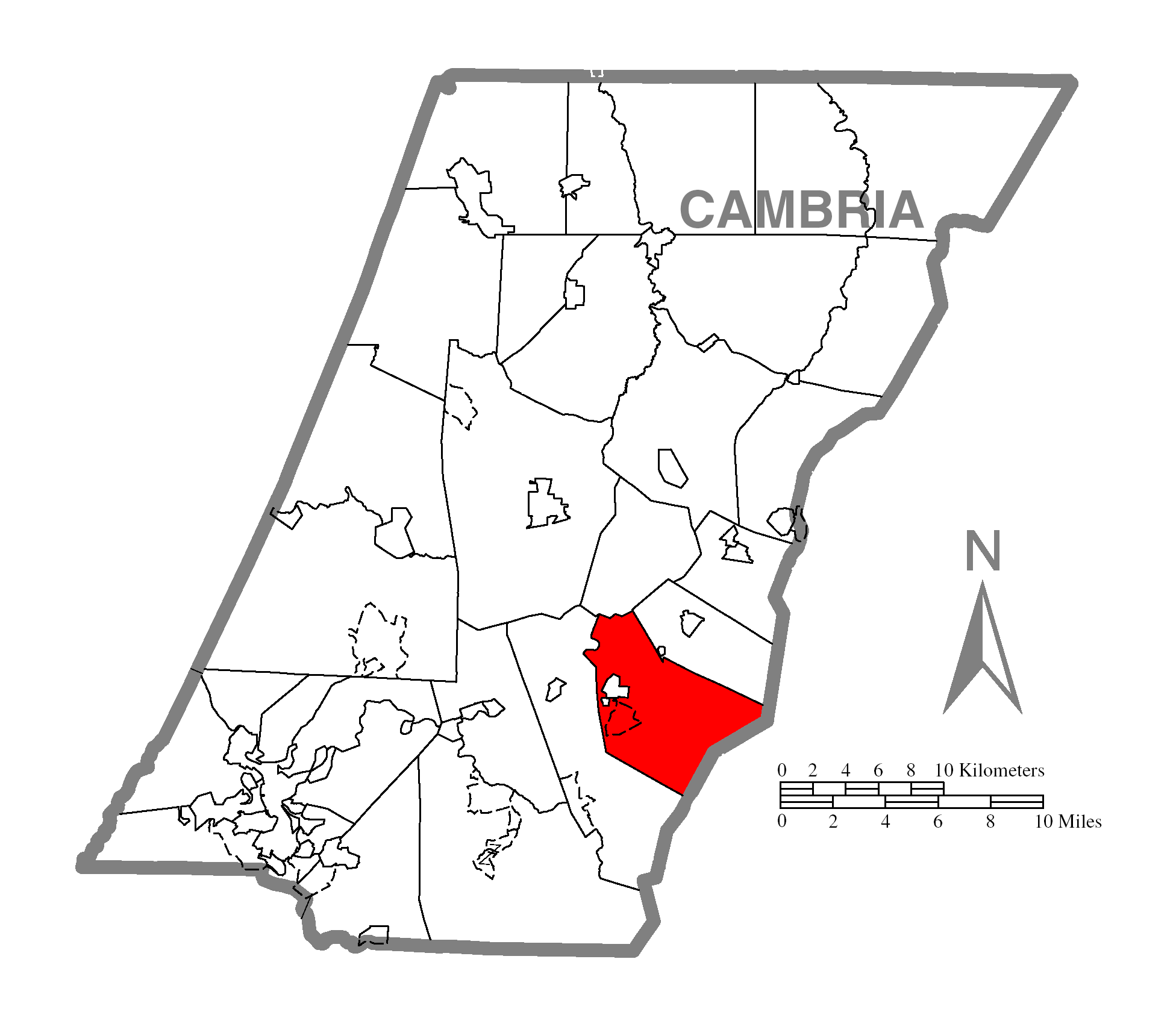
- Map of Cambria County, Pennsylvania highlighting Portage Township

- Map of Cambria County, Pennsylvania
- Country: United States
- State: Pennsylvania
- County: Cambria
- Incorporated: 1878

Area
  - Total: 24.87 sq mi (64.41 km^{2})
  - Land: 24.77 sq mi (64.16 km^{2})
  - Water: 0.097 sq mi (0.25 km^{2})

Population (2010)
  - Total: 3,640
  - Estimate (2016): 3,470
  - Density: 140.1/sq mi (54.09/km^{2})
- Time zone: UTC-5 (Eastern (EST))
  - Summer (DST): UTC-4 (EDT)
- Area code: 814
- FIPS code: 42-021-62056
- Website: portagetwp.com

Portage Township is a township in Cambria County, Pennsylvania, United States. It surrounds the borough of Portage. The township population was 3,640 at the 2010 census. It is part of the Johnstown, Pennsylvania Metropolitan Statistical Area.

== History ==
The stone-arch Bridge in Portage Township was listed on the National Register of Historic Places in 1988. The Sonman Mine explosion occurred here in 1940, killing 63 coal miners.

== Geography ==
Portage Township is located in southeastern Cambria County around the coordinates 40°18′39″N 78°56′2″W. The township surrounds the borough of Portage and touches the borough of Cassandra on its northeastern border. The unincorporated community of Spring Hill is in the southwestern part of the township, just south of Portage borough. The southeastern border of the township follows the Blair County line and approximately follows the crest of the Allegheny Front, the height of land between the Susquehanna River basin to the east and the Ohio River drainage to the west. The Little Conemaugh River flows west through the northern part of the township, leading to the Conemaugh River in Johnstown.

Portage Township is approximately 10 miles (16 km) southeast of Ebensburg, the Cambria County seat, 19 miles (31 km) northeast of Johnstown, and 25 miles (40 km) southwest of Altoona.

According to the United States Census Bureau, the township has a total area of 24.9 square miles (64.4 km^{2}), of which 24.7 square miles (64.1 km^{2}) is land and 0.1 square miles (0.3 km^{2}), or 0.39%, is water.

Due to the mountainous terrain in and around Portage Township, it has (along with other townships in the area) become host to the largest wind farm in Pennsylvania. The Allegheny Ridge Wind Farm began operating in the first quarter of 2007 and will eventually be generating 150MW of power, or roughly enough to power 75,000 homes. This wind farm consists of 75 2MW Gamesa G87 wind turbines.

== Communities ==
=== Census-designated places ===
Census-designated places are geographical areas designated by the U.S. Census Bureau for the purposes of compiling demographic data. They are not actual jurisdictions under Pennsylvania law. Other unincorporated communities, such as villages, may be listed here as well.

- Spring Hill

=== Unincorporated communities ===
- Bens Creek
- Germantown
- Jamestown
- Martindale
- Myra
- Puritan
- Sonman

== Recreation ==
A portion of the Pennsylvania State Game Lands Number 26 is located in the southwest end of the township.

== Demographics ==
Historical population
Census	Pop.	Note	%±
2000	3,906		—
2010	3,640		−6.8%
2016 (est.)	3,470		−4.7%
U.S. Decennial Census

As of the census of 2000, there were 3,906 people, 1,458 households, and 1,077 families residing in the township. The population density was 160.6 inhabitants per square mile (62.0/km^{2}). There were 1,552 housing units at an average density of 63.8 units per square mile (24.6 units/km^{2}). The racial makeup of the township was 99.10% White, 0.20% African American, 0.03% Native American, 0.15% Asian, 0.10% from other races, and 0.41% from two or more races. Hispanic or Latino of any race were 0.36% of the population.

There were 1,458 households, out of which 28.1% had children under the age of 18 living with them, 61.0% were married couples living together, 8.4% had a female householder with no husband present, and 26.1% were non-families. 24.1% of all households were made up of individuals, and 15.4% had someone living alone who was 65 years of age or older. The average household size was 2.62 and the average family size was 3.10.

In the township the population was spread out, with 21.5% under the age of 18, 8.1% from 18 to 24, 26.3% from 25 to 44, 26.5% from 45 to 64, and 17.6% who were 65 years of age or older. The median age was 41 years. For every 100 females there were 98.4 males. For every 100 females age 18 and over, there were 95.0 males.

The median income for a household in the township was $33,050, and the median income for a family was $39,849. Males had a median income of $30,799 versus $18,688 for females. The per capita income for the township was $14,846. About 5.6% of families and 12.4% of the population were below the poverty line, including 16.2% of those under age 18 and 12.9% of those age 65 or over.

== Sewage treatment ==
Sewage treatment in portions of the township is provided by the Central Mainline Sewer Authority. A dedication ceremony was held on August 21, 2006, by Congressman John Murtha. The total cost of the system was $10 million, and construction took 14 years. Central-Mainline serves over 2,000 customers and is named after the "Mainline" of the former Pennsylvania Railroad that proceeds through the five municipalities. The railway is now part of the Norfolk Southern system.
