= W. William Wilt =

American politician

Member of the Pennsylvania House of Representatives from the 80th district
- In office 1969–1976
- Preceded by: District created
- Succeeded by: Michael E. Cassidy

Member of the Pennsylvania House of Representatives from the Blair County district
- In office 1963–1968

Personal details
- Born: April 15, 1918 Altoona, Pennsylvania, US
- Died: September 28, 2004 (aged 86) Huntingdon, Pennsylvania, US
- Party: Republican

W. William Wilt (April 15, 1918 – September 28, 2004) is a former Republican member of the Pennsylvania House of Representatives.
