= Hughes bore hole =

Acid mine drainage site in Pennsylvania, US

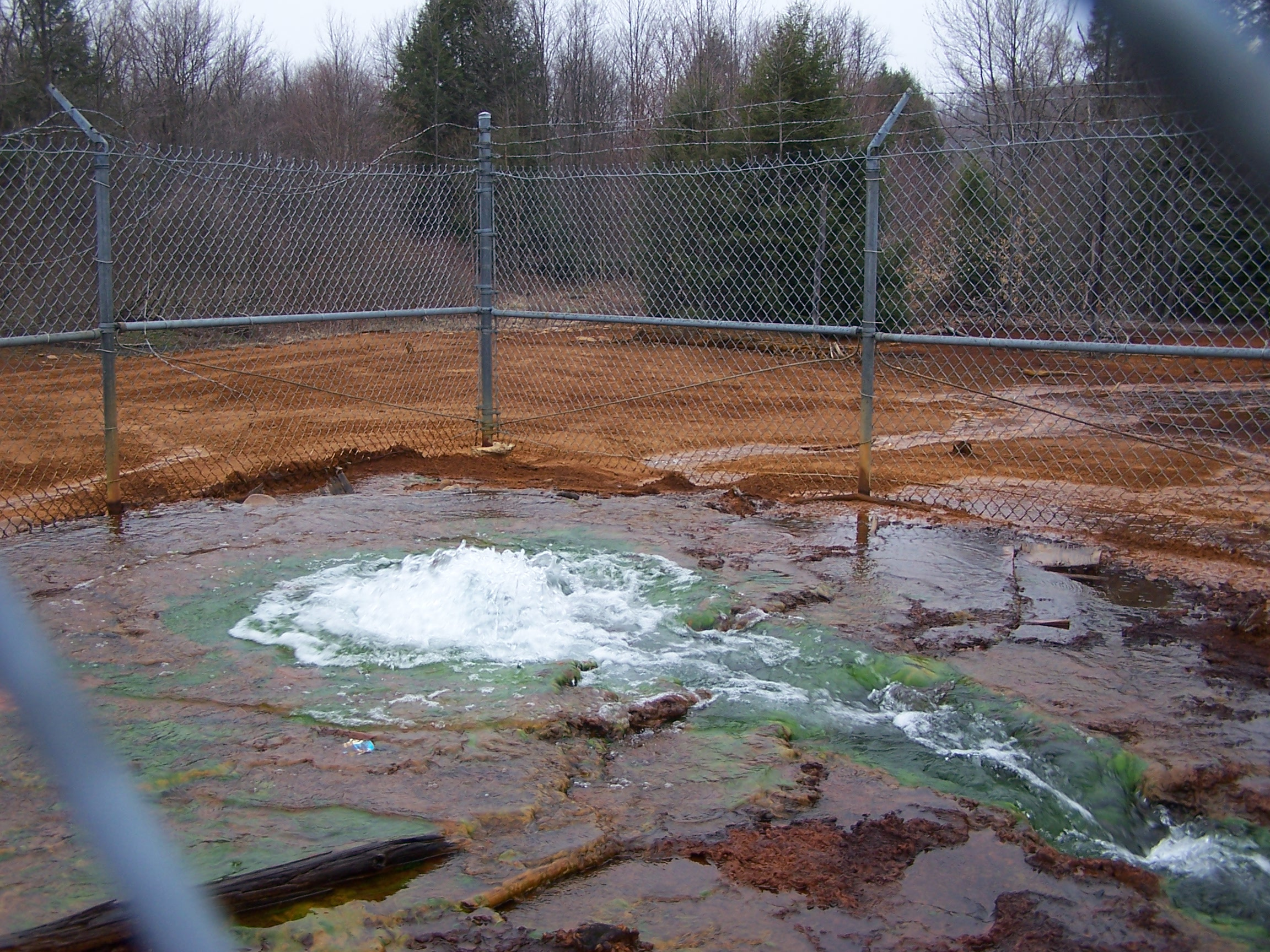
Hughes bore hole, Portage Township, Pennsylvania

The Hughes Borehole is an acid mine drainage site which is located near the southwest central borough of Portage, Pennsylvania in Cambria County.

== History ==
During the 1920s, a bore hole was drilled in order to remove water from multiple coal mines in the area. That hole was subsequently capped during the 1950s. This proved to be an unsatisfactory maintenance situation, however, because, over time, pressure gradually built up beneath the cap. By the 1970s, that pressure had increased to such an extent that it caused the cap to blow off of the bore hole, releasing an estimated water volume of 800 to 3,500 gallons per minute into the surrounding area, along with an estimated daily amount of 8,000 pounds of dissolved metals.

This environmental disaster flooded a 6-acre (24,000 m^{2}) area and polluted the nearby Little Conemaugh River.

=== Present day ===
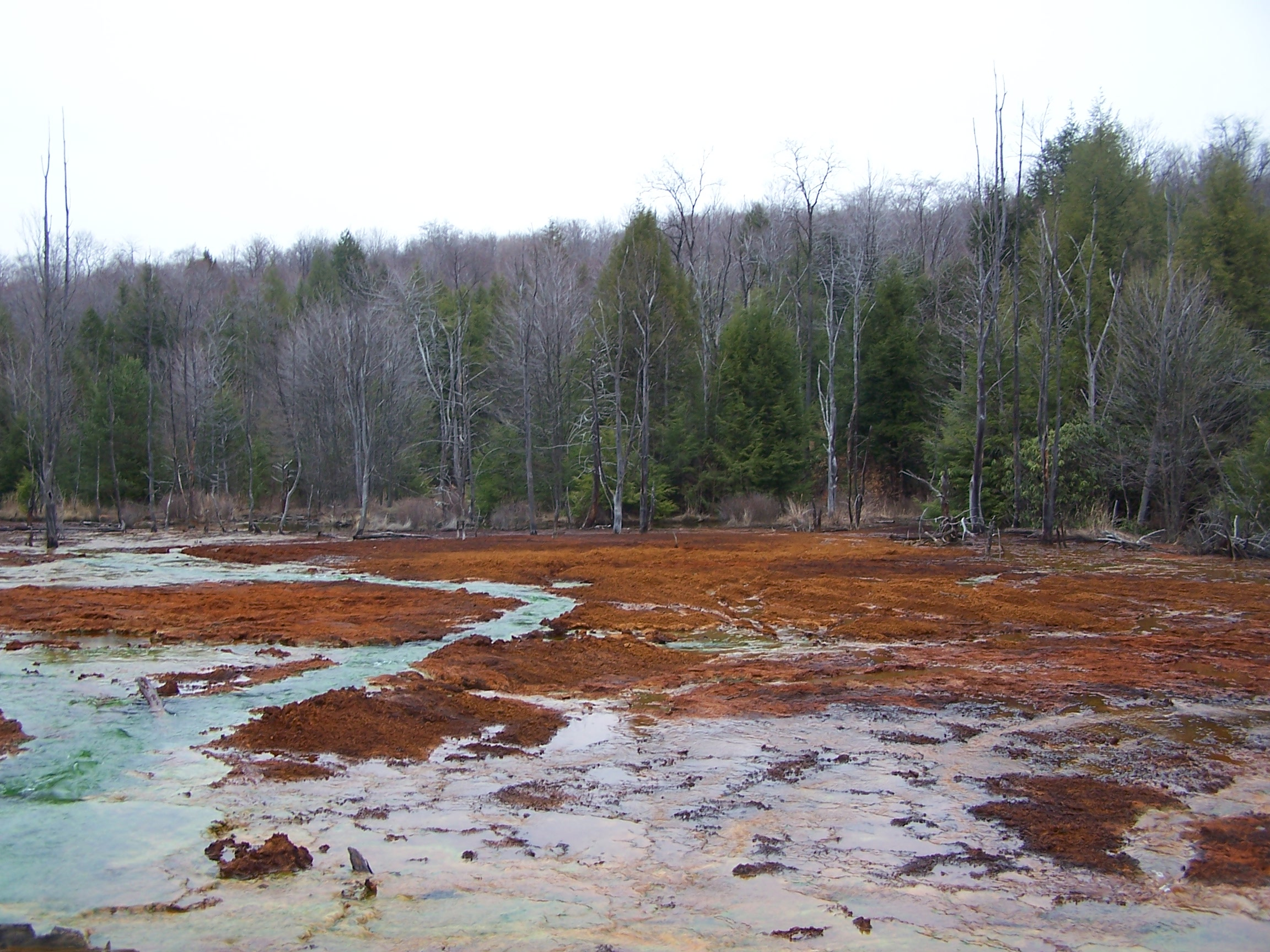
Hughes bore hole - part of the devastated area

Today, this devastated area has been compared with that of the Yellowstone Mud Pots. All that remains is bare flooded and yellowish red soil periodically spotted with dead standing trees. It also contains a large amount of green iron eating algae that adds to the color of the area. Efforts are currently underway in an attempt to mitigate the situation.
