= Penn Farms, Pennsylvania =

Unincorporated community in Pennsylvania, US

- Census-designated place
- Location within Pennsylvania Location within the United States
- Coordinates: 40°24′58″N 78°24′48″W
- Country: United States
- State: Pennsylvania
- County: Blair
- Township: Blair

Area
  - Total: 1.49 sq mi (3.85 km^{2})
  - Land: 1.49 sq mi (3.85 km^{2})
  - Water: 0 sq mi (0.00 km^{2})
- Elevation: 1,047 ft (319 m)

Population (2020)
  - Total: 2,307
  - Density: 1,551.3/sq mi (598.97/km^{2})
- Time zone: UTC-5 (Eastern (EST))
  - Summer (DST): UTC-4 (EDT)
- ZIP Code: 16635 (Duncansville)
- Area codes: 814/582
- FIPS code: 42-58950
- GNIS feature ID: 2805539

Penn Farms is an unincorporated community and census-designated place (CDP) in Blair County, Pennsylvania, United States. It was first listed as a CDP prior to the 2020 census.

The CDP is in south-central Blair County, in the northern part of Blair Township. It is bordered to the northeast by Hollidaysburg, the county seat, and to the north by Duncansville. Interstate 99 forms the northwestern edge of the CDP, and Pennsylvania Route 36 forms the eastern edge. It is 9 miles (14 km) south of Altoona.

== Demographics ==
Historical population
Census	Pop.	Note	%±
2020	2,307		—
U.S. Decennial Census

== Education ==
The school district is Hollidaysburg Area School District.
