= Michael E. Cassidy =

American politician

Member of the Pennsylvania House of Representatives from the 80th district
- In office 1977–1978
- Preceded by: W. William Wilt
- Succeeded by: Edwin G. Johnson

Personal details
- Born: Michael Edward Cassidy; September 15, 1955 (age 70)
- Party: Democratic

Michael Edward Cassidy (born September 15, 1955) is a former Democratic member of the Pennsylvania House of Representatives. He was the youngest representative in the Pennsylvania House of Representatives in history.

Cassidy won his first primary for the 80th district in Blair County, aged 20. When he was sworn in, he had celebrated his 21st birthday two months earlier, making him eligible to serve in the House according to the Pennsylvania Constitution.

Currently, Cassidy is the executive director to the Democratic Human Services Committee under Representative Mark B. Cohen and the managing editor for Commonwealth: A Journal of Political Science. He is also an adjunct professor through Temple University - Harrisburg.

== Published works ==
- Looking back at the Legislative Modernization Movement in Pennsylvania: Remarks of Herbert Fineman, Former Speaker of the Pennsylvania House of Representatives with introduction and commentary, COMMONWEALTH: A Journal of Political Science (2003) Vol. 12; pp. 87–110
- Roundtable Discussion as Oral History: The Legislative Modernization panel at the 2003 Pennsylvania Political Science Association Annual Meeting, Pennsylvania Political Scientist. Newsletter of the Pennsylvania Political Science Association (June 2007)
