= Scott Barger =

American politician

Member of the Pennsylvania House of Representatives from the 80th district
- Incumbent
- Assumed office 2025
- Preceded by: Jim Gregory

Personal details
- Born: Altoona, Pennsylvania, U.S.
- Party: Republican
- Education: Grace College

Scott Barger is an American politician, business man, and a former radio host and pastor. A Republican, he is the representative for the 80th district in the Pennsylvania House of Representatives. Barger defeated incumbent representative Jim Gregory in the 2024 Republican primary election with 54% of the vote, and faced no Democratic opposition in the general election.

Barger was born and raised in Altoona, Pennsylvania, and resides in Hollidaysburg, Pennsylvania with his wife and children. He is a graduate of Blair County Christian School and earned degrees from Grace College.

== House of Representatives ==
For the 2025–2026 session, Barger sits on the following committees:

- Children & Youth
- Commerce
- Labor & Industry
- State Government
- Tourism, Recreation & Economic Development
