= Munster Township, Pennsylvania =

Township in Pennsylvania, US

Coordinates: 40°30′03″N 78°40′02″W

- Township
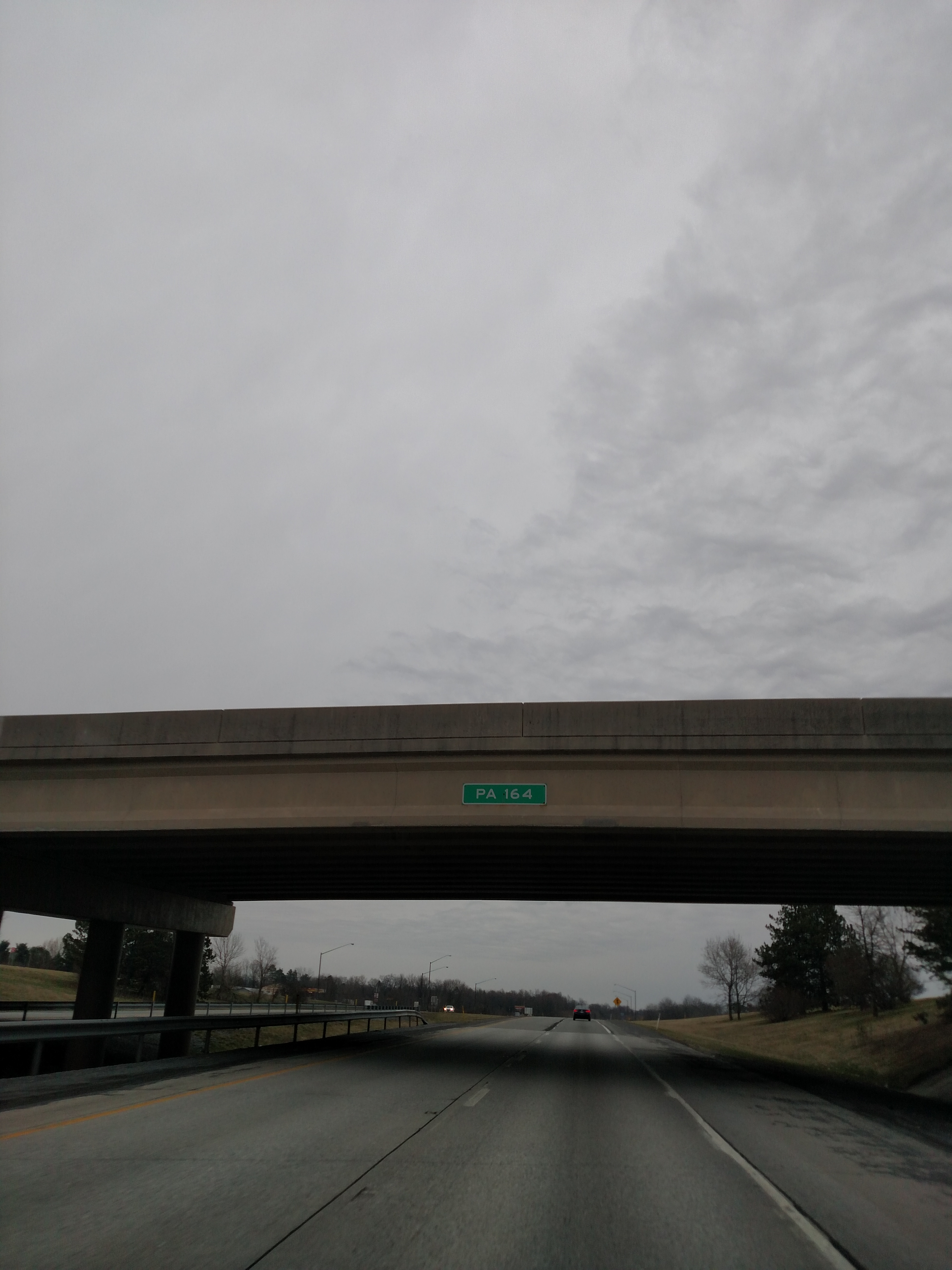
- US 22 at the PA 164 interchange in Munster Township

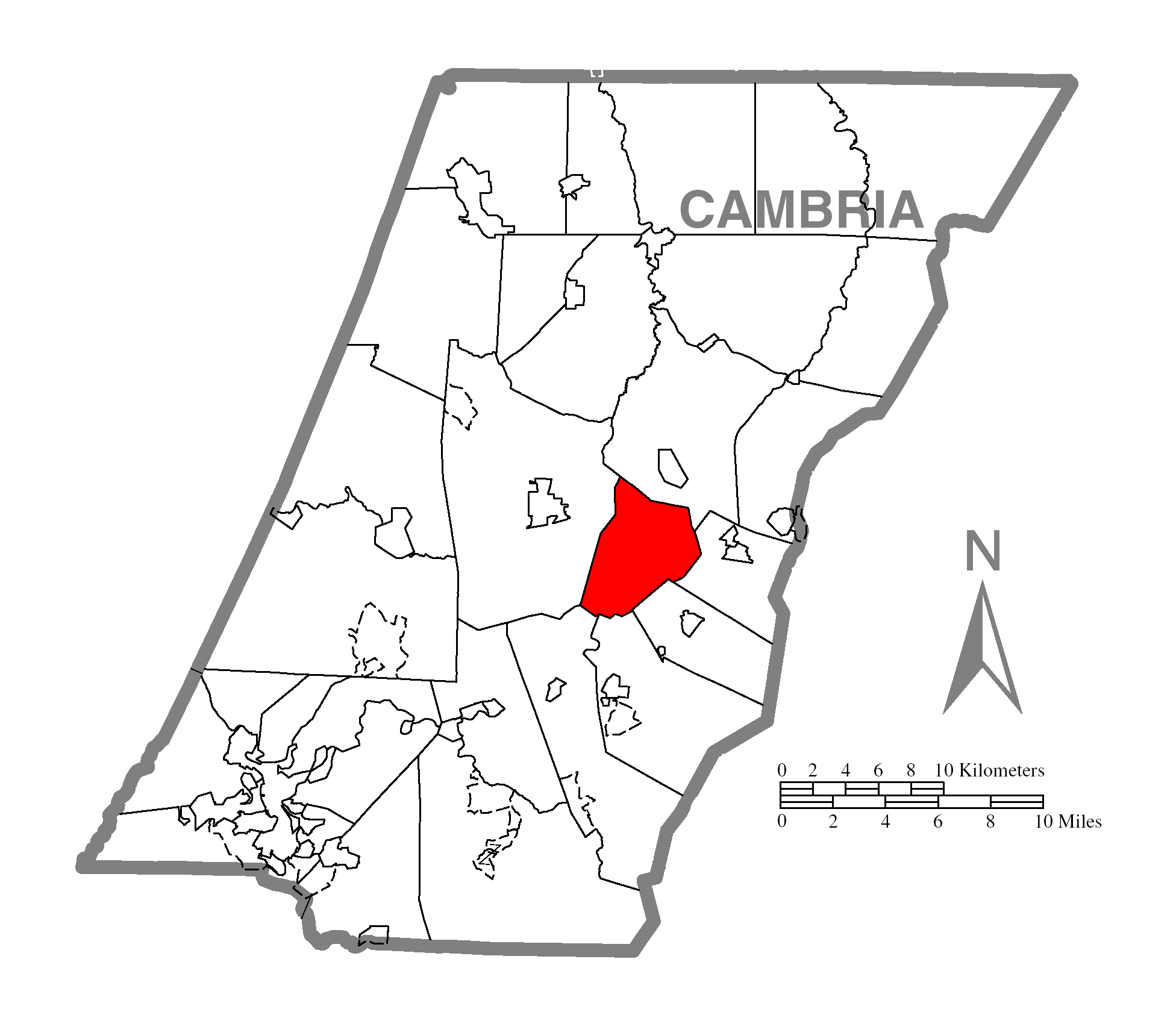
- Location of Munster Township in Cambria County, Pennsylvania

- Location of Cambria County in Pennsylvania
- Country: United States
- State: Pennsylvania
- County: Cambria
- Incorporated: 1854

Area
  - Total: 14.13 sq mi (36.60 km^{2})
  - Land: 14.06 sq mi (36.42 km^{2})
  - Water: 0.066 sq mi (0.17 km^{2})

Population (2010)
  - Total: 690
  - Estimate (2016): 672
  - Density: 47.8/sq mi (18.45/km^{2})
- Time zone: UTC-5 (Eastern (EST))
  - Summer (DST): UTC-4 (EDT)
- Area code: 814
- FIPS code: 42-021-52360

Munster Township is a township that is located in Cambria County, Pennsylvania, United States. The population was 690 at the time of the 2010 census. It is part of the Johnstown, Pennsylvania Metropolitan Statistical Area.

== History ==
The township was perhaps named after the province of Munster in Ireland.

== Geography ==
Munster Township is located east of the center of Cambria County around the coordinates 40.45 N by 78.7 W, about 5 miles (8 km) east of Ebensburg, the county seat, and 18 miles (29 km) west-southwest of Altoona. The unincorporated community of Munster is situated in the center of the township.

U.S. Route 22, a four-lane expressway, crosses the center of the township from east to west, with one exit at the village of Munster.

According to the United States Census Bureau, Munster Township has a total area of 14.1 square miles (36.6 km^{2}), 14.1 square miles (36.4 km^{2}) of which is land and 0.08 square miles (0.2 km^{2}), or 0.42%, of which is water.

== Communities ==
=== Unincorporated communities ===
- Kaylor
- Luckett
- Munster

== Demographics ==
Historical population
Census	Pop.	Note	%±
2000	675		—
2010	690		2.2%
2016 (est.)	672		−2.6%
U.S. Decennial Census

As of the census of 2000, there were 675 people, 227 households, and 177 families residing in the township.

The population density was 47.8 inhabitants per square mile (18.5/km^{2}). There were 240 housing units at an average density of 17.0/sq mi (6.6/km^{2}).

The racial makeup of the township was 99.56% White, 0.15% African American, and 0.30% from two or more races.

There were 227 households, out of which 37.0% had children under the age of eighteen living with them; 68.7% were married couples living together, 5.7% had a female householder with no husband present, and 22.0% were non-families. 18.5% of all households were made up of individuals, and 7.5% had someone living alone who was sixty-five years of age or older.

The average household size was 2.95 and the average family size was 3.38.

Within the township, the population was spread out, with 25.6% of residents who were under the age of eighteen, 11.3% who were eighteen to twenty-four, 27.3% who were twenty-five to forty-four, 25.2% forty-five to sixty-four, and 10.7% who were sixty-five years of age or older. The median age was thirty-seven years.

For every one hundred females, there were 101.5 males. For every one hundred females aged eighteen or older, there were 100.8 males.

The median income for a household in the township was $42,188, and the median income for a family was $45,000. Males had a median income of $31,667 compared with that of $19,833 for females.

The per capita income for the township was $15,762.

Approximately 4.8% of families and 6.7% of the population were living below the poverty line, including 7.4% of those who were aged sixty-five or older. No residents under the age of eighteen were impoverished.
