= Newry, Pennsylvania =

Borough in Pennsylvania, US

- Borough
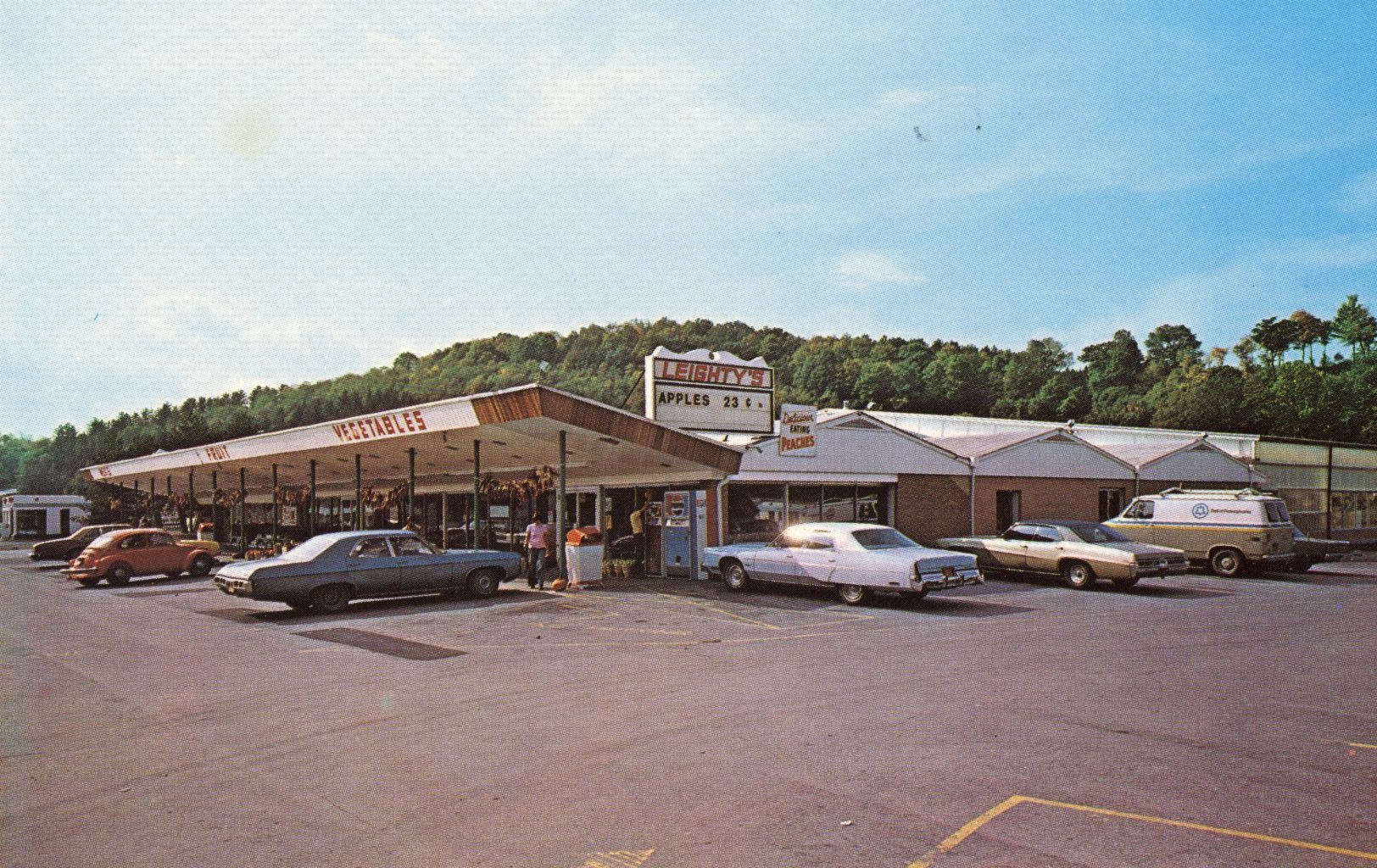
- Farmers market

- Location of Newry in Blair County, Pennsylvania.

- Location within Pennsylvania
- Coordinates: 40°23′36″N 78°26′09″W
- Country: United States
- State: Pennsylvania
- County: Blair
- Settled: 1793
- Incorporated: 1876

Government
  - Type: Borough Council

Area
  - Total: 0.097 sq mi (0.25 km^{2})
  - Land: 0.097 sq mi (0.25 km^{2})
  - Water: 0 sq mi (0.00 km^{2})
- Elevation: 1,050 ft (320 m)

Population (2020)
  - Total: 230
  - Density: 2,344.9/sq mi (905.39/km^{2})
- Time zone: UTC-5 (Eastern (EST))
  - Summer (DST): UTC-4 (EDT)
- Zip code: 16665
- Area code: 814
- FIPS code: 42-54024
- GNIS feature ID: 1214944

Newry is a borough in Blair County, Pennsylvania, United States. The population was 231 at the 2020 census. It is part of the Altoona, PA Metropolitan Statistical Area and one of the communities comprising the Altoona Urban Area.

It was named after Newry in Northern Ireland. The town was founded in 1793 by Patrick Cassidy, an Irish immigrant who named it after his hometown.

== Geography ==
According to the United States Census Bureau, the borough has a total area of 0.1 square miles (0.26 km^{2}), all land.

South of Newry, the stream known as Poplar Run flows to the east towards the Frankstown Branch of the Juniata River.

== Demographics ==
Historical population
| Census | Pop. | Note | %± |
|---|---|---|---|
| 1880 | 326 | | — |
| 1890 | 335 | | 2.8% |
| 1900 | 350 | | 4.5% |
| 1910 | 380 | | 8.6% |
| 1920 | 397 | | 4.5% |
| 1930 | 394 | | −0.8% |
| 1940 | 417 | | 5.8% |
| 1950 | 412 | | −1.2% |
| 1960 | 432 | | 4.9% |
| 1970 | 444 | | 2.8% |
| 1980 | 353 | | −20.5% |
| 1990 | 288 | | −18.4% |
| 2000 | 245 | | −14.9% |
| 2010 | 270 | | 10.2% |
| 2020 | 230 | | −14.8% |
| 2021 (est.) | 235 | ▲ | 2.2% |

As of the census of 2000, there were 245 people, 107 households, and 61 families residing in the borough. The population density was 2,550.2 inhabitants per square mile (984.6/km^{2}). There were 116 housing units at an average density of 1,207.4 per square mile (466.2/km^{2}). The racial makeup of the borough was 97.14% White, 0.82% African American, 0.82% from other races, and 1.22% from two or more races. Hispanic or Latino of any race were 1.22% of the population.

There were 107 households, out of which 29.9% had children under the age of 18 living with them, 44.9% were married couples living together, 10.3% had a female householder with no husband present, and 42.1% were non-families. 38.3% of all households were made up of individuals, and 9.3% had someone living alone who was 65 years of age or older. The average household size was 2.26 and the average family size was 3.08.

In the borough the population was spread out, with 24.9% under the age of 18, 7.8% from 18 to 24, 29.0% from 25 to 44, 24.9% from 45 to 64, and 13.5% who were 65 years of age or older. The median age was 36 years. For every 100 females there were 92.9 males. For every 100 females age 18 and over, there were 84.0 males.

The median income for a household in the borough was $24,688, and the median income for a family was $39,375. Males had a median income of $38,500 versus $18,333 for females. The per capita income for the borough was $14,949. About 14.5% of families and 14.2% of the population were below the poverty line, including 15.6% of those under the age of eighteen and 7.4% of those sixty five or over.

== History ==
During the late 18th century, Patrick Cassidy, a native of Newry, Ireland and an American soldier in the American Revolutionary War, purchased three hundred acres of land in Huntingdon County, Pennsylvania. This is now known as Blair County. C. 1793, where he constructed a small town on the land, which he named for his home.

A half-century later, Newry flourished as the Allegheny Portage Railroad began to carry passengers from Hollidaysburg across the Alleghenies to Johnstown. Newry's location made it a suitable stop for the railroad and this new influx of visitors stimulated the economy of the town. This prosperity lasted from the 1830s to the 1850s, when the railroad closed.

During the following century, the town decreased in population and quietly shifted from an urban to a rural center until the 1950s, when migration of Altoonans from the north began to increase the size of Newry and gave it a more suburban character.

== Businesses and institutions ==
The majority of Newry's businesses are found along the main north-south road, Old Route 220: just north of the town, a storage company and a small motor vehicles store; within Newry, several crafts shops and an electronics repair store; and immediately to the south, the largest business in the town, Leighty's, which comprises a convenience store, a computer systems, parts, and repair store, a golf driving range, a hunting outfitter, a flea market, a flower store, a gas station, and a bathroom and kitchen remodeling store.

Along Patrick Lane, the southmost east-west road in the town, are located a post office, a small apartment building, a furniture store, a used home appliances and furniture store, and St. Patrick's Parish, a Roman Catholic parish, and an elementary school.

== Education ==
The school district is Hollidaysburg Area School District.

== Events ==
The two yearly events celebrated by the community, both held by St. Patrick's Parish, are the Lenten fish fries, held in the cafeteria of the school, and the summer festival, held near the end of July or early August on the school playground and in the gymnasium. Both attract visitors from across the Altoona metropolis and greatly benefit the church and school.

== Surrounding areas ==
To the north of Newry, Old Route 220 leads to Duncansville and then to Altoona and other points north.

To the west, the Puzzletown Road curves to the southwest through a few miles of housing developments and into Puzzletown, where it becomes Knob Run Road, continues south-southwest up the Appalachian Plateau, up the mountain of Blue Knob and reaches the town of the same name.

To the south, 220 leads through Leamersville and East Freedom, near McKee, and intersects with Interstate 99; it leads eventually to Bedford.

To the east, the Catfish Road goes through a few miles of sparse farmland, interrupted by a few houses and a monastery, until it intersects Route 36, which leads north to Hollidaysburg and south to Roaring Spring.
