= Sonman Mine explosion =

Coordinates: 40.392°N 78.656°W

The Sonman Mine Explosion occurred on July 15, 1940, at the Sonman Shaft Coal Co. in Portage Township, near Portage, Pennsylvania, in the United States. 63 miners died out of the estimated 90 trapped in the mine after the initial explosion. The explosion was centered in a section of the slope called the Right No. 16 heading. The rescue effort was hampered by the deadly methane gas which was presumed to have filled the chamber.

A memorial to the miners who died in the explosion was commissioned and originally placed in the UMWA Hall in Jamestown, Pennsylvania. In 1960, The memorial was relocated to the Crichton-McCormick Park in Portage. The Portage Station Museum offers a documentary about the disaster titled "63 Men Down - The Sonman Mine Explosion" along with coal mine and railroad artifacts and exhibits.
