= Fort Fetter, Pennsylvania =

Unincorporated community in Pennsylvania, US

Coordinates: 40°25′48″N 78°24′15″W

Fort Fetters, Pennsylvania
- Census-designated place
- Location within Pennsylvania Location within the United States
- Country: United States
- State: Pennsylvania
- County: Blair
- Township: Blair

Area
  - Total: 0.20 km^{2} (0.077 sq mi)
  - Land: 0.20 km^{2} (0.077 sq mi)
  - Water: 0.00 km^{2} (0 sq mi)
- Elevation: 291 m (955 ft)

Population (2020)
  - Total: 175
  - Density: 865.96/km^{2} (2,242.8/sq mi)
- Time zone: UTC-5 (Eastern (EST))
  - Summer (DST): UTC-4 (EDT)
- ZIP Code: 16648 (Hollidaysburg)
- Area codes: 814/582
- FIPS code: 42-26776
- GNIS feature ID: 2805498

Fort Fetters is a neighborhood and census-designated place (CDP) in Blair County, Pennsylvania, United States. It was first listed as a CDP prior to the 2020 census.

== Geography ==
The CDP is in central Blair County, in the north part of Blair Township. It is bordered to the north, east, and south by the borough of Hollidaysburg. U.S. Route 22 (Broad Street) runs next to the southern edge of the CDP, while the parallel Altoona–Hollidaysburg line of the Norfolk Southern Railway forms the actual CDP/borough boundary. US 22 leads east into Hollidaysburg and west 1 mile (1.6 km) to Duncansville.

Beaverdam Branch, an east-flowing tributary of the Frankstown Branch of the Juniata River, runs through the northern part of the CDP.

== Demographics ==
Historical population
Census	Pop.	Note	%±
2020	175		—
U.S. Decennial Census
