= Jim Gregory (politician) =

American politician

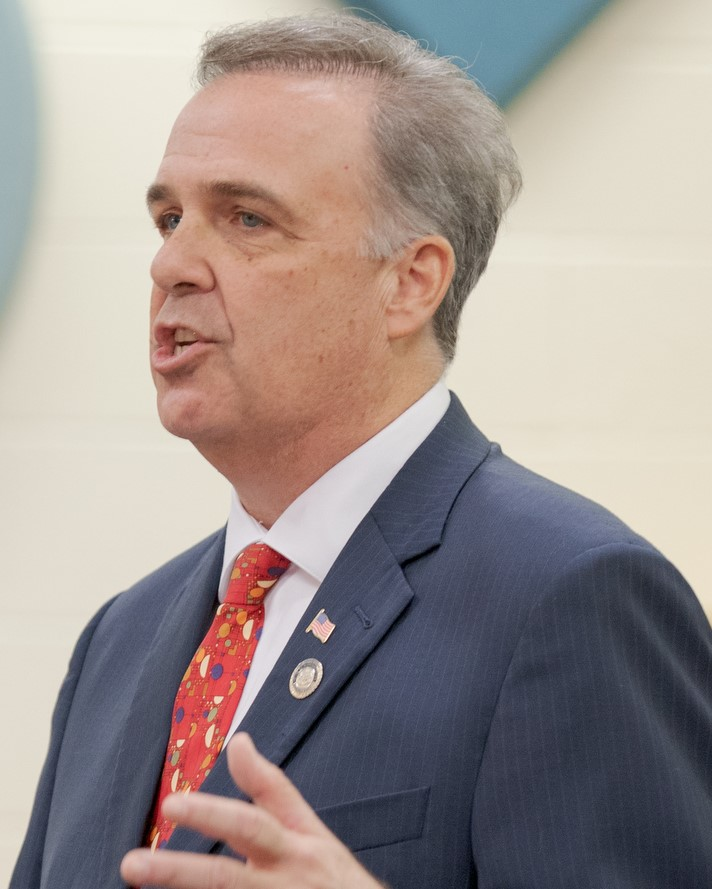

Member of the Pennsylvania House of Representatives from the 80th district
- In office December 1, 2018 – November 30, 2024
- Preceded by: Judy Ward
- Succeeded by: Scott Barger

Personal details
- Party: Republican
- Spouse: Lynn
- Children: 2
- Education: Ohio University

Jim Gregory is an American politician. A Republican, he represented the 80th district in the Pennsylvania House of Representatives from 2018 to 2024.

On January 3, 2023, Gregory nominated Mark Rozzi for Speaker of the House, making him the first Independent Speaker in Pennsylvania.

Prior to his political career he was a sportscaster for WTAJ-TV broadcasting from Altoona, Pennsylvania.

== Political career ==
Gregory was elected to represent the 80th district in the Pennsylvania House of Representatives in 2018. He sits on the following committees:

- Aging & Older Adult Services (Secretary)
- Human Services (Secretary)
- Labor & Industry
- Local Government
- Tourism & Recreational Development

In 2020, Rep. Jim Gregory faced no competition in either the Republican primary or general election. On December 1, 2020, Rep. Gregory announced his intention to eliminate Act 77 (Mail-in voting).

Due to his vote on Act 77, Republican State Committeewoman Patricia Haight mounted a challenge in the Republican primary in 2022. Gregory easily bested Haight, winning over 3/4 of the vote. He went on to beat Democrat Kim Capenos with 80% of the vote in the November general election.

In 2024, following Gregory's surprise nomination and subsequent vote for Mark Rozzi for Speaker, former WRTA radio announcer and County Commissioner candidate Scott Barger announced his candidacy for the 80th district. The race generated notable interest from interest groups such as the Citizens Alliance of Pennsylvania, with hundreds of thousands of dollars pouring into the safely Republican district. In the April primary, Scott Barger beat Jim Gregory by roughly 10%, leading Gregory to retire from electoral politics in December 2024 once his term ended.

== Electoral record ==
2018 Republican primary election: Pennsylvania House of Representatives, District 80
Party	Candidate	Votes	%
Republican	Jim Gregory	4,521	52.5%
Republican	Christopher Creek	4,096	47.5%

2018 general election: Pennsylvania House of Representatives, District 80
Party	Candidate	Votes	%
Republican	Jim Gregory	17,889	74.4%
Democratic	Laura Burke	6,164	25.6%

2020 Republican primary election: Pennsylvania House of Representatives, District 80
Party	Candidate	Votes	%
Republican	Jim Gregory	10,422	100%

2020 general election: Pennsylvania House of Representatives, District 80
Party	Candidate	Votes	%
Republican	Jim Gregory	30,950	100%

2022 Republican primary election: Pennsylvania House of Representatives, District 80
Party	Candidate	Votes	%
Republican	Jim Gregory	9,638	78.5%
Republican	Patricia Haight	2,625	21.5%

2022 general election: Pennsylvania House of Representatives, District 80
Party	Candidate	Votes	%
Republican	Jim Gregory	22,764	80.9%
Democratic	Kimberly Capenos	5,367	19.1%

2024 Republican primary election: Pennsylvania House of Representatives, District 80
Party	Candidate	Votes	%
Republican	Scott Barger	5,945	54%
Republican	Jim Gregory	5,056	46%
