= Edwin G. Johnson =

American politician

Member of the Pennsylvania House of Representatives from the 80th district
- In office 1979–1992
- Preceded by: Michael E. Cassidy
- Succeeded by: Jerry Stern

Personal details
- Born: February 15, 1922 Altoona, Pennsylvania
- Died: May 6, 1999 (aged 77) Las Vegas, Nevada
- Party: Republican

Edwin G. Johnson (February 15, 1922 – May 6, 1999) was a Republican member of the Pennsylvania House of Representatives.

== Biography ==
He was born in Altoona, Pennsylvania. He graduated from Altoona High School in 1941. The next year, he joined the United States Army Air Forces, where he served until the end of World War II.

He then studied at Pennsylvania State University and the University of Pennsylvania.

He worked as a supervisor with the Internal Revenue Service, the tax collecting army of the United States government.

He was elected to the state legislature in 1978 for a term beginning in 1979. He served until 1993, deciding not to run for reelection in 1992.

He died in Las Vegas in 1999.
