= Freedom Township, Blair County, Pennsylvania =

Township in Pennsylvania, US

Coordinates: 40°21′31″N 78°28′05″W

- Township
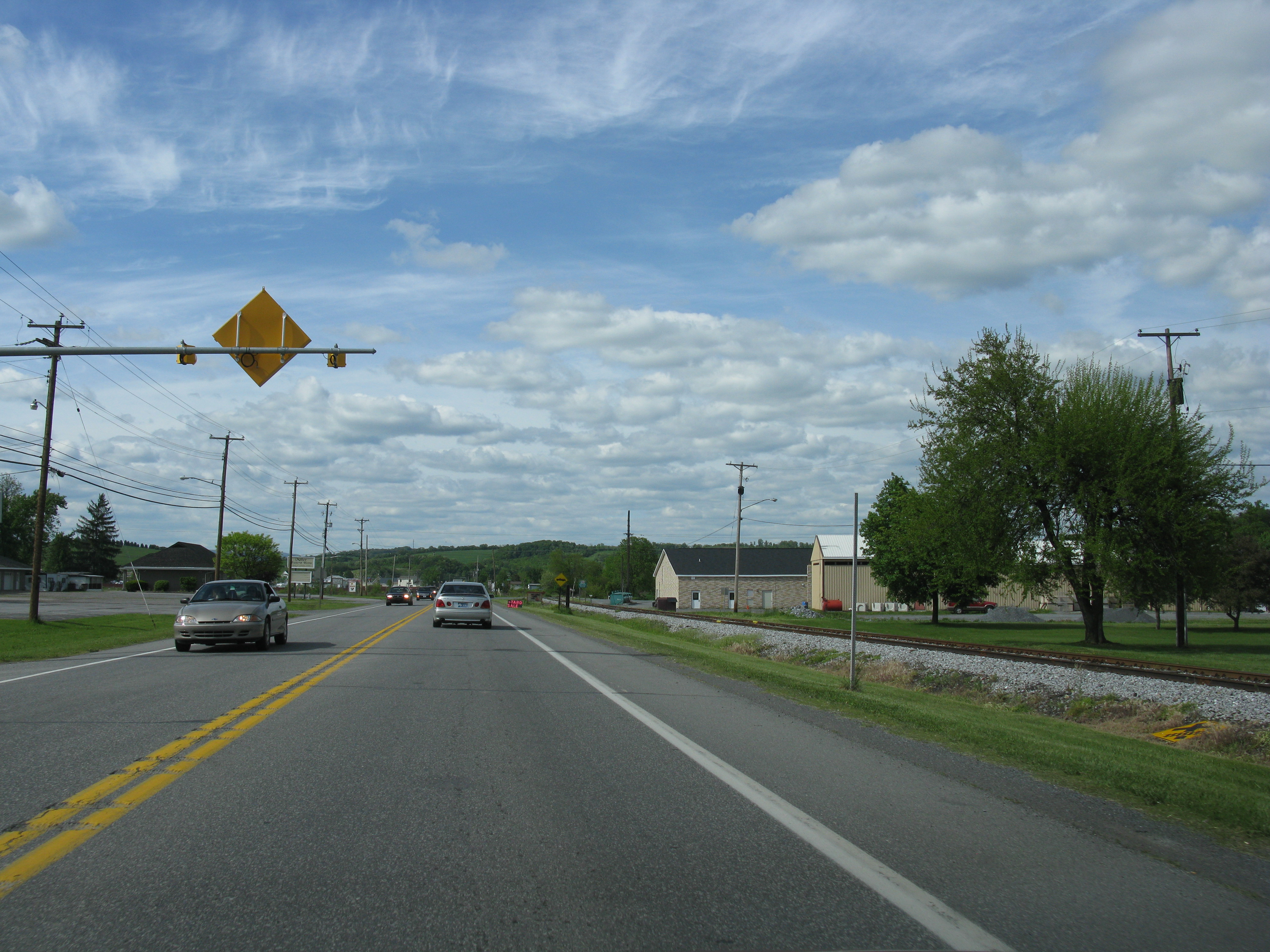
- Along Dunnings Highway (PA 164); the municipal building in on the right in the background

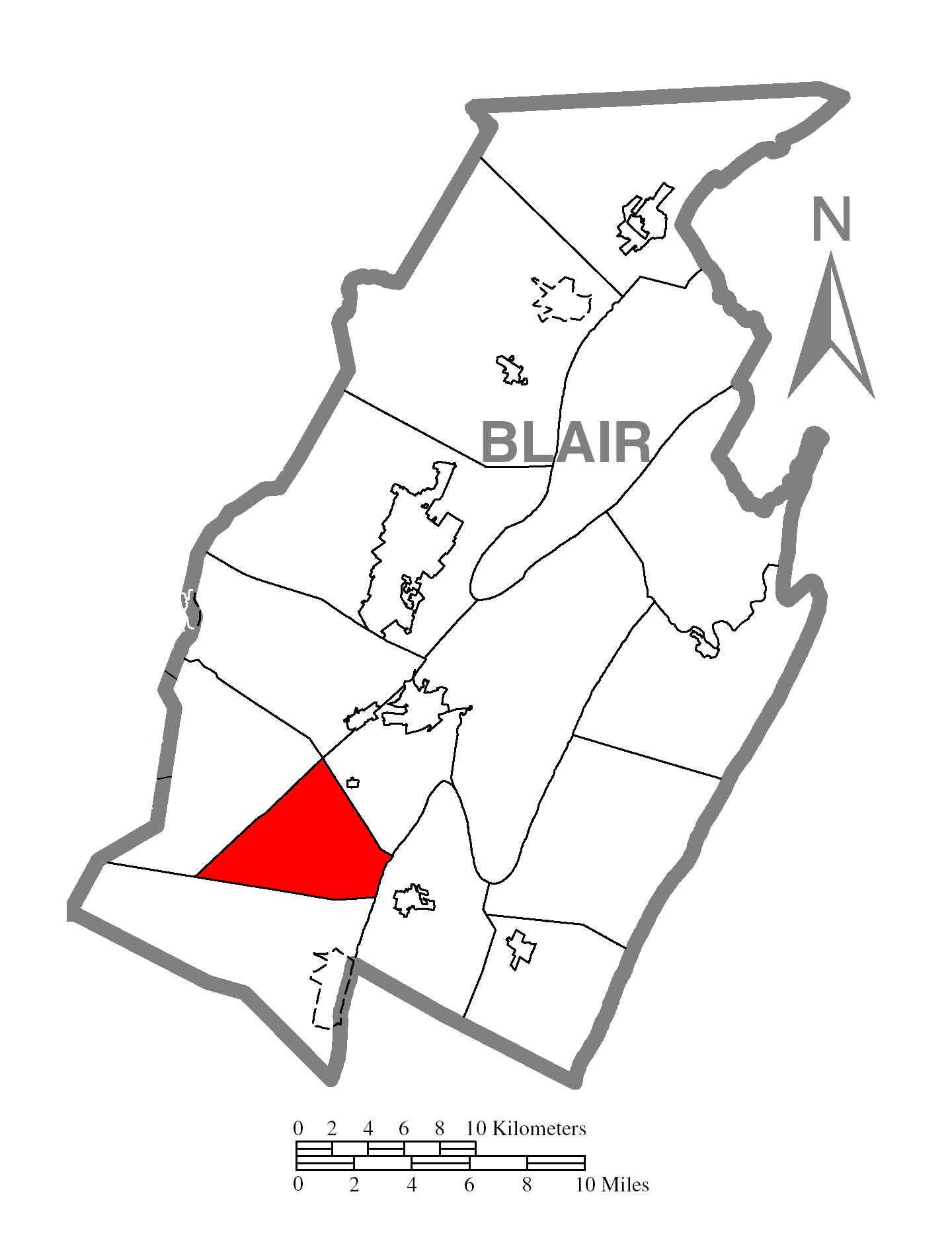
- Map of Blair County, Pennsylvania highlighting Freedom Township

- Map of Blair County, Pennsylvania
- Country: United States
- State: Pennsylvania
- County: Blair
- Settled: 1787
- Incorporated: 1857

Government
  - Type: Board of Supervisors

Area
  - Total: 17.38 sq mi (45.02 km^{2})
  - Land: 17.37 sq mi (45.00 km^{2})
  - Water: 0.0077 sq mi (0.02 km^{2})

Population (2020)
  - Total: 3,005 ▼
  - Estimate (2022): 2,962
  - Density: 195.4/sq mi (75.45/km^{2})
- Time zone: UTC-5 (Eastern (EST))
  - Summer (DST): UTC-4 (EDT)
- Area code: 814
- FIPS code: 42-013-27720

Freedom Township is a township in Blair County, Pennsylvania, United States. It is part of the Altoona, PA Metropolitan Statistical Area. The population was 3,005 at the 2020 census.

== General information ==
- ZIP code: 16637
- Area code: 814
- Local telephone exchanges: 224, 693, 695, 696

== Geography ==
Freedom Township is located in southern Blair County. It is bordered by Blair Township to the northeast, Taylor Township to the southeast, Greenfield Township to the south, Juniata Township to the northwest, and Allegheny Township at Freedom Township's northernmost point. The unincorporated community of East Freedom, a census-designated place, is in the eastern part of the township. Interstate 99 passes through East Freedom, with one exit in the township. Other census-designated places in the township are Leamersville, McKee, Smith Corner, and part of Puzzletown.

According to the United States Census Bureau, the township has a total area of 17.4 square miles (45.0 km^{2}), of which 0.008 square miles (0.02 km^{2}), or 0.04%, is water.

== Demographics ==
Historical population
| Census | Pop. | Note | %± |
|---|---|---|---|
| 2010 | 3,458 | | — |
| 2020 | 3,005 | | −13.1% |
| 2022 (est.) | 2,962 | | −1.4% |
U.S. Decennial Census

As of the census of 2000, there were 3,261 people, 1,259 households, and 958 families residing in the township. The population density was 187.6 inhabitants per square mile (72.4/km^{2}). There were 1,324 housing units at an average density of 76.2 per square mile (29.4/km^{2}). The racial makeup of the township was 98.96% White, 0.21% African American, 0.21% Native American, 0.12% Asian, and 0.49% from two or more races. Hispanic or Latino of any race were 0.09% of the population.

There were 1,259 households, out of which 32.5% had children under the age of 18 living with them, 62.0% were married couples living together, 10.0% had a female householder with no husband present, and 23.9% were non-families. 20.4% of all households were made up of individuals, and 7.6% had someone living alone who was 65 years of age or older. The average household size was 2.59 and the average family size was 2.97.

In the township the population was spread out, with 24.7% under the age of 18, 7.9% from 18 to 24, 30.6% from 25 to 44, 24.8% from 45 to 64, and 12.0% who were 65 years of age or older. The median age was 37 years. For every 100 females, there were 100.4 males. For every 100 females age 18 and over, there were 95.6 males.

The median income for a household in the township was $35,442, and the median income for a family was $38,388. Males had a median income of $30,424 versus $18,229 for females. The per capita income for the township was $14,539. About 4.4% of families and 8.6% of the population were below the poverty line, including 15.2% of those under age 18 and 8.0% of those age 65 or over.
