= Blair Township, Pennsylvania =

Township in Pennsylvania, US

Coordinates: 40°22′10″N 78°24′59″W

- Township
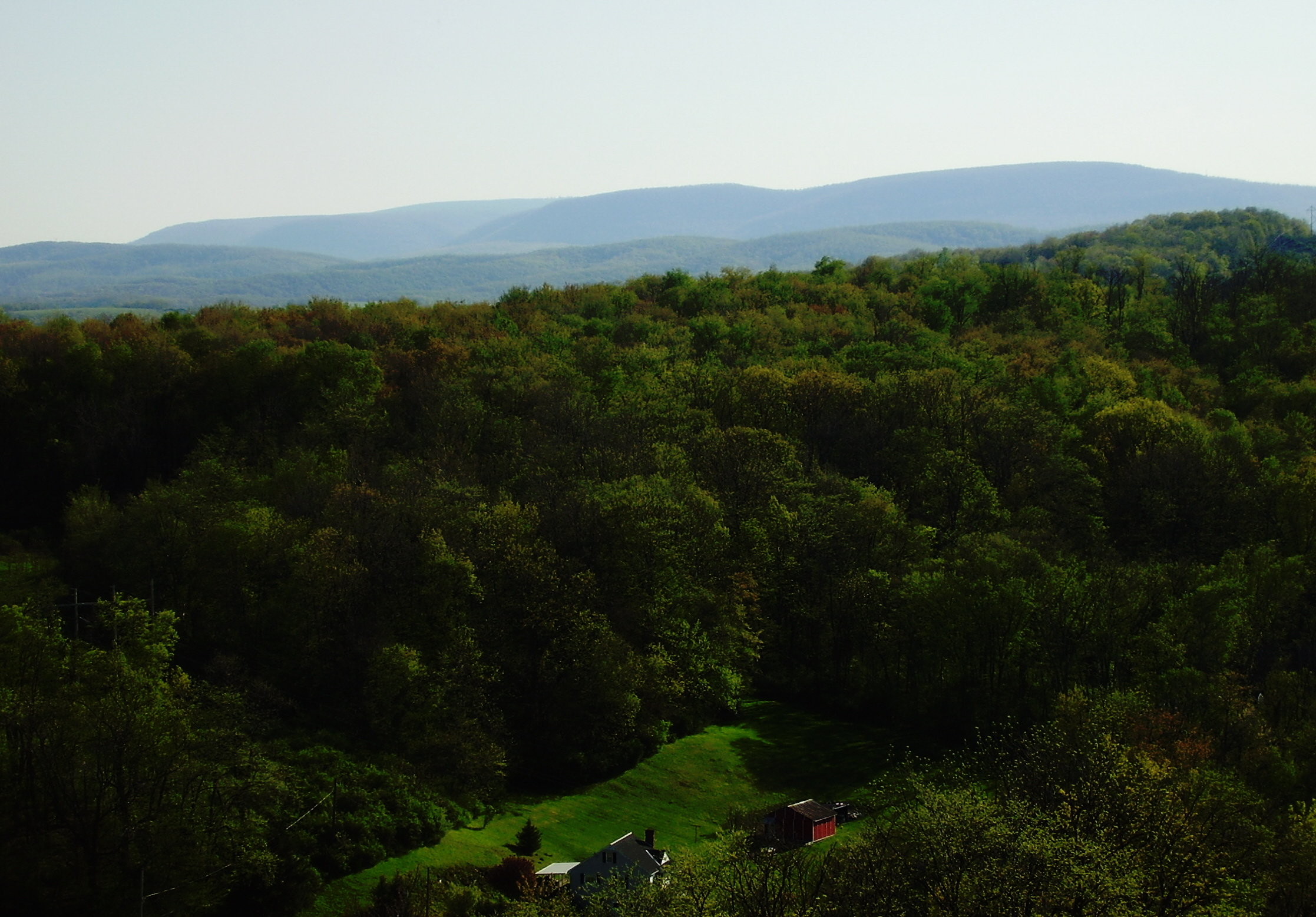
- Looking southwest from Chimney Rocks, immediately south of Hollidaysburg

- Seal
- Motto: A Great Place to Work, a Great Place to Live
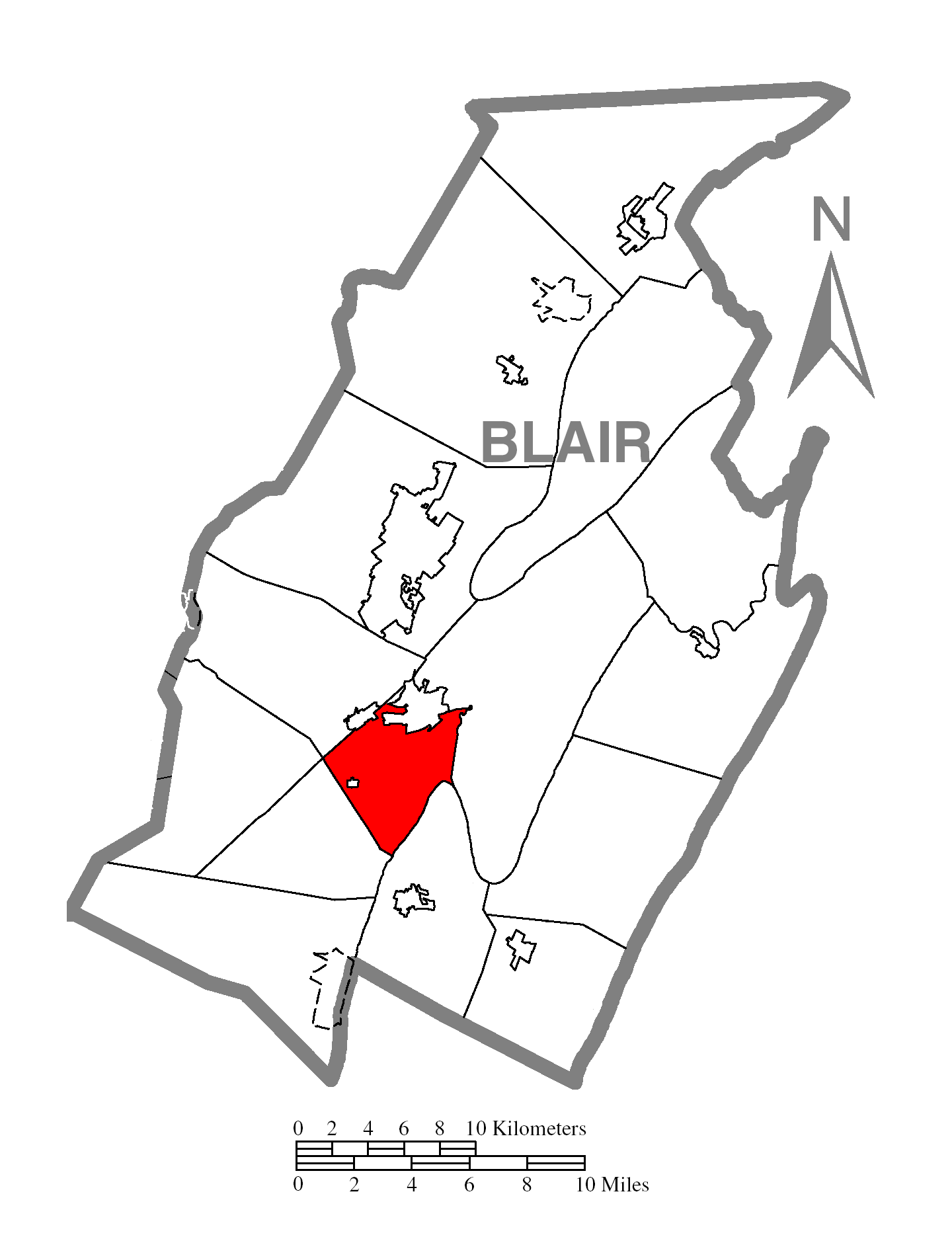
- Map of Blair County, Pennsylvania highlighting Blair Township

- Map of Blair County, Pennsylvania
- Country: United States
- State: Pennsylvania
- County: Blair
- Settled: 1773
- Incorporated: 1839

Government
  - Type: Board of Supervisors

Area
  - Total: 13.70 sq mi (35.48 km^{2})
  - Land: 13.62 sq mi (35.27 km^{2})
  - Water: 0.081 sq mi (0.21 km^{2})

Population (2020)
  - Total: 4,785 ▲
  - Estimate (2022): 4,703
  - Density: 330/sq mi (129/km^{2})
- Time zone: UTC-5 (Eastern (EST))
  - Summer (DST): UTC-4 (EDT)
- Area code: 814
- FIPS code: 42-013-06872
- Website: blairtownship-pa.org

Blair Township is a township in Blair County, Pennsylvania, United States. The population was 4,785 at the 2020 census.

== General information ==
- ZIP codes: 16635, 16648, 16665
- Area code: 814
- Local telephone exchanges: 693, 695, 696

== Geography ==
Blair Township is located in southern Blair County. It is bordered by the boroughs of Hollidaysburg and Duncansville to the north. The township completely surrounds the borough of Newry. Allegheny Township is to the northwest, Frankstown Township is to the northeast, Taylor Township is to the southeast, Freedom Township is to the southwest, and Juniata Township touches the western corner. Unincorporated communities in the township include Fort Fetter, Penn Farms, Reservoir, Brooks Mill, Vicksburg, and parts of McKee (in the south) and Loop (in the northeast).

According to the United States Census Bureau, the township has a total area of 13.7 square miles (35.5 km^{2}), of which 13.6 square miles (35.2 km^{2}) is land and 0.08 square miles (0.2 km^{2}), or 0.60%, is water.

== Demographics ==
Historical population
Census	Pop.	Note	%±
2010	4,494		—
2020	4,792		6.6%
2022 (est.)	4,703		−1.9%
U.S. Decennial Census

As of the census of 2000, there were 4,587 people, 1,775 households, and 1,329 families residing in the township. The population density was 337.3 inhabitants per square mile (130.2/km^{2}). There were 1,846 housing units at an average density of 135.7 per square mile (52.4/km^{2}). The racial makeup of the township was 98.89% White, 0.22% African American, 0.04% Native American, 0.44% Asian, 0.09% from other races, and 0.33% from two or more races. Hispanic or Latino of any race were 0.44% of the population.

There were 1,775 households, out of which 31.4% had children under the age of 18 living with them, 63.0% were married couples living together, 8.5% had a female householder with no husband present, and 25.1% were non-families. 22.0% of all households were made up of individuals, and 9.2% had someone living alone who was 65 years of age or older. The average household size was 2.53 and the average family size was 2.95.

In the township the population was spread out, with 23.0% under the age of 18, 6.2% from 18 to 24, 28.2% from 25 to 44, 27.2% from 45 to 64, and 15.4% who were 65 years of age or older. The median age was 41 years. For every 100 females there were 98.2 males. For every 100 females age 18 and over, there were 92.3 males.

The median income for a household in the township was $44,101, and the median income for a family was $50,662. Males had a median income of $36,768 versus $27,125 for females. The per capita income for the township was $21,764. About 5.4% of families and 6.4% of the population were below the poverty line, including 8.5% of those under age 18 and 7.1% of those age 65 or over.

== Recreation ==
Lions Park is located at the western border of the township in Newry. Pennsylvania State Game Lands Number 147 is located along the eastern border on Dunning Mountain.
