= Puzzletown, Pennsylvania =

Unincorporated community in Pennsylvania, U.S.

Puzzletown (40°22′37″N 78°29′24″W) is an unincorporated community and census-designated place (CDP) in Blair County, Pennsylvania, United States. It straddles the border of Juniata Township and Freedom Township.

== Geography ==
Puzzletown is found at the bottom of a valley which leads up to Blue Knob, the second-highest mountain in the state and part of the Allegheny Front, the eastern edge of the Appalachian Plateau. It is a rural area with a population of three to five hundred at its most liberal definition and less than one hundred at its most restrictive.

Puzzletown is considered by most to be the Puzzletown Road, a road leading to the southwest from Newry, and all of the short side streets and housing developments on it; others extend this for several miles after the road's name becomes Knob Run Road and others limit it to only the intersection of Puzzletown Road and Poplar Run Road and the few nearby side streets.

== History ==
Formerly called Poplar Run, Puzzletown was founded in about 1840.

== Education ==
Part of the CDP is in the Hollidaysburg Area School District while the rest is in the Spring Cove School District.
