= He Lives =

Christian hymn composed by Alfred Henry Ackley

- by Alfred Henry Ackley
- Genre: Hymn
- Written: 1933
- Based on: Luke 24:5
- Meter: 7.6.7.6.7.6.7.4 with refrain

"He Lives" is a Christian hymn, otherwise known by its first line, "I Serve a Risen Savior". It was composed in 1933 by Alfred Henry Ackley (1887–1960), brother of B. D. Ackley, and remains popular in a broad range of Christian denominations and churches.

== History and theme ==
"He Lives" was written by Alfred Henry Ackley in 1933 and first published in 1934 by Rodeheaver Company. Ackley reported that he wrote the hymn in reaction to the question "Why should I worship a dead Jew?" Of the 1,500 hymns that Ackley wrote, "He Lives" is the most popular.

The hymn discusses the experience of Christian believers that Jesus Christ lives within their hearts. A sentiment that reflects the Christian scriptures: “I am crucified with Christ; and it is no longer I who live, but it is Christ who lives in me.”—Galatians 2:20, and “That Christ may make His home in your hearts through faith.”—Ephesians 3:17. The fundamental foundation is the word "faith". As expressed by the hymn, Christian believers, through faith understand knowing Christ as a holy experience given by God, not just a "feeling".

The hymn is disliked by some who believe the song endorses a subjective appeal to experience, which is less reliable than the words of scripture.

== Uses in other media ==
The hymn is sung by church members in Oranges Are Not the Only Fruit, a screen adaptation of Jeanette Winterson's novel of the same name.
