= McKee, Pennsylvania =

Unincorporated community in Pennsylvania, US

- Census-designated place
- Location within Pennsylvania Location within the United States
- Coordinates: 40°21′38″N 78°25′16″W
- Country: United States
- State: Pennsylvania
- County: Blair
- Townships: Freedom; Blair

Area
  - Total: 0.38 sq mi (0.98 km^{2})
  - Land: 0.38 sq mi (0.98 km^{2})
  - Water: 0 sq mi (0.00 km^{2})
- Elevation: 1,034 ft (315 m)

Population (2020)
  - Total: 262
  - Density: 691.3/sq mi (266.91/km^{2})
- Time zone: UTC-5 (Eastern (EST))
  - Summer (DST): UTC-4 (EDT)
- ZIP Codes: 16637 (East Freedom); 16648 (Hollidaysburg)
- Area codes: 814/582
- FIPS code: 42-46240
- GNIS feature ID: 2805522

McKee is an unincorporated community and census-designated place (CDP) in Blair County, Pennsylvania, United States. It was first listed as a CDP prior to the 2020 census.

The CDP is in southern Blair County, in the eastern part of Freedom Township and the southern corner of Blair Township. It sits on both sides of Halter Creek, where the stream exits from a water gap between Short Mountain to the north and Dunning Mountain to the south. Halter Creek is a northwestward-flowing tributary of the Frankstown Branch Juniata River, part of the Susquehanna River watershed.

McKee is bordered to the west by East Freedom. Woodbury Pike, carrying Pennsylvania Routes 36 and 164, passes through the center of McKee, leading northwest 1 mile (1.6 km) to Interstate 99 at Leamersville and southeast through the Halter Creek water gap 2 miles (3 km) to Roaring Spring.

== Demographics ==
Historical population
Census	Pop.	Note	%±
2020	262		—
U.S. Decennial Census

== Education ==
Much of the CDP is in the Spring Cove School District while the rest is in the Hollidaysburg Area School District.
