= Loop, Blair County, Pennsylvania =

Unincorporated community in Pennsylvania, US

Loop, Pennsylvania
- Census-designated place
- Location within Pennsylvania Location within the United States
- Coordinates: 40°25′15″N 78°21′44″W
- Country: United States
- State: Pennsylvania
- County: Blair
- Townships: Frankstown; Blair

Area
  - Total: 1.86 sq mi (4.81 km^{2})
  - Land: 1.82 sq mi (4.72 km^{2})
  - Water: 0.035 sq mi (0.09 km^{2})
- Elevation: 953 ft (290 m)

Population (2020)
  - Total: 1,590
  - Density: 872.8/sq mi (336.98/km^{2})
- Time zone: UTC-5 (Eastern (EST))
  - Summer (DST): UTC-4 (EDT)
- ZIP Code: 16648 (Hollidaysburg)
- Area codes: 814/582
- FIPS code: 42-44632
- GNIS feature ID: 2805520

Loop is an unincorporated community and census-designated place (CDP) in Blair County, Pennsylvania, United States. It was first listed as a CDP prior to the 2020 census.

The CDP is in south-central Blair County, in the western part of Frankstown Township and the east part of Blair Township. It is bordered to the northwest by the borough of Hollidaysburg. The Frankstown Branch of the Juniata River flows northeasterly through the center of the CDP. Loop sits at the base of the northern end of Loop Mountain, part of the Ridge-and-Valley Province of the Appalachian Mountains.

== Demographics ==
Historical population
| Census | Pop. | Note | %± |
|---|---|---|---|
| 2020 | 1,590 | | — |
U.S. Decennial Census

== Education ==
The school district is Hollidaysburg Area School District.
