= Juniata Township, Blair County, Pennsylvania =

Township in Pennsylvania, US

Coordinates: 40°24′32″N 78°31′08″W

- Township
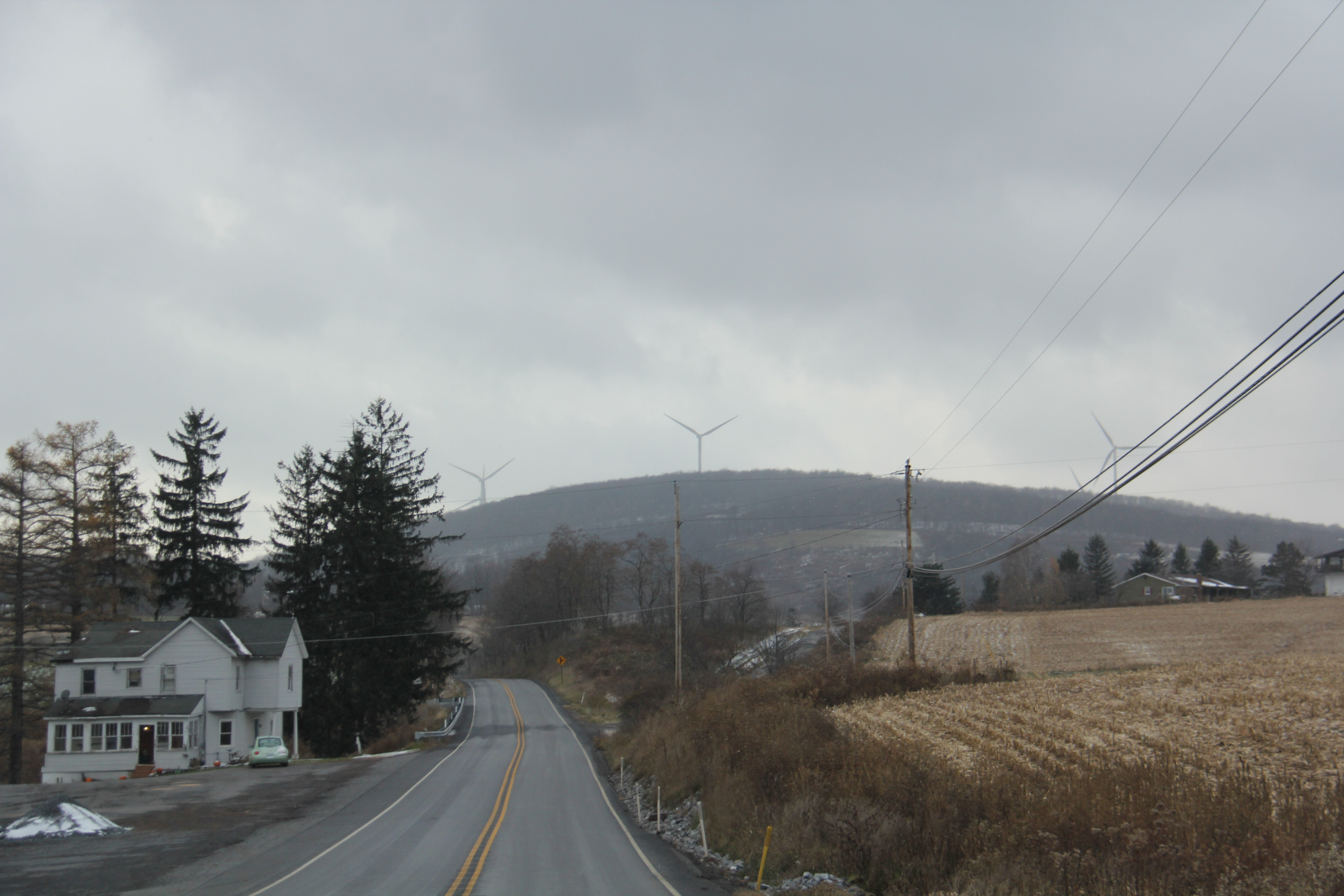
- PA 164 westbound in the Juniata Township village of Blue Knob

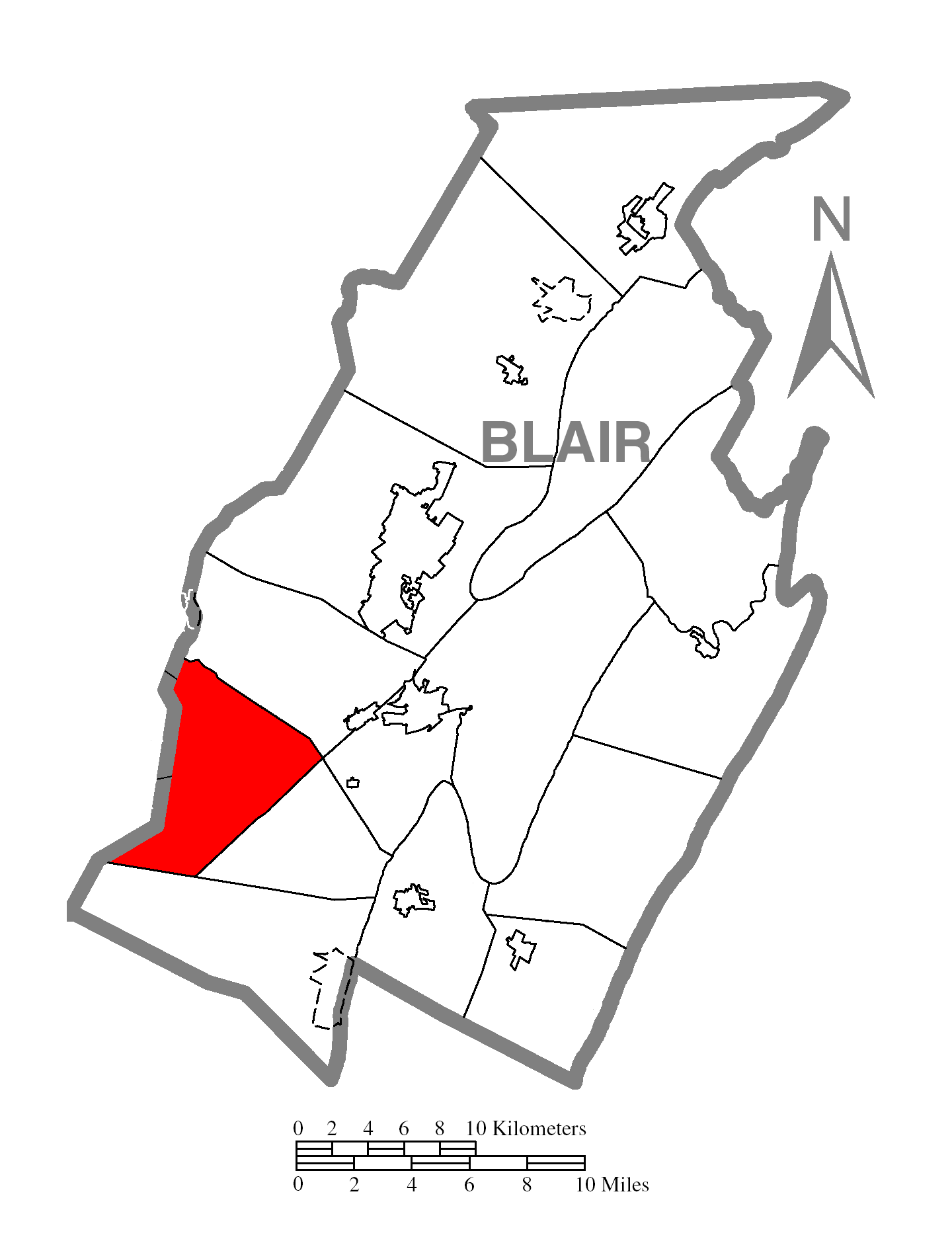
- Map of Blair County, Pennsylvania highlighting Juniata Township

- Map of Blair County, Pennsylvania
- Country: United States
- State: Pennsylvania
- County: Blair
- Settled: 1800
- Incorporated: 1847

Government
  - Type: Board of Supervisors

Area
  - Total: 26.13 sq mi (67.67 km^{2})
  - Land: 26.07 sq mi (67.52 km^{2})
  - Water: 0.054 sq mi (0.14 km^{2})

Population (2020)
  - Total: 965 ▼
  - Estimate (2022): 945
  - Density: 42.2/sq mi (16.28/km^{2})
- Time zone: UTC-5 (Eastern (EST))
  - Summer (DST): UTC-4 (EDT)
- Area code: 814
- FIPS code: 42-013-38592

Juniata Township is a township in Blair County, Pennsylvania, United States. It is part of the Altoona, PA Metropolitan Statistical Area. The population was 965 at the 2020 census.

== Geography ==
Juniata Township is located in southwestern Blair County, along the Cambria County line. It lies along the Allegheny Front, a major escarpment along the edge of the Allegheny Mountains in central Pennsylvania. The former alignment of U.S. Route 22 climbs the Front in the northern part of the township, though the current limited-access routing of US-22 runs farther to the north.

The township includes the census-designated place of Blue Knob, plus parts of the CDPs of Puzzletown and Foot of Ten.

According to the United States Census Bureau, the township has a total area of 26.1 square miles (67.7 km^{2}), of which 26.1 square miles (67.5 km^{2}) is land and 0.04 square miles (0.1 km^{2}), or 0.21%, is water.

== Demographics ==
Historical population
Census	Pop.	Note	%±
2010	1,112		—
2020	965		−13.2%
2022 (est.)	945		−2.1%
U.S. Decennial Census

As of the census of 2000, there were 1,115 people, 428 households, and 324 families residing in the township. The population density was 41.9 inhabitants per square mile (16.2/km^{2}). There were 471 housing units at an average density of 17.7/sq mi (6.8/km^{2}). The racial makeup of the township was 99.46% White, 0.09% African American, 0.09% Asian, 0.18% from other races, and 0.18% from two or more races. Hispanic or Latino of any race were 0.09% of the population.

There were 428 households, out of which 35.7% had children under the age of 18 living with them, 64.3% were married couples living together, 7.5% had a female householder with no husband present, and 24.1% were non-families. 21.3% of all households were made up of individuals, and 7.2% had someone living alone who was 65 years of age or older. The average household size was 2.61 and the average family size was 3.02.

In the township the population was spread out, with 24.0% under the age of 18, 8.7% from 18 to 24, 29.4% from 25 to 44, 25.8% from 45 to 64, and 12.0% who were 65 years of age or older. The median age was 37 years. For every 100 females, there were 108.8 males. For every 100 females age 18 and over, there were 106.6 males.

The median income for a household in the township was $36,944, and the median income for a family was $39,375. Males had a median income of $30,921 versus $20,278 for females. The per capita income for the township was $15,277. About 8.3% of families and 9.3% of the population were below the poverty line, including 14.6% of those under age 18 and 6.7% of those age 65 or over.
