= Portage, Pennsylvania =

Borough in Pennsylvania, US

- Borough
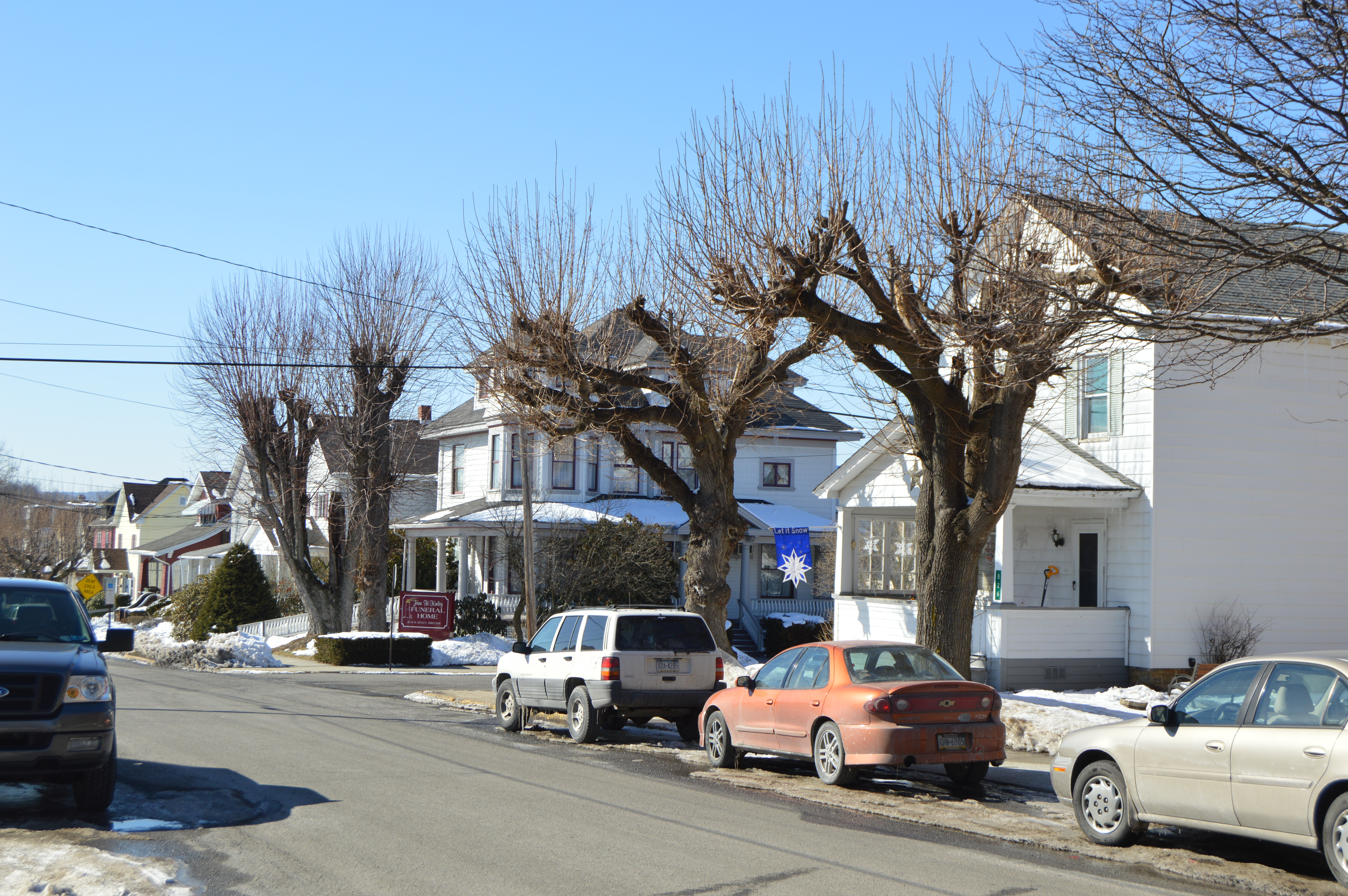
- Houses on Gillespie Avenue

- Location of Portage in Cambria County, Pennsylvania.

- Location of Pennsylvania in the United States
- Coordinates: 40°23′13″N 78°40′25″W
- Country: United States
- State: Pennsylvania
- County: Cambria
- Incorporated: 1890
- Named for: to portage, or to carry a boat or cargo across land between navigable waters

Area
  - Total: 0.66 sq mi (1.72 km^{2})
  - Land: 0.66 sq mi (1.72 km^{2})
  - Water: 0 sq mi (0.00 km^{2})
- Elevation: 1,686 ft (514 m)

Population (2020)
  - Total: 2,459
  - Density: 3,694.0/sq mi (1,426.26/km^{2})
- Time zone: UTC-5 (EST)
  - Summer (DST): UTC-4 (EDT)
- ZIP code: 15946
- Area code: 814
- FIPS code: 42-62048
- GNIS feature ID: 1215031
- Website: portageboro.com

Portage is a borough with home rule status in Cambria County, Pennsylvania, United States. It is 10 miles (16 km) southeast of Ebensburg and 22 miles (35 km) southwest of Altoona. It is part of the Johnstown, Pennsylvania Metropolitan Statistical Area. The population was 2,388 at the 2023 US census.

== History ==
The history of Portage as a community began with the building and opening of the Allegheny-Portage Railroad (APRR) in 1834. Due to its location on the APRR, Portage was originally called “Foot of Two” as it was the located at the bottom of Inclined Plane No. 2. The APRR would build their headquarters a few hundred feet west of the foot (bottom) of Plane No. 2. The headquarters consisted of offices and a shop complex. Also near the foot of the incline was the Washington House Hotel that served as a place to stay for travelers.

“Foot of Two” was eventually renamed “Portage.” The definition of portage is: carrying boats, goods, etc., overland from one body of water to another

Today, Pennsylvania Route 53 follows the route of the APRR through Portage. With advancements in locomotive technology, Inclined Plane No. 2 was bypassed in 1852.

By 1854, the Allegheny Portage Railroad was considered obsolete due to the Pennsylvania Railroad which traveled over the Alleghenys considerably faster and safer. At the same time, another company, the New Portage Railroad, was attempting to do the same, but in 1857, the Pennsylvania Railroad bought the New Portage railroad and abandoned it.

Within a few years after the opening of the Pennsylvania Railroad, a facility was constructed for locomotives to stop to take on water and pick up wood to fire the boiler. With the abundance of lumber and coal in Portage, many companies were formed to deforest and mine in the area. As a result of the new industries, a population boom occurred, and by the 1860s, a passenger station was built by the railroad along the mainline, which at the time traveled through the center of town on what is now the Sonman Branch Line.

Portage Township was cut from Washington and Summerhill Townships on March 4, 1878. On October 7, 1890, the borough of Portage was incorporated and cut from Portage Township.

In the 1890s, the Pennsylvania Railroad was re-aligned from Lilly to Summerhill, changing the landscape of Portage and a new railroad station was built on Washington Avenue. The town continued to grow in size into the 1920s when it reached its peak population of 4,804 at the time of the 1920 United States census. The Washington Avenue PRR station remained open until 1926 when a new station was built on Lee Street.

On July 15, 1940, what is known today as the Sonman Mine Explosion occurred at the Sonman Shaft Coal Co. near Portage. A total of 63 miners would perish when a methane gas explosion occurred. In 1960, a memorial to the miners who died in the explosion was dedicated in the Jamestown section of Portage. It was later relocated to Crichton-McCormick Park in Portage. The Portage Station Museum offers a documentary about the disaster titled "63 Men Down: The Story of the Sonman Mine Explosion." The museum also offers exhibits on coal mining and railroading in the area.

On November 17, 1953, the Pennsylvania Railroad ended passenger service to Portage. The station would remain open into 1954 as a stop for the Railway Express Agency, but would close that year. The population in Portage Borough would stay steady, around 4,000, until the late 1970s. Since then, a steep drop in population would occur due to the closure of many of the coal mines in the region and much of the steel industry slowing in nearby Johnstown, as a result of the 1977 Johnstown Flood and imports of steel from foreign countries.

To celebrate the town's centennial, a town festival, known as "Summerfest", was organized. It has since been celebrated every year on the second weekend of August. The festival has many traditions including ethnic foods and a mass service on Sunday morning of that weekend. Another annual event held every year is the annual community yard sale, organized by the Portage Area Historical Society. It is held on the second Saturday in June.

The Portage Historic District was listed on the National Register of Historic Places in 1995.

Portage adopted a home rule charter on May 10, 1994, that took effect on January 1, 1996. Although the community kept "Borough of Portage" as its official name, it is no longer governed under the state's Borough Code.

== Fire company ==
The Portage Volunteer Fire Company was chartered in 1906. At this time, it was a one-bay-door barn with a horse-drawn engine. In 1936, the company updated their fleet with a new American LaFrance engine. They were one of the first companies to have purchased a fire engine, and they began to run mutual aid to other departments. Many years later, they got more apparatus, and realized the single garage building was too small, so in 1977, they constructed the municipal building/fire station that also houses the Portage Boro Police Department. In 2009, the Cassandra Volunteer Fire Company and Portage Volunteer Fire Company merged to better serve the community and eliminate duplication of services in the area. In 2015, members from the Wilmore Volunteer Fire Company and Portage Volunteer Fire Company accepted a merger to better serve their communities. As of 2015, the Portage Volunteer Fire Company operates out of two stations and has a fleet of one 75-foot (23 m) Quint, one rescue engine, one engine, one tanker, one ATV/brush unit, and two support vehicles.

== Notable person ==
- Len Chappell, professional basketball player

== Geography ==
Portage is located in southeastern Cambria County at 40°23′13″N 78°40′25″W (40.386858, -78.673593), in the valley of the Little Conemaugh River.

According to the United States Census Bureau, the borough has a total area of 0.66 square miles (1.7 km^{2}), all land.

== Demographics ==
Historical population
Census	Pop.	Note	%±
1880	274		—
1890	564		105.8%
1900	816		44.7%
1910	2,954		262.0%
1920	4,804		62.6%
1930	4,432		−7.7%
1940	4,123		−7.0%
1950	4,371		6.0%
1960	3,933		−10.0%
1970	4,151		5.5%
1980	3,510		−15.4%
1990	3,105		−11.5%
2000	2,837		−8.6%
2010	2,638		−7.0%
2020	2,459		−6.8%

As of the census of 2000, there were 2,837 people, 1,232 households, and 756 families residing in the borough. The population density was 4,262.7 inhabitants per square mile (1,645.8/km^{2}). There were 1,367 housing units at an average density of 2,054.0 per square mile (793.1/km^{2}). The racial makeup of the borough was 99.47% White, 0.07% African American, 0.04% Native American, 0.07% Asian, 0.04% from other races, and 0.32% from two or more races. Hispanic or Latino of any race were 0.49% of the population. Residents are predominantly of Polish or Slovak descent.

There were 1,232 households, out of which 24.8% had children under the age of 18 living with them, 45.5% were married couples living together, 11.4% had a female householder with no husband present, and 38.6% were non-families. 35.1% of all households were made up of individuals, and 18.9% had someone living alone who was 65 years of age or older. The average household size was 2.27 and the average family size was 2.95.

In the borough the population was spread out, with 20.7% under the age of 18, 8.7% from 18 to 24, 25.4% from 25 to 44, 23.7% from 45 to 64, and 21.6% who were 65 years of age or older. The median age was 42 years. For every 100 females, there were 86.9 males. For every 100 females age 18 and over, there were 82.3 males.

The median income for a household in the borough was $24,548, and the median income for a family was $34,539. Males had a median income of $24,957 versus $21,500 for females. The per capita income for the borough was $15,594. About 14.0% of families and 18.3% of the population were below the poverty line, including 22.9% of those under age 18 and 5.5% of those age 65 or over.

== Bibliography ==
- "The Story of Portage." Johnstown Tribune, 21 June 1906. Print.
- "How Towns Were Named." Nanty-Glo Journal, 8 Feb. 1956. Print.
