= East Freedom, Pennsylvania =

Unincorporated community in Pennsylvania, US

- Census-designated place
- Interactive map of East Freedom, Pennsylvania
- Coordinates: 40°21′19″N 78°25′50″W
- Country: United States
- State: Pennsylvania
- County: Blair
- Township: Freedom

Area
  - Total: 0.49 sq mi (1.28 km^{2})
  - Land: 0.49 sq mi (1.28 km^{2})
  - Water: 0 sq mi (0.00 km^{2})
- Elevation: 1,017 ft (310 m)

Population (2020)
  - Total: 552
  - Density: 1,115.2/sq mi (430.59/km^{2})
- Time zone: UTC-5 (Eastern (EST))
  - Summer (DST): UTC-4 (EDT)
- ZIP codes: 16637
- FIPS code: 42-21176
- GNIS feature ID: 2631260

East Freedom is a census-designated place (CDP) in Freedom Township, Blair County, Pennsylvania, United States. It is located near I-99 and is approximately four miles to the west of the borough of Roaring Spring. As of the 2010 census, the population was 972 residents.

== Demographics ==
Historical population
Census	Pop.	Note	%±
2020	552		—
U.S. Decennial Census

== Education ==
It is in the Spring Cove School District.
