= Ore Hill =

Ore Hill may refer to:

- Ore Hill, Pennsylvania
- Ore Hill (restaurant)
