= Altoona Area High School =

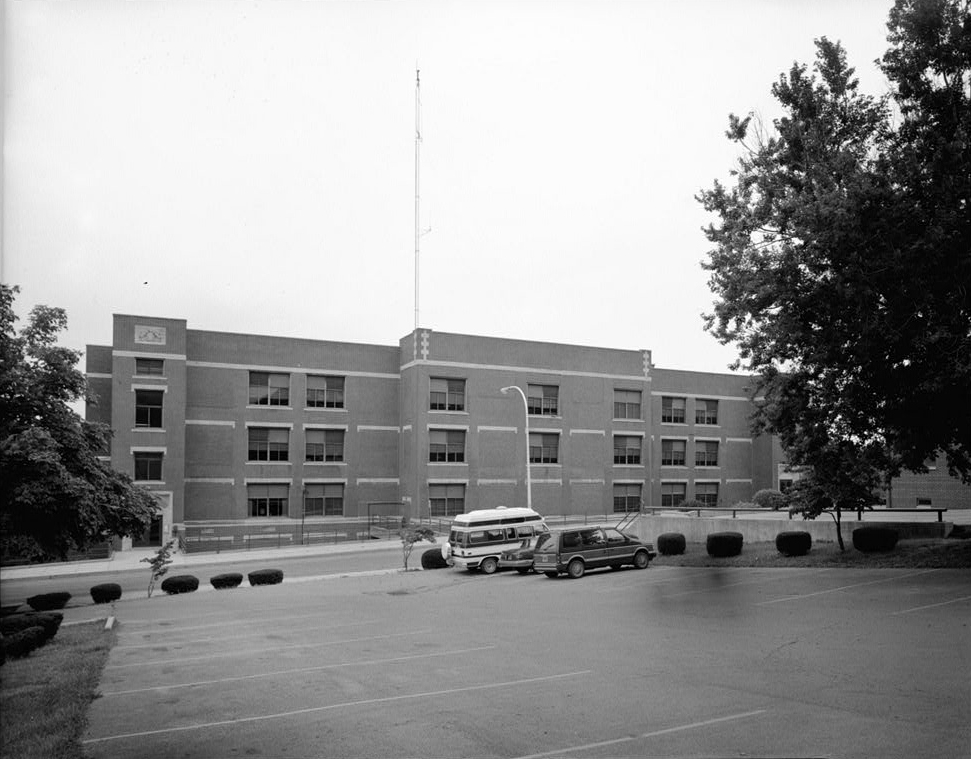
- Altoona Area High School, 1989

Location
- 1415 Sixth Avenue; Altoona, Pennsylvania 16602; United States; 40.50998°N 78.39787°W

Information
- School type: Public school (government funded), High School
- Established: 1895
- School district: Altoona Area School District
- NCES District ID: 4202340
- NCES School ID: 420234000913
- Principal: Andrew Neely
- Teaching staff: 139.51 (on an FTE basis)
- Grades: 9-12
- Enrollment: 2,246 (2023–2024)
- Student to teacher ratio: 16.10
- Colors: Maroon and white
- Mascot: Mountain lion
- Website: http://aahs.aasdcat.com

Altoona Area High School (AAHS) is the public high school for the Altoona Area School District in Altoona, Pennsylvania. The high school serves the communities of Altoona, Logan Township, and a small portion of Tyrone Township.

The school district is the eighteenth largest in the state, and the high school is one of the largest and best known in the state. Altoona Area High School (AAHS) teaches grades 9 through 12.

== History ==
The first six official graduates of Altoona Area High School graduated in 1877.

A riot occurred at the school in 1907 after boys in the senior class attempted to disrupt a junior class social. A large fight ensued and several students were injured after students threw stones and fired revolvers.

Another riot occurred at the school in 1910 after 25 senior students—on their last day of school—marched into the school's chapel service with their faces smeared. A large fight resulted, leading to the arrest of two students and suspension of 25 others.

In 1943, Altoona High became the only high school in the United States to have a World War II veteran as its class president. Robert G. Pennington, 18, had enlisted in 1942, and served four months in the Marine Corps before obtaining a medical discharge. He then returned to school.

Country music star and gay rights activist Chely Wright attended the school's 1998 prom, after accepting a request from student Dave Showalter that she be his date.

In 2002, school officials permitted an undercover female police officer to pose as a student for three months in order to identify drug transactions at the school. Five students were charged with drug violations.

=== Facility ===
The school was first located at the Webster Building, then became established in a separate building until 1895. In 1905, it moved to its present location on sixth avenue. This building cost $250,000. After the First World War, the building was not large enough to house the number of students it had enrolled. In 1927, a $1 million annex was added to accompany the facilities. A $14 million project during the 1970s allowed the school to be completely renovated and a 1200-seat auditorium was built. A new gym, called the fieldhouse, was also constructed. In 1995, the Women's Basketball Coaches Association High School All-America game was telecast live from the fieldhouse by ESPN2.

=== Building features ===
The school itself consists of two buildings (A and B) which contain a planetarium, full size gym, television studio, auxiliary gym, electronic learning laboratory, and regulation size swimming pool. An $88 million renovation of building A and a new B building was constructed across sixth avenue on the site of a former intramural playing field and running track. The new Building B is connected to Building A by a pedestrian bridge over Sixth Avenue. The new building opened in fall of 2021. The Vocational Technology Center is located adjacent to the high school.

== Attendance boundary ==
The district (of which this is the sole comprehensive high school) includes all of Altoona and Logan Township, and a small portion of Tyrone Township. It includes the census-designated places of East Altoona, Elberta, Eldorado, Juniata Gap, Mill Run, Newburg, Red Hill, Sickles Corner, and Wopsononock. It also includes most of each of the following CDPs: Greenwood and Lakemont.

== Students and teachers ==
Ethnicity
Ethnicity	Altoona Area High School (2021–22)	State average
Caucasian	86%	76%
African American	9.7%	16%
Hispanic	2.1%	6%
Asian	<1%	2%

Miscellaneous
Category	Altoona Area High School	State average
Students eligible for free or reduced lunch	45%	33%
Student to teacher ratio	16.49:1	~17:1

- Number of students- 2224
  - Ninth grade- 630
  - Tenth grade- 575
  - Eleventh grade- 494
  - Twelfth grade- 525
- Number of teachers- 134.91 (on an FTE basis)

== William P. Kimmel Alternative School ==
The District offers this school for students who are not successful or are disruptive in the traditional public school setting. The school focuses on dropout prevention, improving student's reading and math skills and assisting the student to successfully graduate. The school was named for a former school board president.

== Extracurriculars ==
The district offers a variety of clubs, activities and an extensive sports program. The district owns three fields with artificial turfs enhance physical education, intramural and interscholastic athletic opportunities.

=== Athletics ===
There are numerous sports and athletic programs available to the students at Altoona Area High School including an Intramural sports program. The Football and Track and Field teams compete at historic Mansion Park, which recently underwent field replacement. The District also operates the Sheetz Athletic Training Center a 3600 square-foot facility opened in August, 2009.

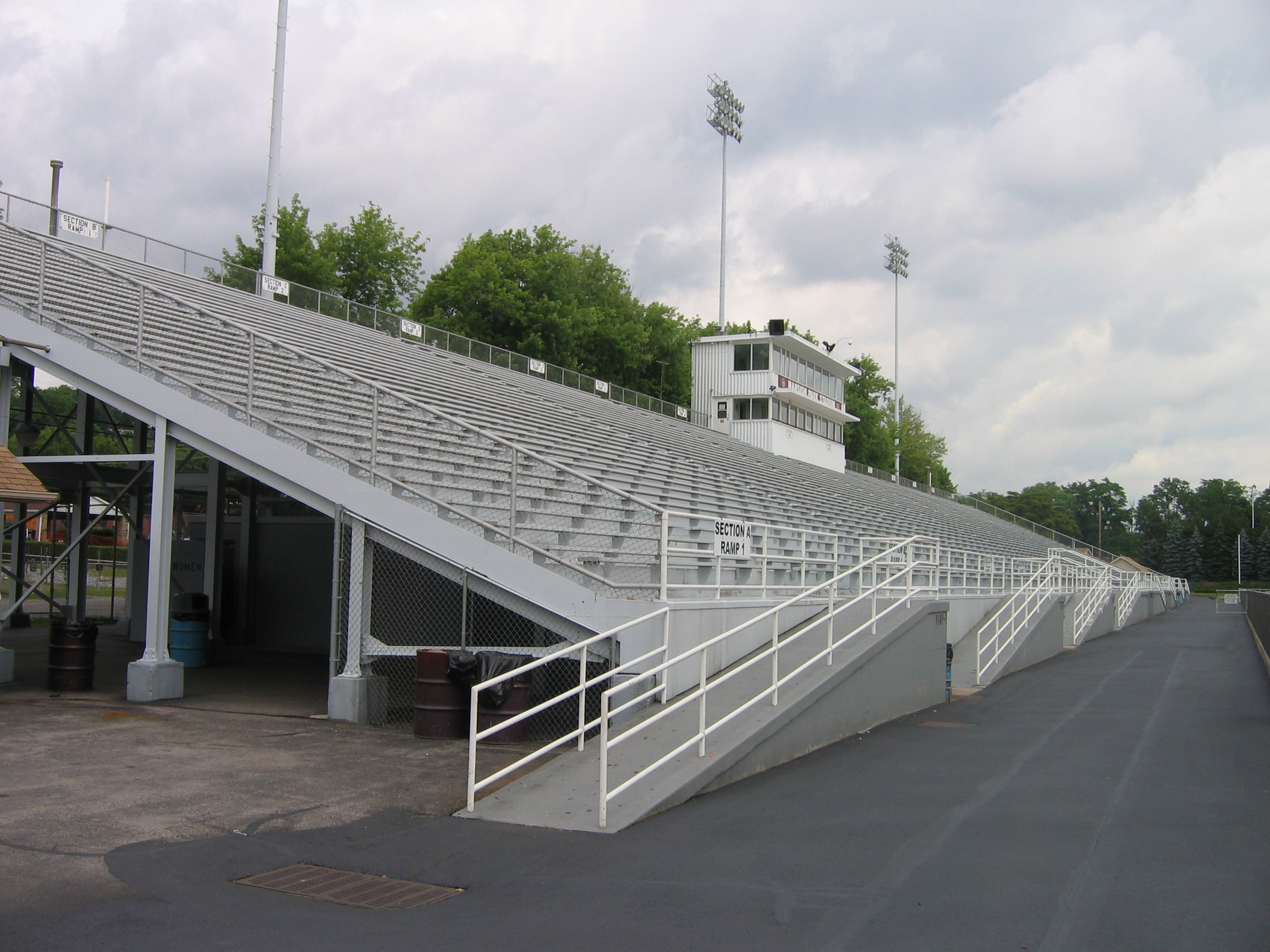
Mansion Park home side, summer 2007

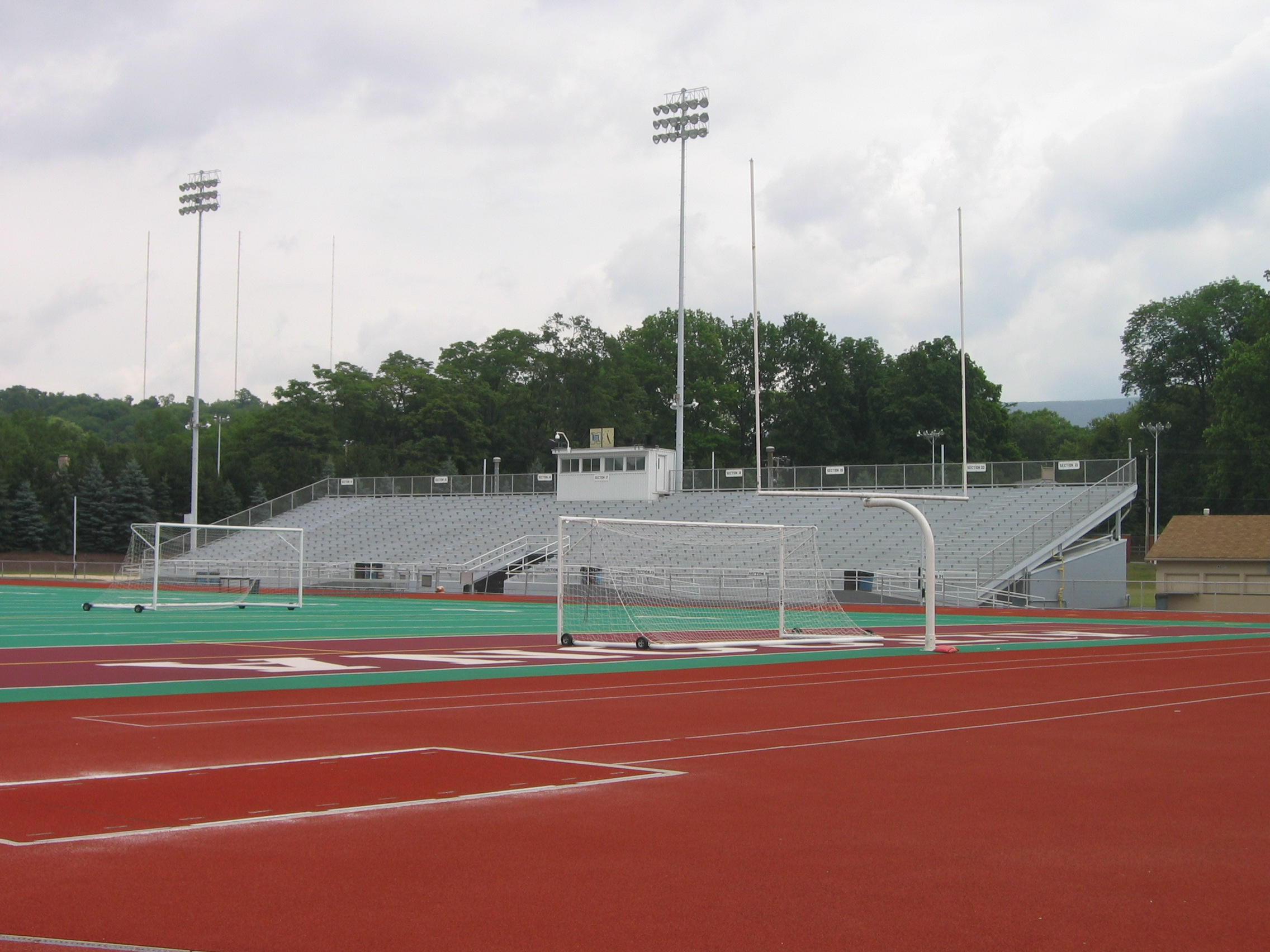
Mansion Park visitor side, summer 2007

==== Male sports ====
Baseball, Basketball, Cross Country, Football, Golf, Soccer, Swimming, Tennis, Track and Field, Volleyball, Winter Track, and Wrestling

==== Female sports ====
Basketball, Cheerleading, Cross Country, Golf, Gymnastics, Soccer, Softball, Swimming, Tennis, Track and Field, Volleyball, and Winter Track.

==== State champions ====
The following Altoona High School teams won PIAA state championships in their respective sports.

- 1939 Boys' Cross Country
- 1941 Boys' Cross Country (tied with Mt. Lebanon)
- 1951 Boys' Cross Country
- 1954 Boys' Cross Country
- 1982 Girls' Cross Country
- 1983 Girls' Cross Country
- 1986 Girls' Basketball
- 1988 Girls' Basketball
- 1988 Girls' Cross Country
- 1995 Girls' Basketball
- 2008 Boys' Outdoor Track & Field
- 2009 Boys' Indoor Track & Field
- 2010 Boys' Indoor Track & Field
- 2010 Boys' Outdoor Track & Field

== Notable alumni ==
- Brad Benson, former professional football player, New York Giants
- Rob Boston, author, advocate of church-state separation
- Blaine Earon, former professional football player, Detroit Lions
- Danny Fortson, former professional basketball player
- Richard Geist, former Pennsylvania House of Representatives member
- Kevin Givens, professional football player, San Francisco 49ers
- Mike Iuzzolino, former professional basketball player
- Betty James, businesswoman, wife of Slinky inventor Richard T. James
- Eli Mencer, former professional football player, Seattle Seahawks
- Johnny Moore (basketball), professional basketball player for the San Antonio Spurs. Retired #00
- Maury Patt, deceased professional football player
- Mike Reid, songwriter, football player, Grammy Award winner
- Louis Schmitt Jr. (b. 1962), former Member of the Pennsylvania House or Representatives (2018-2025) and current Judge of the Court of Common Pleas for the 24th Judicial District (Blair County, Pennsylvania).
- Doug West, former professional basketball player, Minnesota Timberwolves and Vancouver Grizzlies
- Paul Winter musician, Grammy award nominee
- Alfie Wise, actor
