= John McGraw (brigadier general) =

United States Air Force general

John Robert McGraw
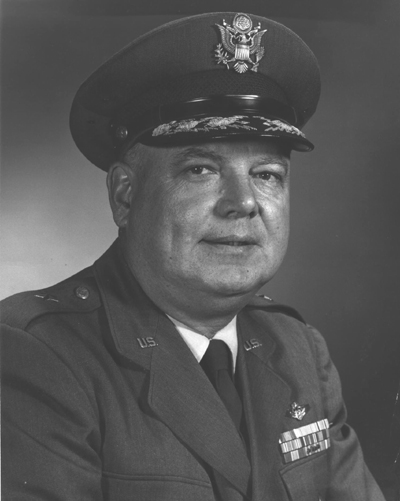
- Gen. John R. McGraw M.D. CA. 1961
- Born: January 4, 1912; Lakemont, Pennsylvania
- Died: June 19, 1976 (aged 64); Miami, Florida
- Military career
- Allegiance: United States of America
- Branch: United States Air Force
- Service years: 1937–1963
- Rank: Brigadier General
- Conflicts: World War II
- Awards: Commendation Medal

John Robert McGraw (January 4, 1912 – June 19, 1976) was a Brigadier general (United States) in the United States Air Force, who served as flight surgeon during World War II.

== Biography ==
He was born in Lakemont, Blair County, Pennsylvania, in 1912, to Howard and Emma McGraw. He graduated as salutatorian from Johnstown Senior High School and went on to graduate from the University of Pittsburgh School of Medicine in 1934 as a doctor of medicine.

Dr. McGraw worked in private practice from 1935 to 1936 in Pennsylvania as a general practitioner and surgeon. In 1937, on his 25th birthday, he entered military service as a first lieutenant in the U.S. Army. By 1942, within five years of joining the army, first lieutenant McGraw had advanced to the rank of colonel. In 1944 Colonel McGraw was reassigned to the position of Assistant Commandant of the AAF School of Aviation Medicine at Randolph Field (San Antonio) Texas.

In 1945 Colonel McGraw served in the European Theater of Operations. He then served as a surgeon in the Thirteenth Air Force in the Pacific Theater. After World War II, Colonel McGraw returned to the School of Aviation Medicine at Randolph Field and served as the deputy commandant, and later as commandant.

In 1956 Colonel McGraw served as surgeon at the Headquarters Twelfth Air Force in Ramstein, Germany, and in 1958, he transferred to Wheelus Air Base in Tripoli, Libya. In 1961 Colonel McGraw was reassigned to Offutt Air Force Base in Omaha, Nebraska, where he was promoted to the rank of brigadier general.

Upon retirement from the Air Force, General McGraw moved to Miami, Florida, where he became the medical director for Eastern Air Lines. He died in Miami, Florida, in June 1976.
