= List of Phi Kappa Psi chapters =

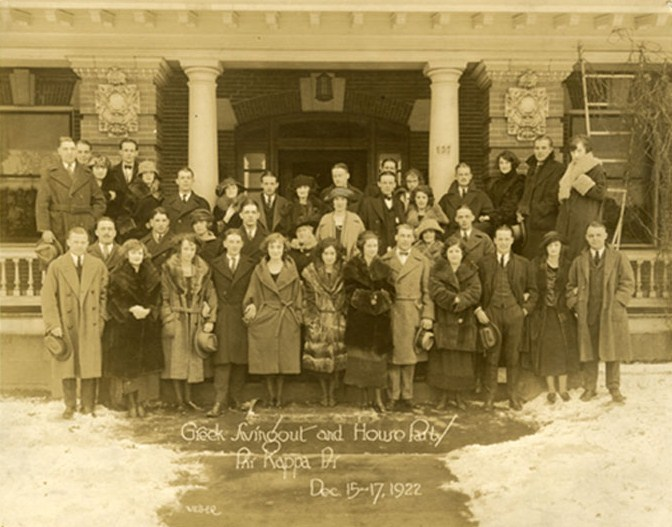
Party-goers pose in front of the Phi Kappa Psi Fraternity house during the 1922 Greek Swingout weekend, at Washington & Jefferson College

Phi Kappa Psi, also called "Phi Psi," is an American collegiate social fraternity founded at Jefferson College in Canonsburg, Pennsylvania on February 19, 1852. More than 140,000 men have been initiated into Phi Kappa Psi since its founding.

When Phi Kappa Psi is extending to an institution that does not currently have a chapter, a probationary group called a "colony" is formed. After the criteria are met, that colony receives its charter and becomes a chapter. A chapter becomes inactive when it relinquishes its charter, or the charter is revoked by the fraternity.

== Chapter naming convention ==
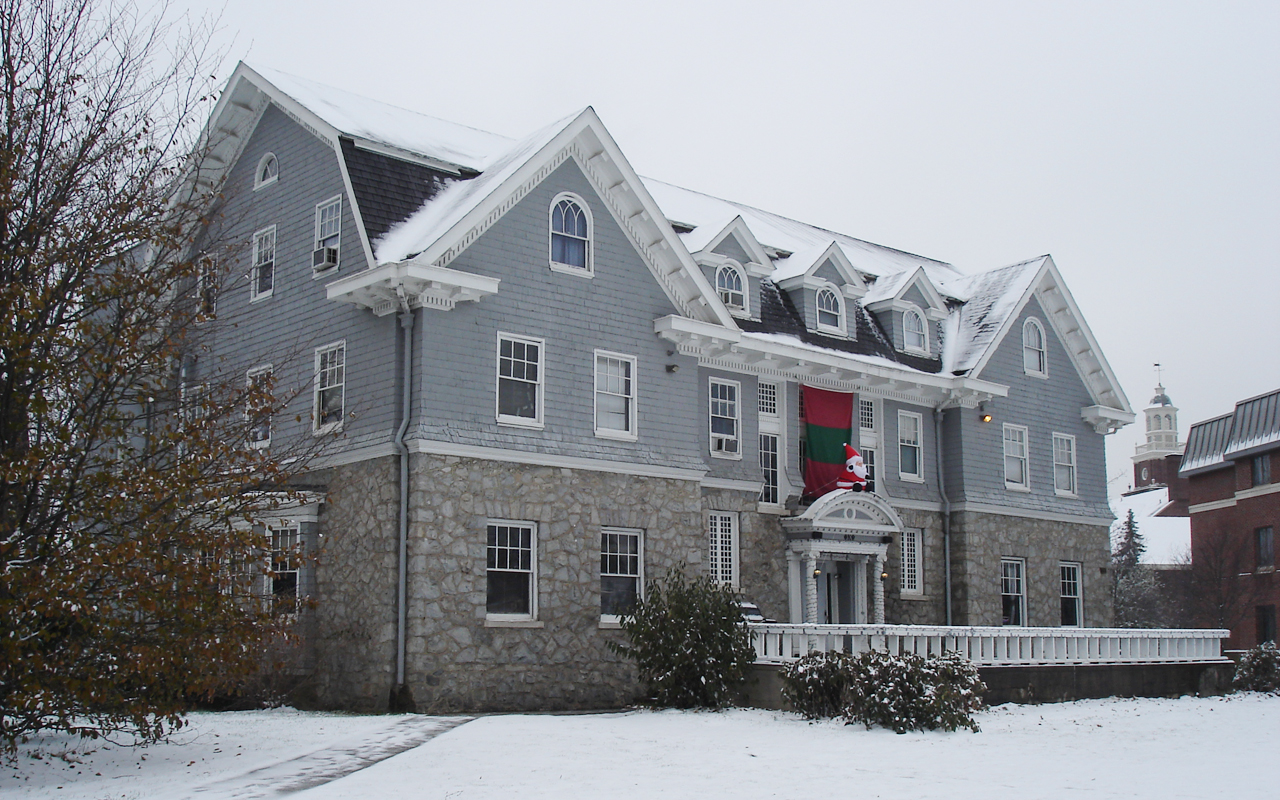
The Phi Psi chapter house at Lafayette College

The chapter naming convention is composed of the top-level subnational division of that chapter's host institution, and a Greek letter in alphabetical order from when the charter was originally issued. For example, the first Phi Psi chapter is from Jefferson College in Canonsburg, Pennsylvania. The first letter in the Greek alphabet is Alpha. The chapter name is Pennsylvania Alpha. The second chapter was installed at the University of Virginia, so it is the Virginia Alpha chapter. The third chapter was installed at Washington & Lee University, in Virginia, so it is the Virginia Beta chapter. The George Washington University chapter is the only one ever chartered in the District of Columbia, so it is the District of Columbia Alpha chapter.

If borders change, the chapter name does not. Virginia Delta was chartered at Bethany College in 1859. After the Civil War, Bethany College was in West Virginia, but the chapter remained Virginia Delta.

Chapters are named based on when the charter is granted, not when it is installed. As a result, there have been rare instances when the chapter naming convention may not appear to be consistent with the charter dates. For example, four charters have been granted in Iowa. The second granted was the fourth installed, so Iowa Beta chartered after Iowa Gamma and Iowa Delta.

== Chapters ==
Following is a list of Phi Kappa Psi chapters. The names of active chapters are indicated in bold. Inactive chapters and institutions are in italics.

Note: This list may be outdated. For the most current information on active chapters and colonies, please refer to Phi Kappa Psi's Chapter Locator.

Order	Chapter	Charter date and range	Institution	Location	Status	Ref.
1	**Pennsylvania Alpha**	1852–1868, 1873	Washington & Jefferson College	Washington, Pennsylvania	Active	(Note: Chapter was founded at Jefferson College, which merged with Washington College in 1865 to create Washington & Jefferson College. At that time, the chapter merged with Pennsylvania Delta and continued under the name of Pennsylvania Alpha.)
2	**Virginia Alpha**	1853–1861, 1865	University of Virginia	Charlottesville, Virginia	Active	(Note: Chapter closed during the Civil War.)
3	**Virginia Beta**	1855–1861, 1865–2015, 2021	Washington and Lee University	Lexington, Virginia	Active	(Note: In 2018, the chapter reformed from the Phi Society which was established in 2015.)
4	**Pennsylvania Beta**	1855	Allegheny College	Meadville, Pennsylvania	Active	(Note: Operated sub rosa until the fall of 1962 because of the faculty's opposition toward fraternities.)
5	Pennsylvania Gamma	1855–1871, 1881–1988, 1991	Bucknell University	Lewisburg, Pennsylvania	Inactive	(Note: Chapter was closed from 1873 until 1880 because of anti-fraternity laws.)
6	Pennsylvania Delta	1855–1865	Washington College	Washington, Pennsylvania	Merged	(Note: Chapter merged into Pennsylvania Alpha when its host institutions merged.)
7	Virginia Gamma	1855–1861, 1865–1900	Hampden–Sydney College	Hampden Sydney, Virginia	Inactive	(Note: Chapter's charter was withdrawn by the fraternity in 1900 due to declining enrollment and a saturated fraternity system.)
8	**Pennsylvania Epsilon**	1855–2012, 2017	Gettysburg College	Gettysburg, Pennsylvania	Active	
9	South Carolina Alpha	1857–1861, 1867–1872, 1884–1892, 1972–March 28, 1992	University of South Carolina	Columbia, South Carolina	Inactive	(Note: Chapter went inactive at the beginning of the Civil War. When the university decided to desegregate in 1872, the chapter went dormant with the withdrawal of almost the entire student body. It was re-chartered in 1884 and remained active until state politics crippled the university to the point that the student body dramatically decreased in size and the chapter closed in 1892. The 1972, it reformed from the Maxey Brotherhood (local), established in 1956. However, in 1991 the chapter was no longer viable due to low membership and it went inactive.)
10	**Mississippi Alpha**	1857–1861, 1881–1912, 1930	University of Mississippi	Oxford, Mississippi	Active	(Note: Anti-fraternity legislation closed all fraternities on campus in 1912. It was re-established in 1930 by absorbing Alpha Delta Mu, established in 1926.)
11	Virginia Delta	1859–1882	Bethany College	Bethany, West Virginia	Inactive	(Note: In 1880, the chapter's members voted to leave the college because of a faculty refusal to punish a student guilty of a vicious assault on a member.)
12	Tennessee Alpha	1859–1861	La Grange Synodical College	La Grange, Tennessee	Inactive	(Note: The chapter went dormant when its entire membership enlisted in the Confederate Army. In 1863, the college was burned to the ground by the Union Army and never recovered)
13	Pennsylvania Zeta	1859–2007	Dickinson College	Carlisle, Pennsylvania	Inactive	
14	**Pennsylvania Eta**	1860	Franklin & Marshall College	Lancaster, Pennsylvania	Active	(Note: Chapter formed from Phi Beta Tau, established in 1858.)
15	Tennessee Beta	1860–1861, 1867–1879	Cumberland University	Lebanon, Tennessee	Inactive	(Note: Chapter membership became concentrated in the law department, and all but one member withdrew or graduated in 1877.)
16	Mississippi Beta	1860–1861	Mississippi College	Clinton, Mississippi	Inactive	
17	Ohio Alpha	1861–2016	Ohio Wesleyan University	Delaware, Ohio	Inactive	(Note: The chapter was closed by the university in the Spring of 2016 after a pledge was found dead in the Delaware Run, a creek close to campus.)
18	**Illinois Alpha**	1864–1870, 1878–2021, 2025	Northwestern University	Evanston, Illinois	Colony	(Note: The Chapter was sanctioned by the Interfraternity Council in 2021 for holding a social event in violation of IFC Codes of Conduct on social gatherings and alcohol possession during COVID-19. Recolonization efforts began in 2025.)
19	**Indiana Alpha**	1865	DePauw University	Greencastle, Indiana	Active	
20	Kentucky Alpha	1865–1866	Transylvania University	Lexington, Kentucky	Inactive	(Note: Chapter closed due to anti-fraternity laws.)
21	Illinois Beta (First)	1865–1869	University of Chicago	Chicago, Illinois	Inactive, Reassigned	(Note: The chapter was chartered at the University of Chicago (now referred to as the Old University of Chicago) that closed in 1886, resulting in the chapter going defunct. A new University of Chicago opened in 1890, and Illinois Beta was revived there in 1894.)
22	**Ohio Beta**	1866–1988, 1991	Wittenberg University	Springfield, Ohio	Active	
23	**Iowa Alpha**	1867–1876, 1885	University of Iowa	Iowa City, Iowa	Active	
24	District of Columbia Alpha	1868–1899, 1991–2016	George Washington University	Washington, D.C.	Inactive	(Note: In 1899, its entire membership enlisted in the Spanish–American War, and the charter was recalled. The chapter was suspended in 2016. Recolonization was attempted in Spring 2020 semester but was not successful due to the Covid-19 pandemic.)
25	Iowa Gamma	1868–1871	Cornell College	Mount Vernon, Iowa	Inactive	
26	New York Alpha	1869–1877, 1885–2020	Cornell University	Ithaca, New York	Inactive	(Note: Chapter formed from the Irving Society, established in 1868. It went inactive in 1877 when Psi Upsilon recruited the existing members into their chapter, a practice that is now prohibited by members of the North American Interfraternity Conference. In 2020, the university "permanently revoked" recognition of the chapter nearly a year after a freshman student was found dead in a gorge after leaving an illegal Christmas-themed "dirty rush" party in October 2019.)
27	**Pennsylvania Theta**	1869	Lafayette College	Easton, Pennsylvania	Active	
28	**Indiana Beta**	1869–2015, February 9, 2019.	Indiana University Bloomington	Bloomington, Indiana	Active	(Note: Chapter formed from Delta Psi Theta (local), established in 1857. After going dormant, it reformed as a colony in 2017.)
29	**Missouri Alpha**	1869–1876, 1908–July 8, 2014, 2019	University of Missouri	Columbia, Missouri	Active	(Note: The chapter went inactive because of anitfraternity actions of the faculty. It was re-established in 1908 from Zeta Chi (local), established in 1906. In 2017, it reformed as a colony.)
30	Tennessee Gamma	1870–1873	University of Nashville	Nashville, Tennessee	Inactive	(Note: Chapter went dormant when its institution closed as a result of an outbreak of Asiatic Cholera. Most of its members did not return to the college and the chapter was not reformed.)
31	**Indiana Gamma**	1870–1901, 1948	Wabash College	Crawfordsville, Indiana	Active	(Note: The chapter closed in 1901 after enrollment in the college dropped dramatically, making it impossible to maintain the standard of the fraternity. It was reformed in 1948 from Gamma Phi (local), established in 1946.)
32	Ohio Gamma	1871–1892	College of Wooster	Wooster, Ohio	Inactive	
33	Illinois Gamma	1871–1884	Monmouth College	Monmouth, Illinois	Inactive	(Note: Chapter was forced to close by anti-fraternity laws but continued sub rosa for ten years until pressure from the faculty resulted in the chapter agreeing to disband)
34	Virginia Epsilon	1871–1879	Randolph–Macon College	Ashland, Virginia	Inactive	(Note: This chapter was founded largely through the efforts of a Phi Kappa Psi alumnus, who was a member of the faculty; after he died, the chapter quickly faded away)
35	New York Gamma	October 10, 1872–1876, 1892-March 24, 1991	Columbia University	New York City, New York	Inactive	
36	Wisconsin Alpha	1875–1894, 1897–1939, 1992–1992	University of Wisconsin–Madison	Madison, Wisconsin	Inactive	
37	**Kansas Alpha**	1876	University of Kansas	Lawrence, Kansas	Active	
38	Michigan Alpha	1876–1972, 1983–2023	University of Michigan	Ann Arbor, Michigan	Inactive	
39	Wisconsin Beta	1876–1877	Racine College	Racine, Wisconsin	Inactive	
40	**Pennsylvania Iota**	1877–1973, 1978	University of Pennsylvania	Philadelphia, Pennsylvania	Active	
41	**Maryland Alpha**	1879–1943, 1949–1969, 1975	Johns Hopkins University	Baltimore, Maryland	Active	
42	**Ohio Delta**	1880–2018	Ohio State University	Columbus, Ohio	Colony	(Note: Began recolonization in the spring of 2023)
43	California Alpha	1881–1892	University of the Pacific	Stockton, California	Inactive	(Note: The chapter's members transferred to Stanford University when it opened and became the founders of California Beta.)
44	New York Delta	1881–1893	Hobart College	Geneva, New York	Inactive	
45	**Wisconsin Gamma**	1881–1970, 1978	Beloit College	Beloit, Wisconsin	Active	(Note: In 1970, the chapter went local and then disbanded. It recolonized in 1977 and was rechartered in 1978.)
46	Iowa Delta	1882–1889	Simpson College	Indianola, Iowa	Inactive	
47	Minnesota Alpha	1883–1888	Carleton College	Northfield, Minnesota	Inactive	(Note: After operating sub-rosa for some time, the chapter failed to receive faculty permission and was disbanded. Most of its members transferred to the University of Minnesota and founded the chapter there.)
48	**New York Beta**	April 18, 1894–September 18, 1995, 2001	Syracuse University	Syracuse, New York	Active	(Note: Chapter formed from Kappa Delta, established in 1882. After going dormant, it reformed as a colony in 2001.)
49	New York Epsilon	April 29, 1887–May 8, 1982	Colgate University	Hamilton, New York	Inactive	(Note: The chapter formed from Aeonia (local), established in 1880.)
50	**Minnesota Beta**	1888	University of Minnesota	Minneapolis, Minnesota	Active	
51	Pennsylvania Kappa	1889–April 17, 1963	Swarthmore College	Swarthmore, Pennsylvania	Inactive	(Note: Chapter returned its charter and became a local fraternity known as Phi Psi)
52	**West Virginia Alpha**	1890–2013, 2017	West Virginia University	Morgantown, West Virginia	Active	(Note: In 2013, the university placed this chapter on suspension following an alleged hazing incident. According to the Morgantown Police Department, a 19-year-old pledge was pushed against a wall and suffered a split chin and broken teeth while doing push-ups and other hazing rituals. After a joint investigation by both the university and the national fraternity, the chapter house was closed and the chapter was suspended for five semesters.)
53	**California Beta**	December 18, 1891	Stanford University	Stanford, California	Active	
54	New York Zeta	1893–1912	Polytechnic Institute of Brooklyn	Brooklyn, New York	Inactive	(Note: Chapter formed from Alpha Phi (local). It went dormant when its charter was withdrawn.)
21	Illinois Beta (Second)	1894–1970, 1985–1997	University of Chicago	Chicago, Illinois	Inactive	
55	**Nebraska Alpha**	1895–2016, 2021	University of Nebraska–Lincoln	Lincoln, Nebraska	Active	(Note: Chapter formed from Zeta Beta (local), established in 1893. In 2016, it was suspended for issues related to alcohol. It reformed as a colony in 2018.)
56	Massachusetts Alpha	1895–1948	Amherst College	Amherst, Massachusetts	Inactive	(Note: The chapter's charter was revoked by the fraternity Executive Council after it broke its promise to the EC in a matter involving membership selection)
57	New Hampshire Alpha	January 24, 1896–1967	Dartmouth College	Hanover, New Hampshire	Inactive	(Note: Chapter formed from Beta Psi, established in 1894. Charter revoked over Issues of the Chapter pledging a Black Student. Now known as Panarchy)
58	**California Gamma**	April 15, 1899–1971, 1978–1991, 1996–1998, 2010	University of California, Berkeley	Berkeley, California	Active	
59	**Indiana Delta**	1901	Purdue University	West Lafayette, Indiana	Active	(Note: Chapter formed from Beta Kappa Kappa, established in 1898.)
60	**Tennessee Delta**	1901–2009, 2012–2018, 2024	Vanderbilt University	Nashville, Tennessee	Active	(Note: Chapter was suspended from 2009 to 2011. It reformed as a colony in 2023 and was rechartered in 2024.)
61	Rhode Island Alpha	February 28, 1902–1978, April 7, 1984–2012	Brown University	Providence, Rhode Island	Inactive	(Note: The chapter turned in its charter in 1978 and because Phi Psi (local) in 1979. It was accepted back as a colony and re-chartered in 1984)
62	**Texas Alpha**	1904	University of Texas at Austin	Austin, Texas	Active	(Note: Chapter formed from Phi Phi Phi (local), established in 1897.)
63	**Illinois Delta**	1904	University of Illinois Urbana-Champaign	Champaign, Illinois	Active	(Note: Chapter formed from Omega Psi, established in 1885.)
64	**Ohio Epsilon**	1906	Case Western Reserve University	Cleveland, Ohio	Active	(Note: Chapter formed from Omega Psi, established in 1885.)
65	**Pennsylvania Lambda**	1912	Pennsylvania State University	State College, Pennsylvania	Active	(Note: Chapter formed from Theta Psi, established in 1905. Later, it absorbed Omega Epsilon.)
66	**Iowa Beta**	September 26, 1913–1999, 2007	Iowa State University	Ames, Iowa	Active	(Note: Chapter formed from the Ozarks (local), established in 1906. After going dormant, it reformed as a colony in 2004.)
67	**Colorado Alpha**	1914–1994, 1998	University of Colorado Boulder	Boulder, Colorado	Active	(Note: Chapter formed from the Friars, established in 1910. After going dormant, it reformed as a colony in 1998.)
68	**Washington Alpha**	1914	University of Washington	Seattle, Washington	Active	(Note: Chapter formed from Phi Phi (local), established in 1906.)
69	**Oklahoma Alpha**	1920–1996, 1999	University of Oklahoma	Norman, Oklahoma	Active	(Note: Chapter formed from Kappa Psi, established in 1918. After going dormant, it reformed as a colony in 1998.)
70	**Oregon Alpha**	1923–1972, 1976–2000, 2010–2019, 2023	University of Oregon	Eugene, Oregon	Active	(Note: Chapter formed from Kappa Theta Chi, established in 1919. After going dormant, it reformed as a colony in 1974, 2009, and 2021.)
71	California Delta	1927–2018	University of Southern California	Los Angeles, California	Inactive	(Note: Chapter formed from Zeta Kappa Epsilon, established in 1912.)
72	Pennsylvania Mu	1927–1934	Carnegie Mellon University	Pittsburgh, Pennsylvania	Inactive	(Note: Chapter formed from Woodlawn, established in 1906. Its charter was withdrawn.)
73	**California Epsilon**	1931–2011, 2015	University of California, Los Angeles	Los Angeles, California	Active	(Note: Chapter formed from Kappa Psi, established in 1925. In 2011, the national fraternity closed the UCLA chapter over repeated hazing and alcohol incidents. It reformed as a colony in 2014.)
74	North Carolina Alpha	1934–2001	Duke University	Durham, North Carolina	Inactive	(Note: Chapter formed from Sigma Delta, established in 1928.)
75	Arizona Alpha	September 20, 1947–1962; 1977 – January 20, 2012	University of Arizona	Tucson, Arizona	Inactive	(Note: Chapter formed from Kappa Psi, established in 1944. After going dormant, it reformed as a colony in 1975 and 2000. Its charter was revoked in 2012 for "repeated instances of hazing over some time".)
76	**Oregon Beta**	1948	Oregon State University	Corvallis, Oregon	Active	(Note: Chapter formed from Sigma Phi Sigma, established in 1919.)
77	Ohio Zeta	1950–1997, 2009–2018	Bowling Green State University	Bowling Green, Ohio	Inactive	(Note: Chapter formed from Beta Sigma, established in 1947. After going dormant, it reformed as a colony in 2006.)
78	**Ohio Eta**	1950	University of Toledo	Toledo, Ohio	Active	(Note: Chapter formed from Sigma Beta Phi, established in 1916.)
79	New York Eta	November 11, 1950–1970, 1984–2023	University of Buffalo	Buffalo, New York	Inactive	(Note: Chapter formed from Beta Chi Epsilon, established in 1916. It was discontinued after the university dissolved all of Greek Life. After the university re-instituted Greek Life, it reformed as a colony in 1983.)
80	**Indiana Epsilon**	February 21, 1953	Valparaiso University	Valparaiso, Indiana	Active	(Note: Chapter formed from Phi Delta Psi (local), established in 1914.)
81	**Texas Beta**	May 9, 1953	Texas Tech University	Lubbock, Texas	Active	(Note: Chapter formed from the Centaur Club, established in 1929.)
82	**Michigan Beta**	1954	Michigan State University	East Lansing, Michigan	Active	(Note: Chapter formed from Theta Sigma, established in 1952.)
83	Connecticut Alpha	1956–1971	Trinity College	Hartford, Connecticut	Inactive	(Note: Chapter formed from Kappa Psi, established in 1954.)
84	Missouri Beta	February 19, 1960–October 16, 1976	Westminster College	Fulton, Missouri	Inactive	(Note: Chapter formed from the Highlanders (local), established in 1933.)
85	**Florida Alpha**	1962–1969, March 7, 1987	Florida State University	Tallahassee, Florida	Active	
86	**Arizona Beta**	December 15, 1962–2013; February 8, 2020	Arizona State University	Tempe, Arizona	Active	
87	**Alabama Alpha**	February 29, 1964	University of Alabama	Tuscaloosa, Alabama	Active	
88	California Zeta	April 25, 1964–1972, 1982–May 31, 1995	University of California, Santa Barbara	Santa Barbara, California	Inactive	(Note: Chapter formed from Phi Psi Zeta, established in 1963. After going dormant, it reformed as a colony in 1981.)
89	New Jersey Alpha	1965–1993	Rider University	Lawrence Township, New Jersey	Inactive	(Note: Chapter formed from Delta Sigma Pi, established in 1934. It was closed by the national fraternity for hazing and racial insensitivity.)
90	Nebraska Beta	November 13, 1965–2017	Creighton University	Omaha, Nebraska	Inactive	(Note: Chapter formed from a split of Alpha Phi Omega, established on January 17, 1953. It was suspended in the Spring 2017 semester through the Fall 2021 semester.)
91	**Rhode Island Beta**	January 8, 1966–1988, 1990–2008, 2016	University of Rhode Island	Kingston, Rhode Island	Active	(Note: Chapter formed from Phi Kappa Theta, established in 1947. After going dormant, it reformed as a colony in 1989 and 2014.)
92	**Ohio Theta**	1966	Ashland University	Ashland, Ohio	Active	(Note: Chapter formed from Phi Sigma Chi, established in 1959.)
93	**California Eta**	1966	California Polytechnic State University, San Luis Obispo	San Luis Obispo, California	Active	
94	**Louisiana Alpha**	May 7, 1966	Louisiana State University	Baton Rouge, Louisiana	Active	
95	Florida Beta	1967–1971, 1977-1991	University of Florida	Gainesville, Florida	Inactive	
96	Oklahoma Beta	1967–1991	Oklahoma State University–Stillwater	Stillwater, Oklahoma	Inactive	
97	**Tennessee Epsilon**	1967	University of Tennessee	Knoxville, Tennessee	Active	
98	**California Theta**	June 17, 1967–1995; April 7, 2018	California State University, Northridge	Los Angeles, California	Active	(Note: Chapter formed from Kappa Delta Psi (local), founded in 1958. It closed in 1995 due to the damage done to the CSUN campus by the 1994 Northridge earthquake. It reformed as a colony in 2015.)
99	**New Jersey Beta**	October 2, 1967–1994, 2010	Monmouth University	West Long Branch, New Jersey	Active	(Note: Chapter formed from Alpha Beta (local), established in 1966. After going dormant, the chapter reformed as a colony in 2009.)
100	Texas Gamma	April 26, 1969–April 14, 1993, 2002–2017	Texas State University	San Marcos, Texas	Inactive	(Note: Chapter formed from Delta Phi Theta, established in 1966. In 2017, pledge Matthew Ellis attended a fraternity event and was found unresponsive in an off-campus apartment complex the next morning. Ellis' death led the university to suspend all Greek activities on campus soon after. The chapter had been put on suspension by the national organization a week earlier for unrelated violations. The local police placed the fraternity under investigation to determine the cause of his death.)
101	**Louisiana Beta**	May 3, 1969–1991, October 2015	University of Louisiana at Lafayette	Lafayette, Louisiana	Active	
102	**Minnesota Gamma**	1969	Minnesota State University, Mankato	Mankato, Minnesota	Active	
103	New Mexico Alpha	1969–2007	Eastern New Mexico University	Portales, New Mexico	Inactive	
104	Pennsylvania Nu	1970–2020	Indiana University of Pennsylvania	Indiana County, Pennsylvania	Inactive	(Note: Chapter formed from Tau Delta Rho, established in 1967.)
105	**Ohio Iota**	1970–1997, 2015	University of Akron	Akron, Ohio	Active	
106	Tennessee Zeta	June 13, 1970–December 21, 1985	University of Memphis	Memphis, Tennessee	Inactive	
107	**Indiana Zeta**	1971–2015, 2022	Butler University	Indianapolis, Indiana	Active	(Note: In 2014, Butler University suspended its Phi Kappa Psi chapter for three years for alcohol violations. Over a fourth of the student body signed a petition asking that the suspension be rescinded. In 2011, the university temporarily suspended the chapter while investigating rape allegations at a house party.)
108	Ohio Kappa	1971–1978, 2018–2023	Kent State University	Kent, Ohio	Inactive	
109	**Ohio Lambda**	1972–2015, 2024	Miami University	Oxford, Ohio	Active	(Note: In 2015, the chapter was suspended through 2019 due to reports of hazing and inappropriate pictures taken of a party attendee that was disseminated through the popular GroupMe messaging app. It reformed as a colony in 2023 and was rechartered in 2024.)
110	Alabama Beta	January 26, 1974–1988, 2005–2019	Auburn University	Auburn, Alabama	Inactive	
111	Montana Alpha	May 31, 1975–January 22, 1983	University of Montana	Missoula, Montana	Inactive	
112	**Virginia Zeta**	1976–2010; September 29, 2018	Virginia Tech	Blacksburg, Virginia	Active	
113	**Georgia Alpha**	1976	University of Georgia	Athens, Georgia	Active	
114	California Iota	April 7, 1979–1995, 1998–2000, 2006–2020	University of California, Davis	Davis, California	Inactive	
115	Arkansas Alpha	December 8, 1979–1991	University of Arkansas	Fayetteville, Arkansas	Inactive	(Note: The chapter was never able to acquire a chapter house through the university. When they lost the property they were using as a chapter house, membership declined to the point that the charter was pulled.)
116	Pennsylvania Xi	May 4, 1984–2021	Edinboro University of Pennsylvania	Edinboro, Pennsylvania	Inactive	
117	**Illinois Epsilon**	March 2, 1985–2017	Illinois State University	Normal, Illinois	Active	(Note: Chapter was suspended in the Fall 2017 semester and recolonized in 2019.)
118	**Delaware Alpha**	March 23, 1985–November 7, 1992, September 27, 2014	University of Delaware	Newark, Delaware	Active	
119	Pennsylvania Omicron	April 27, 1985–March 29, 1992	Lehigh University	Bethlehem, Pennsylvania	Inactive	
120	**Indiana Eta**	March 28, 1987	Indiana State University	Terre Haute, Indiana	Active	
121	New Jersey Gamma	May 2, 1987–March 4, 1995, 2012–Spring 2019	Rutgers University–New Brunswick	New Brunswick, New Jersey	Inactive	(Note: Chapter formed from Alpha Lambda Mu, established in 1986. It was suspended and is not allowed on campus.)
122	Pennsylvania Pi	September 12, 1987–1993	Temple University	Philadelphia, Pennsylvania	Inactive	(Note: Charter was voluntarily returned to the national organization by alumni who did not approve of the direction the chapter was heading.)
123	**Kentucky Beta**	April 23, 1988–2016	University of Kentucky	Lexington, Kentucky	Colony	(Note: In 2016, the University of Kentucky placed this chapter on suspension for five years following reports of hazing and alcohol abuse. Accusations included forced alcohol consumption, forced exercises in/around vomit until the pledge vomited, and forced watching of gay pornography. The chapter admitted that these and other accused hazing activities did occur. The chapter was recolonized in 2023.)
124	Texas Delta	1988–1997	Southern Methodist University	Dallas, Texas	Inactive	
125	Maryland Beta	December 10, 1988–1996	University of Maryland, Baltimore County	Catonsville, Maryland	Inactive	
126	**New Jersey Delta**	April 20, 1990–2018, 2024	The College of New Jersey	Ewing, New Jersey	Active	(Note: Chapter was recolonized in the Spring 2023 semester. Rechartered September 30th, 2024.)
127	**California Kappa**	March 9, 1991	University of California, Irvine	Irvine, California	Active	
128	**Massachusetts Beta**	April 20, 1991	Brandeis University	Waltham, Massachusetts	Active	
129	North Carolina Beta	1991–2021	East Carolina University	Greenville, North Carolina	Inactive	
130	**New York Theta**	1992	Rochester Institute of Technology	Rochester, New York	Active	(Note: Chapter formed from the League of Knights (local), established in 1989.)
131	**Pennsylvania Rho**	May 2, 1992	York College of Pennsylvania	Spring Garden Township, Pennsylvania	Active	
132	Louisiana Gamma	April 24, 1993–2017	Loyola University New Orleans	New Orleans, Louisiana	Inactive	(Note: In 2017, Loyola University New Orleans suspended this chapter for two years following reports of alleged hazing. Accusations included jogging around Audubon Park in the dead of night. The university's chapter unsuccessfully appealed the suspension based on the "inappropriateness of the sanction", according to the university's news publication.)
133	**Illinois Zeta**	October 9, 1993	DePaul University	Chicago, Illinois	Active	
134	**California Lambda**	February 17, 1996–2008; May 1, 2010–Mar 10, 2025	San Diego State University	San Diego, California	Inative	(Note: On 6 May 2008, four members of Phi Kappa Psi at San Diego State University were among dozens of individuals, arrested as the result of an undercover investigation into drug trafficking on the University's campus and in the San Diego college area. The chapter was suspended for 18 months before being fully reinstated on May 1, 2010)
135	**Pennsylvania Sigma**	October 12, 1996	Saint Joseph's University	Philadelphia, Pennsylvania	Active	(Note: Chapter formed at the University of the Sciences, which merged into St. Joseph's (PA) on June 1, 2022.)
136	**Illinois Eta**	1999	Southern Illinois University Edwardsville	Edwardsville, Illinois	Active	
137	**New Jersey Epsilon**	April 14, 2000	Rowan University	Glassboro, New Jersey	Active	
138	**Georgia Beta**	May 20, 2000	Georgia Institute of Technology	Atlanta, Georgia	Active	
139	**Pennsylvania Upsilon**	January 26, 2002	Drexel University	Philadelphia, Pennsylvania	Active	
140	Pennsylvania Tau	February 19, 2002–2003	Penn State Altoona	Logan Township, Pennsylvania	Inactive	
141	**Texas Epsilon**	2002	Stephen F. Austin State University	Nacogdoches, Texas	Active	
142	**Minnesota Delta**	April 27, 2002	University of Minnesota Duluth	Duluth, Minnesota	Active	
143	**Illinois Theta**	February 20, 2003	University of Illinois at Chicago	Chicago, Illinois	Active	
144	**Pennsylvania Phi**	March 20, 2004	Lycoming College	Williamsport, Pennsylvania	Active	
145	**New York Iota**	2004	Binghamton University	Binghamton, New York	Active	
146	**New York Kappa**	2004	State University of New York at Oneonta	Oneonta, New York	Active	
147	**Ohio Mu**	2005	University of Dayton	Dayton, Ohio	Active	
148	**Illinois Iota**	April 21, 2007	Northern Illinois University	DeKalb, Illinois	Active	
149	**Maryland Gamma**	September 29, 2007	University of Maryland, College Park	College Park, Maryland	Active	
150	**Texas Zeta**	2008	Houston Christian University	Houston, Texas	Active	
151	**Ohio Nu**	2008	Ohio University	Athens, Ohio	Active	
152	California Mu	April 25, 2008–2018	Occidental College	Los Angeles, California	Inactive	
153	Indiana Theta	July 31, 2008–2017	Indiana University–Purdue University Indianapolis	Indianapolis, Indiana,	Inactive	
154	California Nu	May 30, 2009–2020	University of California, Riverside	Riverside, California	Inactive	
155	**Ohio Xi**	2010	Capital University	Bexley, Ohio	Active	(Note: Chapter formed by Delta Tau Upsilon, established in 1968.)
156	California Xi	May 1, 2010–2022	California State University, Long Beach	Long Beach, California	Inactive	
157	**Ohio Omicron**	2011	Muskingum University	New Concord, Ohio	Active	
158	Virginia Eta	2012–2022, 2024	Virginia Commonwealth University	Richmond, Virginia	Active	
159	**Indiana Iota**	October 27, 2012	Ball State University	Muncie, Indiana	Active	
160	**Alabama Gamma**	May 2, 2015	University of Alabama in Huntsville	Huntsville, Alabama	Active	
161	**Ohio Pi**	February 23, 2019	Denison University	Granville, Ohio	Active	
162	**Maryland Delta**	October 19, 2019	Towson University	Towson, Maryland	Active	
163	**Virginia Theta**	November 2019	James Madison University	Harrisonburg, Virginia	Active	
164	**Texas Eta**	October 16, 2021	Texas A&M University	College Station, Texas	Active	
165	**South Carolina Beta**	August 23, 2025	Clemson University	Clemson, South Carolina	Active	
