= East Altoona, Pennsylvania =

Unincorporated community in Pennsylvania, US

- Census-designated place
- Location within Pennsylvania Location within the United States
- Coordinates: 40°32′49″N 78°21′49″W
- Country: United States
- State: Pennsylvania
- County: Blair
- Township: Logan

Area
  - Total: 0.26 sq mi (0.67 km^{2})
  - Land: 0.26 sq mi (0.67 km^{2})
  - Water: 0 sq mi (0.00 km^{2})
- Elevation: 1,152 ft (351 m)

Population (2020)
  - Total: 351
  - Density: 1,348.5/sq mi (520.65/km^{2})
- Time zone: UTC-5 (Eastern (EST))
  - Summer (DST): UTC-4 (EDT)
- ZIP Code: 16601 (Altoona)
- Area codes: 814/582
- FIPS code: 42-20752
- GNIS feature ID: 2805490

East Altoona is an unincorporated community and census-designated place (CDP) in Blair County, Pennsylvania, United States. It was first listed as a CDP prior to the 2020 census.

== Geography ==
The CDP is in western Blair County, in the northeastern part of Logan Township. It is in Logan Valley, on the east side of the Little Juniata River, 2.5 miles (4.0 km) northeast of the center of Altoona. Greenwood is 1 mile (1.6 km) to the east, in the neighboring valley of Sandy Run, and Pinecroft is 2 miles (3 km) to the north in Antis Township.

The East Altoona Roundhouse, the largest locomotive-servicing roundhouse in the world in the early 20th century, was located 1 mile (1.6 km) southwest of the current CDP, just outside the Altoona city limits.

== Demographics ==
Historical population
Census	Pop.	Note	%±
2020	351		—
U.S. Decennial Census

== Education ==
The school district is Altoona Area School District. Altoona Area High School is the comprehensive high school.
