= Sickles Corner, Pennsylvania =

Unincorporated community in Pennsylvania, US

- Census-designated place
- Location within Pennsylvania Location within the United States
- Coordinates: 40°33′12″N 78°16′47″W
- Country: United States
- State: Pennsylvania
- County: Blair
- Township: Tyrone

Area
  - Total: 0.15 sq mi (0.40 km^{2})
  - Land: 0.15 sq mi (0.40 km^{2})
  - Water: 0 sq mi (0.0 km^{2})
- Elevation: 1,181 ft (360 m)
- Time zone: UTC-5 (Eastern (EST))
  - Summer (DST): UTC-4 (EDT)
- ZIP Code: 16601 (Altoona)
- Area codes: 814/582
- FIPS code: 42-70608
- GNIS feature ID: 2805561

Sickles Corner is an unincorporated community and census-designated place (CDP) in Blair County, Pennsylvania, United States. It was first listed as a CDP prior to the 2020 census.

The CDP is in northeastern Blair County, in the southwestern part of Tyrone Township. It sits at the southwestern end of Sinking Creek Valley, between two arms of Brush Mountain, rising to the west and the southeast. Kettle Road is the main route through Sickles Corner: it leads northeastward 8 miles (13 km), down the Sinking Creek Valley, to Pennsylvania Route 453 near the Little Juniata River, and southwestward through Elberta and a water gap in Brush Mountain 8 miles (13 km) to Altoona.

== Education ==
The school district is Altoona Area School District. Altoona Area High School is the comprehensive high school.
