= Newburg, Pennsylvania =

Newburg is the name of some places in the U.S. state of Pennsylvania:

- Newburg, Blair County, Pennsylvania
- Newburg, Clearfield County, Pennsylvania
- Newburg, Cumberland County, Pennsylvania
- Newburg, Huntingdon County, Pennsylvania
- Newburg, Northampton County, Pennsylvania
