= Wopsononock, Pennsylvania =

Unincorporated community in Pennsylvania, US

- Census-designated place
- Location within Pennsylvania Location within the United States
- Coordinates: 40°34′4″N 78°27′5″W
- Country: United States
- State: Pennsylvania
- County: Blair
- Township: Logan

Area
  - Total: 0.46 sq mi (1.20 km^{2})
  - Land: 0.46 sq mi (1.20 km^{2})
  - Water: 0 sq mi (0.0 km^{2})
- Elevation: 2,474 ft (754 m)
- Time zone: UTC-5 (Eastern (EST))
  - Summer (DST): UTC-4 (EDT)
- ZIP Code: 16636 (Dysart)
- Area codes: 814/582
- FIPS code: 42-86480
- GNIS feature ID: 2805578

Wopsononock is an unincorporated community and census-designated place (CDP) in Blair County, Pennsylvania, United States. It was first listed as a CDP prior to the 2020 census.

The CDP is in western Blair County, in the northern part of Logan Township. It sits at an elevation of 2,474 feet (754 m) on the crest of the Allegheny Front, 1,000 feet (300 m) above Juniata Gap to the southeast. Juniata Gap Road leads 5 miles (8 km) southeast from Wopsononock to Altoona and leads north and west as Wopsy Road 6 miles (10 km) to Dean in the valley of Clearfield Creek.

== Education ==
The school district is Altoona Area School District. Altoona Area High School is the comprehensive high school.
