= East Sharpsburg, Pennsylvania =

Unincorporated community in Pennsylvania, US

- Census-designated place
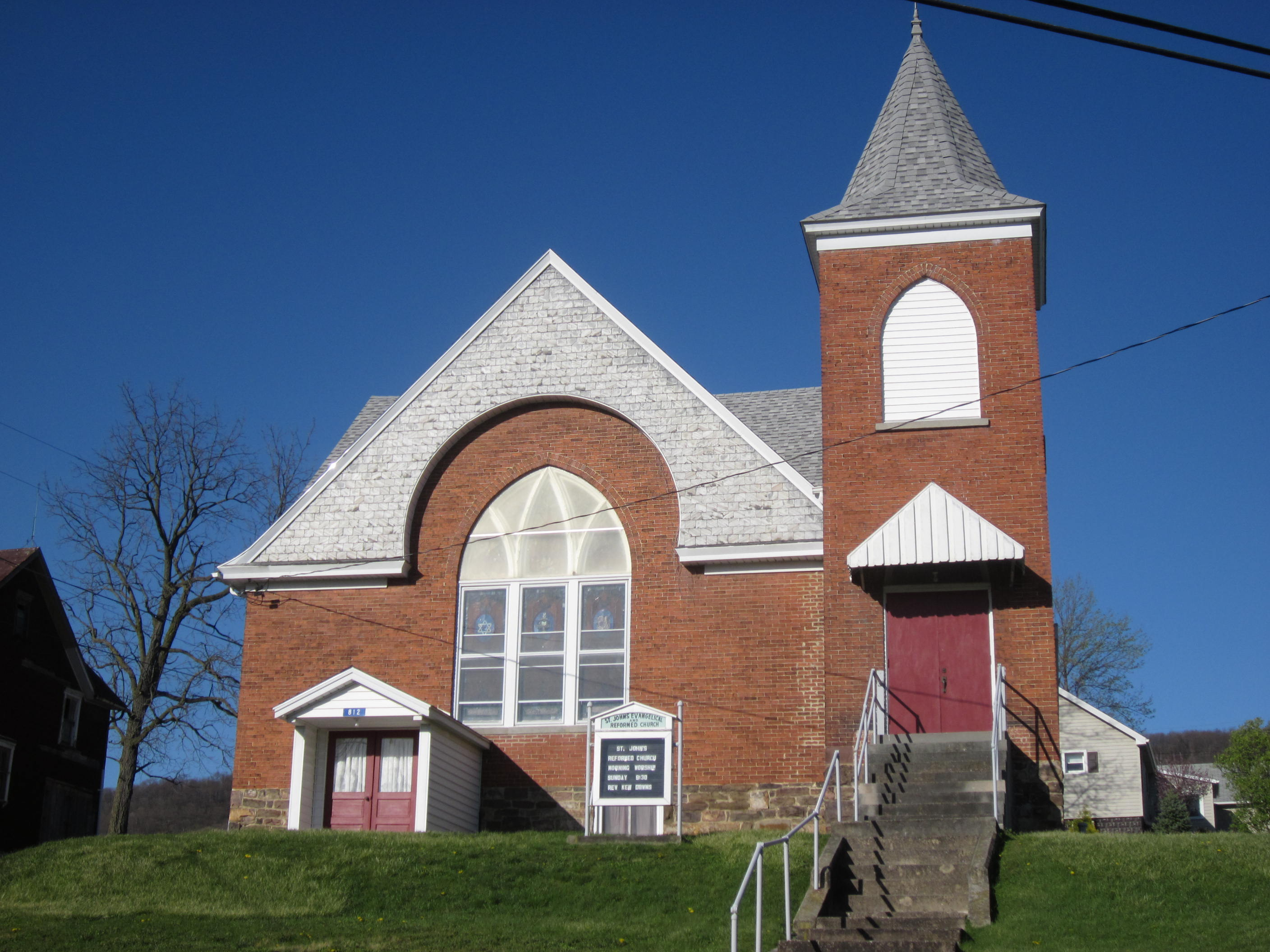
- St. John's Reformed Church

- Location within Pennsylvania Location within the United States
- Coordinates: 40°20′06″N 78°22′25″W
- Country: United States
- State: Pennsylvania
- County: Blair
- Township: Taylor

Area
  - Total: 0.058 sq mi (0.15 km^{2})
  - Land: 0.058 sq mi (0.15 km^{2})
  - Water: 0 sq mi (0.00 km^{2})
- Elevation: 1,289 ft (393 m)

Population (2020)
  - Total: 85
  - Density: 1,429.3/sq mi (551.86/km^{2})
- Time zone: UTC-5 (Eastern (EST))
  - Summer (DST): UTC-4 (EDT)
- ZIP Code: 16673 (Roaring Spring)
- Area codes: 814/582
- FIPS code: 42-21808
- GNIS feature ID: 2805491

East Sharpsburg is an unincorporated community and census-designated place (CDP) in Blair County, Pennsylvania, United States. It was first listed as a CDP prior to the 2020 census.

== Geography ==
The CDP is in southern Blair County, in central Taylor Township. It is mainly on the north side of Pennsylvania Route 164, 1 mile (1.6 km) east of the borough of Roaring Spring and 2.5 miles (4.0 km) northwest of Martinsburg.

East Sharpsburg sits in the western part of Morrisons Cove, at the southern base of Loop Mountain. Plum Creek runs through the community, flowing northwest to Halter Creek at McKee Gap, where the creeks form a water gap between Dunning Mountain and Short Mountain, exiting Morrisons Cove. Halter Creek continues to the Frankstown Branch of the Juniata River, part of the Susquehanna River watershed.

== Demographics ==
Historical population
Census	Pop.	Note	%±
2020	85		—
U.S. Decennial Census

== Education ==
It is in the Spring Cove School District.
