= Altoona Area School District =

School district in Pennsylvania

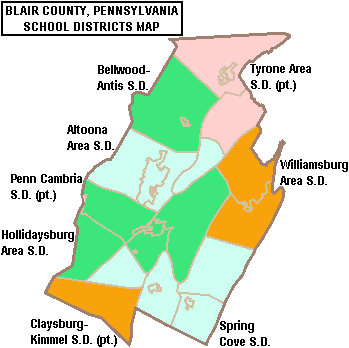
- Map of school districts in Blair County, Pennsylvania

Address
- 1415 Sixth Avenue Altoona, Blair County, Pennsylvania, 16602; United States

District information
- Type: Public
- Grades: PreK-12

Other information
- Website: www.aasdcat.com

The Altoona Area School District is a large, urban, public school district based in Altoona, Pennsylvania. The school district encompasses 59.6 square miles (154 km^{2}), which includes all of Altoona, Logan Township and a small portion of Tyrone Township.

According to 2000 federal census data, it serves a resident population of 63,248. Per District officials, in school year 2007-08 the Altoona Area School District provided basic educational services to 7,946 pupils. The district employed 569 teachers, 557 full-time and part-time support personnel, and 36 administrators. Altoona Area School District had a student body of approximately 8,000 in 2000, it was the 18th largest school district in Pennsylvania. It is one of the largest employers in Blair County with a staff of over 1,500. In 2002, the Altoona Area School District achieved its long-term goal of becoming ISO 9001 certified. It was the fifth school district in the United States to achieve this designation.

== Boundary ==
The district includes all of Altoona and Logan Township, and a small portion of Tyrone Township. It includes the census-designated places of East Altoona, Elberta, Eldorado, Juniata Gap, Mill Run, Newburg, Red Hill, Sickles Corner, and Wopsononock. It also includes most of each of the following CDPs: Greenwood and Lakemont.

== Schools ==
The Altoona Area School District operates fifteen campuses, including one senior high, one junior high, and eight elementary schools. There are also several support locations.

=== Secondary schools ===
- Altoona Area High School
- Altoona Area Junior High School - It replaced Keith and Roosevelt middle schools.
- William P. Kimmel Alternative School
- Greater Altoona Career and Technology Center

=== Elementary schools ===
- McAuliffe Heights Program at Irving
- Juniata Elementary
- Juniata Gap Elementary
- Logan Elementary
- Baker Elementary
- Ebner Elementary
- Penn-Lincoln Elementary
  - It was constructed in 1961 and 1962, and had an addition in 1996.
- Pleasant Valley Elementary
- The Learning Express at WJ - preschool
- Wright Elementary (Now Closed)
- Washington & Jefferson Elementary (Now Serves as The Learning Express at WJ Preschool)

== Extracurriculars ==
The district offers a variety of clubs, activities and sports. It owns three fields with artificial turfs that enhance physical education, intramural and interscholastic athletic opportunities.

== Former schools ==
- D.S. Keith Middle School - It was constructed in 1930, and closed in 2008.
- Roosevelt Middle School - It was constructed circa 1924, and closed in 2008.
- Wilson Elementary (Eveningtide Avenue and Hemlock Street)
  - Still standing as Woodrow Wilson Apartments
- Lowell Elementary (1601 5th Ave., Juniata)
- Wehnwood Elementary (320 E. Wopsononock Ave.)
  - Still standing as Blair-Bedford Central Labor Council
- Keystone Elementary (1601 5th Ave., Juniata)
- Jefferson Elementary(4th Ave. and 2nd Street)
  - Now Jefferson Park
- Fairview Elementary (331 22nd Ave.)
  - Now Fairview Apartments
- Garfield Elementary (1428 20th St.)
  - Building demolished, now a vacant lot
- Curtain Elementary (2900 block West Chestnut Avenue)
  - building partially demolished
- Edison Elementary
  - (building demolished, now Ebner Elementary)

== See also ==
- Dutch Hill (Altoona)
