= Juniata Gap, Pennsylvania =

Unincorporated community in Pennsylvania, US

- Census-designated place
- Location within Pennsylvania Location within the United States
- Coordinates: 40°32′56″N 78°25′46″W
- Country: United States
- State: Pennsylvania
- County: Blair
- Township: Logan

Area
  - Total: 0.53 sq mi (1.37 km^{2})
  - Land: 0.53 sq mi (1.37 km^{2})
  - Water: 0 sq mi (0.00 km^{2})
- Elevation: 1,486 ft (453 m)

Population (2020)
  - Total: 533
  - Density: 1,009.5/sq mi (389.76/km^{2})
- Time zone: UTC-5 (Eastern (EST))
  - Summer (DST): UTC-4 (EDT)
- ZIP Code: 16601 (Altoona)
- Area codes: 814/582
- FIPS code: 42-38632
- GNIS feature ID: 2805514

Juniata Gap is an unincorporated community and census-designated place (CDP) in Blair County, Pennsylvania, United States. It was first listed as a CDP prior to the 2020 census.

Juniata Gap is in western Blair County, in the northwestern part of Logan Township. It sits on the north side of Spring Run at the base of the Allegheny Front, which rises to an elevation of 2,542 feet (775 m) one mile to the west.

Juniata Gap Road is the main route through the community, leading northwest up Spring Run onto the Allegheny Plateau at Wopsononock and southeast into the northern part of Altoona.

== Demographics ==
Historical population
Census	Pop.	Note	%±
2020	533		—
U.S. Decennial Census

== Education ==
The school district is Altoona Area School District. Altoona Area High School is the comprehensive high school.
