= Mill Run, Blair County, Pennsylvania =

Unincorporated community in Pennsylvania, US

Mill Run, Pennsylvania
- Census-designated place
- Location within Pennsylvania Location within the United States
- Coordinates: 40°30′20″N 78°25′55″W
- Country: United States
- State: Pennsylvania
- County: Blair
- Township: Logan

Area
  - Total: 0.30 sq mi (0.78 km^{2})
  - Land: 0.30 sq mi (0.78 km^{2})
  - Water: 0 sq mi (0.00 km^{2})
- Elevation: 1,253 ft (382 m)

Population (2020)
  - Total: 231
  - Density: 765/sq mi (295.3/km^{2})
- Time zone: UTC-5 (Eastern (EST))
  - Summer (DST): UTC-4 (EDT)
- ZIP Code: 16601 (Altoona)
- Area codes: 814/582
- FIPS code: 42-49848
- GNIS feature ID: 2805524

Mill Run is an unincorporated community and census-designated place (CDP) in Blair County, Pennsylvania, United States. It was first listed as a CDP prior to the 2020 census.

The CDP is in western Blair County, south of the center of Logan Township. It is bordered to the east by the city of Altoona and is often considered a neighborhood of the city, even using Altoona's numbering system (including an 11th avenue, 14th avenue, and 15th avenue). The community is in the valley of Mill Run, a stream which comes off the Allegheny Front 2 miles (3 km) to the west and flows southeast, then south, to join Beaverdam Creek west of Hollidaysburg. It is near the Horseshoe Curve. Allegheny Reservoir is just west of the CDP, and Mill Run Reservoir is 1 mile (1.6 km) upstream. Mill Run is part of the watershed of the Frankstown Branch Juniata River, leading to the Susquehanna.

== Demographics ==
Historical population
Census	Pop.	Note	%±
2020	231		—
U.S. Decennial Census

== Education ==
The school district is Altoona Area School District. Altoona Area High School is the comprehensive high school.
