= Red Hill, Blair County, Pennsylvania =

Unincorporated community in Pennsylvania, US

Red Hill, Pennsylvania
- Census-designated place
- Location within Pennsylvania Location within the United States
- Coordinates: 40°31′46″N 78°26′08″W
- Country: United States
- State: Pennsylvania
- County: Blair
- Township: Logan

Area
  - Total: 0.097 sq mi (0.25 km^{2})
  - Land: 0.097 sq mi (0.25 km^{2})
  - Water: 0 sq mi (0.00 km^{2})
- Elevation: 1,673 ft (510 m)

Population (2020)
  - Total: 82
  - Density: 837.8/sq mi (323.47/km^{2})
- Time zone: UTC-5 (Eastern (EST))
  - Summer (DST): UTC-4 (EDT)
- ZIP Code: 16601 (Altoona)
- Area codes: 814/582
- FIPS code: 42-63800
- GNIS feature ID: 2805547

Red Hill is an unincorporated community and census-designated place (CDP) in Blair County, Pennsylvania, United States. It was first listed as a CDP prior to the 2020 census.

The CDP is in western Blair County, in the center of Logan Township. It is along Pennsylvania Route 36, which leads southeast 2 miles (3 km) to Altoona and northwest up the Allegheny Front 7 miles (11 km) to Ashville.

== Demographics ==
Historical population
Census	Pop.	Note	%±
2020	82		—
U.S. Decennial Census

== Education ==
The school district is Altoona Area School District. Altoona Area High School is the comprehensive high school.
