= Greater Altoona Career and Technology Center =

Vocational school in Pennsylvania, US

Coordinates: 40.50852°N 78.39719°W

Greater Altoona Career and Technology Center is a vocational school that serves the area around Blair County, Pennsylvania.

== Career and Technology Center ==
The Greater Altoona Career and Technology Center is a large five-story school building at 1500 Fourth Avenue, Altoona, Pennsylvania 16602.

== Associate districts and schools ==
- Altoona Area School District
- Bellwood-Antis School District
- Hollidaysburg Area School District
- Claysburg-Kimmel School District
