= Taylor Township, Blair County, Pennsylvania =

Township in Pennsylvania, US

Coordinates: 40.32°N 78.41°W

- Township
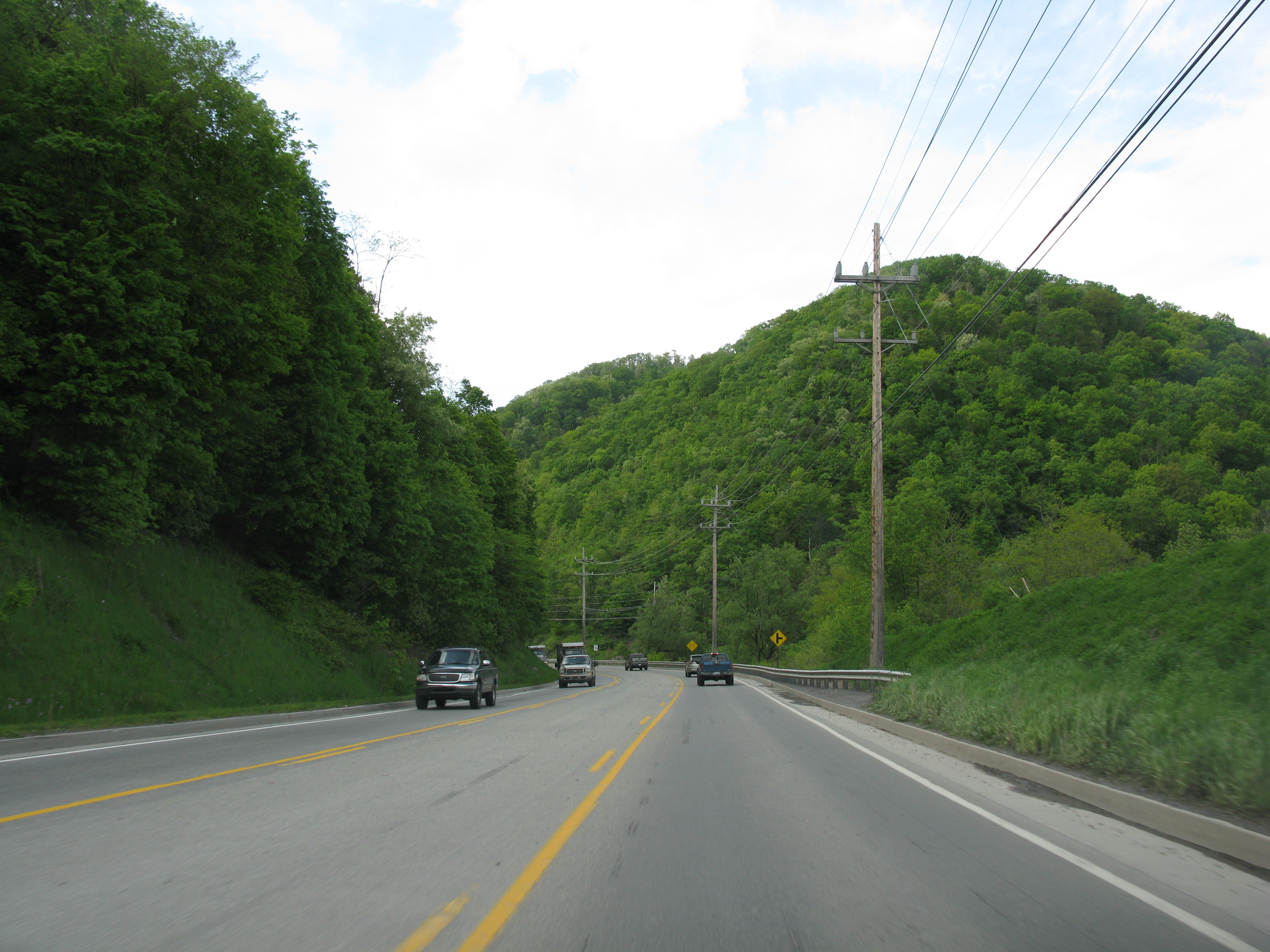
- Along Pennsylvania Route 36 in the township

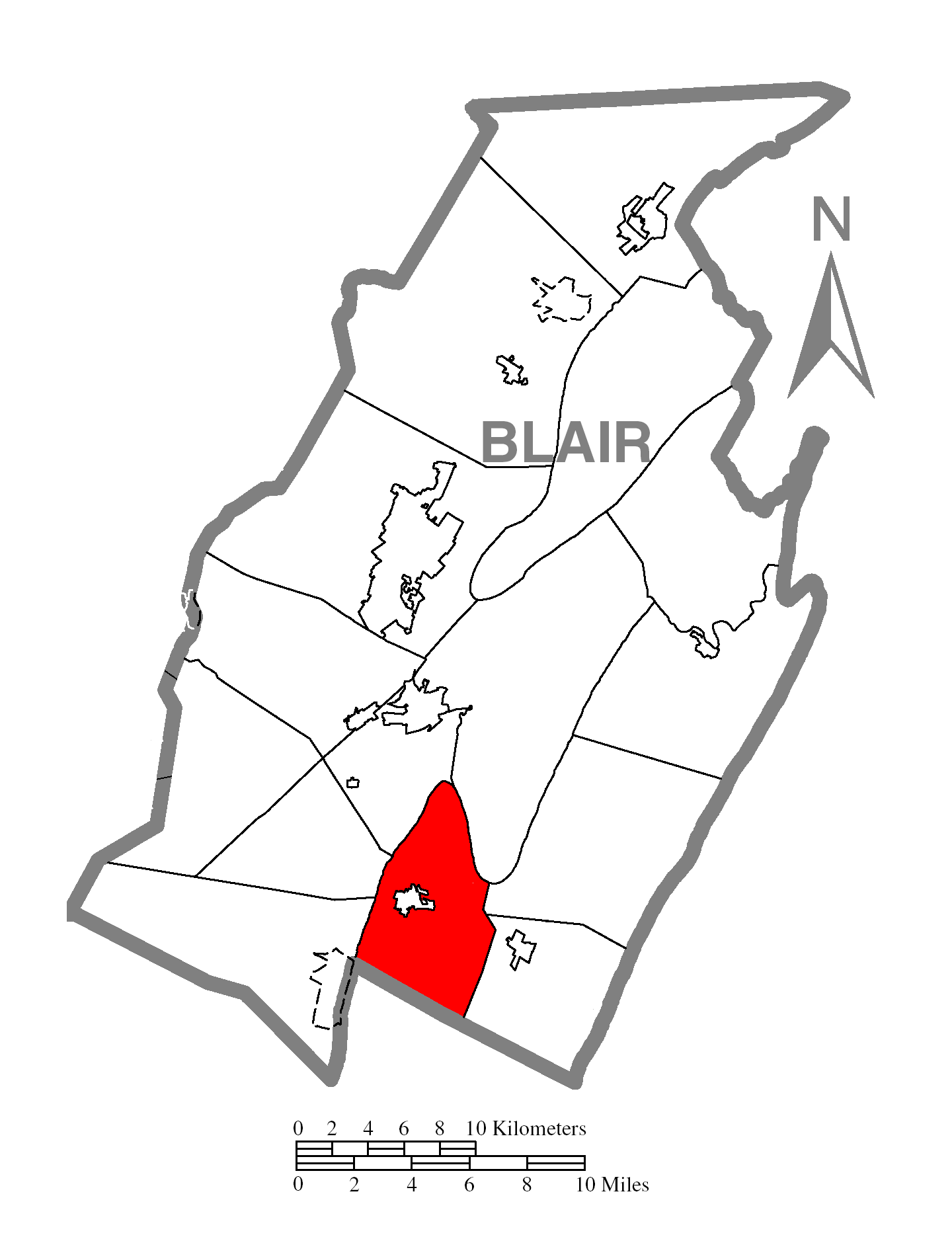
- Map of Blair County, Pennsylvania highlighting Taylor Township

- Map of Blair County, Pennsylvania
- Country: United States
- State: Pennsylvania
- County: Blair
- Settled: 1775
- Incorporated: 1855

Government
  - Type: Board of Supervisors

Area
  - Total: 23.34 sq mi (60.46 km^{2})
  - Land: 23.34 sq mi (60.46 km^{2})
  - Water: 0 sq mi (0.00 km^{2})

Population (2020)
  - Total: 2,296 ▼
  - Estimate (2022): 2,261
  - Density: 105.0/sq mi (40.54/km^{2})
- Time zone: UTC-5 (Eastern (EST))
  - Summer (DST): UTC-4 (EDT)
- Area code: 814
- FIPS code: 42-013-76160
- Website: https://taylortownship.org/

Taylor Township is a township in Blair County, Pennsylvania, United States. It is part of the Altoona, PA Metropolitan Statistical Area. The population was 2,296 at the 2020 census.

== General information ==
- ZIP code: 16673
- Area code: 814
- Local telephone exchange: 224

== Geography ==
Taylor Township is located along the southern border of Blair County; Bedford County is to the south. The township completely surrounds the borough of Roaring Spring. The township's western border follows the ridgecrest of Dunning Mountain and Short Mountain, then curves to the east along the crest of Loop Mountain. Unincorporated places in the township include East Sharpsburg, Dumb Hundred, and Ore Hill.

According to the United States Census Bureau, the township has a total area of 23.4 square miles (60.5 km^{2}), all land.

== Demographics ==
Historical population
Census	Pop.	Note	%±
2010	2,465		—
2020	2,296		−6.9%
2022 (est.)	2,261		−1.5%
U.S. Decennial Census

According to the census of 2000, there were 2,239 people, 852 households, and 685 families residing in the township. The population density was 96.8 inhabitants per square mile (37.4/km^{2}). There were 909 housing units at an average density of 39.3 per square mile (15.2/km^{2}). The racial makeup of the township was 98.84% White, 0.22% African American, 0.13% Asian, 0.18% from other races, and 0.63% from two or more races. Hispanic or Latino of any race were 0.36% of the population.

There were 852 households, out of which 30.5% had children under the age of 18 living with them, 72.3% were married couples living together, 5.0% had a female householder with no husband present, and 19.5% were non-families. 17.1% of all households were made up of individuals, and 8.6% had someone living alone who was 65 years of age or older. The average household size was 2.63 and the average family size was 2.95.

In the township the population was spread out, with 22.6% under the age of 18, 7.8% from 18 to 24, 27.4% from 25 to 44, 27.6% from 45 to 64, and 14.6% who were 65 years of age or older. The median age was 41 years. For every 100 females there were 106.2 males. For every 100 females age 18 and over, there were 101.5 males.

The median income for a household in the township was $41,635, and the median income for a family was $45,795. Males had a median income of $30,368 versus $23,438 for females. The per capita income for the township was $18,260. About 0.9% of families and 3.0% of the population were below the poverty line, including 3.0% of those under age 18 and 6.1% of those age 65 or over.

== Recreation ==
A portion of Pennsylvania State Game Lands Number 147 is located on Dunning Mountain.
