= Maury Patt =

American football player (1915–1961)

No. 21, 2, 64
- Position: End

Personal information
- Born: January 31, 1915; Altoona, Pennsylvania, U.S.
- Died: April 3, 1961 (aged 46); Altoona, Pennsylvania, U.S.
- Listed height: 6 ft 2 in (1.88 m)
- Listed weight: 205 lb (93 kg)

Career information
- High school: Altoona Area (PA)
- College: Carnegie Mellon
- NFL draft: 1937: 5th round, 47th overall pick

Career history
- Detroit Lions (1938); Cleveland Rams (1939–1942)

Career NFL statistics
- Rushing yards: 66
- Rushing average: 4.4
- Receptions: 41
- Receiving yards: 460
- Total touchdowns: 2
- Stats at Pro Football Reference

Maurice Howard "Babe" Patt (January 31, 1915 – April 3, 1961) was an American professional football player, who played in the National Football League for the Detroit Lions and the Cleveland Rams. He was drafted in the fifth round of the 1937 NFL Draft with the 47th overall pick. Patt played End on offense and defense. His best offensive season was 1941 when he had 17 receptions for 163 yards and 1 touchdown. For his career, he caught 41 passes for 460 yards. He served in the United States Marines Corps during World War II and did not return to football after the war. He was born and died in Altoona, Pennsylvania.
