= Eldorado, Pennsylvania =

Unincorporated community in Pennsylvania, US

- Census-designated place
- Location within Pennsylvania Location within the United States
- Coordinates: 40°28′59″N 78°26′18″W
- Country: United States
- State: Pennsylvania
- County: Blair
- Township: Logan

Area
  - Total: 0.72 sq mi (1.87 km^{2})
  - Land: 0.72 sq mi (1.87 km^{2})
  - Water: 0 sq mi (0.00 km^{2})
- Elevation: 1,257 ft (383 m)

Population (2020)
  - Total: 712
  - Density: 984.0/sq mi (379.92/km^{2})
- Time zone: UTC-5 (Eastern (EST))
  - Summer (DST): UTC-4 (EDT)
- ZIP Code: 16601 (Altoona)
- Area codes: 814/582
- FIPS code: 42-22856
- GNIS feature ID: 2805493

Eldorado is an unincorporated community and census-designated place (CDP) in Blair County, Pennsylvania, United States. It was first listed as a CDP prior to the 2020 census.

== Geography ==
The CDP is in western Blair County, along the southern border of Logan Township. It is bordered to the south by Allegheny Township and to the east by the Eldorado neighborhood in the city of Altoona.

Eldorado sits on the south side of the valley of Burgoon Run, at the base of the Allegheny Front, which rises to an elevation of 2,421 feet (738 m) just over 2 miles (3 km) to the west. Horseshoe Curve on the Pittsburgh Line of the Norfolk Southern Railway is 2.5 miles (4.0 km) to the northwest, up the valley of Burgoon Run.

== Demographics ==
Historical population
Census	Pop.	Note	%±
2020	712		—
U.S. Decennial Census

== Education ==
The school district is Altoona Area School District. Altoona Area High School is the comprehensive high school.
