= Dumb Hundred, Pennsylvania =

Unincorporated community in Pennsylvania, US

- Census-designated place
- Location within Pennsylvania Location within the United States
- Coordinates: 40°19′01″N 78°24′38″W
- Country: United States
- State: Pennsylvania
- County: Blair
- Township: Taylor

Area
  - Total: 0.19 sq mi (0.49 km^{2})
  - Land: 0.19 sq mi (0.49 km^{2})
  - Water: 0 sq mi (0.00 km^{2})
- Elevation: 1,283 ft (391 m)

Population (2020)
  - Total: 84
  - Density: 445.8/sq mi (172.12/km^{2})
- Time zone: UTC-5 (Eastern (EST))
  - Summer (DST): UTC-4 (EDT)
- ZIP Code: 16673 (Roaring Spring)
- Area codes: 814/582
- FIPS code: 42-20214
- GNIS feature ID: 2805485

Dumb Hundred is an unincorporated community and census-designated place (CDP) in Blair County, Pennsylvania, United States. It was first listed as a CDP prior to the 2020 census.

The CDP is in southern Blair County, in the southwestern part of Taylor Township. It sits along Pennsylvania Route 867, which leads north 1 mile (1.6 km) to Roaring Spring and south 14 miles (23 km) to Interstate 99 at St. Clairsville.

Dumb Hundred is in the western part of the Morrisons Cove valley, with Dunning Mountain rising to the west.

== Demographics ==
Historical population
Census	Pop.	Note	%±
2020	84		—
U.S. Decennial Census

== Education ==
It is in the Spring Cove School District.
