= Elberta, Pennsylvania =

Unincorporated community in Pennsylvania, US

- Census-designated place
- Location within Pennsylvania Location within the United States
- Coordinates: 40°30′45″N 78°19′27″W
- Country: United States
- State: Pennsylvania
- County: Blair
- Township: Tyrone

Area
  - Total: 0.63 sq mi (1.63 km^{2})
  - Land: 0.63 sq mi (1.63 km^{2})
  - Water: 0 sq mi (0.00 km^{2})
- Elevation: 1,765 ft (538 m)

Population (2020)
  - Total: 271
  - Density: 431.1/sq mi (166.46/km^{2})
- Time zone: UTC-5 (Eastern (EST))
  - Summer (DST): UTC-4 (EDT)
- ZIP Code: 16601 (Altoona)
- Area codes: 814/582
- FIPS code: 42-22776
- GNIS feature ID: 2805492

Elberta is an unincorporated community and census-designated place (CDP) in Blair County, Pennsylvania, United States. It was first listed as a CDP prior to the 2020 census.

== Geography ==
The CDP is in central Blair County, in the southern end of Tyrone Township. It is at the headwaters of Sinking Run, in a valley between two arms of Brush Mountain. Sinking Run flows northeast into Sinking Valley and joins the Little Juniata River at the northeastern end of Tyrone Township.

Kettle Road is the only through road in Elberta. It leads west through the Kettle Creek water gap in Brush Mountain 4 miles (6 km) to Altoona, while to the northeast it leads 11 miles (18 km) through Sinking Valley to Pennsylvania Route 453.

== Demographics ==
Historical population
Census	Pop.	Note	%±
2020	271		—
U.S. Decennial Census

== Education ==
The school district is Altoona Area School District. Altoona Area High School is the comprehensive high school.
