= Ore Hill, Pennsylvania =

Unincorporated community in Pennsylvania, US

- Census-designated place
- Location within Pennsylvania Location within the United States
- Coordinates: 40°17′35″N 78°24′7″W
- Country: United States
- State: Pennsylvania
- County: Blair
- Township: Taylor

Area
  - Total: 0.12 sq mi (0.31 km^{2})
  - Land: 0.12 sq mi (0.31 km^{2})
  - Water: 0 sq mi (0.00 km^{2})
- Elevation: 1,460 ft (450 m)

Population (2020)
  - Total: 106
  - Density: 882.6/sq mi (340.78/km^{2})
- Time zone: UTC-5 (Eastern (EST))
  - Summer (DST): UTC-4 (EDT)
- ZIP Code: 16673 (Roaring Spring)
- Area codes: 814/582
- FIPS code: 42-57016
- GNIS feature ID: 2805537

Ore Hill is an unincorporated community and census-designated place (CDP) in Blair County, Pennsylvania, United States. It was first listed as a CDP prior to the 2020 census.

The CDP is on the southern edge of Blair County, in the southern part of Taylor Township along the Bedford County line. It is 3 miles (5 km) south of the borough of Roaring Spring.

== Demographics ==
Historical population
Census	Pop.	Note	%±
2020	106		—
U.S. Decennial Census

== Education ==
It is in the Spring Cove School District.
