= Newburg, Blair County, Pennsylvania =

Unincorporated community in Pennsylvania, US

Newburg, Pennsylvania
- Census-designated place
- Location within Pennsylvania Location within the United States
- Coordinates: 40°31′17″N 78°25′18″W
- Country: United States
- State: Pennsylvania
- County: Blair
- Township: Logan

Area
  - Total: 0.18 sq mi (0.46 km^{2})
  - Land: 0.18 sq mi (0.46 km^{2})
  - Water: 0 sq mi (0.00 km^{2})
- Elevation: 1,398 ft (426 m)

Population (2020)
  - Total: 353
  - Density: 1,972/sq mi (761.5/km^{2})
- Time zone: UTC-5 (Eastern (EST))
  - Summer (DST): UTC-4 (EDT)
- ZIP Code: 16601 (Altoona)
- Area codes: 814/582
- FIPS code: 42-53328
- GNIS feature ID: 2805532

Newburg is an unincorporated community and census-designated place (CDP) in Blair County, Pennsylvania, United States. It was first listed as a CDP prior to the 2020 census.

The CDP is in western Blair County, in Logan Township along the western border of Altoona. Pennsylvania Route 36 (18th Street) runs through the community, leading southeast into Altoona and northwest up the Allegheny Front, 8 miles (13 km) to Ashville.

== Demographics ==
Historical population
Census	Pop.	Note	%±
2020	353		—
U.S. Decennial Census

== Education ==
The school district is Altoona Area School District. Altoona Area High School is the comprehensive high school.
