= Greenwood, Pennsylvania =

Unincorporated community in Pennsylvania, US

- Census-designated place
- Location within Pennsylvania Location within the United States
- Coordinates: 40°32′14″N 78°21′16″W
- Country: United States
- State: Pennsylvania
- County: Blair
- Township: Logan

Area
  - Total: 4.25 km^{2} (1.64 sq mi)
  - Land: 4.25 km^{2} (1.64 sq mi)
  - Water: 0.00 km^{2} (0 sq mi)
- Elevation: 362 m (1,188 ft)

Population (2020)
  - Total: 3,114
  - Density: 733.06/km^{2} (1,898.6/sq mi)
- Time zone: UTC-5 (Eastern (EST))
  - Summer (DST): UTC-4 (EDT)
- FIPS code: 42-31368
- GNIS feature ID: 2630602

Greenwood is a census-designated place in Logan Township, Blair County, Pennsylvania, United States. It is located near I-99 and is adjacent in the northeast to the city of Altoona. As of the 2010 census, the population was 2,458 residents.

== Demographics ==
Historical population
Census	Pop.	Note	%±
2020	3,114		—
U.S. Decennial Census

=== 2020 census ===
As of the 2020 census, Greenwood had a population of 3,114.

The median age was 50.4 years. 15.3% of residents were under the age of 18 and 27.5% of residents were 65 years of age or older. For every 100 females there were 92.6 males, and for every 100 females age 18 and over there were 93.9 males age 18 and over.

100.0% of residents lived in urban areas, while 0.0% lived in rural areas.

There were 1,397 households in Greenwood, of which 23.0% had children under the age of 18 living in them. Of all households, 49.9% were married-couple households, 19.0% were households with a male householder and no spouse or partner present, and 23.6% were households with a female householder and no spouse or partner present. About 31.4% of all households were made up of individuals and 15.2% had someone living alone who was 65 years of age or older.

There were 1,498 housing units, of which 6.7% were vacant. The homeowner vacancy rate was 1.7% and the rental vacancy rate was 8.4%.

Racial composition as of the 2020 census
Race	Number	Percent
White	2,916	93.6%
Black or African American	42	1.3%
American Indian and Alaska Native	1	0.0%
Asian	30	1.0%
Native Hawaiian and Other Pacific Islander	0	0.0%
Some other race	15	0.5%
Two or more races	110	3.5%
Hispanic or Latino (of any race)	50	1.6%

== Education ==
The school district for most of the CDP is Altoona Area School District. Altoona Area High School is the comprehensive high school for that district.

A portion of the CDP is in Bellwood-Antis School District.
