= Blair County, Pennsylvania =

County in Pennsylvania, United States

- County
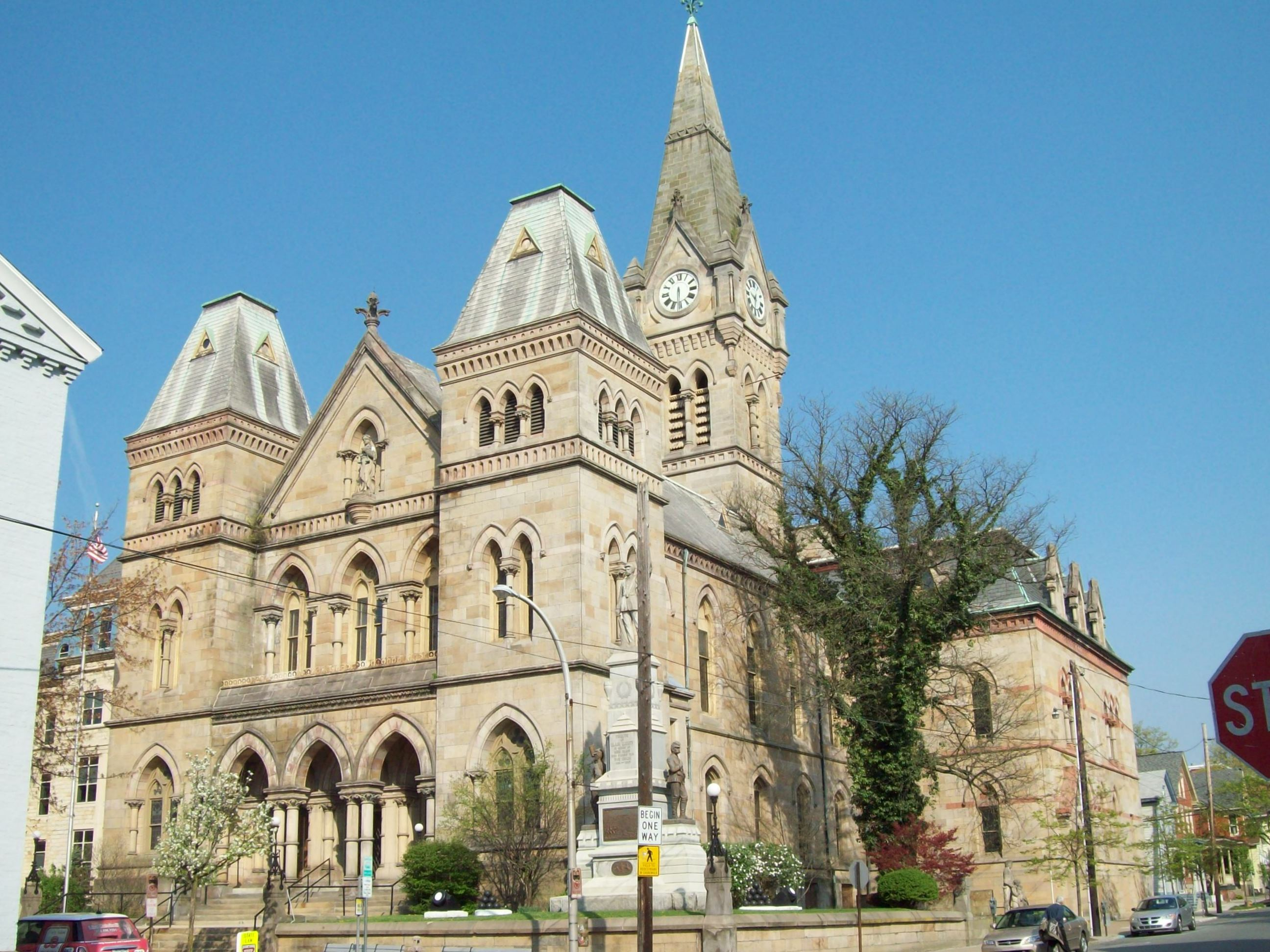
- Blair County Courthouse in Hollidaysburg

- Flag Seal Logo

- Location within the U.S. state of Pennsylvania
- Coordinates: 40°28′N 78°21′W
- Country: United States
- State: Pennsylvania
- Founded: February 26, 1846
- Seat: Hollidaysburg
- Largest city: Altoona

Area
  - Total: 527 sq mi (1,360 km^{2})
  - Land: 526 sq mi (1,360 km^{2})
  - Water: 1.3 sq mi (3.4 km^{2}) 0.2%

Population (2020)
  - Total: 122,822
  - Estimate (2025): 119,541 ▼
  - Density: 234/sq mi (90/km^{2})
- Time zone: UTC−5 (Eastern)
  - Summer (DST): UTC−4 (EDT)
- Congressional district: 13th
- Website: www.blairco.org

Pennsylvania Historical Marker
- Designated: April 13, 1982

Blair County is a county in the Commonwealth of Pennsylvania. As of the 2020 census, the population was 122,822. Its county seat is Hollidaysburg, and its largest city is Altoona. The county was created on February 26, 1846, from parts of Huntingdon and Bedford counties. The county is part of the Southwest region of the commonwealth. (Note: Includes Westmoreland, Cambria, Fayette, Blair, Indiana, Somerset, Bedford, Huntingdon, Greene and Fulton Counties)

Blair County comprises the Altoona, PA metropolitan statistical area. It is also part of the Altoona-Huntingdon, PA Combined Statistical Area, which includes Blair and Huntingdon counties.

== Geography ==
According to the U.S. Census Bureau, the county has a total area of 527 square miles (1,360 km^{2}), of which 526 square miles (1,360 km^{2}) is land and 1.3 square miles (3.4 km^{2}) (0.2%) is water. Blair County is one of the 423 counties served by the Appalachian Regional Commission, and it is identified as part of "Greater Appalachia" by Colin Woodard in his book American Nations: A History of the Eleven Rival Regional Cultures of North America.

=== Features ===
- Brush Mountain
- Logan Valley
- Morrison Cove
- Tussey Mountain

=== Adjacent counties ===
- Centre County (north)
- Huntingdon County (east)
- Bedford County (south)
- Cambria County (west)
- Clearfield County (northwest)

=== National protected area ===
- Allegheny Portage Railroad National Historic Site (part)

=== Major highways ===
- I-99 / US 220
- US 22
- US 220 Bus.
- PA 36
- PA 164
- PA 350
- PA 453
- PA 550
- PA 764
- PA 865
- PA 866
- PA 867
- PA 867 Truck

=== Climate ===
Blair has a warm-summer humid continental climate (Dfb).

Climate data for Altoona
Month	Jan	Feb	Mar	Apr	May	Jun	Jul	Aug	Sep	Oct	Nov	Dec	Year
Record high °F (°C)	78 (26)	76 (24)	85 (29)	91 (33)	94 (34)	97 (36)	103 (39)	102 (39)	96 (36)	90 (32)	82 (28)	74 (23)	103 (39)
Mean daily maximum °F (°C)	31.9 (−0.1)	34.6 (1.4)	44.7 (7.1)	57.8 (14.3)	67.6 (19.8)	77.1 (25.1)	81.4 (27.4)	80.3 (26.8)	72.3 (22.4)	61.3 (16.3)	49.4 (9.7)	37.1 (2.8)	57.9 (14.4)
Mean daily minimum °F (°C)	15.6 (−9.1)	17.7 (−7.9)	25.5 (−3.6)	36.6 (2.6)	46.8 (8.2)	54.9 (12.7)	60.2 (15.7)	58.4 (14.7)	51.3 (10.7)	41.4 (5.2)	32.1 (0.1)	21.9 (−5.6)	38.5 (3.6)
Record low °F (°C)	−29 (−34)	−25 (−32)	−7 (−22)	8 (−13)	20 (−7)	32 (0)	38 (3)	34 (1)	26 (−3)	15 (−9)	0 (−18)	−13 (−25)	−29 (−34)
Average precipitation inches (mm)	2.64 (67)	2.43 (62)	3.48 (88)	3.63 (92)	4.30 (109)	4.08 (104)	4.14 (105)	3.50 (89)	3.85 (98)	3.43 (87)	3.71 (94)	3.11 (79)	42.64 (1,083)
Average snowfall inches (cm)	11.2 (28)	14.3 (36)	16.9 (43)	2.5 (6.4)	0.1 (0.25)	0 (0)	0 (0)	0 (0)	0 (0)	0.2 (0.51)	3.3 (8.4)	12.1 (31)	60.6 (154)
Source: Pennsylvania State Climatologist

== Demographics ==
Historical population
Census	Pop.	Note	%±
1850	21,777		—
1860	27,829		27.8%
1870	38,051		36.7%
1880	52,740		38.6%
1890	70,866		34.4%
1900	85,099		20.1%
1910	108,858		27.9%
1920	128,334		17.9%
1930	139,840		9.0%
1940	140,358		0.4%
1950	139,519		−0.6%
1960	137,270		−1.6%
1970	135,356		−1.4%
1980	136,621		0.9%
1990	130,542		−4.4%
2000	129,144		−1.1%
2010	127,089		−1.6%
2020	122,822		−3.4%
2025 (est.)	119,541	▼	−2.7%

=== 2020 census ===
As of the 2020 census, the county had a population of 122,822. The median age was 44.3 years, with 19.8% of residents under the age of 18 and 22.3% of residents 65 years of age or older. For every 100 females there were 96.3 males, and for every 100 females age 18 and over there were 93.9 males age 18 and over.

The racial makeup of the county was 92.5% White, 2.1% Black or African American, 0.1% American Indian and Alaska Native, 0.7% Asian, <0.1% Native Hawaiian and Pacific Islander, 0.6% from some other race, and 3.9% from two or more races. Hispanic or Latino residents of any race comprised 1.4% of the population.

74.3% of residents lived in urban areas, while 25.7% lived in rural areas.

There were 51,227 households in the county, of which 25.6% had children under the age of 18 living in them. Of all households, 45.9% were married-couple households, 18.7% were households with a male householder and no spouse or partner present, and 27.9% were households with a female householder and no spouse or partner present. About 31.4% of all households were made up of individuals and 15.5% had someone living alone who was 65 years of age or older.

There were 55,700 housing units, of which 8.0% were vacant. Among occupied housing units, 69.7% were owner-occupied and 30.3% were renter-occupied. The homeowner vacancy rate was 1.6% and the rental vacancy rate was 7.9%.

Blair County, Pennsylvania – Racial and ethnic composition Note: the US Census treats Hispanic/Latino as an ethnic category. This table excludes Latinos from the racial categories and assigns them to a separate category. Hispanics/Latinos may be of any race.
Race / Ethnicity (NH = Non-Hispanic)	Pop 2000	Pop 2010	Pop 2020	% 2000	% 2010	% 2020
White alone (NH)	125,641	121,495	113,016	97.28%	95.59%	92.01%
Black or African American alone (NH)	1,495	2,051	2,463	1.15%	1.61%	2.00%
Native American or Alaska Native alone (NH)	103	125	134	0.07%	0.09%	0.10%
Asian alone (NH)	461	689	868	0.35%	0.54%	0.70%
Pacific Islander alone (NH)	15	26	12	0.01%	0.02%	0.00%
Other race alone (NH)	53	52	367	0.04%	0.04%	0.29%
Mixed race or Multiracial (NH)	714	1,421	4,254	0.55%	1.11%	3.46%
Hispanic or Latino (any race)	662	1,230	1,708	0.51%	0.96%	1.39%
Total	129,144	127,089	122,822	100.00%	100.00%	100.00%

=== 2000 census ===
As of the 2000 census, there were 127,089 people and 52,159 households within the county. The population density was 246 people per square mile (95 people/km^{2}). There were 55,061 housing units at an average density of 105 units per square mile (41/km^{2}). The racial makeup of the county was 96.18% White, 1.68% Black or African American, 0.11% Native American, 0.56% Asian, 0.02% Pacific Islander, 0.23% from other races, and 1.22% from two or more races. 0.97% of the population were Hispanic or Latino of any race. 40.0% were of German, 12.2% Irish, 10.7% Italian, 9.9% American, and 6.0% English ancestry.

There were 52,159 households, out of which 28.4% had children under the age of 18 living with them, 52.60% were married couples living together, 11.20% had a female householder with no husband present, and 32.30% were non-families. 27.80% of all households were made up of individuals, and 13.30% had someone living alone who was 65 years of age or older. The average household size was 2.43 and the average family size was 2.96.

In the county, the population was spread out, with 21.1% under the age of 18, 3.5% from 18 to 19, 5.9% from 20 to 24, 11.1% from 25 to 34, 19.3% from 35 to 49, 21.4% from 50 to 64, and 17.7% who were 65 years of age or older. The median age was 40 years. The population was 48.55% male and 51.45% female.

== Law and government ==
Blair County has been a Republican Party stronghold since the party was founded. Franklin D. Roosevelt in 1936 and Lyndon B. Johnson in 1964 are the only Democratic presidential candidates to date to win the county (with neither taking more than 52% of the county's vote), although Theodore Roosevelt won it as the candidate of the Progressive Party in 1912. In 2016 and 2024, it played a crucial role in helping Donald Trump carry Pennsylvania.

United States presidential election results for Blair County, Pennsylvania
Year	Republican		Democratic		Third party(ies)	
Year	No.	%	No.	%	No.	%
1880	5,808	53.95%	4,728	43.92%	230	2.14%
1884	6,396	55.96%	4,649	40.67%	385	3.37%
1888	7,311	56.95%	5,175	40.31%	351	2.73%
1892	7,407	56.75%	5,265	40.34%	380	2.91%
1896	10,382	65.50%	4,840	30.53%	629	3.97%
1900	9,749	65.81%	4,528	30.57%	537	3.62%
1904	12,482	73.46%	3,675	21.63%	835	4.91%
1908	10,583	63.01%	4,981	29.66%	1,232	7.34%
1912	3,138	18.16%	4,108	23.78%	10,030	58.06%
1916	9,893	55.16%	7,002	39.04%	1,040	5.80%
1920	15,035	56.97%	5,668	21.48%	5,689	21.56%
1924	20,313	65.93%	4,244	13.78%	6,251	20.29%
1928	34,356	73.53%	12,104	25.90%	266	0.57%
1932	19,553	56.95%	13,709	39.93%	1,073	3.13%
1936	24,711	46.98%	27,038	51.41%	848	1.61%
1940	26,639	55.11%	21,573	44.63%	125	0.26%
1944	24,925	57.82%	18,003	41.76%	178	0.41%
1948	22,382	60.68%	14,050	38.09%	454	1.23%
1952	32,113	65.44%	16,851	34.34%	106	0.22%
1956	33,623	65.68%	17,503	34.19%	65	0.13%
1960	35,297	64.40%	19,445	35.48%	67	0.12%
1964	24,301	48.09%	26,157	51.76%	73	0.14%
1968	28,780	59.59%	15,803	32.72%	3,713	7.69%
1972	33,126	75.10%	10,023	22.72%	961	2.18%
1976	28,290	59.73%	18,397	38.84%	679	1.43%
1980	28,931	62.41%	15,014	32.39%	2,414	5.21%
1984	30,104	65.52%	15,651	34.06%	190	0.41%
1988	25,623	61.50%	15,588	37.42%	451	1.08%
1992	21,447	47.92%	14,857	33.19%	8,454	18.89%
1996	21,282	52.30%	15,036	36.95%	4,373	10.75%
2000	28,376	62.86%	15,774	34.94%	990	2.19%
2004	35,751	65.99%	18,105	33.42%	322	0.59%
2008	32,708	61.37%	19,813	37.17%	777	1.46%
2012	33,319	66.16%	16,276	32.32%	770	1.53%
2016	39,135	70.72%	13,958	25.22%	2,248	4.06%
2020	45,306	71.07%	17,636	27.67%	806	1.26%
2024	46,352	71.16%	18,127	27.83%	661	1.01%

United States Senate election results for Blair County, Pennsylvania1
Year	Republican		Democratic		Third party(ies)	
Year	No.	%	No.	%	No.	%
1994	20,259	58.98%	12,456	36.26%	1,634	4.76%
2000	30,343	67.95%	12,863	28.81%	1,449	3.24%
2006	21,504	55.59%	17,179	44.41%	0	0.00%
2012	31,666	63.10%	17,424	34.72%	1,097	2.19%
2018	27,826	64.46%	14,599	33.82%	740	1.71%
2024	44,741	69.13%	18,445	28.50%	1,537	2.37%

United States Senate election results for Blair County, Pennsylvania3
Year	Republican		Democratic		Third party(ies)	
Year	No.	%	No.	%	No.	%
1992	24,337	54.43%	16,960	37.93%	3,417	7.64%
1998	20,223	72.60%	6,748	24.22%	885	3.18%
2004	34,158	64.20%	14,562	27.37%	4,488	8.43%
2010	24,411	68.44%	11,258	31.56%	0	0.00%
2016	36,533	66.68%	15,107	27.57%	3,150	5.75%
2022	34,214	68.13%	14,763	29.40%	1,243	2.48%

Pennsylvania Gubernatorial election results for Blair County
Year	Republican		Democratic		Third party(ies)	
Year	No.	%	No.	%	No.	%
1970	17,125	45.28%	18,317	48.43%	2,381	6.30%
1974	23,216	58.46%	16,045	40.40%	455	1.15%
1978	20,976	52.40%	18,678	46.66%	378	0.94%
1982	23,180	57.35%	17,033	42.15%	202	0.50%
1986	17,509	53.02%	15,135	45.83%	380	1.15%
1990	9,698	31.89%	20,713	68.11%	0	0.00%
1994	17,734	51.54%	9,830	28.57%	6,846	19.90%
1998	19,025	67.54%	4,410	15.66%	4,734	16.81%
2002	23,530	68.15%	10,356	29.99%	643	1.86%
2006	23,295	60.15%	15,435	39.85%	0	0.00%
2010	26,199	72.88%	9,750	27.12%	0	0.00%
2014	17,718	58.06%	12,800	41.94%	0	0.00%
2018	28,175	64.74%	14,622	33.60%	725	1.67%
2022	31,823	63.22%	17,716	35.20%	795	1.58%

=== County commissioners ===
- David Kessling, chair, Republican
- Laura Burke, Vice-chair, Democrat
- Amy Webster, Secretary, Republican

=== Other county offices ===
- Clerk of Courts and Prothonotary, Robin Patton, Republican
- Controller, A.C. Stickel, Republican
- Coroner, Ray Benton, Republican
- District Attorney, Pete Weeks, Republican
- Register of Wills and Recorder of Deeds, Anita Terchanik, Republican
- Sheriff, James Ott, Republican
- Treasurer, James Carothers, Republican

=== Police agencies ===
- Allegheny Township Police
- Altoona City Police
- Altoona Area School District Police
- Amtrak Police Department
- Bellwood Borough Police
- Blair County District Attorneys Office
- Blair County Parole & Probation Office
- Blair County Sheriff's Office
- Blair Township Police
- Central Pennsylvania Humane Society Police
- Duncansville Borough Police
- Freedom Township Police
- Greenfield Township Police
- Hollidaysburg Borough Police
- Logan Township Police
- Martinsburg Borough Police
- Norfolk Southern Railroad Police
- North Woodbury Township Police
- Pennsylvania Department of Conservation and Natural Resources
- Pennsylvania Fish and Boat Commission
- Pennsylvania Game Commission
- Pennsylvania State Police
- Pennsylvania State University Altoona Police
- Roaring Spring Borough Police
- Spring Cove School District Police
- Tyrone Borough Police
- Tyrone Area School District Police
- United States Postal Inspection Service
- UPMC Altoona Hospital Police
- Van Zandt VA Hospital Police
- Williamsburg Borough Police

=== State senate ===
- Judy Ward, Republican, Pennsylvania's 30th Senatorial District

=== State House of Representatives ===
- Louis C. Schmitt Jr., Republican, Pennsylvania's 79th Representative District
- Scott Barger, Republican, Pennsylvania's 80th Representative District

=== United States House of Representatives ===
- John Joyce, Republican, Pennsylvania's 13th congressional district

=== United States Senate ===
- John Fetterman, Democrat
- David McCormick, Republican

=== Voter registration ===
Chart of Voter Registration
1. Republican (61.9%)
2. Democratic (25.4%)
3. Independent (9.12%)
4. Other Parties (3.61%)

As of April 23, 2025 there are 81,144 registered voters in Blair County.

- Republican: 50,735 (62.52%)
- Democratic: 19,699 (24.28%)
- Independent: 7,946 (9.79%)
- Third party: 2,764 (3.41%)

== Education ==
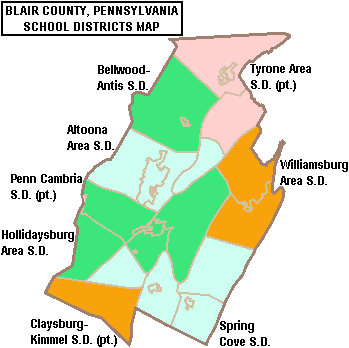
Map of Blair County, Pennsylvania School Districts

=== Colleges and universities ===
- Penn State Altoona

=== Community, junior and technical colleges ===
- South Hills School of Business and Technology
- YTI Career Institute
- Pennsylvania Highlands Community College

=== Public school districts ===
School districts include:

- Altoona Area School District
- Bellwood-Antis School District
- Claysburg-Kimmel School District (also in Bedford County)
- Hollidaysburg Area School District
- Penn Cambria School District (also in Cambria County)
- Spring Cove School District
- Tyrone Area School District (also in Centre and Huntingdon Counties)
- Williamsburg Community School District

=== Charter schools ===
- Agora Cyber Charter School
- Central Pennsylvania Digital Learning Foundation Charter School (K-12). Altoona.

=== Technology school ===
- Greater Altoona Career and Technology Center - Altoona

=== Private schools ===
- Alternative Education Program - Hollidaysburg
- Holy Trinity Middle School - Altoona
- Holy Trinity Elementary School - Altoona Campus
- Holy Trinity Elementary School - Hollidaysburg Campus
- Altoona Hospital School of Nursing
- Bishop Guilfoyle Catholic High School - Altoona
- Blair County Christian School - Duncansville
- Champion Life Christian Academy - Altoona
- Cove Lane Parochial School - Martinsburg
- Crawford Elementary at Adelphoi Village
- Emmanuel Baptist Christian School - Claysburg
- Faith Tabernacle School - Altoona
- Great Commission Schools - Altoona
- Harbor House Center Early Academy - Altoona
- Heritage Christian School - Martinsburg
- Hollidaysburg Catholic School - Hollidaysburg
- Living Water Christian Academy - Williamsburg
- Northwestern Human Services Autism School
- Penn Mont Academy - Hollidaysburg
- Penn Mont at Penn State Altoona
- Piney Creek Parochial School - New Enterprise
- Shady Grove School - Martinsburg
- Shady Pond School - Altoona
- St John Evangelist School - Altoona
- St Matthew School - Tyrone
- St Patrick School - Newry
- Sylvan Learning Center - Hollidaysburg
- Tender Love for Children - Altoona
- The Nehemiah Project - Altoona
- Training & Development Tech - Hollidaysburg
- White Oak School - Tyrone

Data taken from Pennsylvania EdNA - PDE database of public private schools 2012

=== Libraries ===
Blair County hosts a system of nine libraries that can be accessed with one library card. Resource sharing exists between the eight libraries. Books from any of the eight system libraries can be placed on hold and delivered to a patron's home library and then returned to any of the eight libraries in the system.

- Altoona Area Public Library - Altoona
- Bellwood Antis Public Library - Bellwood
- Blair County Library System - Altoona
- Claysburg Area Public Library - Claysburg
- Hollidaysburg Area Public Library - Hollidaysburg
- Martinsburg Community Library - Martinsburg
- Roaring Spring Community Library - Roaring Spring
- Tyrone-Snyder Twnshp Pub Library - Tyrone
- Williamsburg Public Library - Williamsburg

== Recreation ==
There is one Pennsylvania state park in Blair County, Canoe Creek State Park in Frankstown Township.

== Communities ==
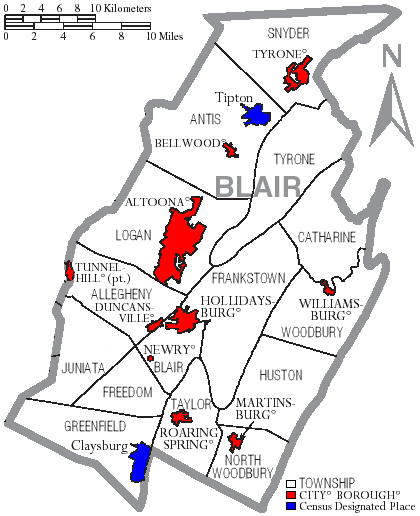
Map of Blair County, Pennsylvania, with municipal labels showing cities and boroughs (red), townships (white), and census-designated places (blue)

Under Pennsylvania law, there are four types of incorporated municipalities: cities, boroughs, townships, and, in at most two cases, towns. The following cities, boroughs and townships are located in Blair County:

=== City ===
- Altoona

=== Boroughs ===
- Bellwood
- Duncansville
- Hollidaysburg (county seat)
- Martinsburg
- Newry
- Roaring Spring
- Tunnelhill (mostly in Cambria County)
- Tyrone
- Williamsburg

=== Townships ===
- Allegheny
- Antis
- Blair
- Catharine
- Frankstown
- Freedom
- Greenfield
- Huston
- Juniata
- Logan
- North Woodbury
- Snyder
- Taylor
- Tyrone
- Woodbury

=== Census-designated places ===
Census-designated places are geographical areas designated by the U.S. Census Bureau for the purposes of compiling demographic data. They are unincorporated communities and not actual jurisdictions under Pennsylvania law.

- Bald Eagle
- Beavertown
- Blue Knob
- Brooks Mill
- Canan Station
- Canoe Creek
- Carson Valley
- Charlottsville
- Clappertown
- Claysburg
- Cotton Town
- Cove Forge
- Cross Keys
- Culp
- Curryville
- Dumb Hundred
- East Altoona
- East Freedom
- East Sharpsburg
- Elberta
- Eldorado
- Fisherville
- Foot of Ten
- Fort Fetter
- Fostoria
- Franklin Forge
- Frankstown
- Fredericksburg
- Friesville
- Ganister
- Geeseytown
- Gray
- Grazierville
- Greenwood
- Henrietta
- Homewood at Martinsburg
- Ironville
- Jugtown
- Juniata Gap
- Klahr
- Lakemont
- Larke
- Leamersville
- Linds Crossing
- Loop
- Martinsburg Junction
- McKee
- Mill Run
- Millerstown
- Moores Mill
- Nealmont
- Newburg
- Northwood
- Olivia
- Ore Hill
- Oreminea
- Penn Farms
- Pinecroft
- Point View
- Puzzletown
- Red Hill
- Reese
- Reightown
- Reservoir
- Robeson Extension
- Roots
- Royer
- Shelltown
- Shellytown
- Sickles Corner
- Skelp
- Ski Gap
- Smith Corner
- Spring Drive Mobile Home Park
- Sproul
- St. Clair
- Sunbrook
- Sylvan Hills
- Tipton
- Tyrone Forge
- Vail
- Vicksburg
- Wopsononock
- Yellow Springs

=== Population ranking ===
The population ranking of the following table is based on the 2020 census of Blair County. † county seat

Rank	City/Town/etc.	Population (2020 Census)	Municipal type	Incorporated
1	Altoona	42,989	City	1854 (borough) 1868 (city)
2	† Hollidaysburg	5,632	Borough	1836
3	Tyrone	5,095	Borough	1857
4	Greenwood	3,597	CDP	
5	Roaring Spring	2,399	Borough	1888
6	Martinsburg	1,858	Borough	1832
7	Lakemont	1,803	CDP	
8	Bellwood	1,751	Borough	1898
9	Claysburg	1,196	CDP	
10	Williamsburg	1,167	Borough	1827
11	Duncansville	1,148	Borough	1891
12	Grazierville	848	CDP	
13	Tipton	688	CDP	
14	East Freedom	578	CDP	
15	Foot of Ten	537	CDP	
16	Tunnelhill (mostly in Cambria County)	327	Borough	1876
17	Newry	307	Borough	1876
18	Northwood	124	CDP	

== See also ==
- National Register of Historic Places listings in Blair County, Pennsylvania
