= Lakemont, Pennsylvania =

Unincorporated community in Pennsylvania, US

- Census-designated place
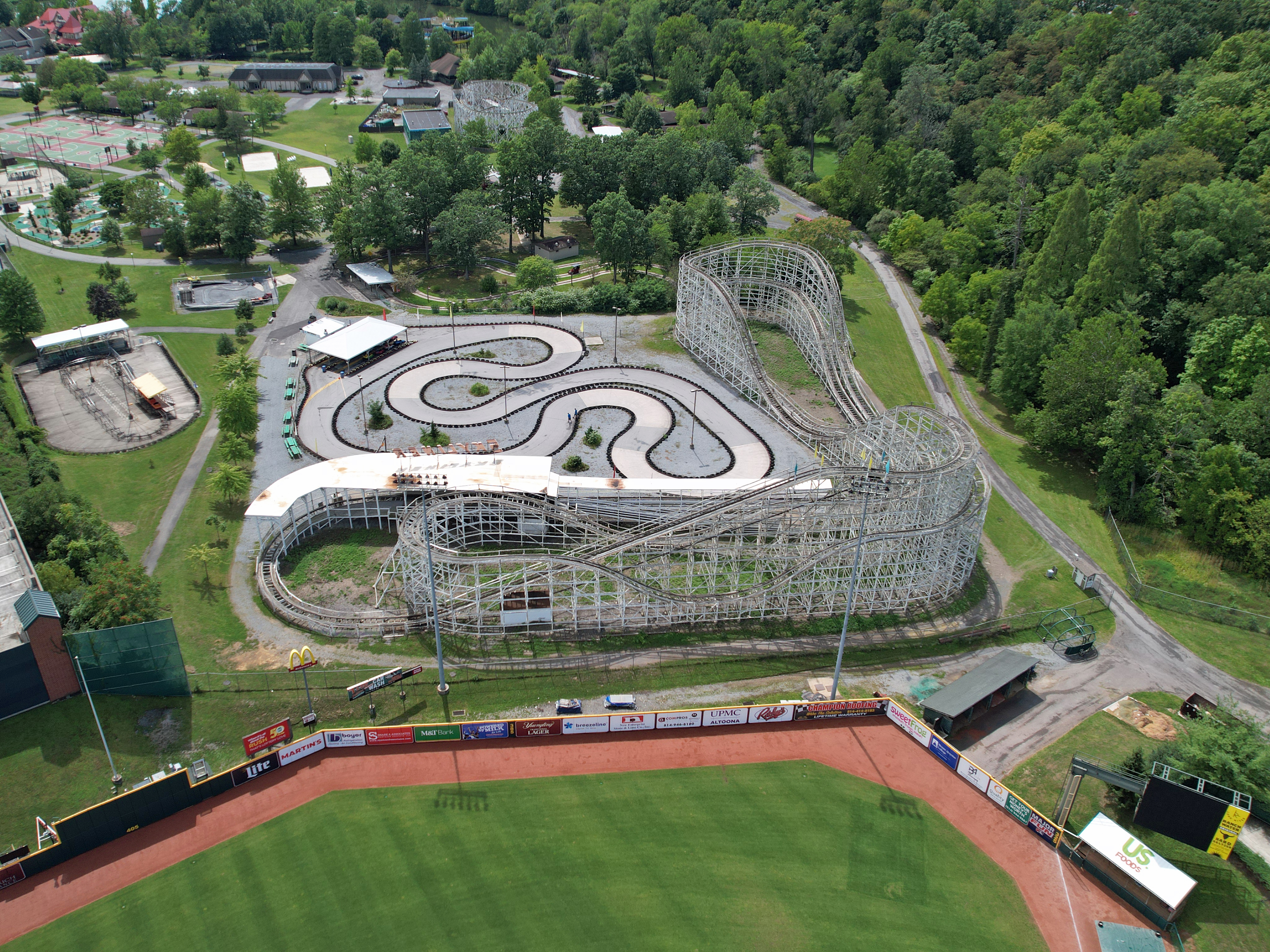
- Aerial view of Lakemont Park, featuring the Skyliner

- Location within Pennsylvania Location within the United States
- Coordinates: 40°27′51″N 78°23′32″W
- Country: United States
- State: Pennsylvania
- County: Blair
- Townships: Logan, Allegheny

Area
  - Total: 1.03 sq mi (2.68 km^{2})
  - Land: 1.02 sq mi (2.63 km^{2})
  - Water: 0.023 sq mi (0.06 km^{2})
- Elevation: 1,066 ft (325 m)

Population (2020)
  - Total: 1,773
  - Density: 1,749/sq mi (675.3/km^{2})
- Time zone: UTC-5 (Eastern (EST))
  - Summer (DST): UTC-4 (EDT)
- FIPS code: 42-40992
- GNIS feature ID: 2628809

Lakemont is a census-designated place in Allegheny and Logan Townships in Blair County, Pennsylvania, United States. It is located to the east of I-99 and is located between Altoona and Hollidaysburg. Lakemont is the location of Lakemont Park, although the address is generally Altoona and part of the "Lakemont" area actually lies within the Altoona city boundaries. As of the 2010 census, the population was 1,868 residents.

== Demographics ==
Historical population
| Census | Pop. | Note | %± |
|---|---|---|---|
| 2020 | 1,773 | | — |
U.S. Decennial Census

== Education ==
The school district for most of the CDP is Altoona Area School District. Altoona Area High School is the comprehensive high school for that district.

A portion of the CDP is in Hollidaysburg Area School District.
