= Ore Hill (restaurant) =

Restaurant in Kent, Connecticut, U.S.

- Interactive map of Ore Hill

Restaurant information
- Location: 3 Maple Street, Kent, Connecticut, 06757, United States
- Coordinates: 41°43′29″N 73°28′36″W

Ore Hill is a restaurant in Kent, Connecticut. Established in April 2023, the business was included in The New York Times's 2023 list of the 50 best restaurants in the United States.
