= Logan Township, Blair County, Pennsylvania =

Township in Pennsylvania, US

- Township
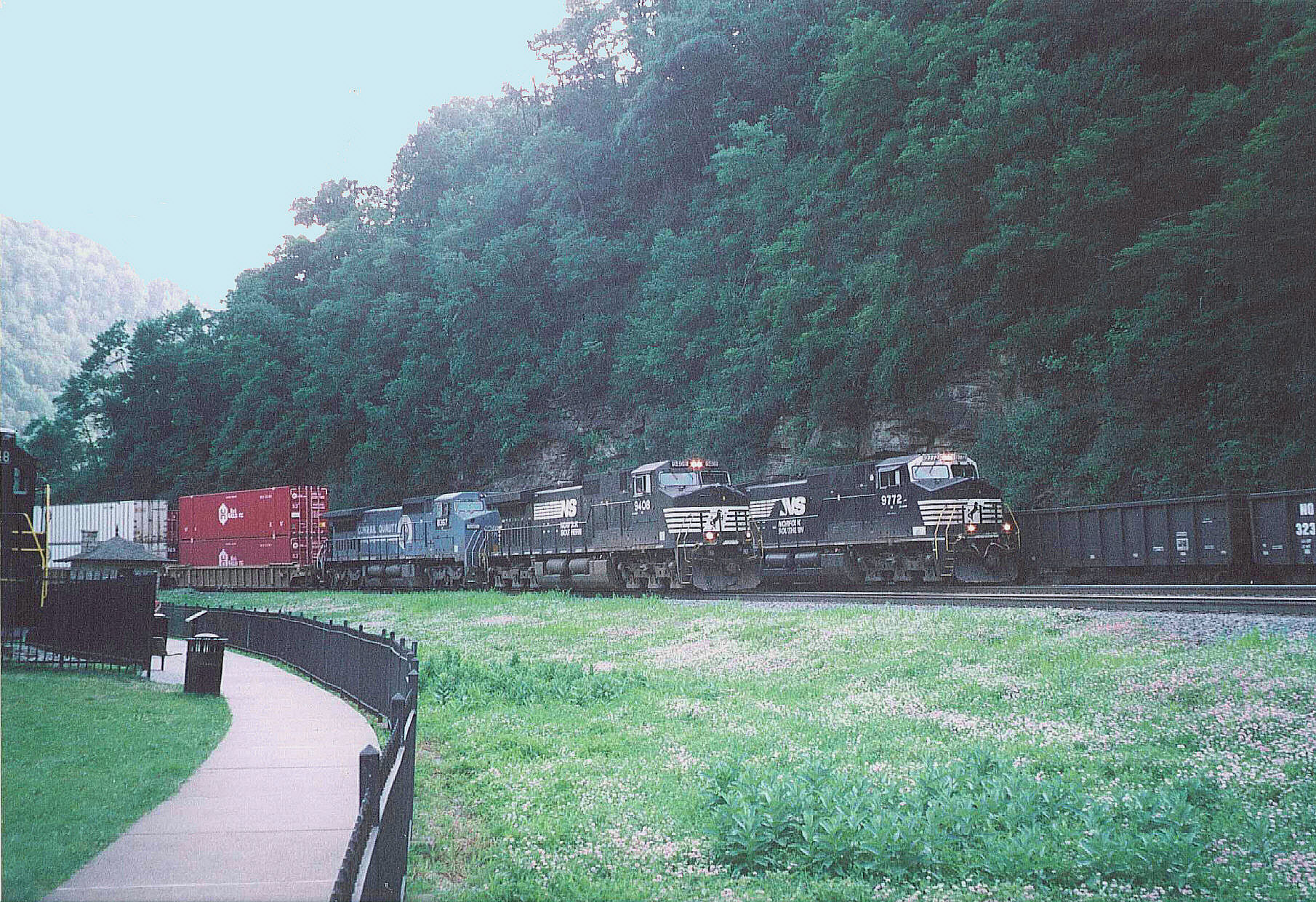
- Three trains passing on triple-track mainline of Norfolk Southern Railway at Horseshoe Curve in Logan Township

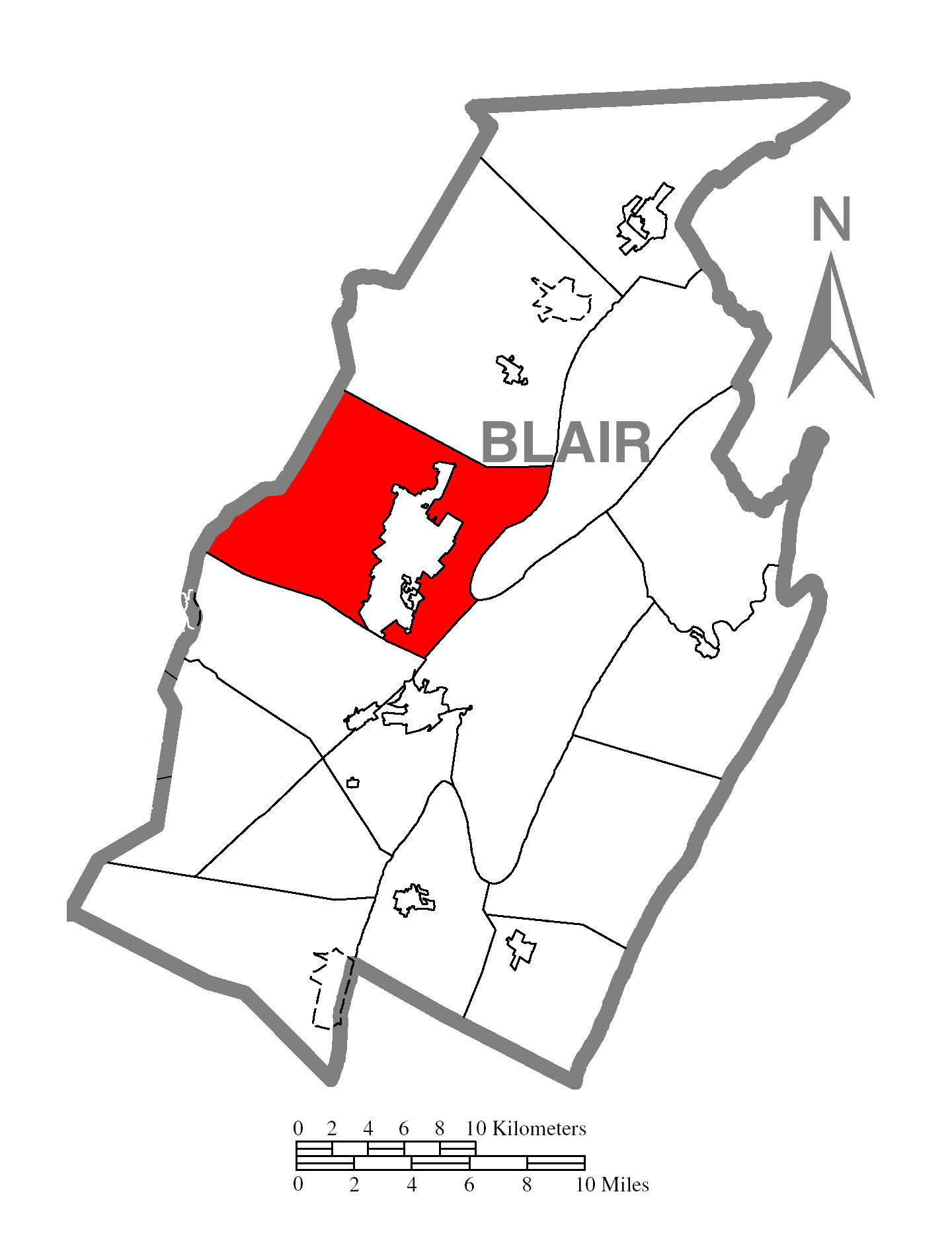
- Map of Blair County, Pennsylvania highlighting Logan Township

- Location of Logan Township in Pennsylvania
- Coordinates: 40°31′30″N 78°30′29″W
- Country: United States
- State: Pennsylvania
- County: Blair
- Settled: 1770
- Incorporated: 1850

Government
  - Type: Board of Supervisors

Area
  - Total: 46.84 sq mi (121.31 km^{2})
  - Land: 46.51 sq mi (120.46 km^{2})
  - Water: 0.33 sq mi (0.85 km^{2})

Population (2020)
  - Total: 12,404 ▼
  - Density: 270.1/sq mi (104.27/km^{2})
- Time zone: UTC-5 (Eastern (EST))
  - Summer (DST): UTC-4 (EDT)
- Area code: 814
- FIPS code: 42-013-44328
- Website: www.logantownship-pa.gov

Logan Township is a township in Blair County, Pennsylvania, United States. It is part of the Altoona, PA Metropolitan Statistical Area. It is the most populous township in Blair County, with a population of 12,413 as of 2020. Logan Township is home to Horseshoe Curve, a National Historic Landmark.

== General information ==
- ZIP codes: 16601, 16602, 16603
- Area code: 814
- Local telephone exchanges: 940, 941, 942, 943, 944, 946, 947, 949

== Geography ==
Logan Township is located in west-central Blair County and nearly encloses the city of Altoona. The Interstate 99/U.S. Route 220 freeway passes through Logan Township as it bypasses Altoona to the east, with access from Exits 31, 32, and 33. The township includes the unincorporated communities of Wopsononock, Juniata Gap, East Altoona, Greenwood, Red Hill, Newburg, Mill Run, Eldorado, and Lakemont.

Horseshoe Curve is located in the southwestern part of the township where the Norfolk Southern Railway's Pittsburgh Line climbs the Allegheny Front, a major escarpment at the edge of the Allegheny Mountains of central Pennsylvania.

According to the United States Census Bureau, the township has a total area of 46.7 square miles (121.0 km^{2}), of which 46.4 square miles (120.1 km^{2}) is land and 0.31 square miles (0.8 km^{2}), or 0.70%, is water.

== Demographics ==
Historical population
Census	Pop.	Note	%±
2000	11,925		—
2010	12,289		3.1%
2020	12,404		0.9%
U.S. Decennial Census

As of the census of 2010, there were 12,289 people, 4,875 households, and 3,111 families residing in the township. The population density was 262.4 inhabitants per square mile (101.3/km^{2}). There were 5,111 housing units at an average density of 109.1 per square mile (42.1/km^{2}). The racial makeup of the township was 96.6% White, 1.2% African American, 0.1% Native American, 0.9% Asian, 0.02% Pacific Islander, 0.2% from other races, and 0.8% from two or more races. Hispanic or Latino of any race were 0.9% of the population.

There were 4,875 households, out of which 36.4% had children under the age of 18 living with them, 63.8% were married couples living together, 9.1% had a female householder with no husband present, and 36.2% were non-families. 25.4% of all households were made up of individuals, and 16.4% had someone living alone who was 65 years of age or older. The average household size was 2.42 and the average family size was 2.8.

In the township the population was spread out, with 16.3% under the age of 18, 18.5% from 18 to 24, 19.0% from 25 to 44, 29.7% from 45 to 64, and 16.4% who were 65 years of age or older. The median age was 41.5 years. For every 100 females, there were 96.8 males. For every 100 females age 18 and over, there were 95.6 males.

The median income for a household in the township was $36,993, and the median income for a family was $48,943. Males had a median income of $45,988 versus $32,051 for females. The per capita income for the township was $26,033. About 6.6% of families and 14.1% of the population were below the poverty line, including 14.9% of those under age 18 and 7.5% of those age 65 or over.
