= Pennsylvania Route 26 =

State highway in Pennsylvania, US

Pennsylvania Route 26

Route information
- Maintained by PennDOT
- Length: 125.492 mi (201.960 km)
- Existed: 1928–present

Major junctions
- South end: North Orleans Road at the Maryland state line
- US 30 Bus. in Everett; US 30 near Everett; US 22 in Huntingdon; US 322 Bus. in State College; US 322 near State College; I-99 / US 220 / PA 64 near Bellefonte; I-80 / Future I-99 / US 220 near Bellefonte
- North end: PA 150 / SR 1001 near Howard

Location
- Country: United States
- State: Pennsylvania
- Counties: Fulton, Bedford, Huntingdon, Centre

Highway system
- Pennsylvania State Route System; Interstate; US; State; Scenic; Legislative
← PA 25	→ PA 27

Pennsylvania Route 26 (PA 26) is a 125.5-mile (202.0 km) highway in the south-central area of Pennsylvania. Its northern terminus is at PA 150 northwest of Howard; its southern terminus is at the Maryland state line near Barnes Gap in Union Township. Two major destinations along this route are Raystown Lake near Huntingdon and the Pennsylvania State University at State College.

In State College, the road divides into a one-way pair, going northbound on Beaver Avenue and going southbound on College Avenue. The Centre Area Transportation Authority uses these two routes for their Campus Loop and the Town Loop.

As of February 22,2025, a 3.6-mile (5.8 km) portion of PA 26 is concurrent with the northernmost stretch of Interstate 99 (I-99) north of State College between Pleasant Gap and south of I-80. The route also passes by two state penitentiaries: the State Correctional Institution – Rockview in Pleasant Gap and State Correctional Institution – Huntingdon, near Huntingdon.

== Route description ==
=== Fulton and Bedford counties ===
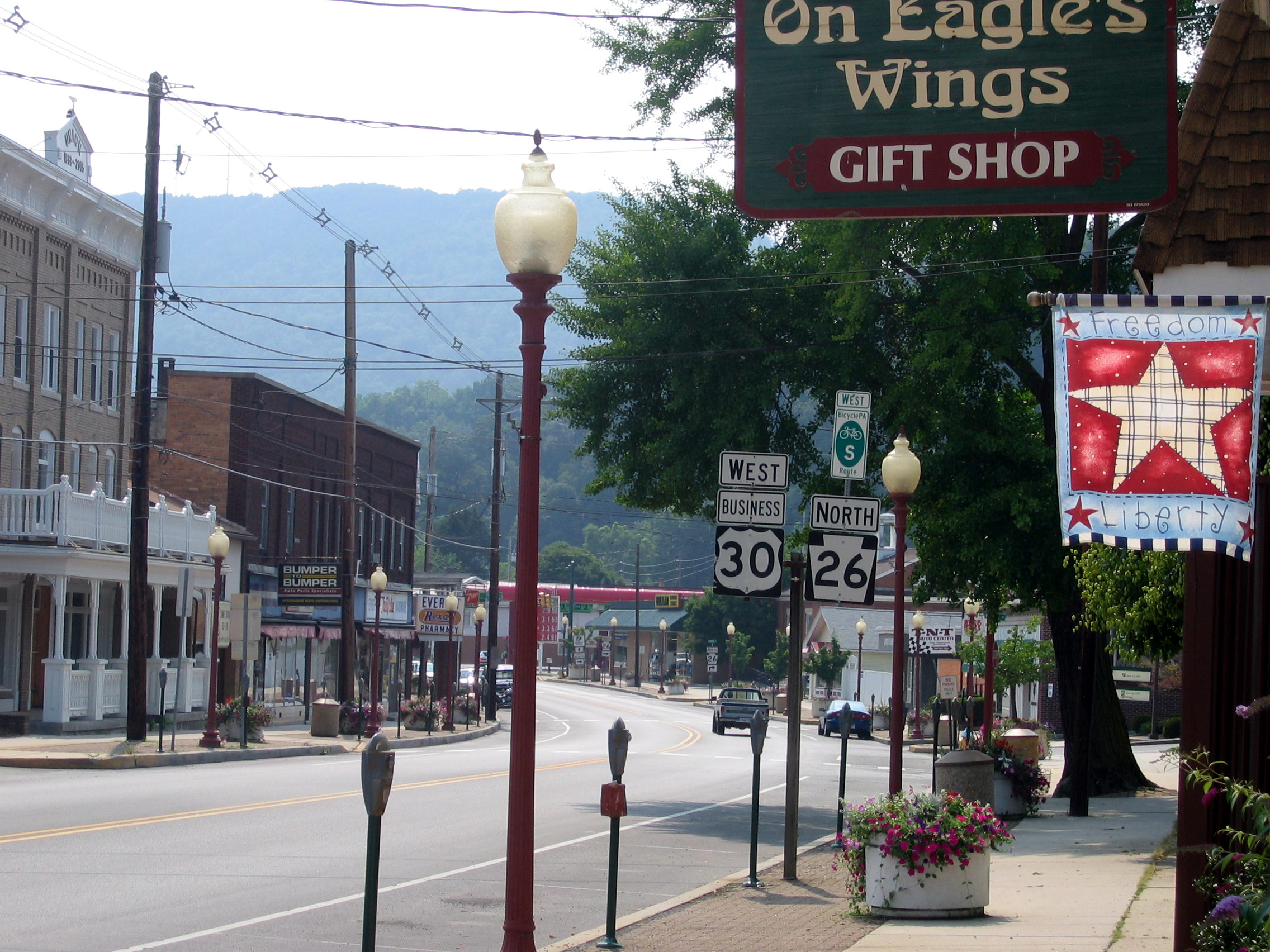
PA 26 northbound concurrent with US 30 Bus. westbound on Main Street in Everett

PA 26 begins at the Maryland state line (Mason–Dixon line) in Union Township, Fulton County, where the road continues south into that state as North Orleans Road. From the state line, the route heads north on two-lane undivided South Clear Ridge Road through forested areas with some farm fields. PA 26 comes to an intersection with the western terminus of PA 484, where it makes a turn to the west. PA 26 enters Mann Township in Bedford County as Clear Ridge Road, heading northwest through woodland with some fields. The road curves north and winds through more rural land before making two sharp turns; first towards the west and second towards the north. The route winds north through forests, running through the community of Piney Creek. PA 26 passes through tracts of Buchanan State Forest, turning to the northwest. The route crosses into Southampton Township and reaches Millers Corner, where it turns northeast to remain along Clear Ridge Road. The route enters Monroe Township and leaves the state forest, continuing northeast through a mix of farmland and woodland. PA 26 makes an S-curve as it winds through rural land, passing through the communities of Five Forks and Chapmans Run. Farther north, the road reaches the residential community of Clearville, where it turns to the northwest. The route runs through farm fields with some woods, turning to the northeast. PA 26 continues north-northeast through a mix of farms and wooded areas, crossing into West Providence Township. The road passes through more rural land before heading northwest through more developed areas and passing under I-70/I-76 (Pennsylvania Turnpike). Following this, the route heads into the community of Earlston, where it passes homes. In Earlston, PA 26 heads west as East 4th Avenue before it makes a turn north onto State Street.

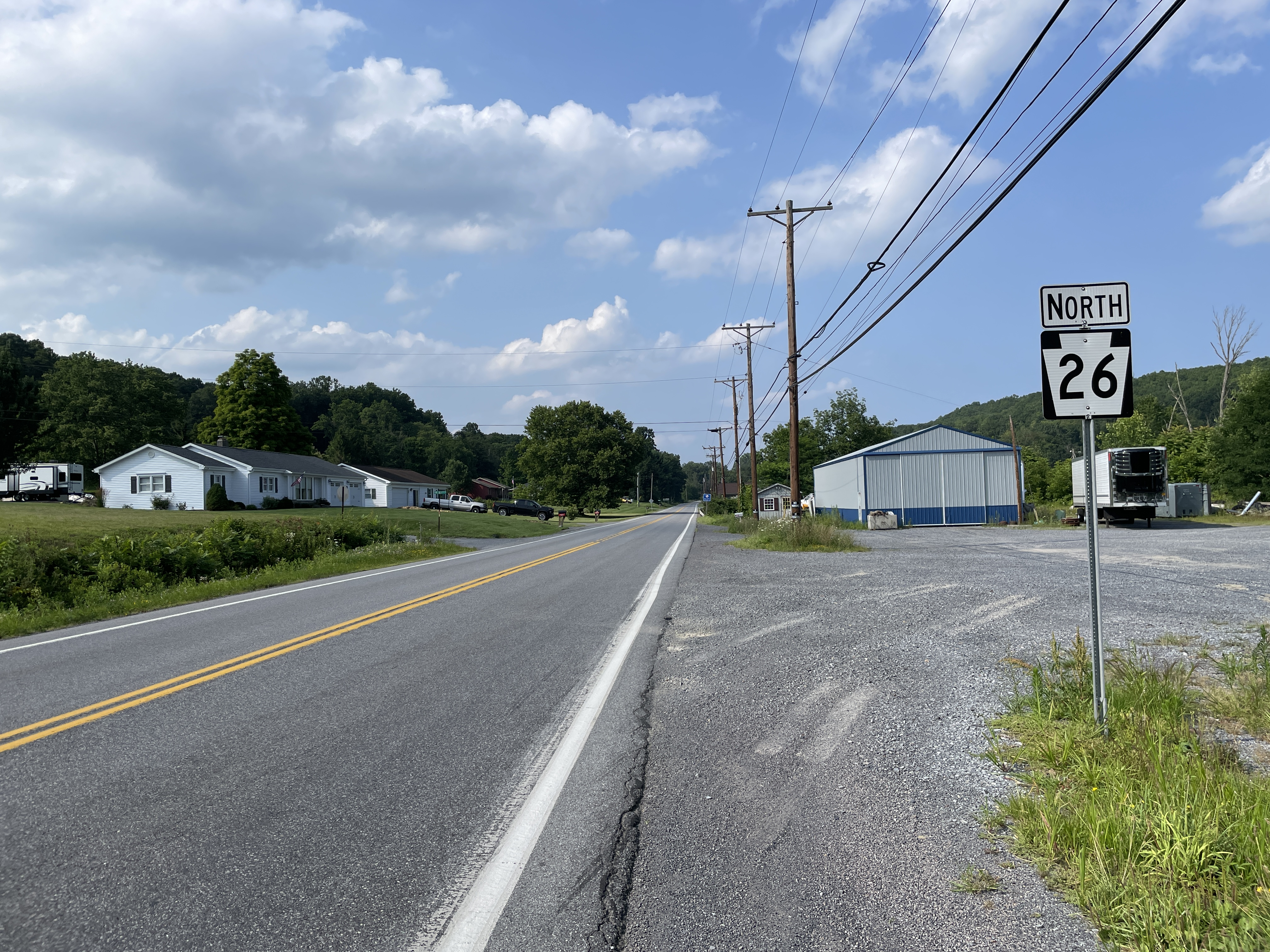
PA 26 northbound in Hopewell Township

The route curves northwest and crosses the Raystown Branch Juniata River into the borough of Everett, where it becomes South Hopewell Street. PA 26 runs through commercial areas and comes to an intersection with US 30 Bus., where it turns west to form a concurrency with that route on East Main Street. The two routes head west through the commercial downtown of Everett, curving to the southwest. PA 26 splits from US 30 Bus. by turning north-northwest onto North Spring Street. The route bends north and passes through residential areas. PA 26 passes under the US 30 freeway, at which point it leaves Everett for West Providence Township and becomes Raystown Road, passing through developed areas a short distance to the east of Tussey Mountain. The road curves north-northeast and comes to an intersection with Bud Shuster Bypass, which heads south to an interchange with the US 30 freeway. Here, the route turns north to remain along Raystown Road and crosses into Hopewell Township, passing a mix of homes and businesses in a narrow valley between Tussey Mountain to the west and Warrior Ridge to the east. The road continues north-northeast through a mix of farmland, woodland, and residences in the valley. Farther north, the valley gets wider as Warrior Ridge heads further to the east, and PA 26 continues north through agricultural areas with some woods and homes. The route turns east and comes to an intersection with the southern terminus of PA 36 before it curves to the southeast. The road passes through the residential community of Yellow Creek, where it crosses Yellow Creek. From here, PA 26 heads east through farmland with some woods, turning northeast and winding along. The route passes through the community of Eichelbergertown and turns east, winding through wooded areas with some fields and homes a short distance to the north of Yellow Creek.

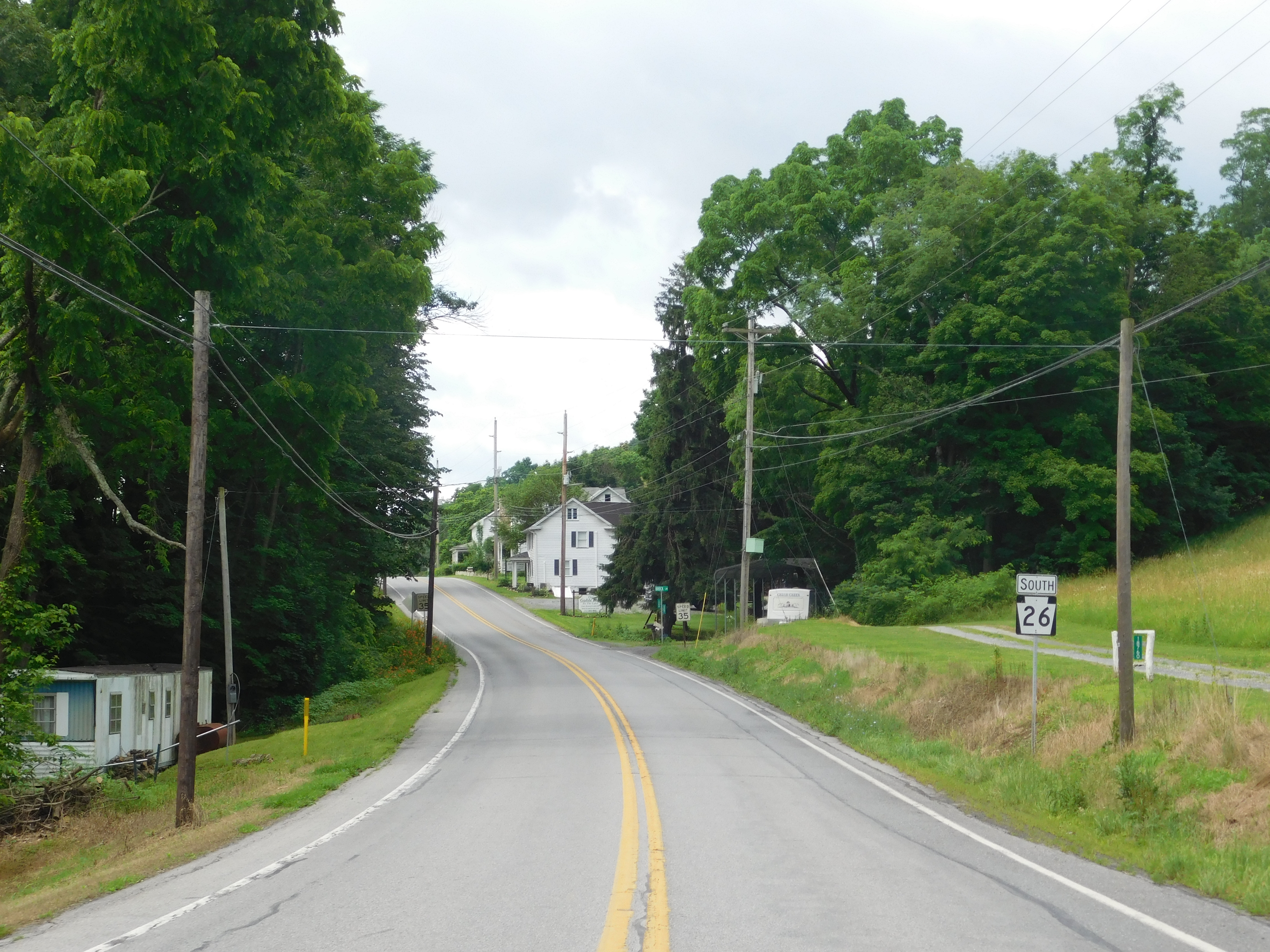
PA 26 southbound in Bedford County

The road passes through a gap in River Mountain and crosses into Broad Top Township. Here, PA 26 intersects the northern terminus of PA 915, which crosses the Raystown Branch Juniata River into the borough of Hopewell. Past this intersection, the route turns north and runs through forested areas between River Mountain to the west and the Raystown Branch Juniata River to the east. The road enters Liberty Township and continues north-northeast through forests alongside the river before the road and river turn to the northwest. PA 26 passes through farmland before it makes a turn to the north and runs through wooded areas further west of the Raystown Branch Juniata River. The route comes to an intersection with the western terminus of PA 913 and makes a turn west to remain along Raystown Road. The road curves north and passes through a mix of farmland and woodland with some homes in the Woodcock Valley, which is situated between Tussey Mountain to the west and Piney Ridge to the east. PA 26 curves north-northeast and continues through rural areas in the valley, passing east of the Captain Phillips Ranger Memorial before coming to an intersection with the southern terminus of PA 164.

=== Huntingdon County ===
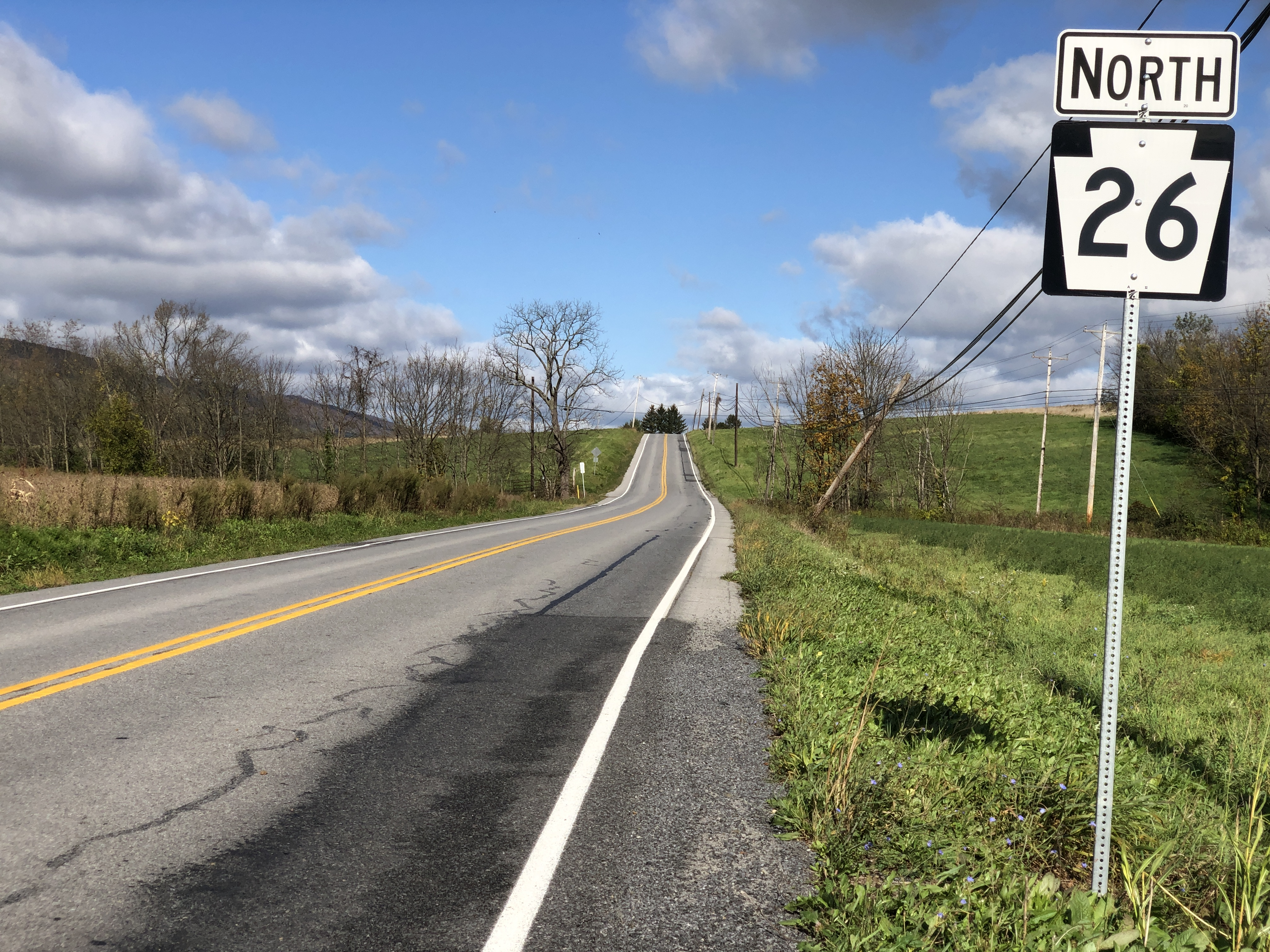
PA 26 northbound in Lincoln Township

PA 26 enters Hopewell Township in Huntingdon County and continues northeast as Raystown Road through farmland and woodland with some homes in the Woodcock Valley between Tussey Mountain to the west and Piney Ridge to the east, with Raystown Lake situated further to the east. The road passes through the communities of Cherrytown and Russellville before it crosses into Lincoln Township and intersects the western terminus of PA 994. Past this intersection, the route heads through agricultural areas with some woods and residences. PA 26 enters the borough of Marklesburg, where it is lined with homes. The road leaves Marklesburg for Penn Township and heads northeast through farmland with some wooded areas and residences. The route continues through rural land and crosses into Walker Township, where it makes an S-curve east and comes to the community of McConnellstown. Here, PA 26 curves northeast and runs through residential areas. The road continues through developed areas with some rural land and enters Smithfield Township. The route heads into business areas and gains a center left-turn lane briefly before becoming a divided highway for a short distance. PA 26 becomes undivided as it comes to an interchange with US 22 consisting of a two-way quadrant ramp on the northeast side. Following this interchange, the route becomes Pennsylvania Avenue and curves to the east-southeast, passing between State Correctional Institution – Huntingdon to the north and residential areas to the south. The road heads southeast into the community of Smithfield and heads southeast between the Juniata River to the northeast and homes to the southwest. PA 26 turns northeast onto Penn Street and crosses the Juniata River into the borough of Huntingdon. Here, the road becomes a divided highway and curves east, passing under Norfolk Southern's Pittsburgh Line. The route becomes undivided again and heads east-southeast through the residential and commercial downtown of Huntingdon, passing south of the Huntingdon County Courthouse. PA 26 turns north-northeast onto 2nd Street and passes homes, soon turning east onto Standing Stone Avenue and curving northeast past more development.

PA 26 leaves Huntingdon for Oneida Township and becomes Standing Stone Road, heading through a mix of farmland and woodland with some homes a short distance west of Standing Stone Creek. The road winds through more forested areas and curves north to cross the creek before passing east of a golf course. The route turns northeast and then north as it runs through wooded areas with some residences, passing through the community of Center Union. PA 26 continues through forests with some farm fields and development, curving northeast and crossing the Standing Stone Creek again. The road runs through more rural land and passes through the community of Donation before it enters Miller Township. The route continues northeast through woodland and farmland with some homes, with the Standing Stone Creek becoming closely parallel to the southeast before the route heads through the community of Jackson Center. PA 26 curves north alongside the creek into forested areas. The road winds north through a mix of farmland and woodland, crossing into Jackson Township. The route turns northeast and heads through agricultural areas, reaching an intersection with PA 305 in the community of Ennisville. Here, PA 26 turns east to form a concurrency with PA 305 on Greenwood Road, crossing the Standing Stone Creek and running through more rural areas with some homes. PA 305 splits from PA 26 in McAlevys Fort by turning to the southeast, while PA 26 turns north as McAlevys Fort Road and crosses the Standing Stone Creek again. The road curves northwest and passes through farmland before it heads into forested areas with some homes. The route passes southwest of Whipple Dam State Park before it crosses into Barree Township. At this point, PA 26 begins to ascend Tussey Mountain and heads into Rothrock State Forest, following a winding path and turning northwest and then northeast as it climbs the mountain.

=== Centre County ===
PA 26 one-way pair in State College

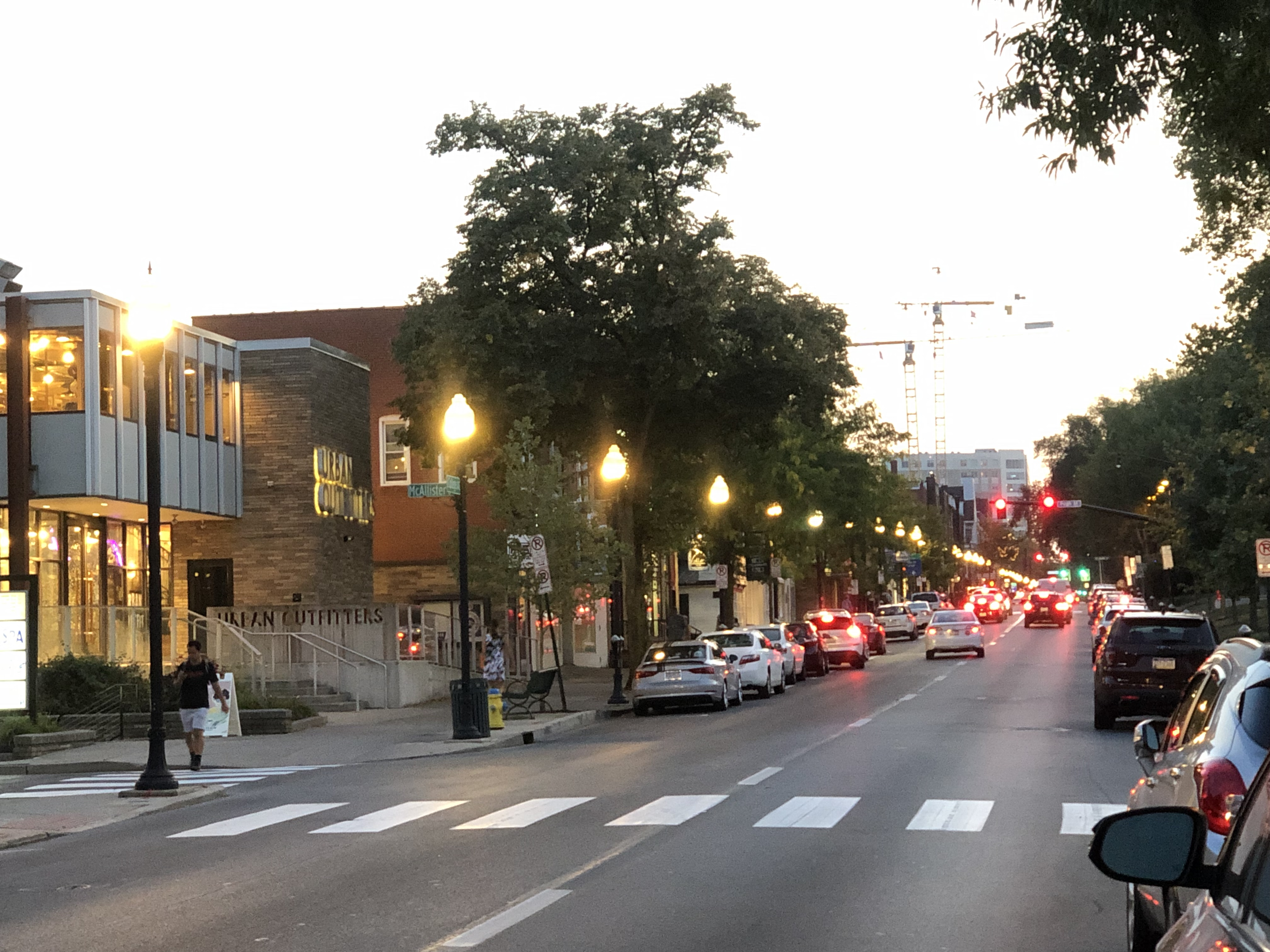
Southbound on College Avenue

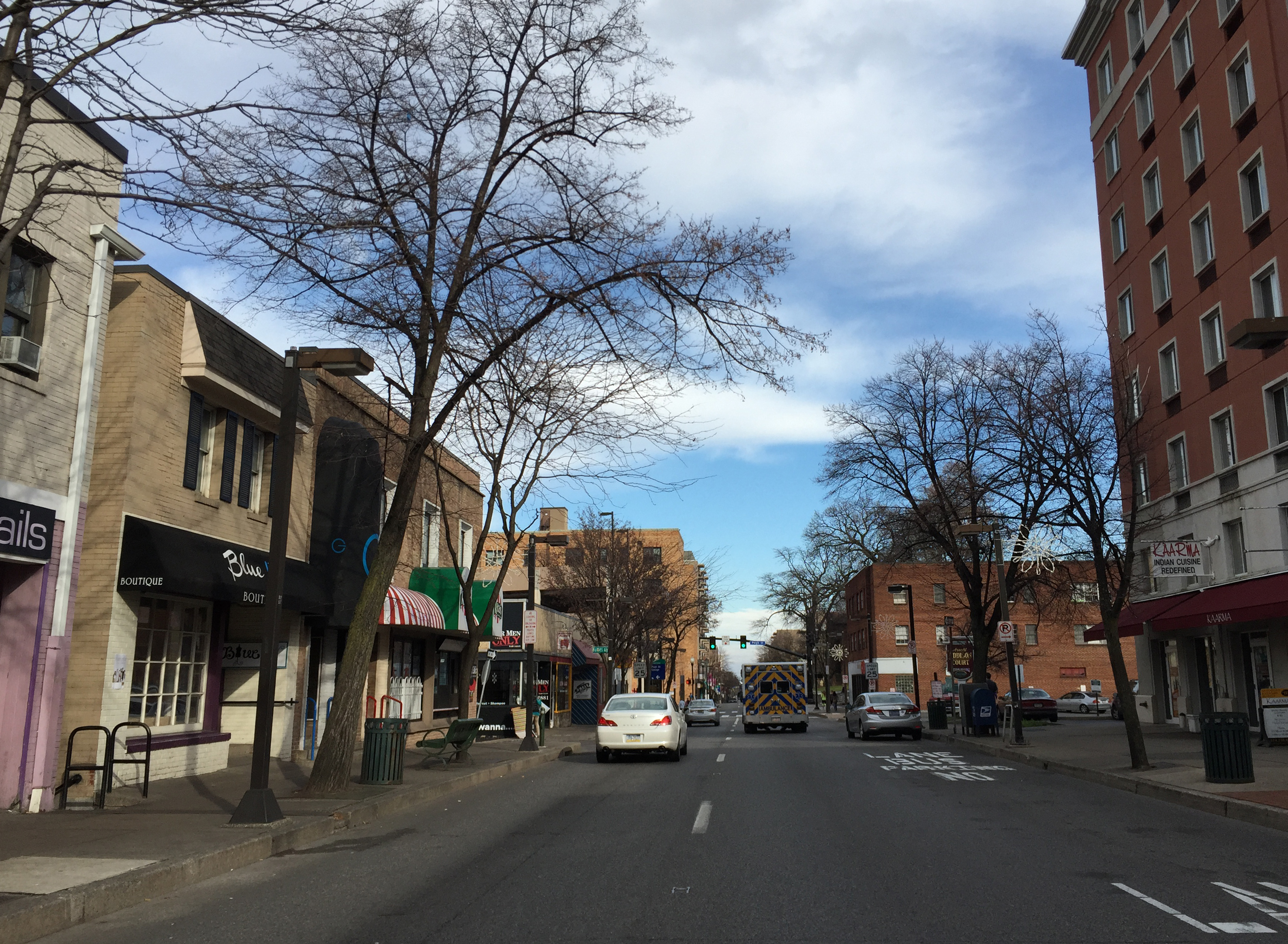
Northbound on Beaver Avenue

At the summit of Tussey Mountain, PA 26 comes to a truck brake check station in both directions and a scenic overlook on the southbound side, entering Ferguson Township in Centre County. The road begins to descend the mountain, coming to a northbound runaway truck ramp before it leaves Rothrock State Forest and makes a hairpin turn to the southwest. The route turns north and reaches the base of the mountain, where it enters the Nittany Valley and heads into the residential community of Pine Grove Mills as South Water Street. PA 26 comes to an intersection with PA 45, at which point it turns east to form a concurrency with that route on East Pine Grove Road. The road soon curves northeast and passes more homes along with a few businesses. The roadway leaves Pine Grove Mills and PA 45 splits from PA 26 by turning to the northeast. PA 26 becomes West College Avenue and curves north and then northwest, heading through farmland with some residences and commercial establishments and gaining a center left-turn lane. The road heads past a mix of homes and businesses, curving north and then northeast.

PA 26 enters the borough of State College, where it splits into the one-way pair of West Beaver Avenue northbound and West College Avenue southbound upon intersecting South Buckhout Street. The one-way pair, which carries two lanes in each direction, passes through residential areas. The route heads into the downtown area of State College, which contains businesses and high-rise buildings consisting of mixed residential and commercial uses. Here, PA 26 comes to an intersection with US 322 Bus., at which point West College Avenue becomes the southeast border of the University Park campus of Pennsylvania State University. Following this intersection, the one-way pair continues northeast through the downtown area to the southeast of the university campus. At the intersection with Allen Street to the southeast of Old Main on the Pennsylvania State University campus, the route becomes East Beaver Avenue northbound and East College Avenue southbound. PA 26 heads through more of downtown State College, with the university campus to the northwest, before the one-way pair ends at the High Street intersection. At this point, PA 26 continues northeast on four-lane undivided East College Avenue and comes to a partial cloverleaf interchange with University Drive that serves the University Park campus of Pennsylvania State University, including Beaver Stadium and the Bryce Jordan Center. Past this interchange, the road heads through woods and leaves State College for College Township, where it gains a center left-turn lane and passes through a mix of homes and businesses, running through the community of Millbrook. The route becomes a four-lane divided highway and reaches a diamond interchange with the US 322 freeway, where the route becomes concurrent with PA 144 Truck.

PA 26 northbound past University Drive in State College

Past the US 322 interchange, PA 26 becomes a five-lane road with a center left-turn lane and runs through wooded residential areas. Farther northeast, the route heads into business areas and becomes parallel with a Nittany and Bald Eagle Railroad line to the southeast of the road. PA 26 comes to an intersection with the southern terminus of PA 150, where it turns northeast to remain along East College Avenue, a three-lane road with a center left-turn lane that continues to parallel the railroad line. The road passes southeast of the Nittany Mall before it heads between residential areas to the northwest and industrial areas to the southeast. The route narrows to two lanes as it heads into a mix of farmland and woodland and enters Benner Township, where it passes southeast of State Correctional Institution – Rockview. PA 26 crosses the Nittany and Bald Eagle Railroad line and continues northeast through rural areas with some development as West College Avenue, gaining a center left-turn lane. The road crosses into Spring Township and heads into the community of Pleasant Gap, where it becomes two lanes again and passes through residential areas with some businesses. The route comes to an intersection with PA 144, where PA 144 Truck ends, and becomes East College Avenue, heading past more development. The road leaves Pleasant Gap and runs through a mix of farmland and commercial development, crossing a Nittany and Bald Eagle Railroad spur.

PA 26 comes to an intersection with the southern terminus of PA 64, where PA 64 continues northeast along East College Avenue and PA 26 turns north onto a two-lane expressway. The route heads northwest through agricultural areas and passes over a Nittany and Bald Eagle Railroad spur before it comes to a directional T interchange with I-99/US 220. At this point, PA 26 heads north along with I-99/US 220 on a four-lane freeway, passing north-northwest through farmland and coming to a partial cloverleaf interchange with PA 550 to the east of the borough of Bellefonte. The freeway continues through rural land and curves northeast before it ends, where I-99 ends and US 220 and PA 26 continue northeast at-grade along a four-lane divided highway. The road comes to an interchange with I-80 and the northern terminus of US 220 Alt., at which point US 220 splits from PA 26 by heading east along I-80. At this interchange, PA 26 enters Marion Township and continues northeast along two-lane undivided Jacksonville Road, passing through farmland with some woods and homes in a valley between Bald Eagle Mountain to the northwest and a ridge to the southeast, with I-80/US 220 running parallel to the southeast within the valley. Along this stretch, the roadway comes to an interchange with I-80/US 220. The route continues northeast through rural land before it turns northwest onto Walnut Street, where it heads into forested areas and winds to the north as it passes through a gap in Bald Eagle Mountain, crossing into Howard Township. The road curves northwest and enters the borough of Howard, where it passes through residential areas and comes to a bridge over a Nittany and Bald Eagle Railroad line. The route continues past more homes and some businesses before it leaves Howard for Howard Township again, heading into Bald Eagle State Park and crossing over the Foster Joseph Sayers Reservoir. PA 26 continues northwest and comes to its northern terminus at an intersection with PA 150.

== Major intersections ==
County	Location	mi	km	Exit	Destinations	Notes
Fulton	Union Township	0.000	0.000		North Orleans Road	Continuation into Maryland
Fulton	Union Township	1.361– 1.378	2.190– 2.218		PA 484 east (Buck Valley Road) – Warfordsburg	Western terminus of PA 484
Bedford	Everett	25.136	40.452		US 30 Bus. east (East Main Street) – Breezewood	Southern end of US 30 Bus. concurrency
Bedford	Everett	25.300	40.716		US 30 Bus. west (West Main Street) – Bedford	Northern end of US 30 Bus. concurrency
Bedford	West Providence Township	28.245	45.456		SR 1007 (Bud Shuster Bypass) to US 30 – Bedford, Breezewood	
Bedford	Hopewell Township	34.415	55.386		PA 36 north (Woodbury Pike) – Roaring Spring, Altoona	Southern terminus of PA 36
Bedford	Hopewell–Broad Top township line	39.327	63.291		PA 915 south (Front Street) – Hopewell	Northern terminus of PA 915
Bedford	Liberty Township	45.863	73.809		PA 913 east (Saxton Road) – Saxton	Western terminus of PA 913
Bedford	Liberty Township	49.495	79.654		PA 164 north (Cove Mountain Road) – Martinsburg	Southern terminus of PA 164
Huntingdon	Lincoln Township	54.471	87.663		PA 994 east (Old Plank Road) – Entriken	Western terminus of PA 994
Huntingdon	Smithfield Township	68.899– 69.059	110.882– 111.140		US 22 – Hollidaysburg, Mount Union	Interchange
Huntingdon	Jackson Township	86.144– 86.182	138.635– 138.696		PA 305 west (Greenwood Road) – Alexandria	Southern end of PA 305 concurrency
Huntingdon	Jackson Township	87.202– 87.234	140.338– 140.390		PA 305 east (Greenwood Road) – Belleville	Northern end of PA 305 concurrency
Centre	Ferguson Township	96.491	155.287		PA 45 west (Pine Grove Road) – Water Street	Southern end of PA 45 concurrency
Centre	Ferguson Township	97.796– 97.850	157.387– 157.474		PA 45 east (Shingletown Road) – Boalsburg	Northern end of PA 45 concurrency
Centre	State College	101.671	163.624		US 322 Bus. (Atherton Street) – Philipsburg, Lewistown	
Centre	State College	102.720– 102.895	165.312– 165.593		University Drive – Penn State University	Interchange
Centre	College Township	104.120– 104.207	167.565– 167.705		US 322 / PA 144 Truck south (Mount Nittany Expressway) to I-80 / I-99 / US 220 – Penn State University, Philipsburg, Lewistown	Interchange; southern end of PA 144 Truck concurrency; Penn State University not signed northbound
Centre	College Township	105.870	170.381		PA 150 north (Benner Pike) to I-80 / I-99 / US 220 – Bellefonte	Southern terminus of PA 150
Centre	Spring Township	109.996	177.021		PA 144 (Main Street) – Bellefonte, Lewistown PA 144 Truck ends	Northern end of PA 144 Truck concurrency
Centre	Spring Township	111.622	179.638		PA 64 north (East College Avenue) – Zion	Southern terminus of PA 64
Centre	Spring Township	111.622	179.638	Southern end of freeway section		
Centre	Spring Township	112.297– 112.610	180.725– 181.228	81	I-99 south / US 220 south – State College	Southern end of I-99/US 220 concurrency; exit number not signed northbound
Centre	Spring Township	114.060– 114.480	183.562– 184.238	83	PA 550 – Bellefonte, Zion	
Centre	Spring Township	116.034	186.739	Northern end of freeway section I-99 ends		
Centre	Spring–Marion township line	116.389– 116.987	187.310– 188.272		I-80 (US 220 Alt. south) / Future I-99 north / US 220 north – Williamsport, Dubois	Northern end of US 220 concurrency; exit 161 on I-80
Centre	Marion Township	119.547	192.392		To I-80 / US 220 – Lock Haven, Bellefonte	Access via Walt Road
Centre	Howard Township	125.492	201.960		PA 150 (North Eagle Valley Road) – Milesburg, Lock Haven, Romoia	Northern terminus
1.000 mi = 1.609 km; 1.000 km = 0.621 mi: Concurrency terminus

== PA 26 Truck ==
=== Huntingdon County ===
Pennsylvania Route 26 Truck
- Location: Huntingdon County
- Existed: 2013–2021

There were 2 truck routes of PA 26 in Huntingdon County. The first bypassed a weight-restricted bridge over Muddy Run in Huntingdon borough on which trucks over 36 tons and combination loads over 37 tons were prohibited. The second bypassed a weight-restricted bridge over Murray Run on which trucks over 35 tons and combination loads over 40 tons were prohibited. They were both created and established in September 2013. However, both bridges' weight restrictions were removed as late as 2021, and both routes have been removed.

=== Centre County ===
Pennsylvania Route 26 Truck
- Location: Centre County
- Existed: 2013–2021

The truck route in Centre County bypassed a weight-restricted bridge over Lick Run on which trucks over 36 tons and combination loads over 40 tons were prohibited. It followed I-80, US 220 Alt, and PA 150 and was signed in 2013, and was still signed as such as recently as 2018. However, as of 2021, no bridge carrying PA 26 over Lick Run has weight restrictions, and so the route was likely removed.
