= Pennsylvania Railroad Bridge over Shavers Creek =

- U.S. National Register of Historic Places
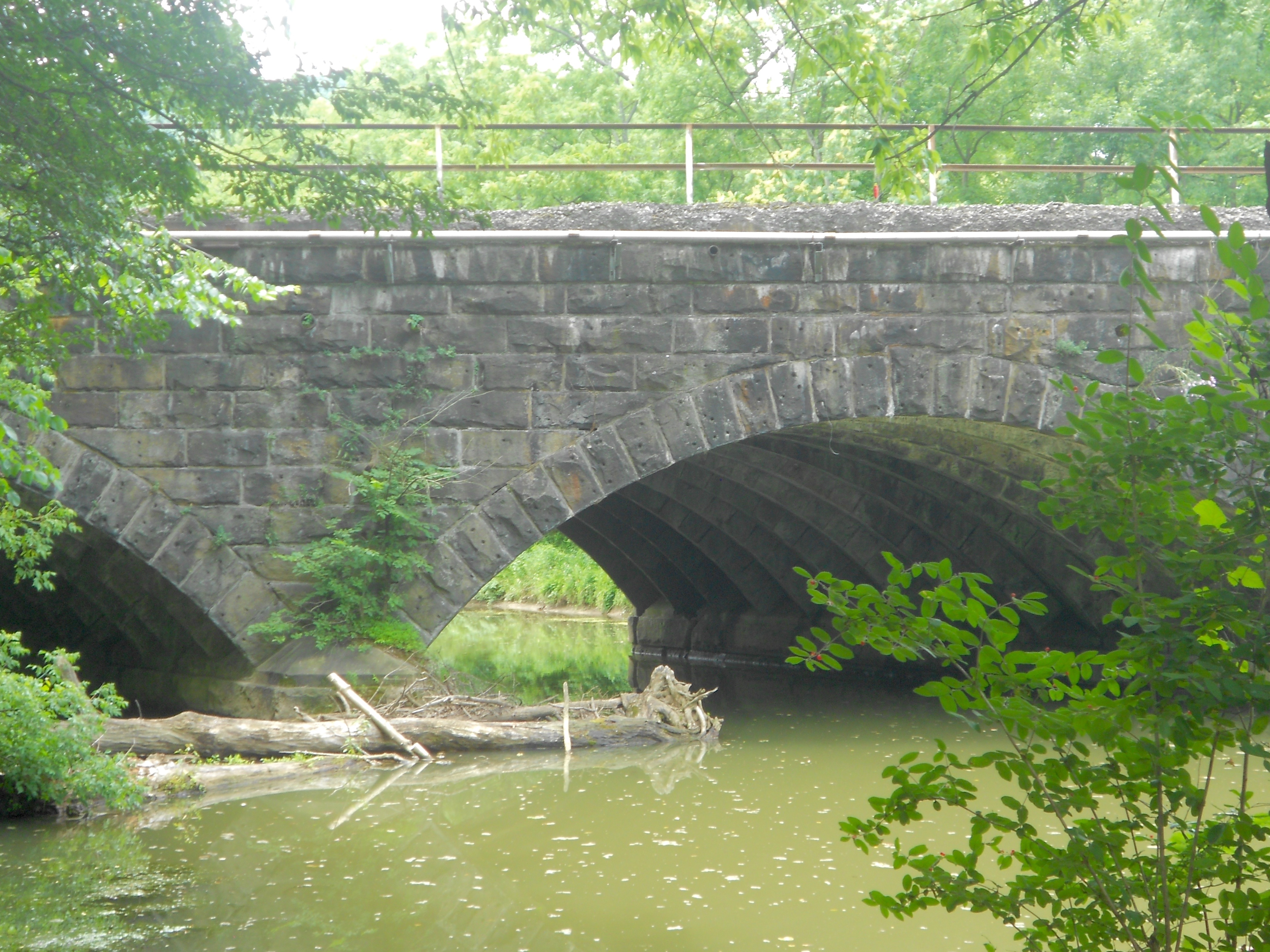

- Location within Pennsylvania Location within the United States
- Location: Over Shavers Creek near confluence with Juniata River, Logan Township and Petersburg, Huntingdon County, Pennsylvania
- Coordinates: 40°34′1″N 78°2′54″W
- Area: less than one acre
- Built: 1889
- Built by: Pennsylvania Railroad
- Architectural style: Stone arch bridge
- MPS: Industrial Resources of Huntingdon County, 1780-1939 MPS
- NRHP reference No.: 90000395
- Added to NRHP: March 20, 1990

Pennsylvania Railroad Bridge over Shavers Creek, also known as Conrail Bridge over Shavers Creek, is a historic multi-span stone arch bridge spanning Shavers Creek and located at Logan Township and Petersburg, Huntingdon County, Pennsylvania. It was built by the Pennsylvania Railroad in 1889. It measures 134-foot-long (41 m).

It was added to the National Register of Historic Places in 1990.
