= Whipple Dam State Park =

State park in Huntingdon County, Pennsylvania

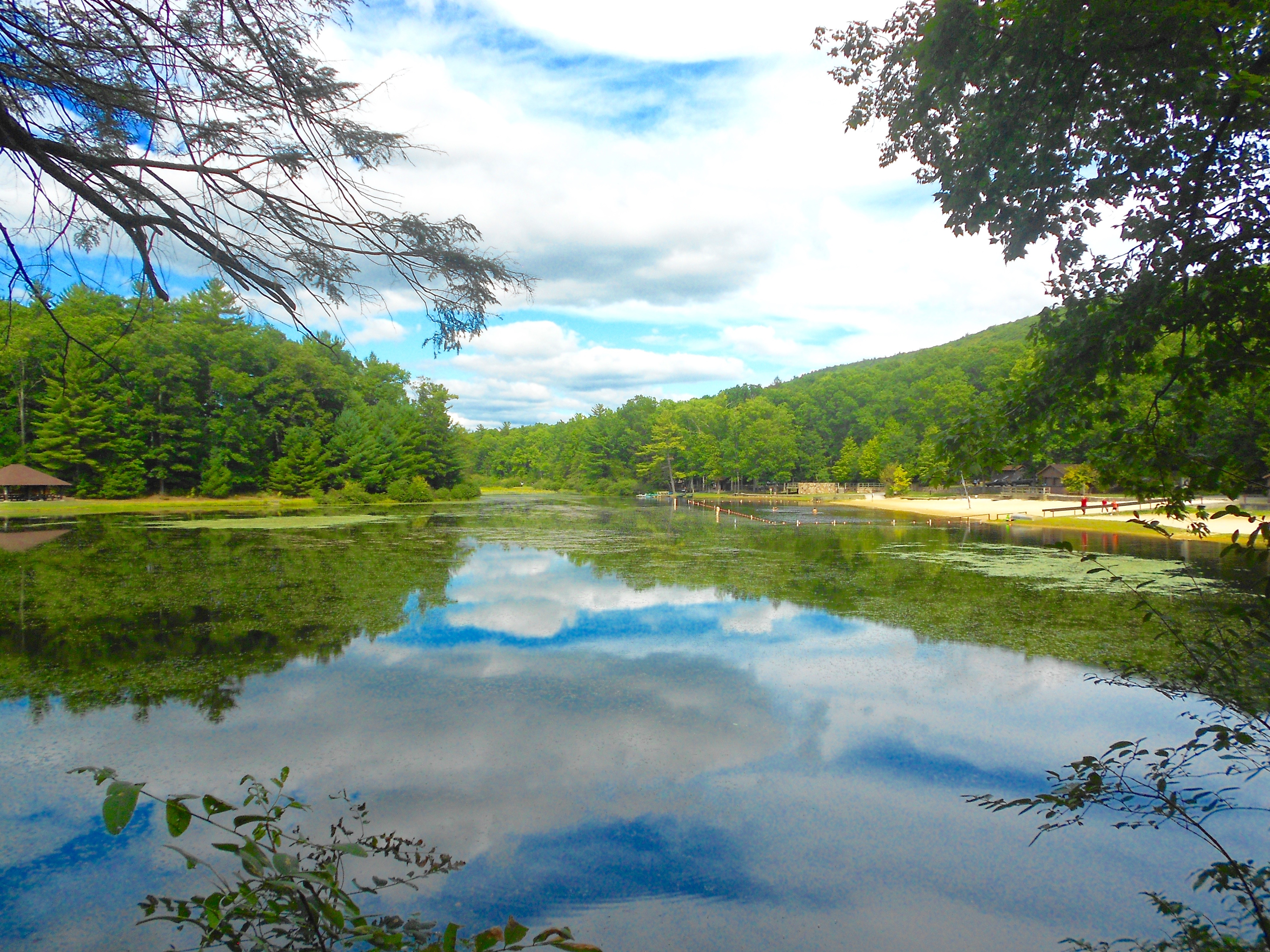
- Whipple Lake

- Location within Pennsylvania Location within the United States
- Interactive map of Whipple Dam State Park
- Location: Jackson Township, Huntingdon County, Pennsylvania, United States
- Coordinates: 40°40′56″N 77°51′52″W
- Area: 256 acres (104 ha)
- Elevation: 984 feet (300 m)
- Established: 1928
- Administrator: Pennsylvania Department of Conservation and Natural Resources
- Website: Official website
- Pennsylvania State Parks
- Whipple Dam State Park Day Use District
- U.S. National Register of Historic Places
- U.S. Historic district
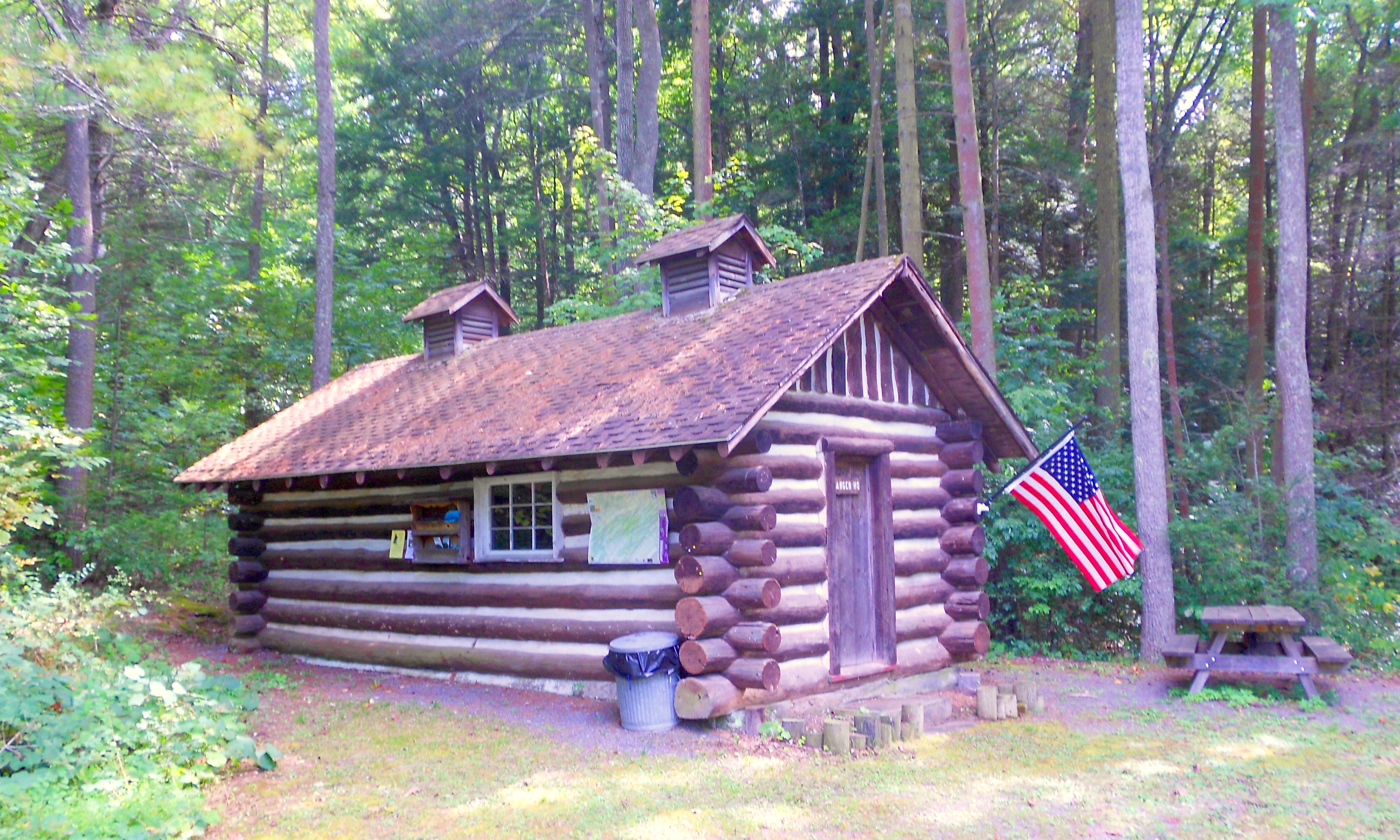
- Whipple Dam ranger headquarters
- Location: Jackson Township, Huntingdon County, Pennsylvania
- Area: 32 acres (13 ha)
- Built: 1933-1941
- Architect: CCC Camp S-60-PA
- Architectural style: National Park Service Rustic
- MPS: Emergency Conservation Work (ECW) Architecture in Pennsylvania State Parks: 1933-1942, TR
- NRHP reference No.: 87000109
- Added to NRHP: 1987

Whipple Dam State Park is a Pennsylvania state park on 256 acres (104 ha) in Jackson Township, Huntingdon County, Pennsylvania in the United States. Whipple Lake is a man-made lake on 22 acres (8.9 ha) that was originally built during the height of the lumber era that swept through Pennsylvania in the late 19th and early 20th century to supply power for a sawmill. Whipple Dam State Park is 12 miles (19 km) south of State College, just east of Pennsylvania Route 26.

== History ==
The land on which Whipple Dam State Park is located was purchased from the Iroquois Confederation in 1754 by the Proprietary Government of Pennsylvania. Eventually the Monroe Iron Works was built on the land and the production of charcoal took place, as well as the mining of iron ore. Remnants of the iron mines can be seen today at the park.

The demand for lumber reached northern Huntingdon County in the 1860s. The old-growth forests of white pine and hemlock were harvested from the mountains. Osgood M. Whipple purchased a large tract of land on which he built a sawmill that was powered by the waters of the lake formed by the dam he also constructed. Mr. Whipple left the lumber business in 1897, but the dam known as Whipple's Dam remained and was used by locals for recreation.

The dam was rebuilt in 1928 by the Department of Forests and Waters, a forerunner of the Pennsylvania Department of Conservation and Natural Resources. A camp for Boy Scouts, Girl Scouts, and Campfire Girls was built on the north side of the lake in 1928 and used until 1941.

The New Deal enacted during the Great Depression led to a boom in construction of state park facilities in Pennsylvania and Whipple Dam was no exception. Unemployed young men were hired by the Civilian Conservation Corps to clear streams of brush, plant many acres of trees in a reforestation effort, build bridges on state roads, and clear roads through the forests for fire prevention. The CCC built many facilities that are still in use today including pavilions, restrooms, roads and the beach. They also dismantled the 1928 dam and constructed a new dam and bridge in 1935. Their work was placed on the National Register of Historic Places in 1987.

== Recreation ==
=== Whipple Lake ===
Whipple Lake is open to fishing, ice fishing, boating, and swimming. The lake is stocked by the Pennsylvania Fish and Boat Commission with trout. Gas powered boats are prohibited on Whipple Lake. Electric powered boats and non powered boats must have current registration with any state. The sand beach opens on Memorial Day weekend and closes Labor Day weekend. There is no lifeguard stationed at the beach. There is a beach volleyball court, bathhouse and snack bar at the beach. The lake provides a habitat for a wide variety of waterfowl as well as great blue heron, osprey, beavers and muskrats.

=== Picnics ===
There are three large pavilions that were built by Civilian Conservation Corps. These pavilions can be reserved up to 11 months in advance. Pavilions that are not reserved are available on a first come, first served basis. In addition to the pavilions there are many picnic tables in the forested picnic area that is near Whipple Lake.

=== Hunting ===
Hunting is permitted within certain parts of Whipple Dam State Park. Hunting is not permitted in the day use area. Hunters are expected to follow the rules and regulations of the Pennsylvania State Game Commission. The common game species are ruffed grouse, squirrels, turkey, white-tailed deer, waterfowl, and black bears. The hunting of groundhogs is prohibited.

== Gallery ==
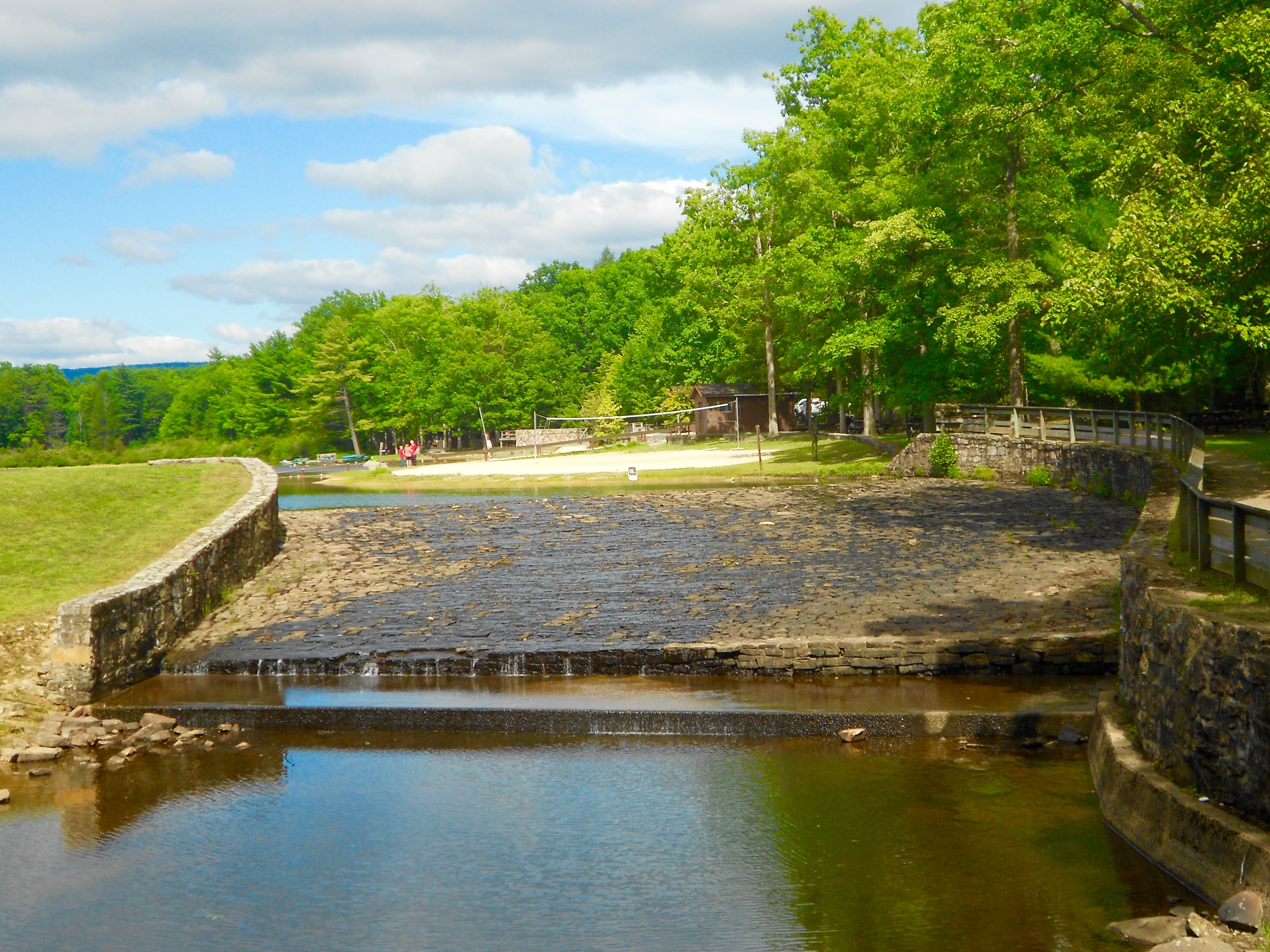
Dam spillway

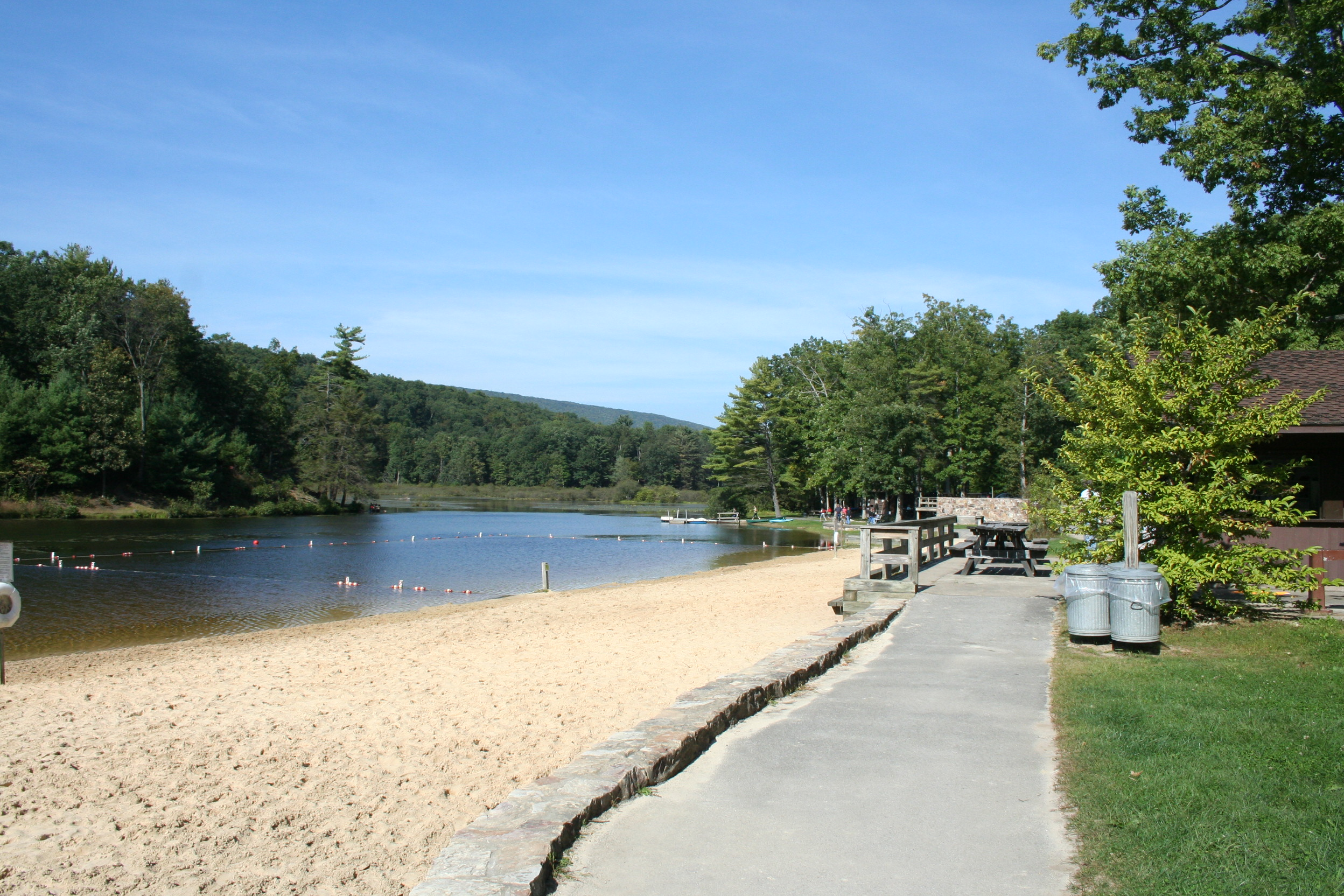
Beach at Whipple Lake

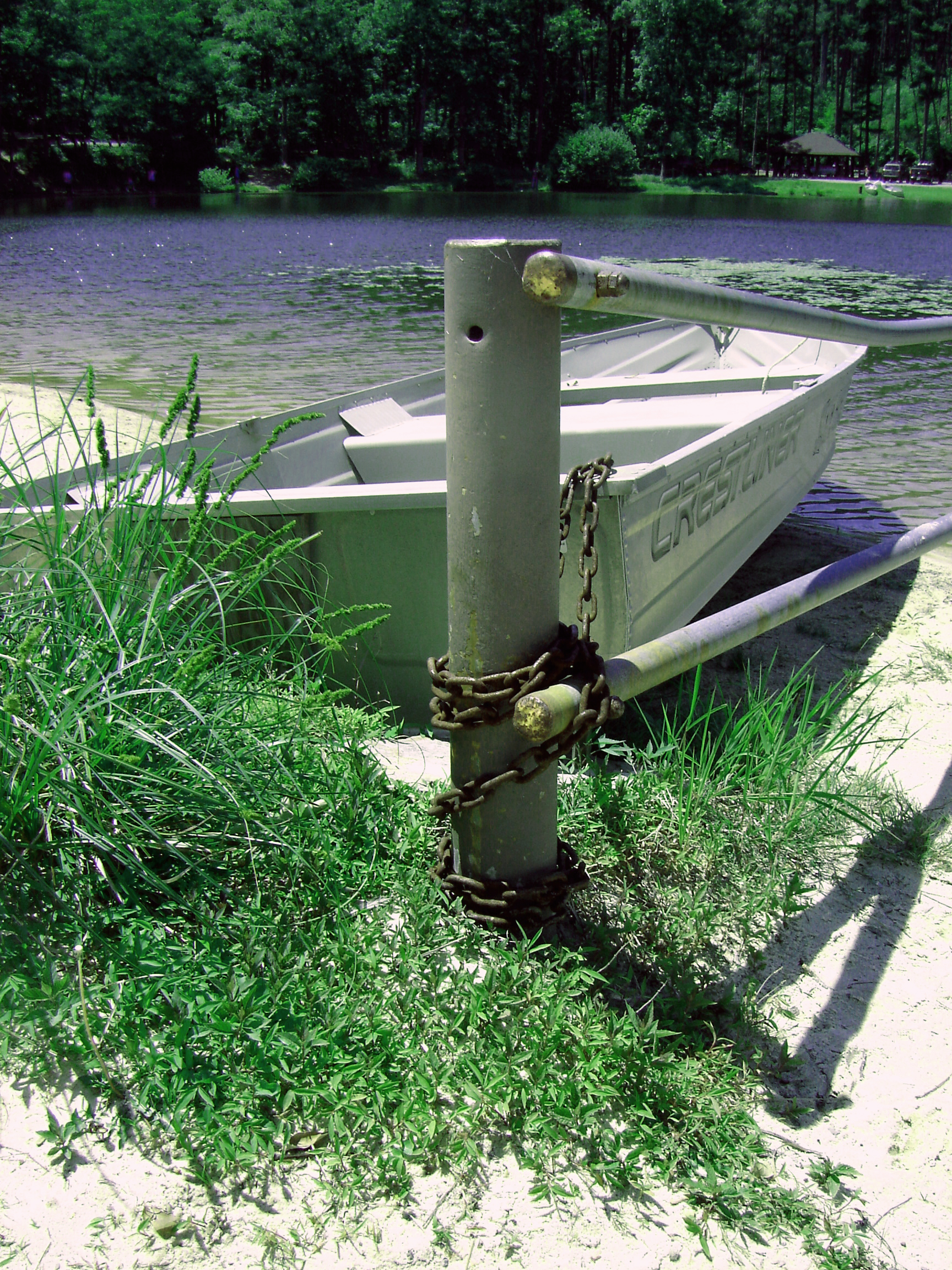
Boat tied to a dock on the lake
