= Pennsylvania Route 305 =

State highway in Pennsylvania, US

Pennsylvania Route 305

Route information
- Maintained by PennDOT
- Length: 28.7 mi (46.2 km)

Major junctions
- West end: US 22 near Alexandria
- PA 26 in Jackson Township
- East end: PA 655 in Belleville

Location
- Country: United States
- State: Pennsylvania
- Counties: Huntingdon, Mifflin

Highway system
- Pennsylvania State Route System; Interstate; US; State; Scenic; Legislative
← PA 304	→ PA 307

Pennsylvania Route 305 (PA 305) is a 29-mile-long (47 km) state highway located in Huntingdon and Mifflin counties in Pennsylvania. The western terminus is at U.S. Route 22 (US 22) in Alexandria. The eastern terminus is at PA 655 in Belleville. The route crosses the Stone Mountain ridge following a valley along a fault line at 40°37′46″N 77°45′31″W near Greenwood Furnace State Park.

== Route description ==
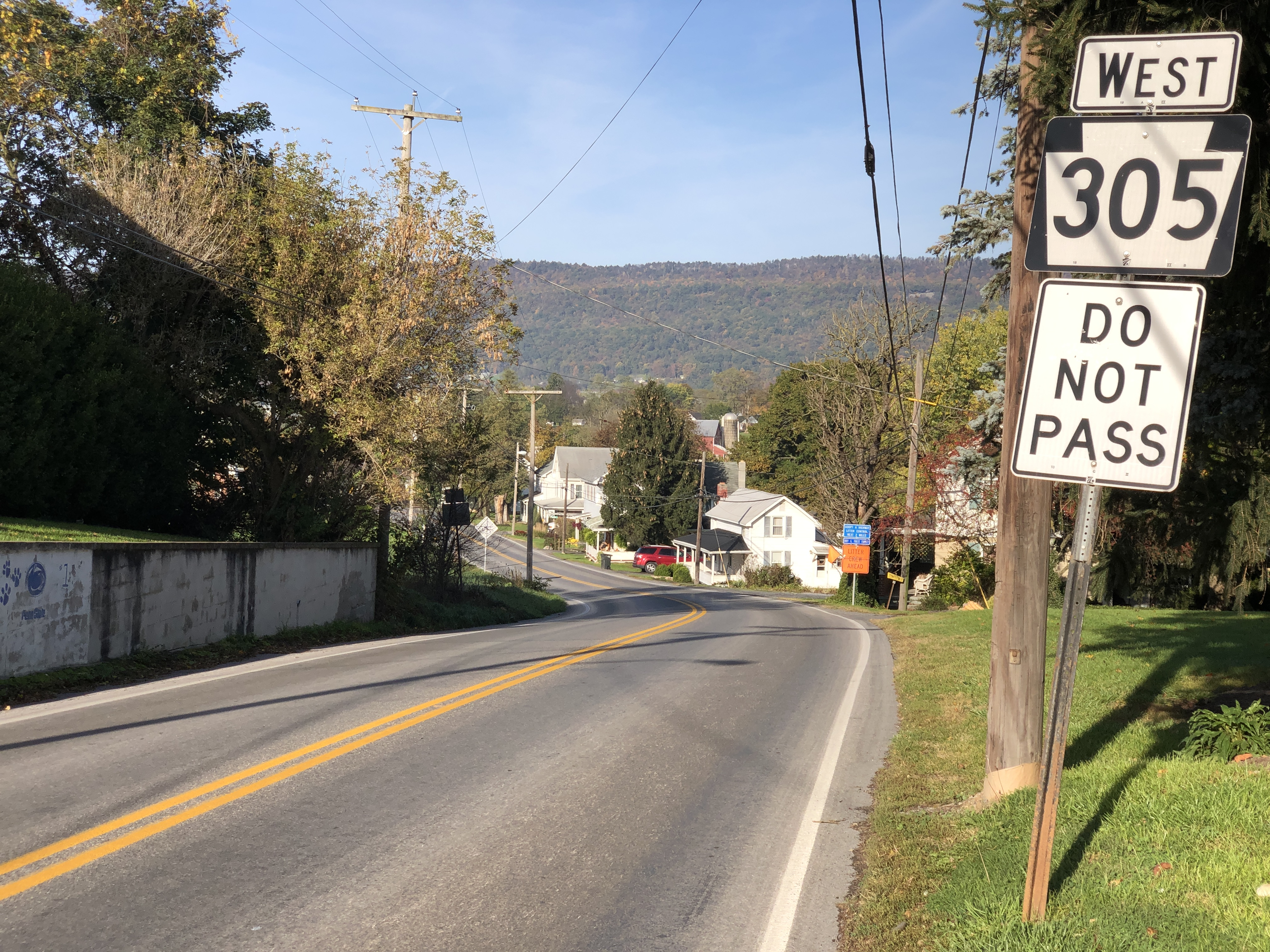
PA 305 westbound past PA 655 in Belleville

PA 305 begins at an intersection with US 22 in Porter Township, Huntingdon County, heading north on two-lane undivided Bridge Street. The road heads through areas of homes with some farm fields, crossing the Frankstown Branch Juniata River into the borough of Alexandria. Here, the route turns east-southeast onto Main Street, passing through more residential areas. PA 305 heads back into Porter Township and turns northeast onto Juniata Valley Pike, entering agricultural areas with occasional homes. The route crosses the Little Juniata River into Logan Township and comes to a bridge over Norfolk Southern's Pittsburgh Line, turning east onto West Diamond Street. The road runs through more agricultural areas before it enters the borough of Petersburg and becomes Diamond Street, passing homes. PA 305 turns north onto King Street and runs past more residences, turning northeast onto Shavers Creek Road and entering Logan Township again. At this point, the route heads through farmland with some homes and patches of woods, heading through the community of Ribot. The road continues into West Township and passes through more rural areas, running through Cottage and Neffs Mills.

In the residential community of Mooresville, PA 305 turns southeast onto Greenwood Road and winds through open farmland with some homes, crossing into Barree Township. In this area, the route heads through wooded areas with some farm fields. The road passes through Manor Hill and heads east through farmland before passing through more woodland and curving northeast at Saulsburg. PA 305 continues into a mix of farms and woods with some residences as it heads into Jackson Township, where it turns southeast into open agricultural areas, curving east and coming to an intersection with PA 26 in Ennisville. Here, PA 26 turns east to form a concurrency with PA 305, crossing the Standing Stone Creek and running through more rural areas with some homes. PA 305 splits from PA 26 in McAlevys Fort by turning to the southeast, remaining along Greenwood Road and passing through more farmland. The road turns to the northeast before heading east into Rothrock State Forest, where it begins to ascend Stone Mountain. The route heads to the east-northeast and passes through Greenwood Furnace State Park and the community of Greenwood Furnace before passing through more of the state forest, turning to the south and before curving to the southwest.

At the top of the mountain, PA 305 crosses into Union Township in Mifflin County and leaves the boundaries of Rothrock State Forest. The route begins to descend the forested mountain, curving to the east. At the base of Stone Mountain, the road turns to the southeast and heads into the Kishacoquillas Valley, an agricultural valley which is home to an Amish community. Here, the route runs through farmland with some residences. PA 305 continues southeast to its eastern terminus at an intersection with PA 655 near the community of Belleville.

== Major intersections ==
County	Location	mi	km	Destinations	Notes
Huntingdon	Porter Township	0.0	0.0	US 22 (William Penn Highway) – Huntingdon, Hollidaysburg	Western terminus
Huntingdon	Jackson Township	17.6	28.3	PA 26 south (Standing Stone Road) – Huntingdon	West end of PA 26 overlap
Huntingdon	Jackson Township	18.4	29.6	PA 26 north (McAlevys Fort Road) – State College	East end of PA 26 overlap
Mifflin	Union Township	28.7	46.2	PA 655 (West Main Street) – Mill Creek, Reedsville	Eastern terminus
1.000 mi = 1.609 km; 1.000 km = 0.621 mi: Concurrency terminus
