= McAlevys Fort, Pennsylvania =

Unincorporated community in Pennsylvania, US

- Unincorporated community
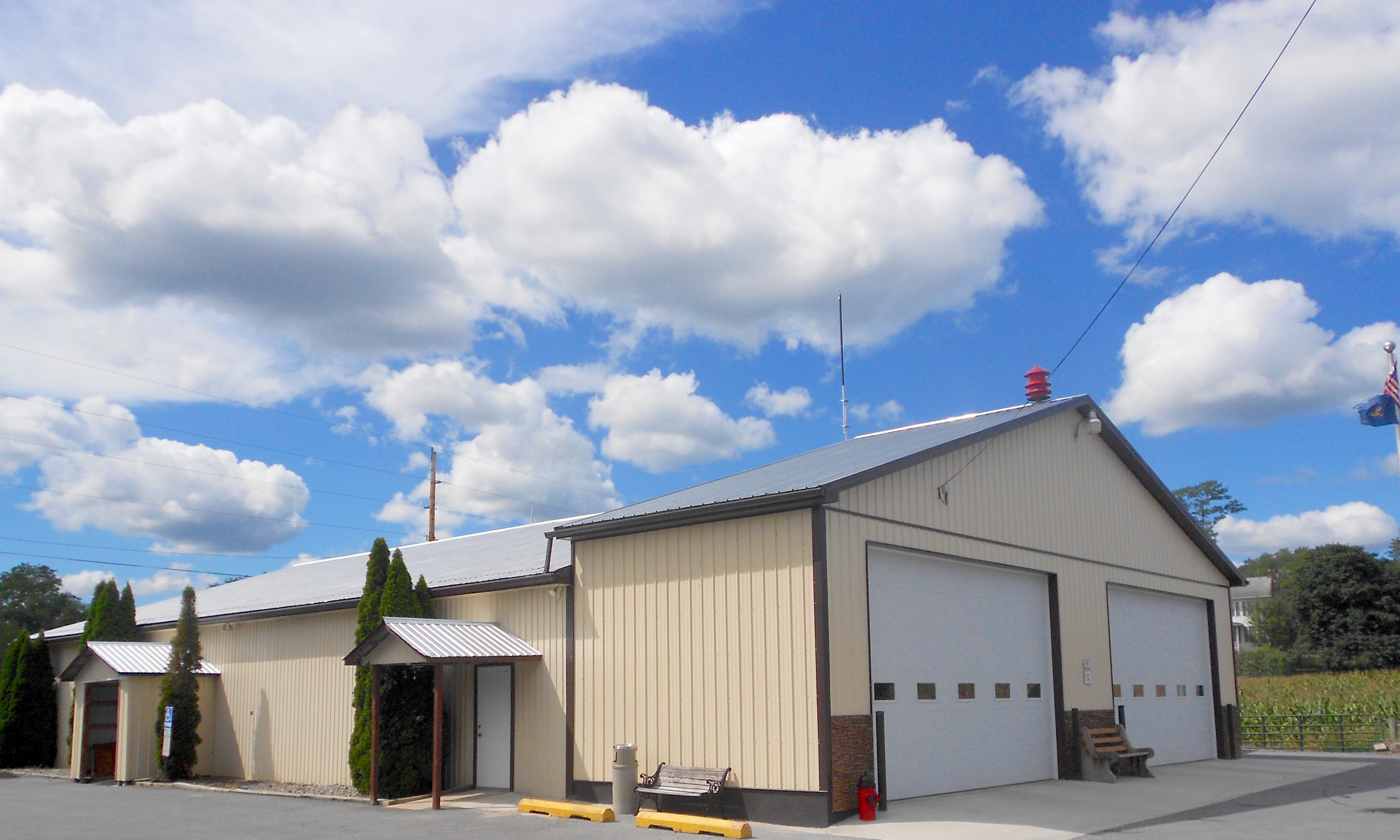
- The Stone Creek Valley Fire Department on PA 26 in McAlevys Fort.

- Location within Pennsylvania Location within the United States
- Coordinates: 40°38′23″N 77°49′53″W
- Country: United States
- State: Pennsylvania
- County: Huntingdon
- Township: Jackson
- Elevation: 748 ft (228 m)
- Time zone: UTC-5 (Eastern (EST))
  - Summer (DST): UTC-4 (EDT)
- GNIS feature ID: 1180598

McAlevys Fort is an unincorporated community located in Jackson Township in Huntingdon County, Pennsylvania, United States. The community is located along Pennsylvania Route 26, north of the overlap with Pennsylvania Route 305.

The community was named after a pioneer fort which was built near the present town site in 1778 by Captain William McAlevy.
