= Petersburg, Pennsylvania =

Borough in Pennsylvania, US

- Borough
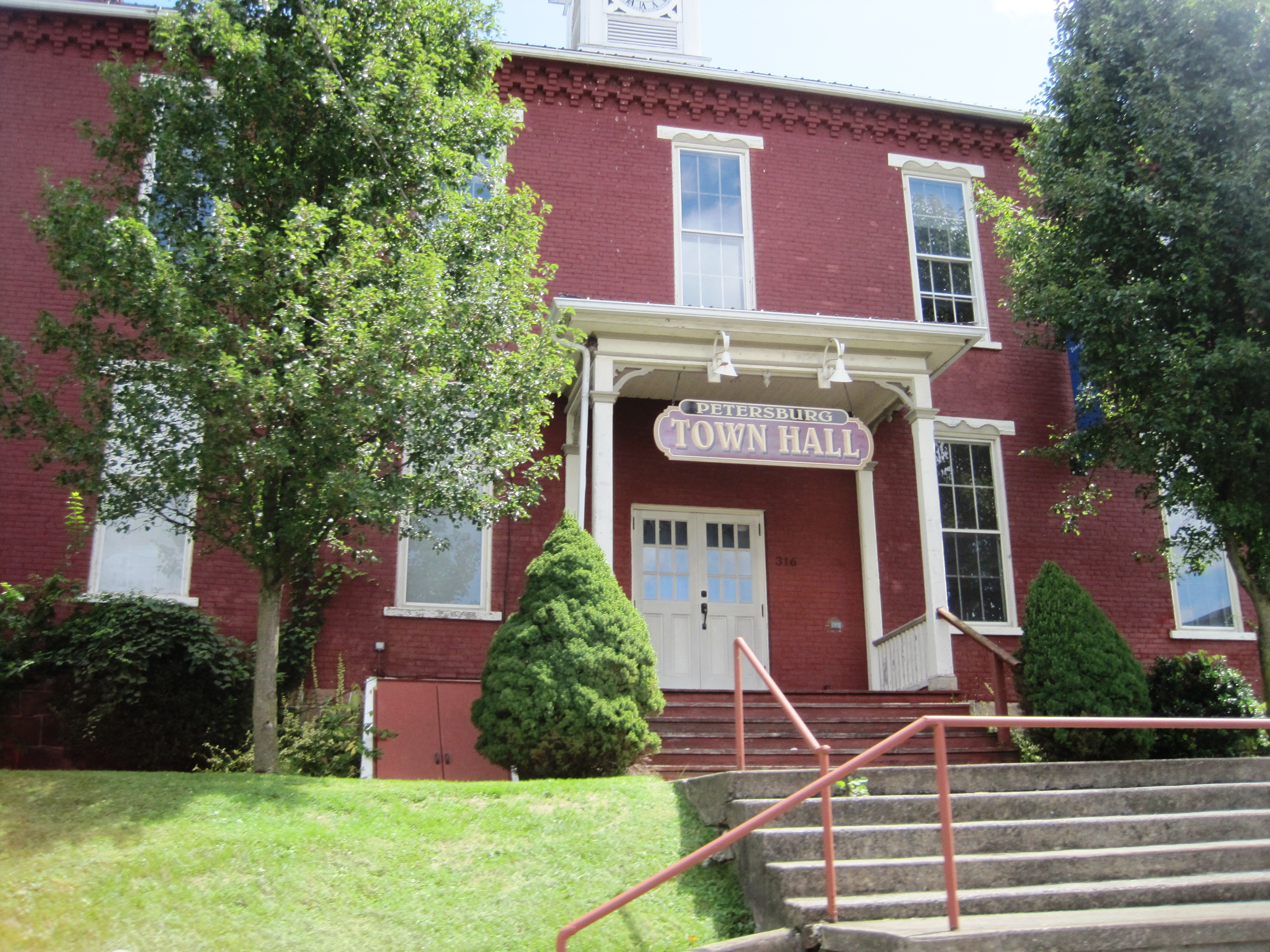
- Town hall

- Location of Petersburg in Huntingdon County, Pennsylvania.

- Location within Pennsylvania Location within the United States
- Coordinates: 40°34′21″N 78°03′02″W
- Country: United States
- State: Pennsylvania
- County: Huntingdon

Government
  - Type: Borough Council

Area
  - Total: 0.33 sq mi (0.86 km^{2})
  - Land: 0.33 sq mi (0.86 km^{2})
  - Water: 0 sq mi (0.00 km^{2})
- Elevation: 663 ft (202 m)

Population (2020)
  - Total: 419
  - Density: 1,260/sq mi (486.3/km^{2})
- Time zone: UTC-5 (Eastern (EST))
  - Summer (DST): UTC-4 (EDT)
- ZIP code: 16669
- Area code: 814
- FIPS code: 42-59616
- GNIS feature ID: 1215276
- Local phone exchanges: 669

Petersburg is a borough in Huntingdon County, Pennsylvania, United States. It was a stop on the former Pennsylvania Railroad Main Line between Tyrone and Huntingdon and the junction point for the Petersburg Branch. As of the 2020 census, Petersburg had a population of 419.

== Geography ==
Petersburg is located in northern Huntingdon County on the east side of Shaver Creek where it joins the Juniata River, just east of that river's source at the confluence of the Little Juniata River and the Frankstown Branch.

Pennsylvania Route 305 passes through Petersburg, leading northeast 19 miles (31 km) to Greenwood Furnace State Park and west 3 miles (5 km) to Alexandria. Huntingdon, the county seat, is 9 miles (14 km) to the south via local roads.

According to the United States Census Bureau, the borough has a total area of 0.33 square miles (0.86 km^{2}), all land.

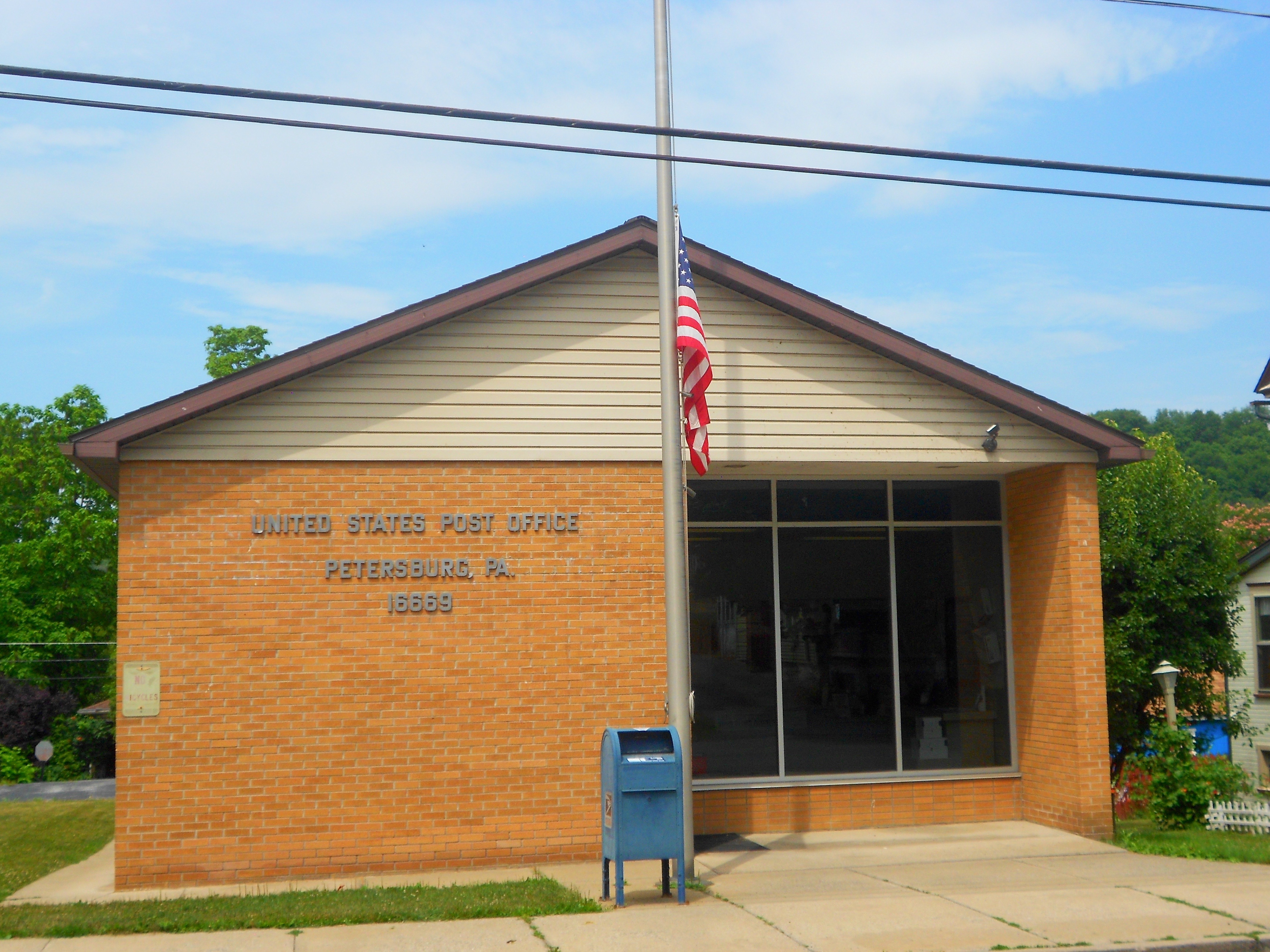
Post office

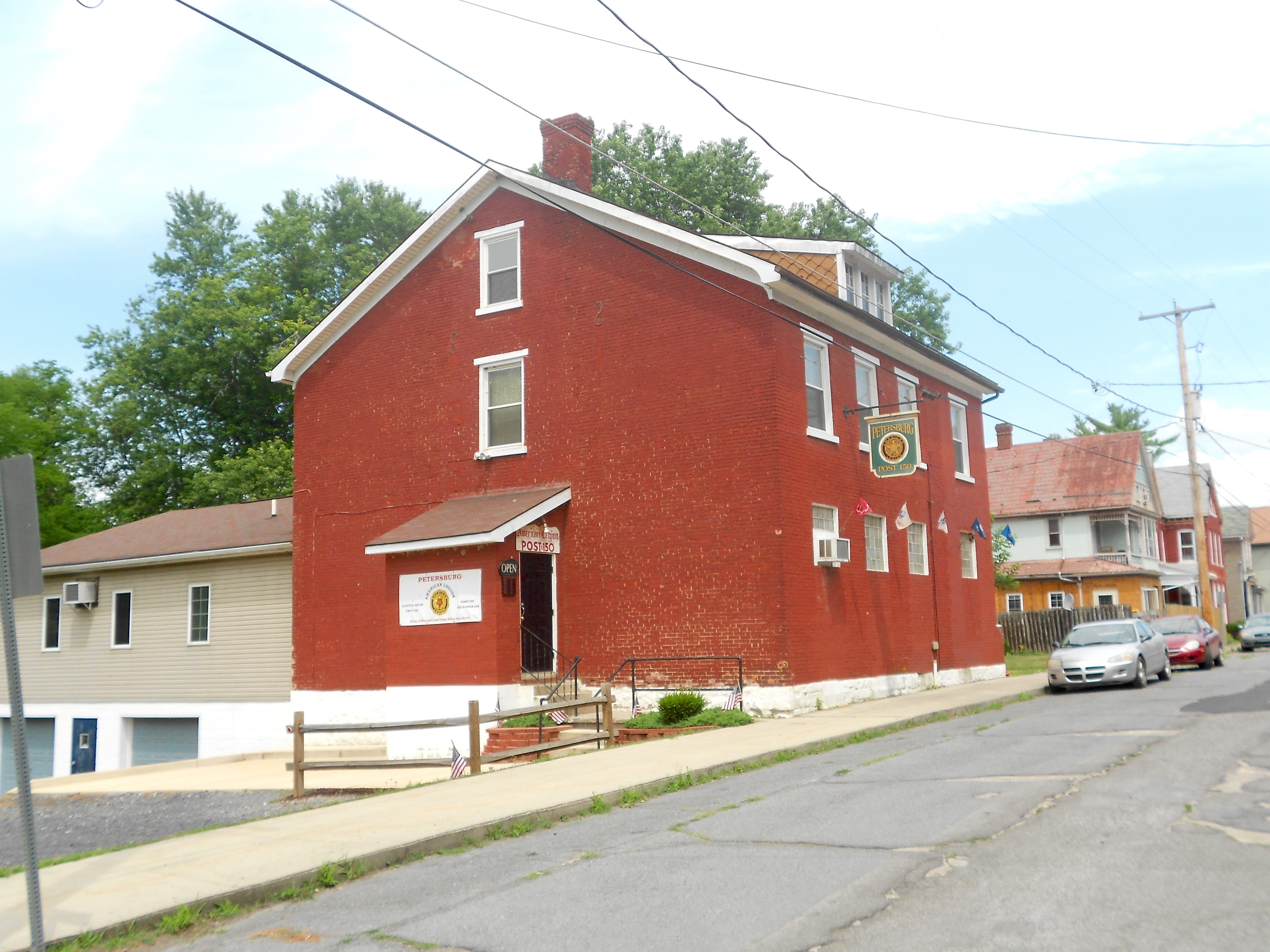
American Legion Post

== Demographics ==
Historical population
Census	Pop.	Note	%±
1810	194		—
1820	188		−3.1%
1840	196		—
1850	264		34.7%
1860	334		26.5%
1870	381		14.1%
1880	381		0.0%
1890	555		45.7%
1900	781		40.7%
1910	705		−9.7%
1920	691		−2.0%
1930	627		−9.3%
1940	638		1.8%
1950	621		−2.7%
1960	552		−11.1%
1970	555		0.5%
1980	543		−2.2%
1990	469		−13.6%
2000	445		−5.1%
2010	482		8.3%
2020	419		−13.1%

As of the census of 2000, there were 455 people, 177 households, and 132 families residing in the borough. The population density was 1,182.1 inhabitants per square mile (456.4/km^{2}). There were 193 housing units at an average density of 501.4 per square mile (193.6/km^{2}). The racial makeup of the borough was 99.56% White, 0.22% Native American, and 0.22% from two or more races.

There were 177 households, out of which 31.6% had children under the age of 18 living with them, 57.6% were married couples living together, 11.9% had a female householder with no husband present, and 25.4% were non-families. 18.6% of all households were made up of individuals, and 7.9% had someone living alone who was 65 years of age or older. The average household size was 2.57 and the average family size was 2.91.

In the borough the population was spread out, with 24.2% under the age of 18, 9.2% from 18 to 24, 32.3% from 25 to 44, 21.1% from 45 to 64, and 13.2% who were 65 years of age or older. The median age was 35 years. For every 100 females there were 92.0 males. For every 100 females age 18 and over, there were 89.6 males.

The median income for a household in the borough was $34,013, and the median income for a family was $35,417. Males had a median income of $29,375 versus $17,292 for females. The per capita income for the borough was $16,141. About 3.7% of families and 6.3% of the population were below the poverty line, including 6.0% of those under age 18 and 11.8% of those age 65 or over.
