= West Township, Huntingdon County, Pennsylvania =

Township in Pennsylvania, US

Coordinates: 40°37′00″N 77°57′59″W

West Township, Pennsylvania
- Township
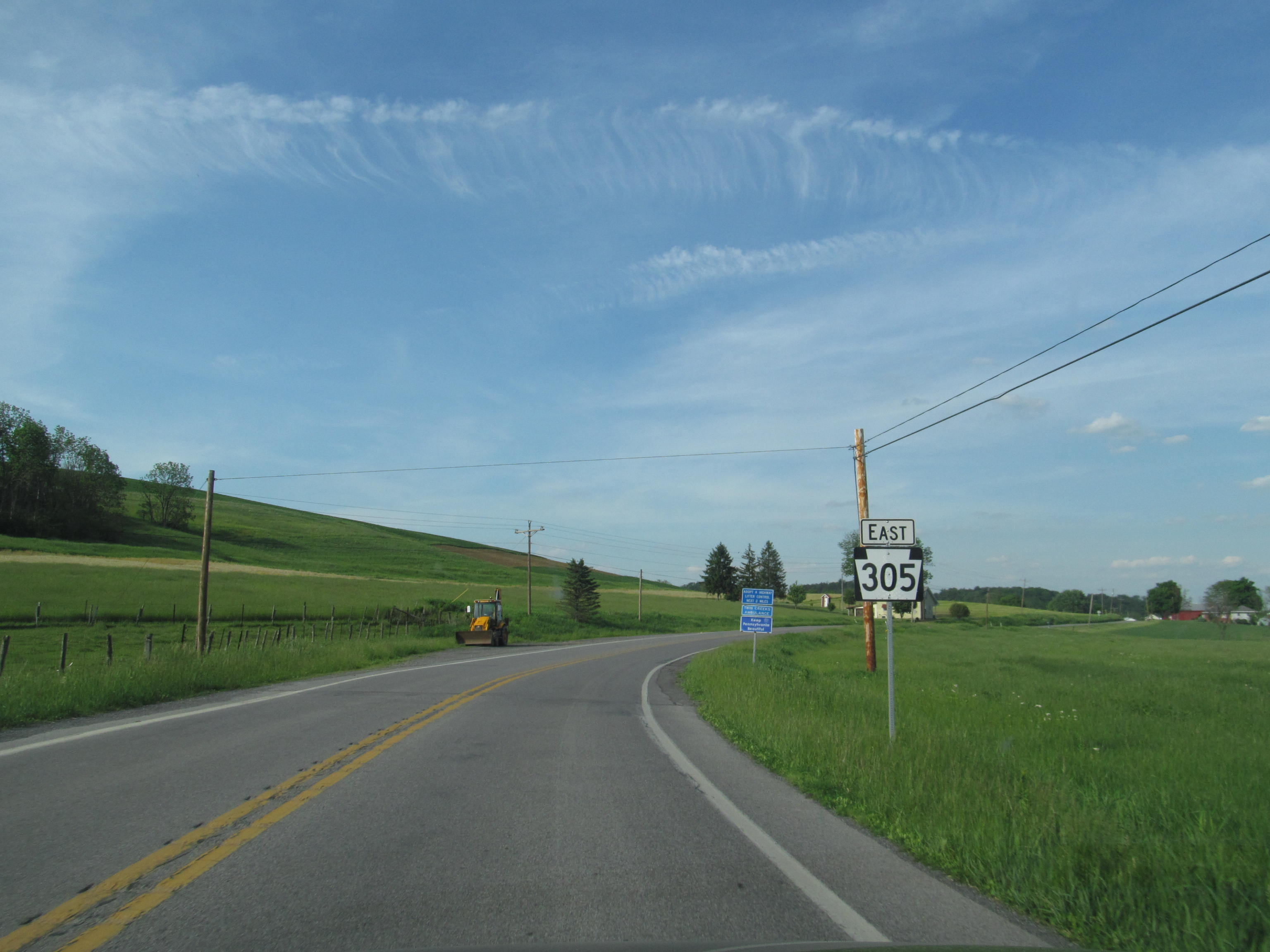
- Eastbound PA 305 in West Township

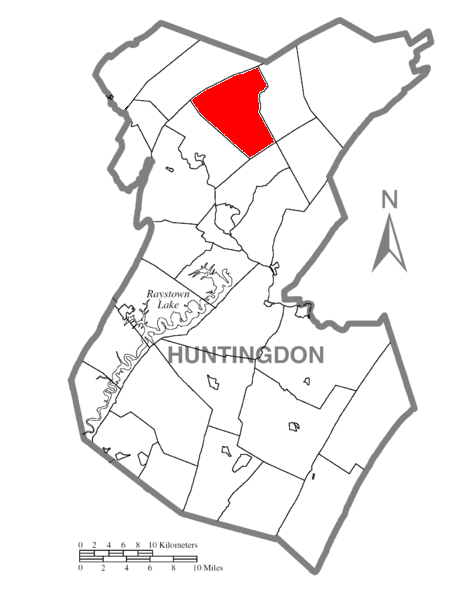
- Map of Huntingdon County, Pennsylvania Highlighting West Township

- Map of Huntingdon County, Pennsylvania
- Country: United States
- State: Pennsylvania
- County: Huntingdon

Area
  - Total: 31.09 sq mi (80.52 km^{2})
  - Land: 31.07 sq mi (80.48 km^{2})
  - Water: 0.015 sq mi (0.04 km^{2})

Population (2020)
  - Total: 517 ▼
  - Estimate (2022): 511
  - Density: 18.2/sq mi (7.01/km^{2})
- Time zone: UTC-5 (Eastern (EST))
  - Summer (DST): UTC-4 (EDT)
- FIPS code: 42-061-82352

West Township is a township that is located in Huntingdon County, Pennsylvania, United States. The population was 517 at the time of the 2020 census.

== Geography ==
According to the United States Census Bureau, the township has a total area of 31.0 square miles (80.3 km^{2}), of which 31.0 square miles (80.3 km^{2}) is land and 0.04 square mile (0.1 km^{2}) (0.06%) is water.

== Demographics ==
Historical population
Census	Pop.	Note	%±
2000	528		—
2010	571		8.1%
2020	517		−9.5%
2022 (est.)	511		−1.2%
U.S. Decennial Census

As of the census of 2000, there were 528 people, 203 households, and 155 families residing in the township.

The population density was 17.0 people per square mile (6.6/km^{2}). There were 287 housing units at an average density of 9.3/sq mi (3.6/km^{2}).

The racial makeup of the township was 99.24% White, 0.19% Native American, 0.19% Asian, 0.38% from other races.

There were 203 households, out of which 30.0% had children under the age of eighteen living with them; 70.4% were married couples living together, 3.9% had a female householder with no husband present, and 23.2% were non-families. Out of all of the households that were documented, 21.2% were made up of individuals, and 8.4% had someone living alone who was sixty-five years of age or older.

The average household size was 2.60 and the average family size was 3.04.

Within the township, the population was spread out, with 22.3% of residents who were under the age of 18, 9.5% from 18 to 24, 28.2% from 25 to 44, 26.5% from 45 to 64, and 13.4% who were 65 years of age or older. The median age was 38 years.

For every one hundred females, there were 97.8 males. For every one hundred females who were aged eighteen or older, there were 102.0 males.

The median income for a household in the township was $37,917, and the median income for a family was $43,672. Males had a median income of $29,271 compared with that of $21,250 for females.

The per capita income for the township was $17,910.

Approximately 4.4% of families and 7.4% of the population were living below the poverty line, including 8.1% of those who were under the age of eighteen and 18.3% of those who were aged sixty-five or older.
