= Marion Township, Centre County, Pennsylvania =

Township in Pennsylvania, US

Coordinates: 41°00′01″N 77°37′34″W

- Township
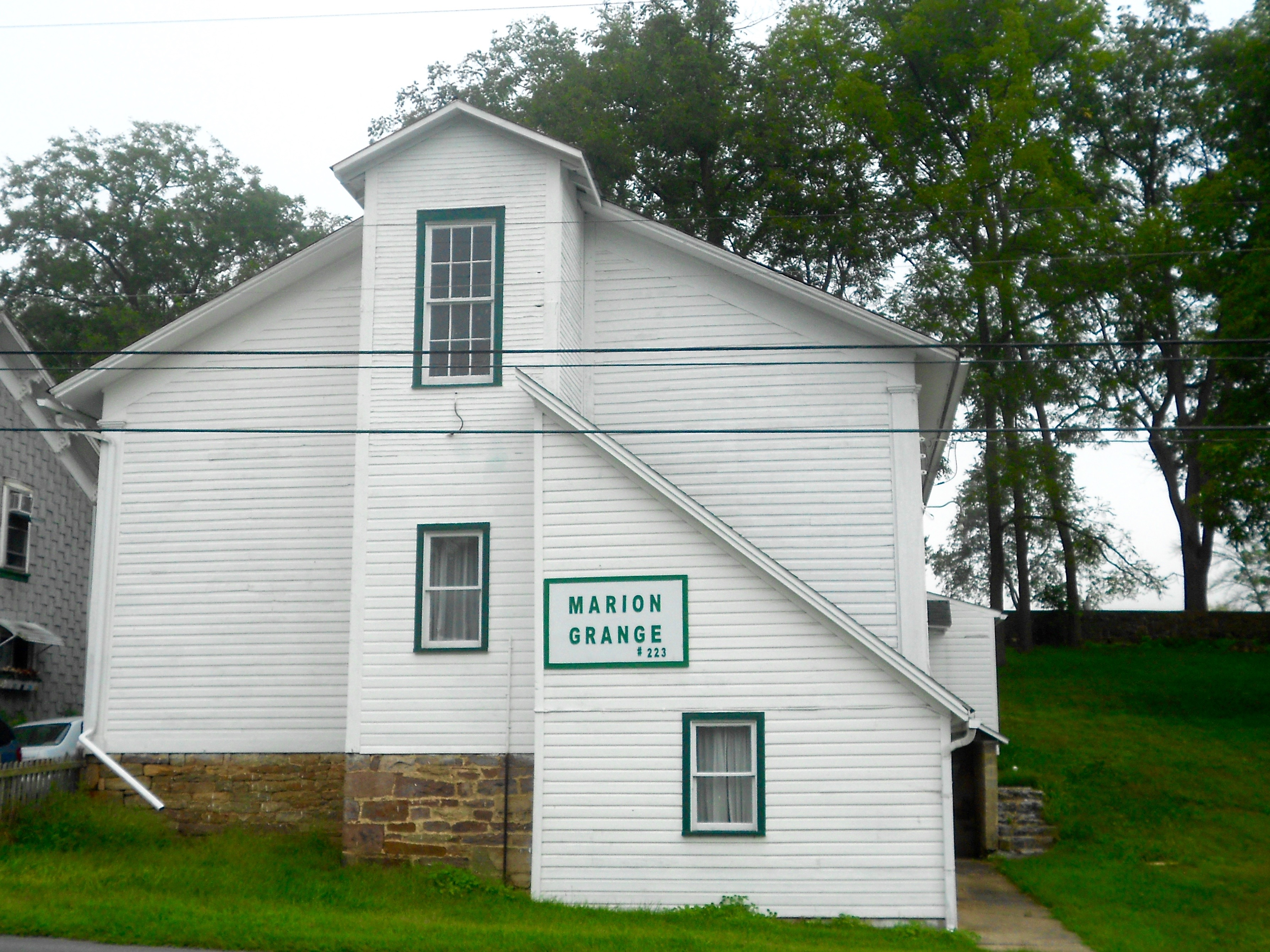
- Grange Hall in Jacksonville

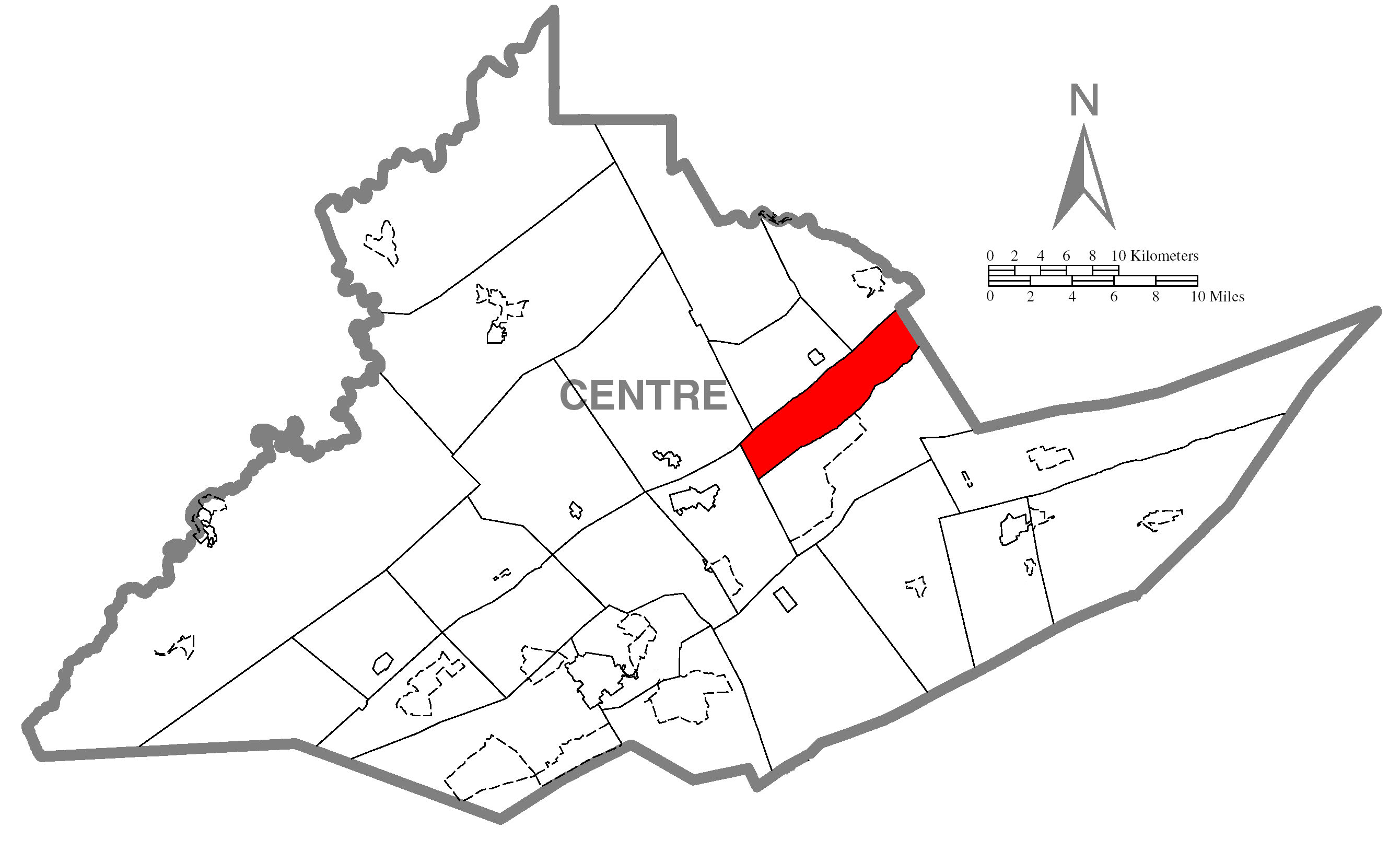
- Map of Centre County, Pennsylvania highlighting Marion Township

- Map of Centre County, Pennsylvania
- Country: United States
- State: Pennsylvania
- County: Centre
- Settled: 1785
- Incorporated: 1840

Area
  - Total: 22.05 sq mi (57.10 km^{2})
  - Land: 22.05 sq mi (57.10 km^{2})
  - Water: 0 sq mi (0.00 km^{2})

Population (2020)
  - Total: 1,196 ▼
  - Estimate (2021): 1,199
  - Density: 56.4/sq mi (21.79/km^{2})
- FIPS code: 42-027-47456
- Website: mariontownship.net

Marion Township is a township that is located in Centre County, Pennsylvania, United States. It is part of the State College, Pennsylvania Metropolitan Statistical Area.

The population was 1,196 at the time of the 2020 census, a decline from the figure of 1,224 tabulated in 2010. Part of Bald Eagle State Park is in Marion Township.

== Geography ==
According to the United States Census Bureau, the township has a total area of 22.0 square miles (57.1 km^{2}), all land.

Marion Township is bordered by Boggs and Howard townships to the northwest, Liberty Township to the north, Clinton County to the northeast, Walker Township to the southeast and Spring Township to the southwest.

The township contains the census-designated place of Jacksonville and part of Snydertown.

== Demographics ==
Historical population
Census	Pop.	Note	%±
2000	978		—
2010	1,224		25.2%
2020	1,196		−2.3%
2021 (est.)	1,199		0.3%
U.S. Decennial Census

As of the census of 2000, there were 978 people, 322 households, and 268 families residing in the township.

The population density was 44.6 inhabitants per square mile (17.2/km^{2}). There were 339 housing units at an average density of 15.5/sq mi (6.0/km^{2}).

The racial makeup of the township was 99.39% White, 0.10% African American, 0.20% Native American, and 0.31% from two or more races. Hispanic or Latino of any race were 0.20% of the population.

There were 322 households, out of which 46.3% had children under the age of eighteen living with them; 75.2% were married couples living together, 5.3% had a female householder with no husband present, and 16.5% were non-families. 13.0% of all households were made up of individuals, and 5.3% had someone living alone who was sixty-five years of age or older.

The average household size was 3.03 and the average family size was 3.35.

Within the township, the population was spread out, with 30.8% of residents who were under the age of eighteen, 7.2% who were aged eighteen to twenty-four, 32.8% who were aged twenty-five to forty-four, 20.9% who were aged forty-five to sixty-four, and 8.4% who were sixty-five years of age or older. The median age was thirty-four years.

For every one hundred females, there were 107.6 males. For every one hundred females who were aged eighteen or older, there were 105.2 males.

The median income for a household in the township was $41,985, and the median income for a family was $46,691. Males had a median income of $30,417 compared with that of $23,681 for females.

The per capita income for the township was $15,153.

Approximately 4.7% of families and 4.3% of the population were living below the poverty line, including 1.3% of those who were under the age of eighteen and 18.2% of those who were aged sixty-five or older.
