= Greenwood Furnace State Park =

State park in Pennsylvania, US

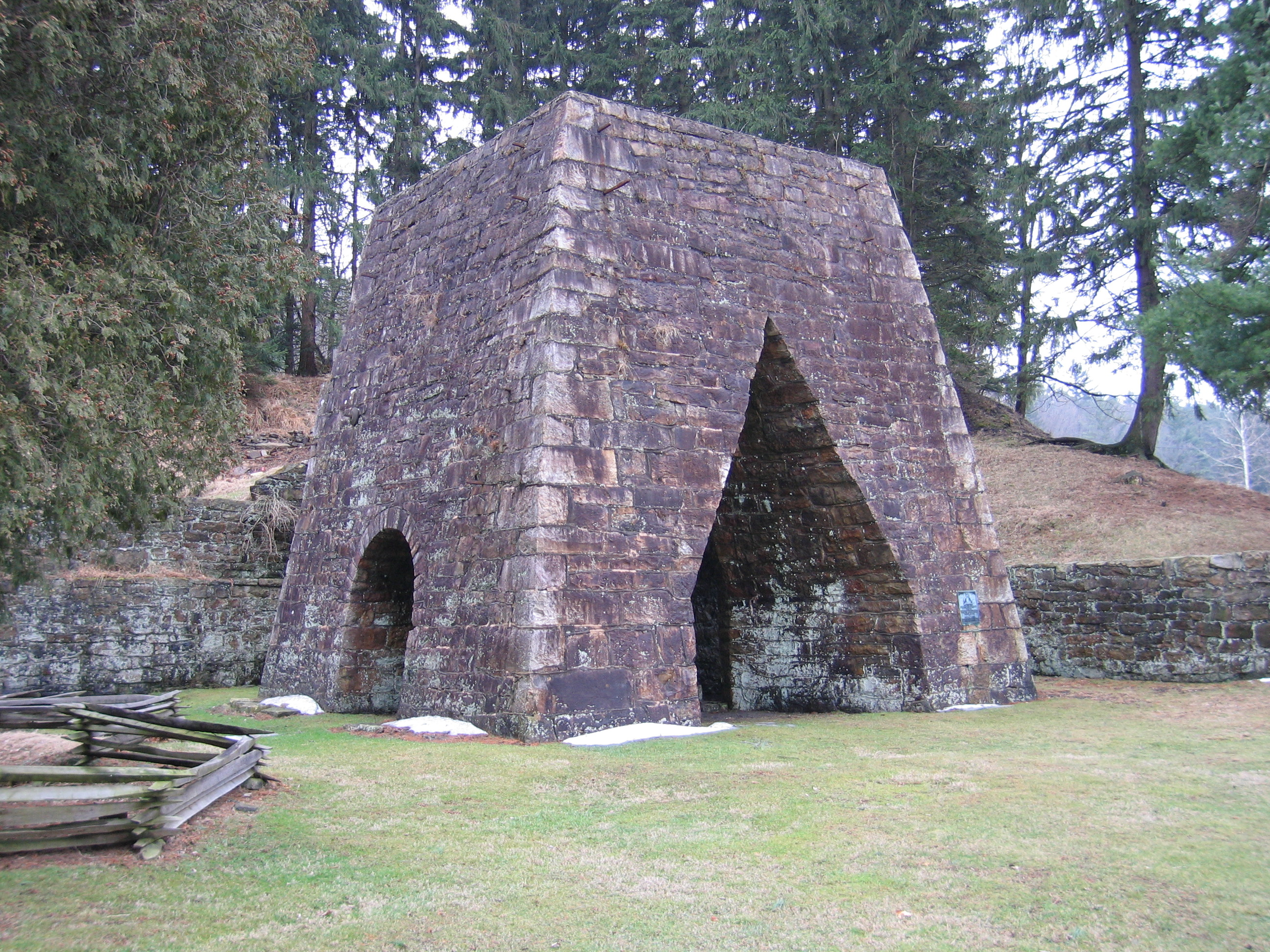
- Stone stack no. 2 of Greenwood Iron Furnace

- Location within Pennsylvania Location within the United States
- Interactive map of Greenwood Furnace State Park
- Location: Jackson Township, Huntingdon County, Pennsylvania, United States
- Coordinates: 40°39′02″N 77°45′16″W
- Area: 423 acres (171 ha)
- Elevation: 1,020 feet (310 m)
- Established: 1924
- Administrator: Pennsylvania Department of Conservation and Natural Resources
- Website: Official website
- Pennsylvania State Parks

Pennsylvania Historical Marker
- Designated: April 30, 1947

Greenwood Furnace State Park is a 423-acre (171 ha) Pennsylvania state park in Jackson Township, Huntingdon County, Pennsylvania, in the United States. The park is near the historic iron making center of Greenwood Furnace. The park includes the ghost town of Greenwood that grew up around the ironworks, old roads and charcoal hearths. Greenwood Furnace State Park is adjacent to Rothrock State Forest and on the western edge of an area of Central Pennsylvania known as the Seven Mountains. The park is on Pennsylvania Route 305, 20 miles (32 km) south of State College.

Within the park is Greenwood Lake, a 6-acre (2.4 ha) lake that is stocked with trout and which allows ice fishing during the winter. The dam that forms the lake is listed on the National Register of Historic Places. Greenwood Furnace State Park was chosen by the Pennsylvania Department of Conservation and Natural Resources (DCNR) and its Bureau of Parks as one of "25 Must-See Pennsylvania State Parks".

== History ==
=== Early settlement ===
The northern Huntingdon County area was once inhabited by the Ona Jutta Hage or Juniata tribe. Their name meant "The People of the Standing Stone", an obelisk that once stood in their village near present-day Huntingdon. The Juniata had moved away by the time that Pennsylvania was colonized by William Penn. Penn bought the land from the Iroquois and the Tuscarora and Shawnee that had resettled throughout central Pennsylvania were soon forced to move on once again. Many different groups of European settlers migrated to the area by the late 18th century. They were mostly farmers of Scots-Irish descent with large numbers of Amish and Mennonite Germans who had fled religious persecution in Germany, Austria, and Switzerland. Later settlers built a tavern and a sawmill in the present location of Greenwood Furnace State Park.

=== Greenwood Iron Works ===
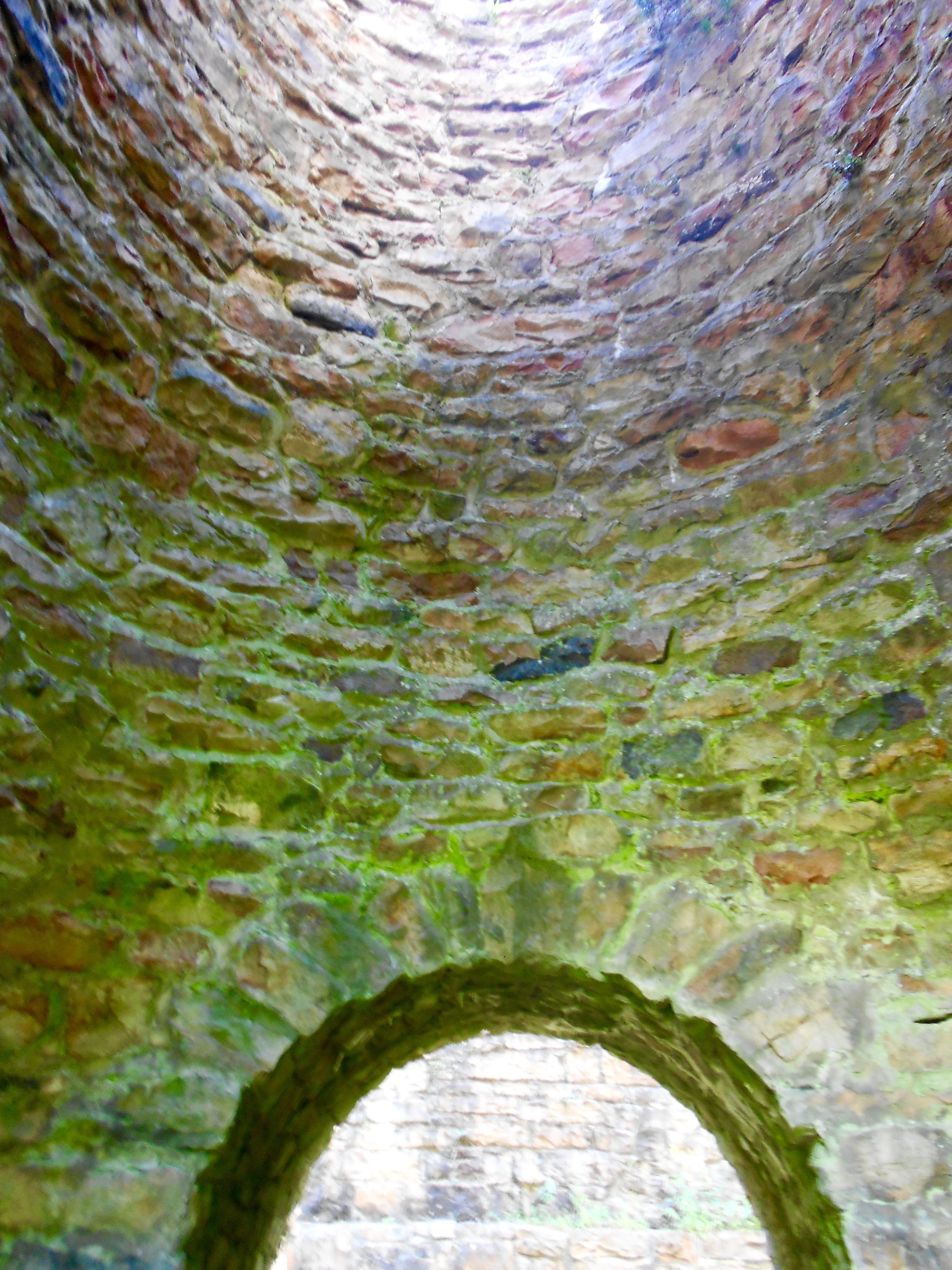
Inside of the reconstructed stack no. 2

Greenwood Furnace State Park is named for the iron furnace that was once the center of industry in northern Huntingdon County. Greenwood Furnace was open for operation on June 5, 1834. The parent company, Norris, Rawle and Co., selected the site because of the ease in access to the needed natural resources, iron ore, limestone, trees for charcoal and a steady water supply. Greenwood Furnace was able to produce up to five tons of pig iron ingots per day at the height of its production.

Soon a small village sprang up around Greenwood Furnace to support the needs of the workers and the furnace. The village included 20 houses, a company store, company offices, stables and a blacksmith shop. A deposit of high quality iron ore was discovered in the area leading to further growth in the Greenwood Furnace area. A gristmill was constructed in 1842. Greenwood Lake was built at this time to create a water supply to power the mill. Greenwood Lake is currently used as a recreation lake by visitors to Greenwood Furnace State Park.

Ownership of Greenwood Furnace Iron Works was transferred to John A. Wright in 1847. Wright was one of the founders of the Pennsylvania Railroad in nearby Altoona. The ironworks at Greenwood and nearby Freedom Iron Works were supervised in part by Andrew Carnegie. Under the leadership of Wright and Carnegie Greenwood and Freedom became vitally important centers of iron production for the booming railroad industry. The company expanded its iron output by building a Bessemer furnace at Freedom Iron Works and building a second stack at Greenwood Furnace.

The community surrounding Greenwood Furnace Iron Works reached its zenith in the 1870s. At that time it included the two furnaces, the ironmaster's mansion, a church and school, a company store and blacksmith and wagon shop, there were seventeen stables, ninety tenant houses in the mill village and the gristmill. Greenwood Furnace was the home to about 300 families and included its own baseball team known at the "Energetics" and a fifteen-piece brass band.

Greenwood Furnace became a ghost town in the early 20th century. Changes in the iron industry lead to the closing of the now obsolete furnaces. When the furnaces were shut down, the jobs were gone and the people of Greenwood left their homes for jobs elsewhere. The land of the former furnace and village was soon reclaimed for nature through the efforts of the Commonwealth of Pennsylvania.

=== Tree nursery and state park ===
On February 1, 1906, the state of Pennsylvania purchased the former lands of the ironworks and village from the Logan Iron and Steel Company. The State Forest Reserve Commission established the Greenwood Forest Tree Nursery (which later became the state park) on part of the land, while the rest was made part of the "Greenwood Reserves" and eventually became part of Rothrock State Forest. The soil was ideally suited for use as a tree nursery after the years of use as an iron furnace. The remnants of fly ash and charcoal dust enriched the earth with minerals that were needed for the growing of trees. The nursery began operation in 1906 and closed in 1993. During the 1970s and 1980s the nursery produced an average of three million seedlings per year. The seedlings were replanted in forests throughout Pennsylvania. The Pennsylvania Bureau of Forestry recently re-established the tree nursery on a limited basis to provide seedlings for use at its other nurseries and for sale to private nurseries.

The state park was formally established by 1924 by the Pennsylvania Bureau of Forestry (although it was then known as "Greenwood Public Camp"). Former residents of Greenwood village had begun to visit their old homes earlier and in 1921 began an annual reunion known as "Old Home Day." Although the Bureau of Forestry made some improvements to the park, most of the facilities at the park were built during the Great Depression by the young men of the Civilian Conservation Corps, established by President Franklin D. Roosevelt. The boys of the CCC worked to restore a furnace stack and also repaired six original buildings that had not been dismantled when the village was abandoned. In the 1930s the name became "Greenwood Furnace State Forest Park". Greenwood Furnace State Park became an official part of the Pennsylvania state park system in 1966.

Archaeological work began at the park in 1976 to uncover the remains of the village. Greenwood Furnace was designated a Historical Landmark in 1995 by ASM International in recognition of the superior quality iron that was produced by Greenwood Iron and was vitally important to the westward expansion of the railroads.

== Recreation ==
Greenwood Furnace State Park provides a look into historic industrial past of north Huntingdon county as well as recreational opportunities similar that of other Pennsylvania State Parks. A walking tour passes through the remains of Greenwood Furnace, providing park visitors with a lesson about the history of the town that once surrounded the ironworks. A working blacksmith shop has historical demonstrations of the craft of blacksmithing.

=== Greenwood Lake ===
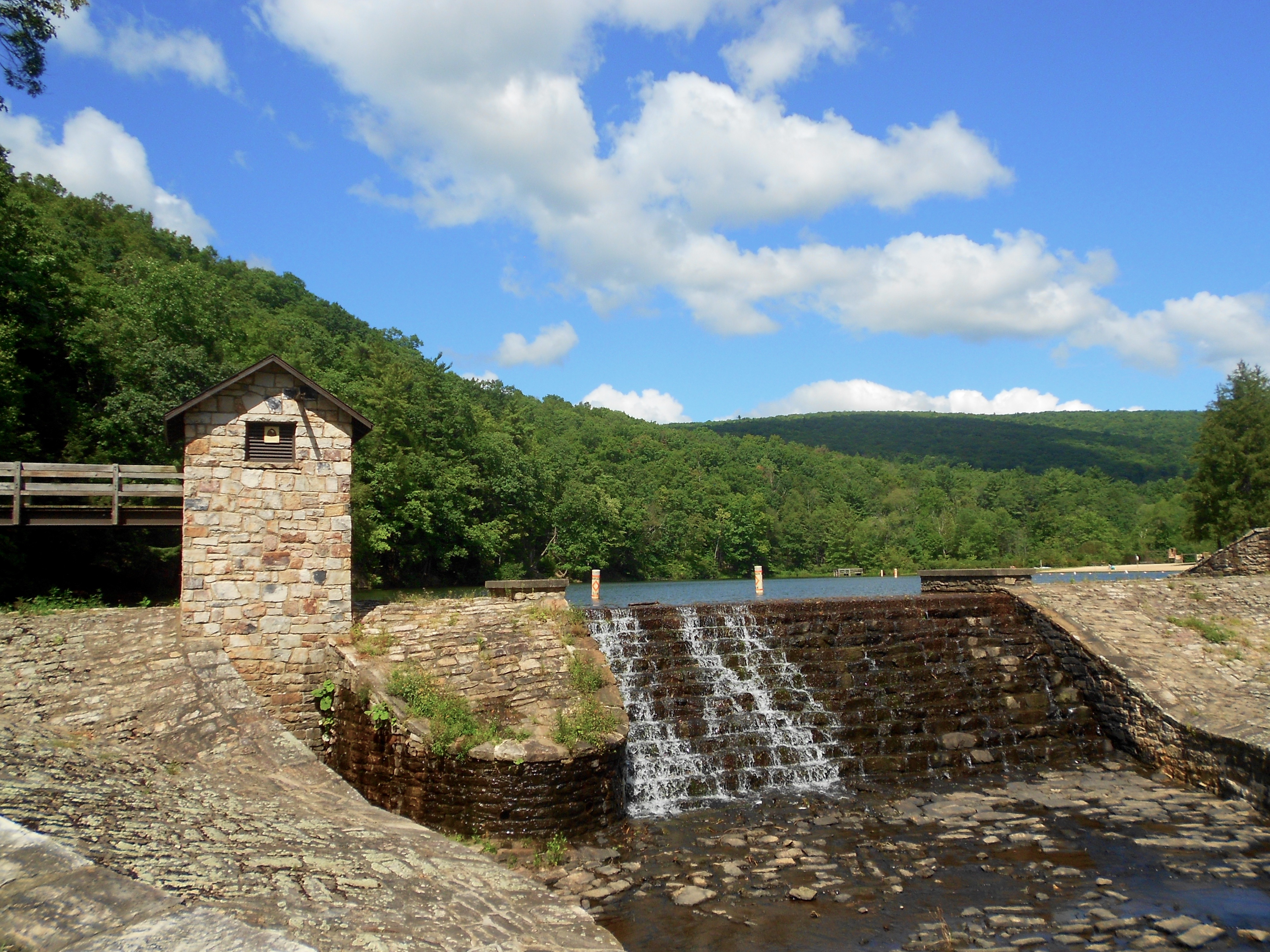
Greenwood Lake Dam

Greenwood Lake was first built to provide water for a gristmill. It stands today as a reminder of the small town that once thrived there. The lake is used for recreational fishing, ice fishing, and swimming. Since 2008, lifeguards have not been posted at the beach.

=== Picnics ===
Greenwood Furnace State Park has a centrally located picnic area in a spruce and pine grove. There are several picnic tables and seven pavilions that can be rented up to eleven months in advance. The picnic area has easy access to a playground, a horseshoe pit, volleyball courts, a snack bar and a softball field.

=== Camping ===
There is a 51 site campground at Greenwood Furnace State Park. It opens at the beginning of trout season in mid-April and closes with the conclusion of deer season in late December. Forty-six of the camp sites have an electric hook-up. A showerhouse with flush toilets and laundry tubs is nearby.

=== Hunting ===
There are about 320 acres (130 ha) acres of woods open to hunting at Greenwood Furnace State Park. Hunters are expected to follow the rules and regulations of the Pennsylvania Game Commission. The common game species are ruffed grouse, squirrels, white-tailed deer, and turkeys. The hunting of groundhogs is prohibited. Hunters may access the adjoining Rothrock State Forest by using the parking lots at Greenwood Furnace State Park and hiking in on the trails.

=== Trails ===
The trails of Greenwood Furnace State Park explore the forests in the park and venture out into surrounding Rothrock State Forest. They also pass by the historical remains of Greenwood Furnace Iron Works. Trails in the park are open to hiking, cross-country skiing, and recreational snowmobiling. Additional state forest trails easily accessible from the park are open to hiking, mountain biking, and horseback riding.

- Chestnut Spring Trail is a 0.5-mile (800 m) "easy/moderate" trail marked with yellow blazes. It passes by several springs, a collier's hut, and a charcoal hearth as it winds its way up a hollow.
- Dogtown Trail is a 1-mile (1.6 km) "easy/moderate" trail marked with blue blazes. The trail is named for the former village of Dogtown, which in turn was named for the dogs that barked at the passing iron ore trains. Dogtown Trail is open for hiking and snowmobiling. The trail begins at the park campground and connects with Brush Ridge Trail.
- Fire Tower Loop is a 7-mile (11 km) "moderate/difficult" trail marked with blue blazes on the Greenwood Spur and red blazes on Ruff Gap and Snowmobile Road. This trail loops through the park and passes by the Greenwood Fire Tower on Broad Mountain, house foundations, and charcoal hearths. Greenwood Tower was built in the 1930s by the CCC and is still used by forest rangers to watch for forest fires.
- Greenwood Trail is a 0.5-mile (800 m) "easy/moderate" trail marked with red blazes. This short loop begins near the picnic area at pavilion six and passes through a diversity of trees, ferns and wildflowers.
- Lakeview Trail is a 0.25-mile (400 m) "easy/moderate" trail marked with white blazes. It runs along part of the edge of Greenwood Lake.
- Monsell Trail is a 1-mile (1.6 km) "moderate" trail marked with yellow blazes. The trail intersects with Greenwood Trail and links the campground to the Standing Stone Trail. Monsell Trail passes through a pine plantation left over from the days of the ironworks.
- Ore Banks Trail is a 1-mile (1.6 km) "moderate" trail marked with yellow and red blazes. It shares part of its trails with Chestnut Springs Trail (yellow blazes) and Brush Ridge Trail (red blazes). Ore Banks Trail passes over the top of a ridge with a view of the park and the remnants of Brush Ridge Ore Banks where iron ore was extracted from the ground and transferred to the furnace. The trail then follows the path used by the mule-drawn railroad that transported the iron ore to the furnace.
- Stone Valley Vista Loop Trail is a 3.5-mile (5.6 km) "moderate" trail marked with blue (Turkey Trail) and orange (Standing Stone Trail) blazes. Part of the trail follows a logging slide used during the days of the iron furnace.
- Viantown Trail is a 0.25-mile (400 m) "moderate" trail marked with yellow blazes. It follows the old wagon road that connected Greenwood Furnace with Viantown and crosses Brush Ridge.

Greenwood Furnace State Park is also a trail head for two much longer backpacking trails that pass through the Appalachian Mountains of Pennsylvania. The Pennsylvania Mid State Trail is a 522.6-kilometre (324.7 mi) trail that runs from the Maryland state line to the New York state line near Lawrenceville, Pennsylvania and connects to the park via the Greenwood Spur. The Standing Stone Trail is a 72-mile (116 km) backpacking trail that connects the park to the Tuscarora Trail, which in turn connects with the Appalachian Trail.
