= Shaver Creek (Pennsylvania) =

Watercourse in the United States

Coordinates: 40.56455°N 78.04722°W

Shaver's Creek is a 19.6-mile-long (31.5 km) tributary of the Juniata River in Huntingdon County, Pennsylvania in the United States.

Shaver's Creek joins the Juniata River at the borough of Petersburg.

The creek gives its name to the Shaver's Creek Environmental Center.

== History ==
The creek was named for Peter Shaver, an original settler in that area within the Juniata Valley. Family genealogy research show "Hans Pieter" arriving in America aboard the ship, Loyal Judith in 1732. He was licensed as a fur trapper/Indian trader in Fredericktown, MD by the PA Colony Council in 1744. Little is known of his life, but he was described as dying in “a most singular manner” after being found decapitated near his home. His murder proved to be a significant mystery at the time because his head was never recovered after extensive searches of the area.

In 1769, a tract consisting of "2000 acres, and 1200 ditto, on Shaver's Creek, in Barree, belonging to Reuben Haines, [and valued at 1200 pounds]" was included in a list of "tracts of located and unimproved lands" to be sold, because of unpaid taxes owed to the British crown.

During the American Revolutionary War, an energetic settler in the area named Samuel Anderson, who had also married Peter's widow, Rhoda, erected a blockhouse fort on the flat near the mouth of the creek which was occupied during the war.

== See also ==
- List of rivers of Pennsylvania
