= Jackson Township, Huntingdon County, Pennsylvania =

Township in Pennsylvania, US

Coordinates: 40°42′00″N 77°52′59″W

- Township
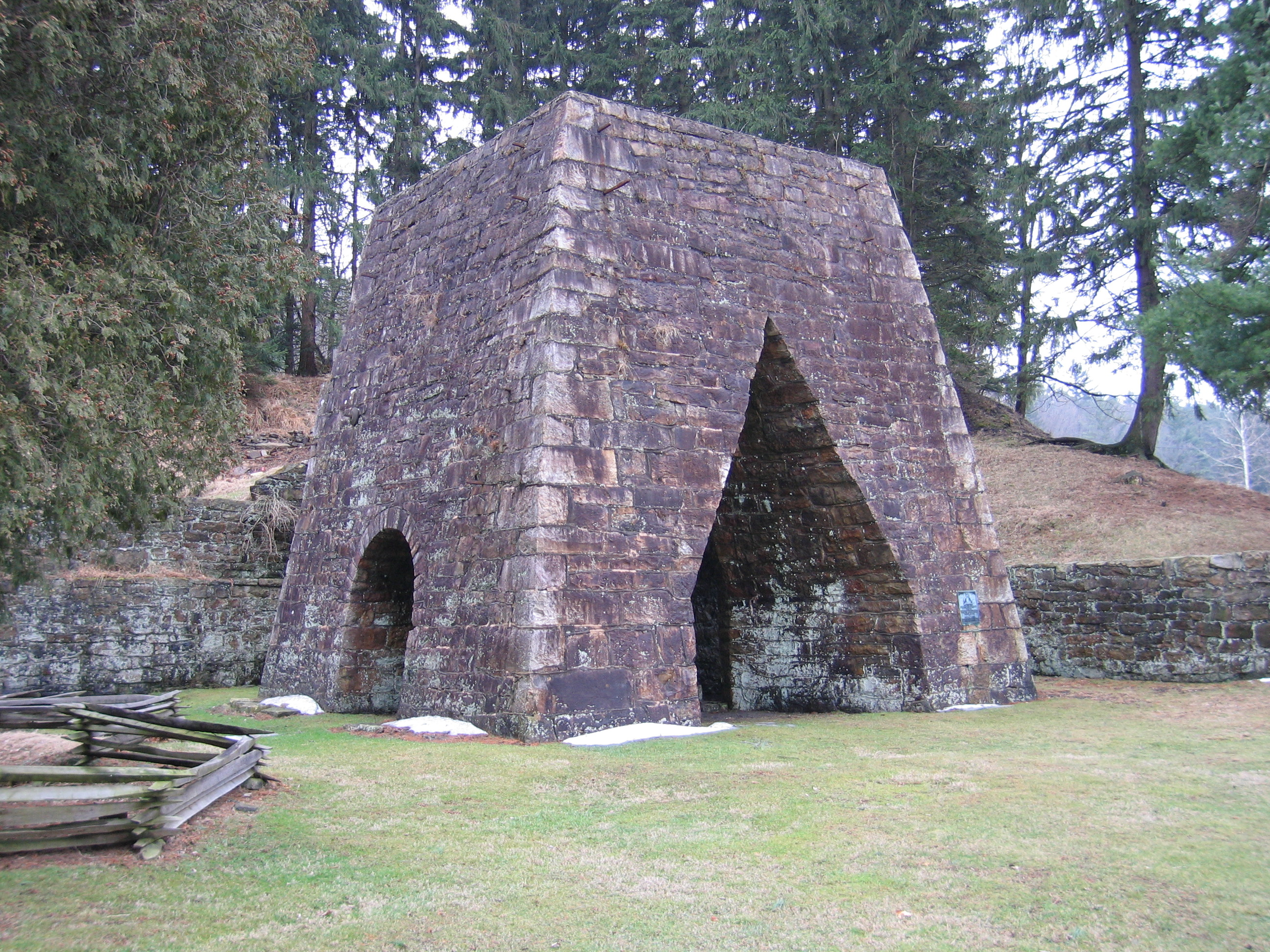
- Greenwood Furnace State Park is in Jackson Township

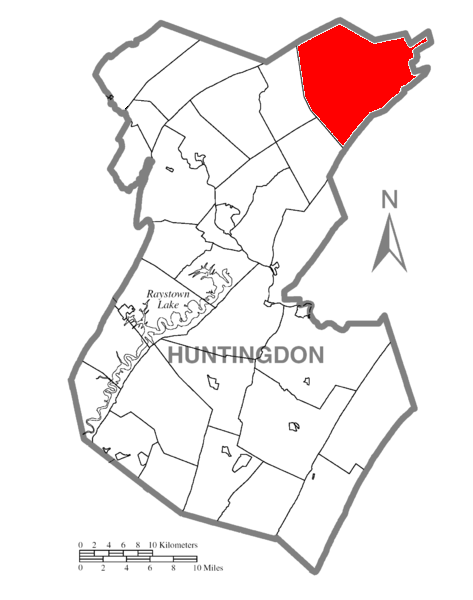
- Map of Huntingdon County, Pennsylvania Highlighting Jackson Township

- Map of Huntingdon County, Pennsylvania
- Country: United States
- State: Pennsylvania
- County: Huntingdon

Area
  - Total: 72.52 sq mi (187.82 km^{2})
  - Land: 72.49 sq mi (187.74 km^{2})
  - Water: 0.031 sq mi (0.08 km^{2})

Population (2020)
  - Total: 859 ▼
  - Estimate (2022): 906
  - Density: 11.9/sq mi (4.58/km^{2})
- Time zone: UTC-5 (Eastern (EST))
  - Summer (DST): UTC-4 (EDT)
- Zip code: 16652
- Area code: 814
- FIPS code: 42-061-37384
- Website: https://jackson-township.org/
- Local phone exchanges: 667

Jackson Township is an American township that is located in Huntingdon County, Pennsylvania. The population was 859 at the time of the 2020 census.

Greenwood Furnace State Park is a Pennsylvania state park in Jackson Township.

== Geography ==
According to the United States Census Bureau, the township has a total area of 72.5 square miles (188 km^{2}), of which 72.5 square miles (188 km^{2}) is land and 0.1 square miles (0.26 km^{2}) (0.08%) is water.

== Demographics ==
Historical population
Census	Pop.	Note	%±
2000	882		—
2010	872		−1.1%
2020	859		−1.5%
2022 (est.)	906		5.5%
U.S. Decennial Census

As of the census of 2000, there were 882 people, 346 households, and 269 families residing in the township.

The population density was 12.2 people per square mile (4.7/km^{2}). There were 675 housing units at an average density of 9.3/sq mi (3.6/km^{2}).

The racial makeup of the township was 98.30% White, 0.11% African American, 0.11% Asian, 0.45% from other races, and 1.02% from two or more races. Hispanic or Latino of any race were 0.34% of the population.

There were 346 households, out of which 28.9% had children under the age of eighteen living with them; 67.6% were married couples living together, 5.8% had a female householder with no husband present, and 22.0% were non-families. 19.1% of all households were made up of individuals, and 7.5% had someone living alone who was sixty-five years of age or older.

The average household size was 2.55 and the average family size was 2.90.

Within the township, the population was spread out, with 23.1% who were under the age of eighteen, 5.7% who were aged eighteen to twenty-four, 29.1% who were aged twenty-five to forty-four, 29.9% who were aged forty-five to sixty-four, and 12.1% who were sixty-five years of age or older. The median age was forty years.

For every one hundred females, there were 99.1 males. For every one hundred females who were aged eighteen or older, there were 101.2 males.

The median income for a household in the township was $43,875, and the median income for a family was $49,583. Males had a median income of $33,125 compared with that of $26,125 for females.

The per capita income for the township was $21,065.

Approximately 3.3% of families and 3.6% of the population were living below the poverty line, including 13.7% of those who were aged sixty-five or older. None of the individuals who were aged eighteen or younger were identified as impoverished.

== Gallery ==
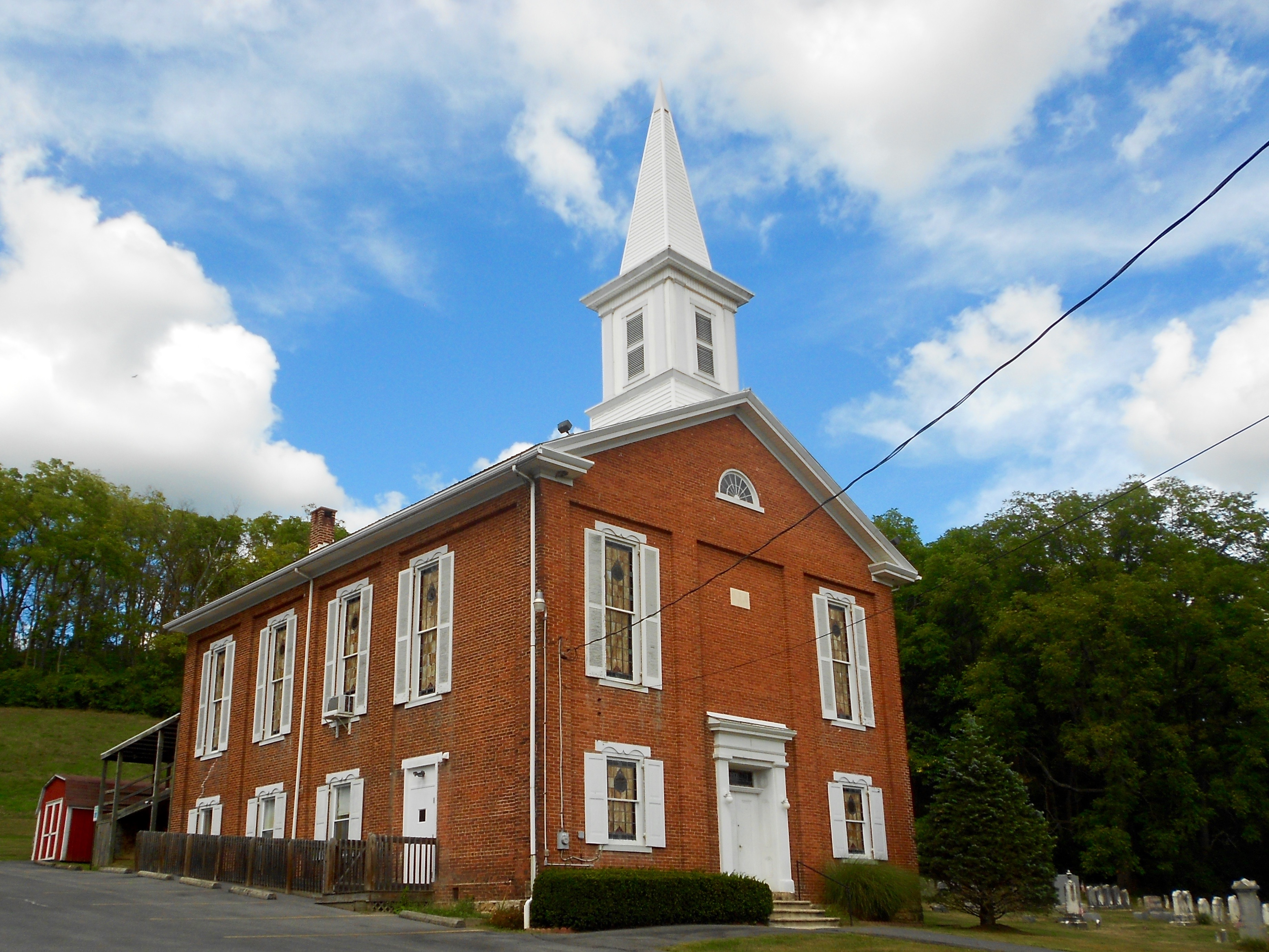
Ennisville United Methodist Church
