= Pennsylvania Route 655 =

State highway in Pennsylvania, US

Pennsylvania Route 655

Route information
- Maintained by PennDOT
- Length: 82.916 mi (133.440 km)
- Existed: Spring 1964–present

Major junctions
- South end: North Pennsylvania Avenue at Maryland state line in Thompson Township
- PA 484 in Thompson Township; US 522 in Needmore; US 30 in Harrisonville; PA 913 in Waterfall; PA 994 near Saltillo; PA 829 near Saltillo; US 22 from Mapleton to Mill Creek; PA 305 in Belleville; US 322 in Reedsville
- North end: SR 1005 in Reedsville

Location
- Country: United States
- State: Pennsylvania
- Counties: Fulton, Huntingdon, Mifflin

Highway system
- Pennsylvania State Route System; Interstate; US; State; Scenic; Legislative
← PA 654	→ PA 660
← I-76	PA 76	→ PA 77

Pennsylvania Route 655 (PA 655) is an 83-mile-long (134 km) north–south state highway located in central Pennsylvania. The southern terminus of the route is at the Mason–Dixon line in Thompson Township, where the road becomes a local road (North Pennsylvania Avenue) in Hancock, Maryland. The northern terminus is at State Route 1005 (SR 1005), the former alignment of U.S. Route 322 (US 322), in Reedsville.

== Route description ==
=== Fulton County ===
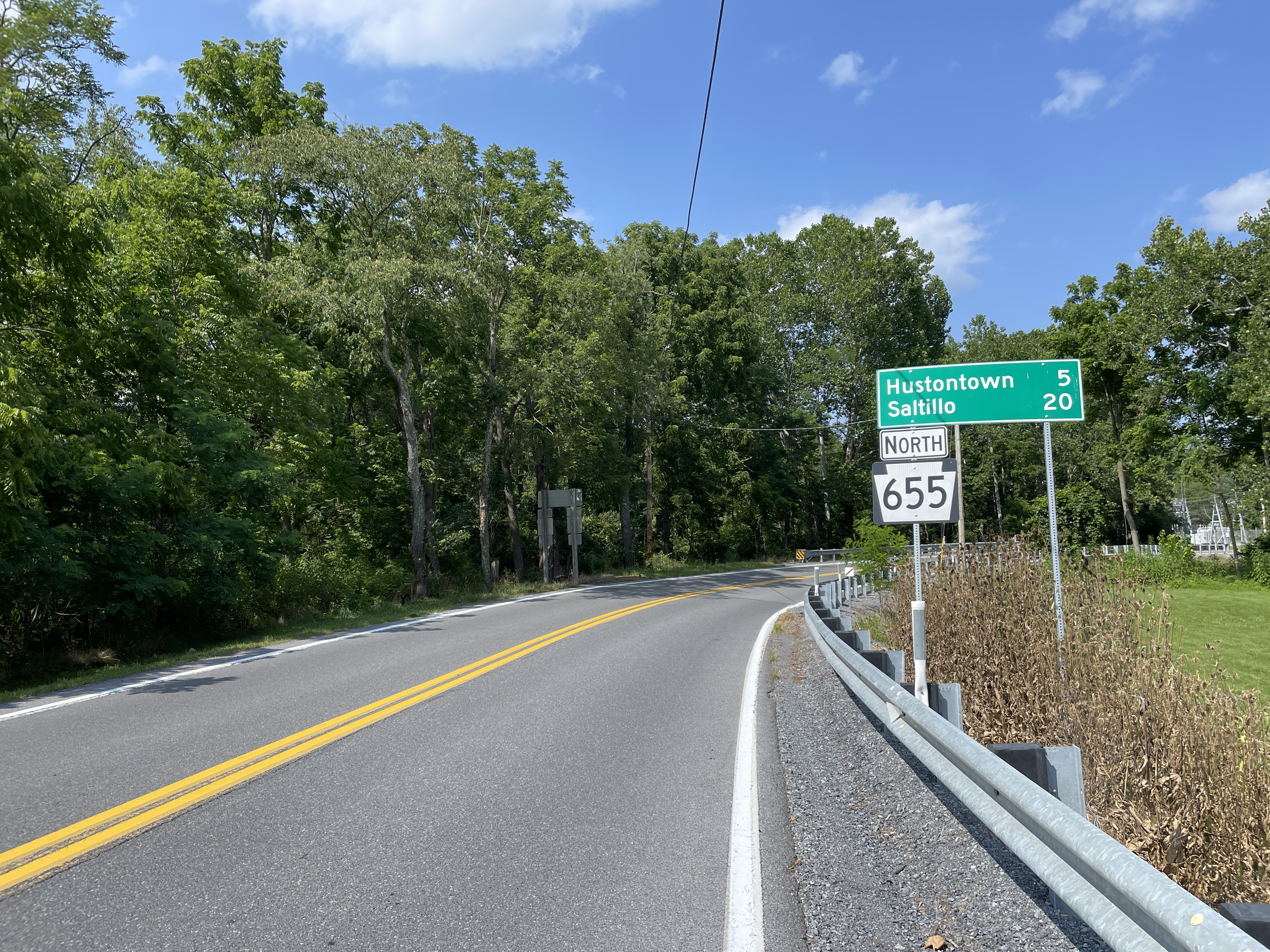
PA 655 northbound past US 30 in Harrisonville

PA 655 begins at the Maryland border in Thompson Township in Fulton County, where the road continues south into that state as North Pennsylvania Avenue toward the town of Hancock. From the state line, the route heads north on two-lane undivided Thompson Road, passing through a mix of farmland and woodland with some homes. The road intersects the eastern terminus of PA 484 and continues through more rural areas, bending to the north-northeast. PA 655 crosses into Belfast Township and runs through agricultural areas and woods before it bends west and heads into the residential community of Needmore, where it comes to an intersection with US 522. At this point, PA 655 turns north for a concurrency with US 522 on Great Cove Road, passing through a mix of farmland and development and curving northeast and east. PA 655 splits from US 522 by turning north onto Pleasant Ridge Road and heading into forested areas. The road curves northeast and north, continuing through a mix of farm fields and woodland with a few residences. The route curves northwest and northeast before it reaches the community of Pleasant Ridge. PA 655 enters Licking Creek Township and turns northeast and southeast as it runs through farmland and woodland. The route turns north to remain along Pleasant Ridge Road and heads north-northeast through forested areas with some farm fields and homes, passing through the community of Andover. The road winds through more rural areas a short distance to the west of Licking Creek, reaching an intersection with US 30 in the community of Harrisonville.

Past the US 30 intersection, PA 655 winds north-northeast through forests with some farmland, crossing into Dublin Township. Here, the road turns to the northwest and winds through more rural land before coming to a bridge over I-76 (Pennsylvania Turnpike). Following this, the route heads north and crosses into Taylor Township, where it runs through residential areas in the community of Hustontown. PA 655 comes to an intersection with SR 4014 (Pitt Street), which heads east a short distance to connect to PA 475, at which point PA 655 turns west onto Pitt Street. The route leaves Hustontown and becomes Waterfall Road, heading through farmland with some homes and curving northwest. The road runs through forested areas before it passes through agricultural areas and turns to the north. PA 655 runs through a mix of farm fields and woodland, passing through the community of Gracey. Farther north, the route passes through forests and comes to a junction with the eastern terminus of PA 913 in the community of Waterfall, where it turns east-southeast to remain along Waterfall Road. The road runs between farmland to the north and forested areas to the south before making a turn to the north.

=== Huntingdon and Mifflin counties ===
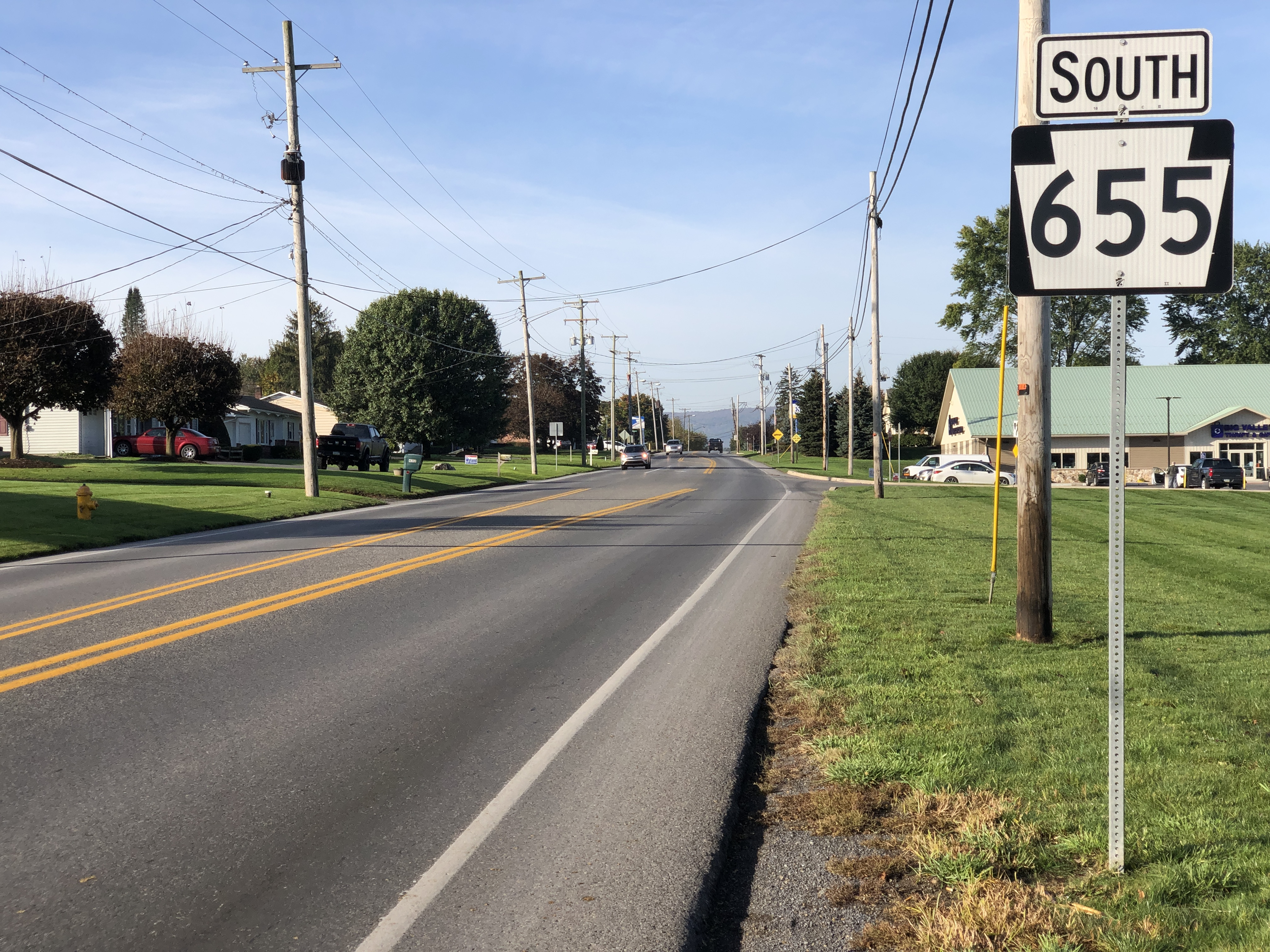
PA 655 southbound in Belleville

PA 655 enters Clay Township in Huntingdon County and heads north through farmland with some homes before turning northeast and northwest. The road curves north and passes through forested areas. Farther north, the route runs through wooded areas with some fields and turns to the northeast. PA 655 winds northeast through woodland before it heads into agricultural areas and curves north, coming to an intersection with PA 994. At this point, PA 994 turns north for a short concurrency with PA 655 before splitting to the west. Following this, PA 655 runs through more farmland before it enters the borough of Saltillo. At this point, the road becomes Main Street and is lined with homes. The route leaves Saltillo for Clay Township again and becomes an unnamed road, passing through a mix of farm fields and woodland with some residences. PA 655 crosses into Cass Township and reaches an intersection with the southern terminus of PA 829 in the community of Knightsville. Past this intersection, the route becomes Hares Valley Road and runs through a narrow valley between Clear Ridge to the west and Jacks Mountain to the east. The road heads north-northeast through farmland with some homes in the valley. Farther north, PA 655 passes through the community of Barneytown (also known as Latta Grove) and heads into Union Township, where it continues into more forested areas with some fields and residences.

PA 655 enters the borough of Mapleton and becomes Campbell Street, heading into residential areas and turning southeast onto Main Street. The route turns northeast onto Bridge Street and passes under Norfolk Southern's Pittsburgh Line before it comes to a bridge over the Juniata River, at which point it leaves Mapleton for Brady Township. After the bridge, PA 655 turns north onto Oriskany Road, running through forested areas to the east of the river. The road heads north-northeast further away from the river and passes east of an industrial plant before it comes to an intersection with US 22. At this point, PA 655 heads north concurrent with US 22 on William Penn Highway, which carries one northbound lane and two southbound lanes. The road passes through forests to the east of the Juniata River and Norfolk Southern's Pittsburgh Line. The two routes curve northeast away from the river and railroad tracks, becoming a three-lane road with two northbound lanes and one southbound lane. The road turns to the north-northwest and narrows to two lanes before entering the borough of Mill Creek, where it passes development and gains a center left-turn lane. PA 655 splits from US 22 by turning northeast onto two-lane undivided Big Valley Pike, running through residential areas. The road leaves Mill Creek for Brady Township and heads north-northeast through forests before turning northeast through the community of Fousetown. The route turns east into wooded areas with some residences before a curve to the northeast. PA 655 heads into the Kishacoquillas Valley, an agricultural valley between Stone Mountain to the northwest and Jacks Mountain to the southeast which is home to an Amish community. After entering the valley, the route runs through farm fields with some homes and passes through the communities of Airydale and Sharpsburg.

PA 655 enters Menno Township in Mifflin County and continues northeast through agricultural areas in the Kishacoquillas Valley as an unnamed road. The route runs through the community of Allensville on Main Street, where it passes homes and a few businesses. After leaving Allensville, PA 655 heads back into farmland as an unnamed road. Farther northeast, the road passes through the community of Menno before it crosses into Union Township. The route becomes West Main Street and runs through farmland with some development before it reaches the community of Belleville. Here, PA 655 heads into residential areas and comes to an intersection with the eastern terminus of PA 305. Following this intersection, The route passes homes and businesses in the center of Belleville and becomes East Main Street. The road passes more development before it leaves Belleville and runs through agricultural areas. PA 655 becomes an unnamed road as it continues northeast through rural land, running through the community of Kishacoquillas. The road heads into Brown Township and runs through more farmland with some homes, passing through the community of Cedar Hill. Farther northeast, the route passes businesses and becomes a divided highway, curving east to reach a diamond interchange with the US 322 freeway. PA 655 widens to four lanes and comes to its northern terminus at an intersection with SR 1005 (Tea Creek Road/North Main Street) north of the community of Reedsville.

== History ==
Most of PA 655 was once Pennsylvania Route 76. From 1928 to Spring 1964, PA 76 occupied what is now PA 655 from the Maryland state line to Pennsylvania Route 829 in Cass Township, as well as PA 829 from Cass Township to Mill Creek and PA 655 from Mill Creek to Reedsville. The section of present PA 655 between Saltillo and Mill Creek was designated part of PA 376. In spring 1964, PA 655 was assigned to its current alignment, replacing the PA 76 and PA 376 designations. This change was made to remove numbering conflicts that resulted from the designation of I-76 and I-376 in Pennsylvania.

== Major intersections ==
County	Location	mi	km	Destinations	Notes
Fulton	Thompson Township	0.000	0.000	North Pennsylvania Avenue – Hancock	Maryland state line; southern terminus
Fulton	Thompson Township	2.075	3.339	PA 484 west – Warfordsburg	Eastern terminus of PA 484
Fulton	Belfast Township	8.969	14.434	US 522 south – Warfordsburg	South end of US 522 concurrency
Fulton	Belfast Township	9.815	15.796	US 522 north – McConnellsburg	South end of US 522 concurrency
Fulton	Licking Creek Township	21.161	34.055	US 30 (Lincoln Highway) – McConnellsburg, Breezewood	
Fulton	Taylor Township	26.474	42.606	SR 4014 (Pitt Street) to PA 475 – Fort Littleton, Orbisonia	
Fulton	Taylor Township	33.368	53.701	PA 913 north (New Grenada Highway) – Saxton	Southern terminus of PA 913
Huntingdon	Clay Township	40.026	64.416	PA 994 east (Church Street) – Three Springs	South end of PA 994 concurrency
Huntingdon	Clay Township	40.126	64.577	PA 994 west (Old Plank Road) – Entriken	North end of PA 994 concurrency
Huntingdon	Cass Township	43.395	69.837	PA 829 north – Cassville	Southern terminus of PA 829
Huntingdon	Brady Township	56.794	91.401	US 22 east (William Penn Highway) – Mount Union	South end of US 22 concurrency
Huntingdon	Mill Creek	58.207	93.675	US 22 west (William Penn Highway) – Huntingdon	North end of US 22 concurrency
Mifflin	Union Township	74.605	120.065	PA 305 west (Greenwood Road) – McAlveys Fort	Eastern terminus of PA 305
Mifflin	Brown Township	82.703	133.098	US 322 – Lewistown, State College	Interchange
Mifflin	Brown Township	82.916	133.440	SR 1005 (Tea Creek Road / North Main Street) – Milroy, Reedsville, Yeagertown	Old US 322; northern terminus
1.000 mi = 1.609 km; 1.000 km = 0.621 mi: Concurrency terminus

== PA 655 Truck ==
Pennsylvania Route 655 Truck
- Location: Hustontown

Pennsylvania Route 655 Truck is a truck route of PA 655 that bypasses a weight-restricted bridge over Saddlers Run on which trucks over 36 tons and combination loads over 40 tons are prohibited. It was signed in 2013.
