= Pennsylvania Route 475 =

State highway in Pennsylvania, US

Pennsylvania Route 475

Route information
- Maintained by PennDOT
- Length: 19.619 mi (31.574 km)
- Existed: Spring 1964–present

Major junctions
- South end: US 522 in Dublin Township
- North end: PA 994 near Rockhill Furnace

Location
- Country: United States
- State: Pennsylvania
- Counties: Fulton, Huntingdon

Highway system
- Pennsylvania State Route System; Interstate; US; State; Scenic; Legislative
| ← PA 474 | → I-476 |
| ← I-176 | PA 176 | → PA 177 |

Pennsylvania Route 475 (PA 475) is a 19.6-mile-long (31.5 km) state highway located in Fulton and Huntingdon counties in Pennsylvania. The southern terminus is at US 522 in Dublin Township. The northern terminus is at PA 994 near Rockhill Furnace. The route was created in 1964, replacing Pennsylvania Route 176 due to the designation of Interstate 176 (I-176) in Pennsylvania.

== Route description ==
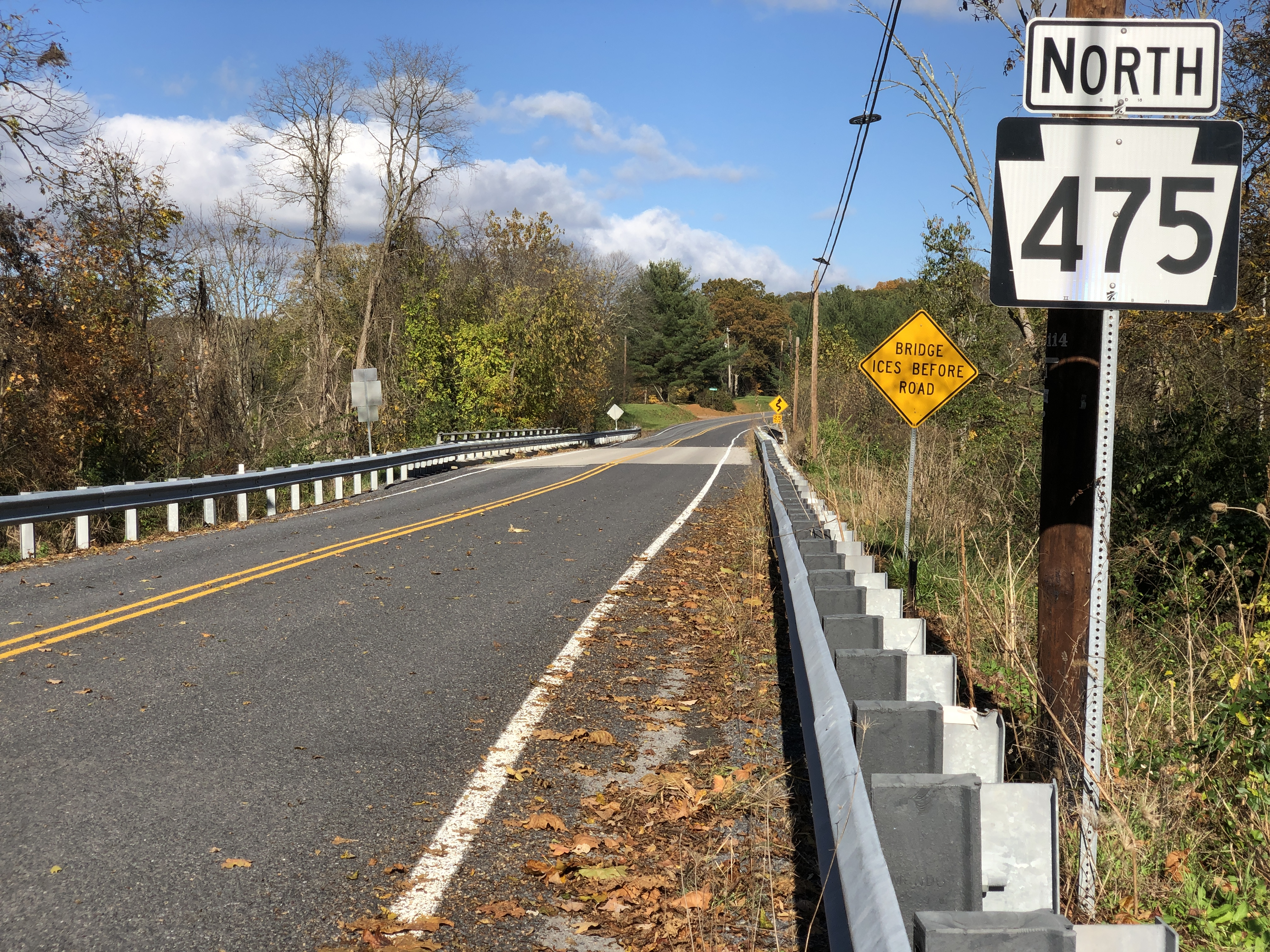
PA 475 northbound in Springfield Township

PA 475 begins at an intersection with US 522 in Dublin Township, Fulton County, heading west on two-lane undivided Waterfall Road. The road passes through a mix of farmland and woodland, turning to the north before heading northwest and coming to a bridge over I-76 (Pennsylvania Turnpike). The route winds through more rural areas before heading west and coming to the community of Hustontown. At this point, the road continues a short distance west as State Route 4014 (Pitt Street) to connect to PA 655 and PA 475 turns northeast onto North Clear Ridge Road, becoming the border between Taylor Township to the west and Dublin Township to the east. The road passes through rural areas of homes prior to heading into a mix of agricultural and wooded areas with some homes, passing through Clear Ridge.

PA 475 crosses into Springfield Township in Huntingdon County, becoming an unnamed road and heading into forested areas, curving to the east before a turn back to the north. The route turns east and heads into a mix of fields and woods, turning to the northeast at Maddensville, curving to the north. The road turns northeast again to cross the Little Aughwick Creek and heads east from here, passing through woods. PA 475 heads north into agricultural areas to the west of Blacklog Mountain, continuing into forested areas as it runs to the east of Aughwick Creek. The creek heads farther west from the road as it heads into more wooded areas with some fields. The route turns to the north-northeast at Meadow Gap and heads through more forests. Farther north, the road continues through more wooded areas with some agricultural clearings, with the Aughwick Creek to the west of the road. PA 475 enters Cromwell Township and runs farther east from the creek, heading through woodland with some farms and homes. The route turns west to reach its northern terminus at an intersection with PA 994.

== History ==
PA 176 was renumbered to PA 475 in spring 1964 as a result of the designation of I-176 in Pennsylvania.

== Major intersections ==
| County | Location | mi | km | Destinations | Notes |
|---|---|---|---|---|---|
| Fulton | Dublin Township | 0.000 | 0.000 | US 522 (Great Cove Road) – McConnellsburg, Mount Union | Southern terminus |
| Fulton | Dublin Township | 3.760 | 6.051 | SR 4014 (Pitt Street) to PA 655 – Saltillo | |
| Huntingdon | Cromwell Township | 19.619 | 31.574 | PA 994 (Hudson Street) – Three Springs, Orbisonia | Northern terminus |
1.000 mi = 1.609 km; 1.000 km = 0.621 mi
