= Pennsylvania Route 747 =

State highway in Pennsylvania, US

Pennsylvania Route 747

Route information
- Maintained by PennDOT
- Length: 15.28 mi (24.59 km)
- Existed: Spring 1964–present

Major junctions
- South end: PA 994 in Three Springs
- North end: US 22 in Mount Union

Location
- Country: United States
- State: Pennsylvania
- Counties: Huntingdon, Mifflin

Highway system
- Pennsylvania State Route System; Interstate; US; State; Scenic; Legislative
← PA 746	→ PA 752

Pennsylvania Route 747 (PA 747) is a 15.28-mile-long (24.59 km) state highway located in Huntingdon and Mifflin counties in Pennsylvania, United States. The southern terminus is at PA 994 in Three Springs. The northern terminus is at U.S. Route 22 (US 22) in Mount Union.

== Route description ==
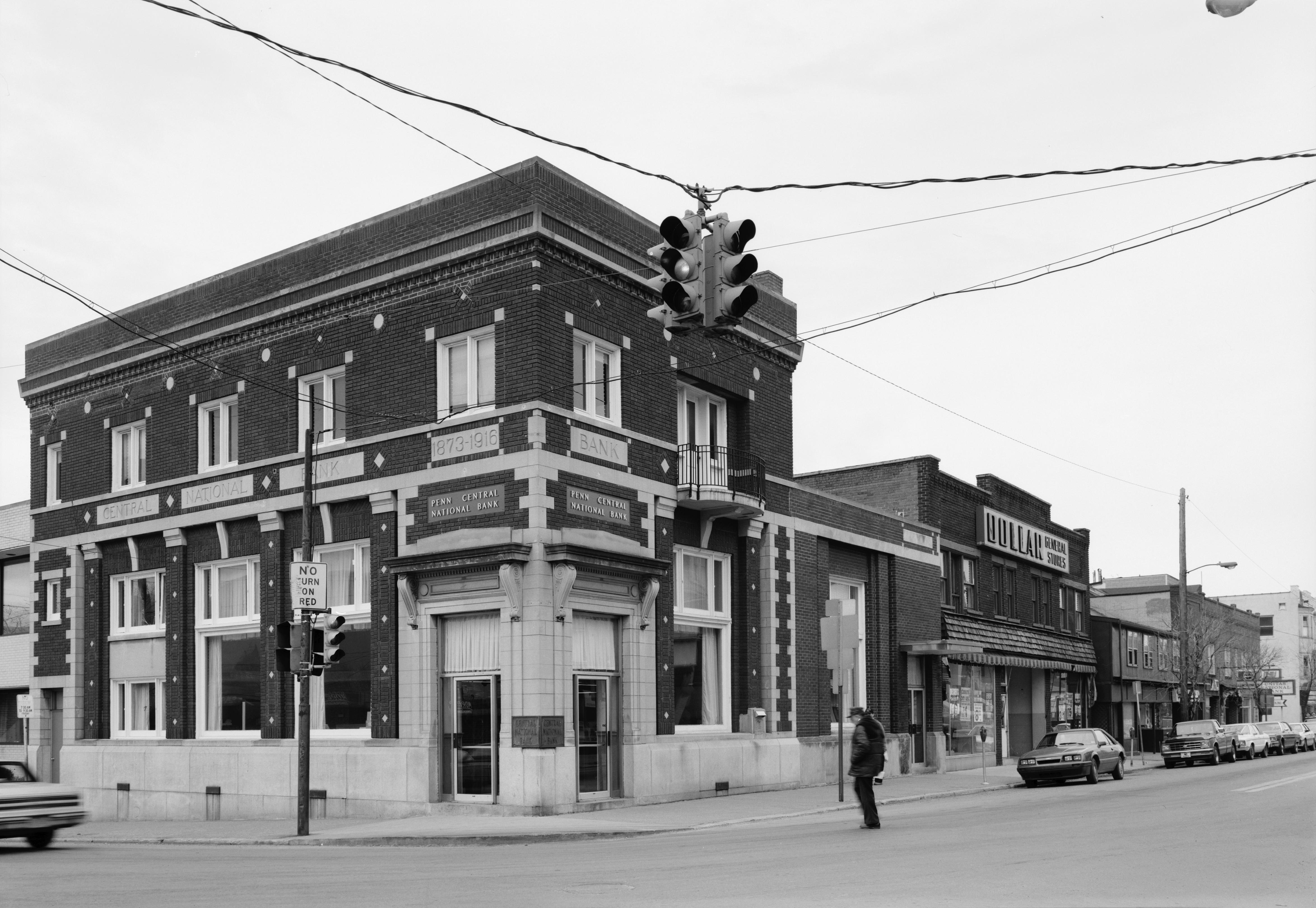
Eastward along PA 747 from the Jefferson Street intersection in downtown Mount Union

PA 747 begins at an intersection with PA 994 in the borough of Three Springs in Huntingdon County, heading northeast on two-lane undivided Church Street. The road passes homes before becoming an unnamed road and passing through farmland with some homes. The route briefly passes through Clay Township before heading into Cromwell Township and running north-northeast through wooded areas with some fields and homes. PA 747 continues through a narrow agricultural valley to the east of Jacks Mountain that contains some wooded areas and residences, passing through Cora before crossing into Shirley Township. In this area, the road continues through more of the rural valley. Farther north, the route becomes Hill Valley Road and passes through more rural areas prior to reaching the borough of Mount Union. At this point, PA 747 becomes South Division Street and passes homes. The route turns northwest onto West Shirley Street and runs through the downtown area, turning northeast onto North Jefferson Street. The road heads past homes and businesses, crossing the East Broad Top Connecting Railroad and passing under Norfolk Southern's Pittsburgh Line. The route passes through more residential areas and turns to the north. PA 747 crosses the Juniata River into Wayne Township in Mifflin County and ends at an intersection with US 22.

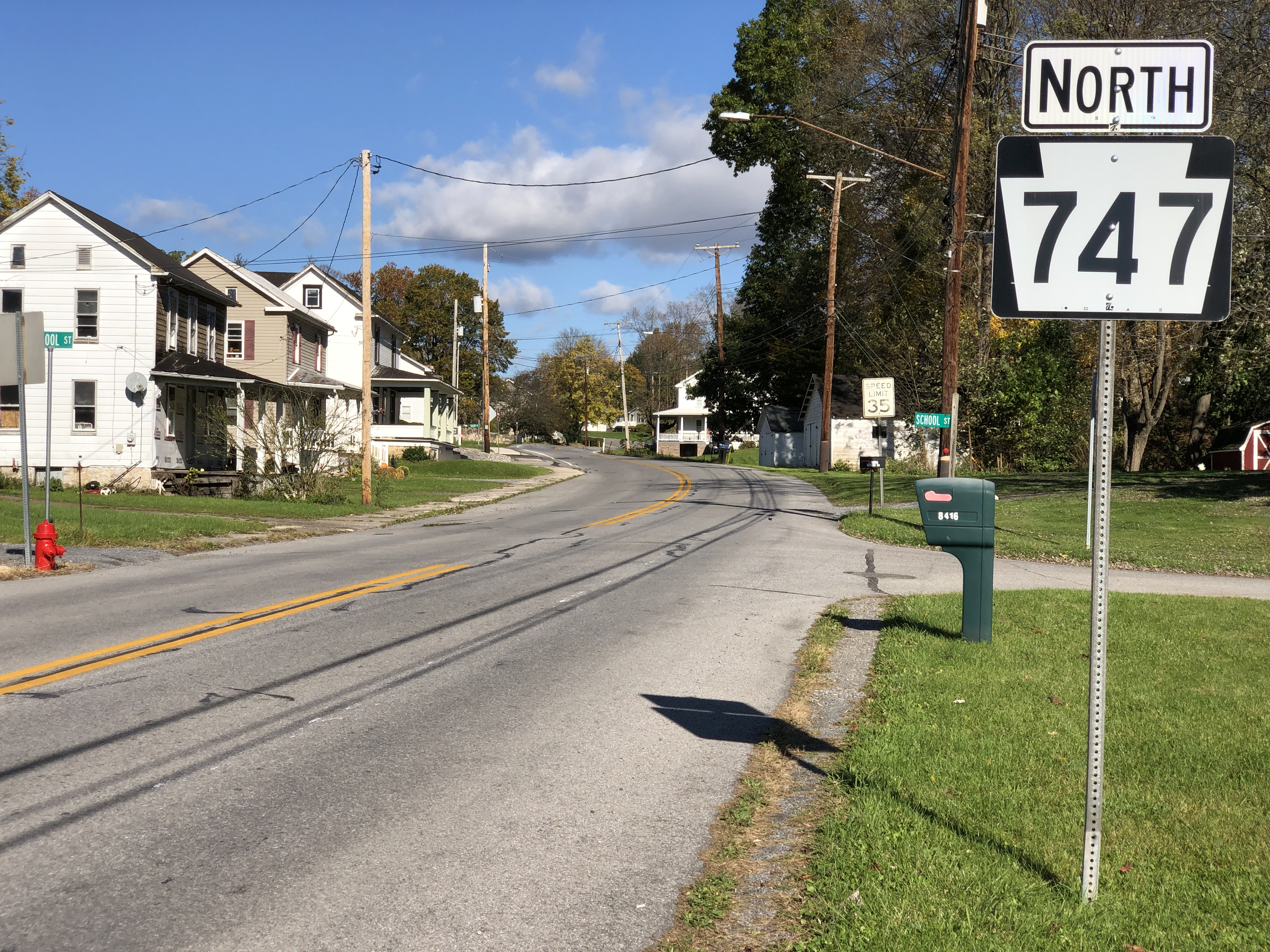
PA 747 northbound in Three Springs

== History ==
PA 276 was renumbered to PA 747 in spring 1964 as a result of the designation of I-276 in Pennsylvania.

== Major intersections ==
County	Location	mi	km	Destinations	Notes
Huntingdon	Three Springs	0.00	0.00	PA 994 (Church Street / Hudson Street) – Entriken, Orbisonia, Saltillo	Southern terminus
Mifflin	Wayne Township	15.28	24.59	US 22 – Huntingdon, Lewistown	Northern terminus
1.000 mi = 1.609 km; 1.000 km = 0.621 mi
