= Pennsylvania Route 994 =

State highway in Huntingdon County, Pennsylvania, US

Pennsylvania Route 994

Route information
- Maintained by PennDOT
- Length: 27.497 mi (44.252 km)

Major junctions
- West end: PA 26 in Entriken
- PA 655 near Saltillo; PA 747 in Three Springs; PA 475 near Rockhill
- East end: US 522 in Orbisonia

Location
- Country: United States
- State: Pennsylvania
- Counties: Huntingdon

Highway system
- Pennsylvania State Route System; Interstate; US; State; Scenic; Legislative
← PA 993	→ PA 995

Pennsylvania Route 994 (PA 994) is a highway in Pennsylvania, United States, which runs for 27 1/2 miles (44.3 km). It runs from PA 26 in Entriken to U.S. Route 522 (US 522) in Orbisonia.

This highway crosses Raystown Lake via a bridge over the lake. Fireworks are held at the Raystown Lake Resort on Memorial Day Weekend, July 3 and the Sunday night before Labor Day. The fireworks at the resort are watched on the lake but they can be seen from the bridge because the resort is just south of the PA 994 bridge which crosses Raystown Lake.

== Route description ==
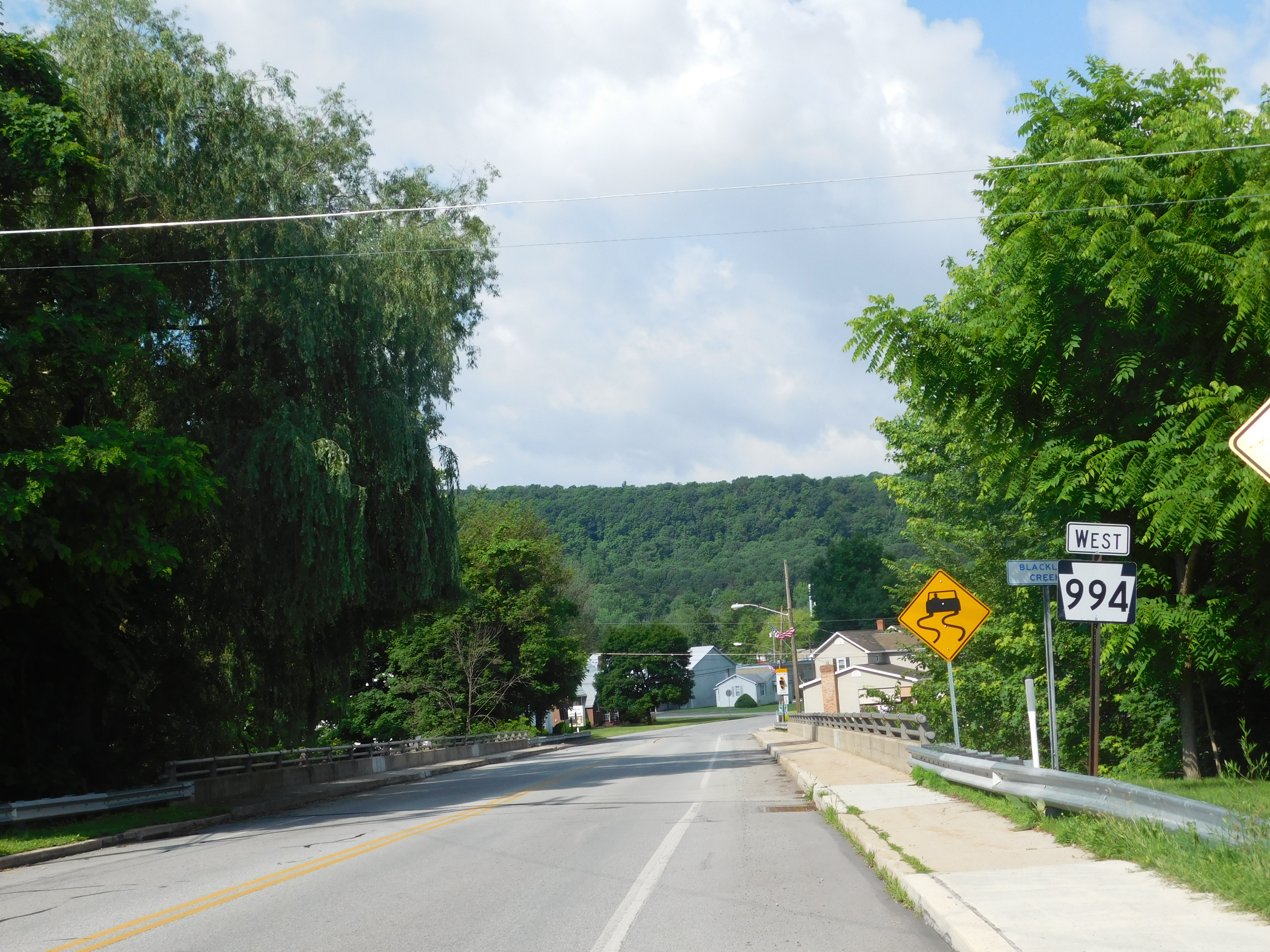
PA 994 westbound in Orbisonia

Traveling east from Entriken, the route travels to the southeast before turning to the north and making a U-turn to parallel the shore of Raystown Lake. PA 994 then crosses the lake twice, once on a small bridge crossing a small "finger" of the lake and the second time on a bridge that is combination of a land bridge and a man-made bridge. Following the second crossing, the route returns to a southeasterly path.

For the next 4.5 miles (7.2 km), PA 994 parallels the southern border of the Trough Creek State Park, turning to the south in the progress. The route returns east near State Route 3019 (SR 3019) in Cooks before taking an erratic path eastward due to the terrain up to an intersection with PA 655 south of the borough of Saltillo. After forming a short 170-yard (160 m) concurrency with PA 655, PA 994 continues east to the borough of Three Springs.

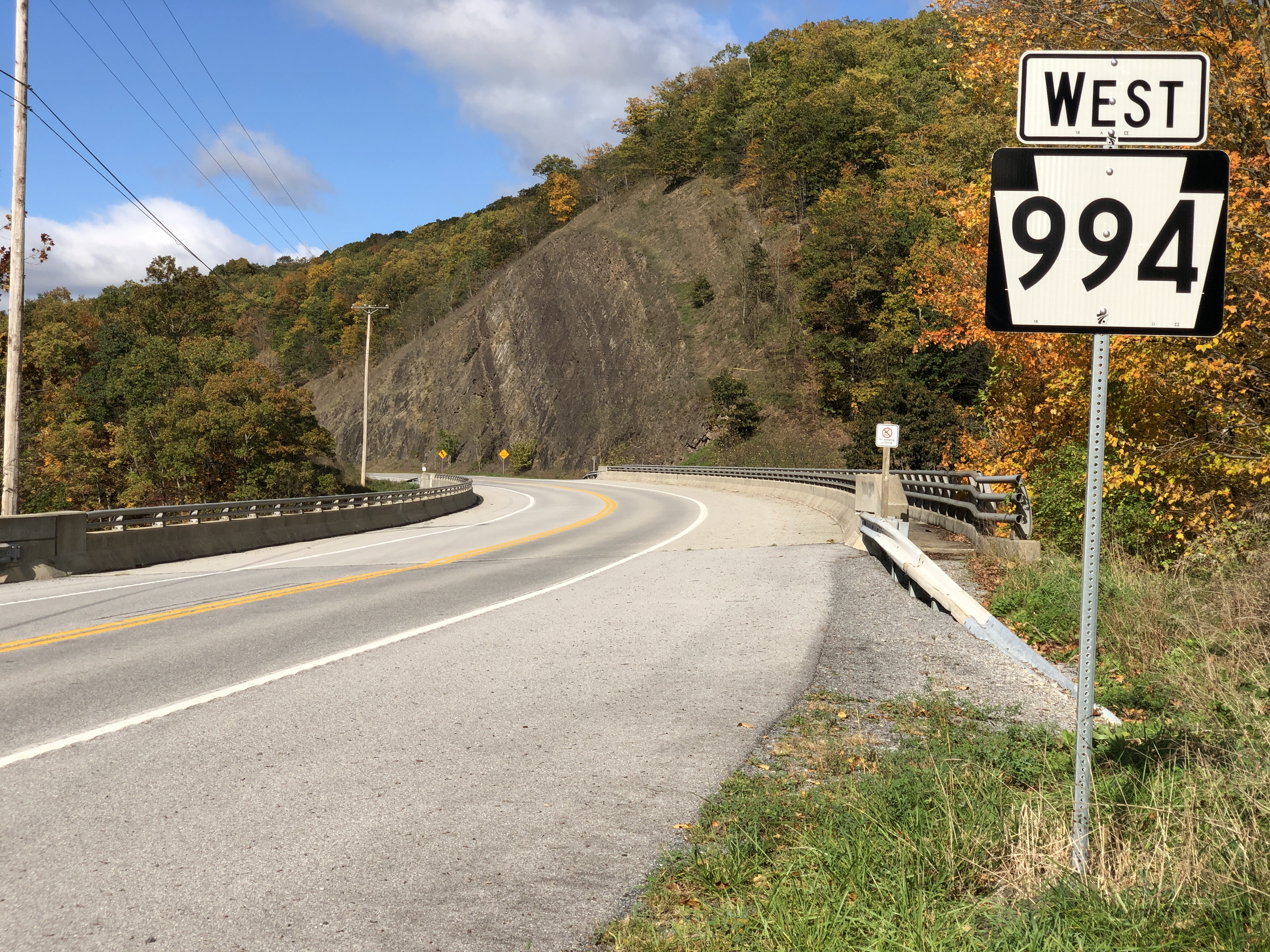
PA 994 westbound in Lincoln Township

In the center of Three Springs, PA 994 intersects the southern terminus of PA 747 and the former southern terminus of PA 829. PA 994 takes the south exit at this intersection, curving to the east outside of town and gradually shifts northeast toward the borough of Orbisonia.

Southwest of Orbisonia, PA 994 intersects the northern terminus PA 475. From this point, PA 994 runs north–south before jutting back to the east in Orbisonia towards its eastern terminus at US 522.

== History ==
Signed in 1928. In 1932, the route was paved. In 1936, the route was moved from the PA 915 alignment and SR 4006 to Houstontown to its current location between Entriken to Robertsdale. In spring 1964, the eastern terminus moved from PA 913 north of Robertsdale to its current location.

== Major intersections ==
The entire route is in Huntingdon County.

Location	mi	km	Destinations	Notes
Lincoln Township	0.000	0.000	PA 26 (Raystown Road) – Everett, Huntingdon	Western terminus
Clay Township	19.126	30.780	PA 655 north (Waterfall Road) – Saltillo	West end of PA 655 overlap
Clay Township	19.226	30.941	PA 655 south (Waterfall Road) – Hustontown	East end of PA 655 overlap
Three Springs	20.557	33.083	PA 747 north (Church Street) – Mount Union, Saltillo	Southern terminus of PA 747
Cromwell Township	26.122	42.039	PA 475 south (Maddensville Pike) – Hustontown	Northern terminus of PA 475
Orbisonia	27.497	44.252	US 522 (Ridgely Street) – Mount Union, McConnellsburg	Eastern terminus
1.000 mi = 1.609 km; 1.000 km = 0.621 mi: Concurrency terminus
