= Clay Township, Pennsylvania =

Clay Township is the name of some places in the U.S. state of Pennsylvania:

- Clay Township, Butler County, Pennsylvania
- Clay Township, Huntingdon County, Pennsylvania
- Clay Township, Lancaster County, Pennsylvania
