= Lincoln Township, Huntingdon County, Pennsylvania =

Township in Pennsylvania, US

Coordinates: 40°20′00″N 78°10′29″W

- Township
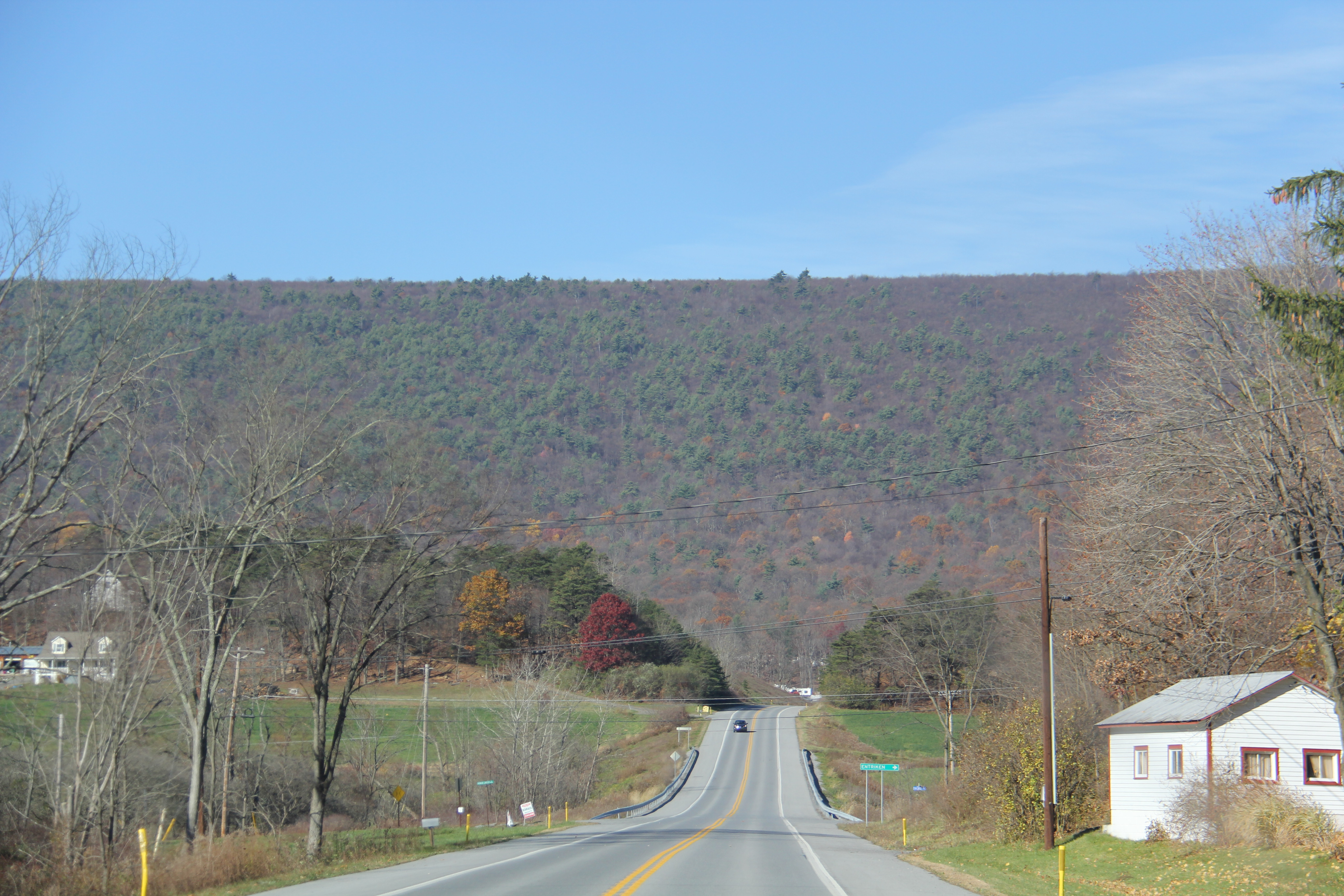
- PA 994 westbound near Entriken

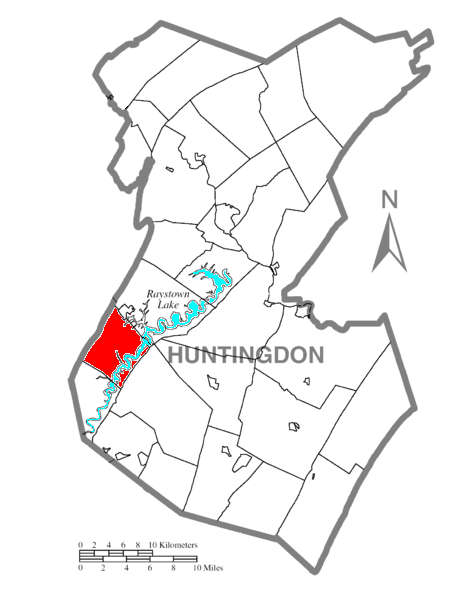
- Map of Huntingdon County, Pennsylvania Highlighting Lincoln Township

- Map of Huntingdon County, Pennsylvania
- Country: United States
- State: Pennsylvania
- County: Huntingdon

Area
  - Total: 20.95 sq mi (54.26 km^{2})
  - Land: 18.86 sq mi (48.85 km^{2})
  - Water: 2.09 sq mi (5.41 km^{2})

Population (2020)
  - Total: 319 ▼
  - Estimate (2022): 313
  - Density: 17.8/sq mi (6.88/km^{2})
- Time zone: UTC-5 (Eastern (EST))
  - Summer (DST): UTC-4 (EDT)
- Zip code: 16657
- Area code: 814
- FIPS code: 42-061-43424
- Local phone exchanges: 658

Lincoln Township is a township that is located in Huntingdon County, Pennsylvania, United States. The population was 321 at the time of the 2020 census.

The village of Entriken, which is located at the intersection of routes 26 and 994, is the only village in the township.

== Geography ==
According to the United States Census Bureau, the township has a total area of 21.1 square miles (54.7 km^{2}), of which 18.9 square miles (49.1 km^{2}) is land and 2.2 square miles (5.6 km^{2}) (10.28%) is water.

== Recreation ==
A portion of the Pennsylvania State Game Lands Number 73 is located along the township's western border and a portion of Raystown Lake is located near its eastern end.

== Demographics ==
Historical population
Census	Pop.	Note	%±
2000	319		—
2010	338		6.0%
2020	319		−5.6%
2022 (est.)	313		−1.9%
U.S. Decennial Census

As of the census of 2000, there were 319 people, 142 households, and 101 families residing in the township.

The population density was 16.8 people per square mile (6.5/km^{2}). There were 265 housing units at an average density of 14.0/sq mi (5.4/km^{2}).

The racial makeup of the township was 99.69% White and 0.31% African American.

There were 142 households, out of which 23.2% had children under the age of eighteen living with them; 64.1% were married couples living together, 4.9% had a female householder with no husband present, and 28.2% were non-families. 26.1% of all households were made up of individuals, and 13.4% had someone living alone who was sixty-five years of age or older.

The average household size was 2.25 and the average family size was 2.67.

Within the township, the population was spread out, with 19.1% of residents who were under the age of eighteen, 3.4% who were aged eighteen to twenty-four, 26.6% who were aged twenty-five to forty-four, 28.8% who were aged forty-five to sixty-four, and 21.9% who were sixty-five years of age or older. The median age was forty-five years.

For every one hundred females, there were 104.5 males. For every one hundred females who were aged eighteen or older, there were 104.8 males.

The median income for a household in the township was $28,625, and the median income for a family was $37,500. Males had a median income of $27,500 compared with that of $22,750 for females.

The per capita income for the township was $15,457.

Approximately 7.3% of families and 9.4% of the population were living below the poverty line, including 14.0% of those who were aged sixty-five or older, but none under the age of eighteen.

== See also ==
- Entriken, the family name given to the local village
