= Pennsylvania Route 829 =

State highway in Huntingdon County, Pennsylvania, US

Pennsylvania Route 829

Route information
- Maintained by PennDOT
- Length: 17.04 mi (27.42 km)
- Existed: Spring 1964–present

Major junctions
- South end: PA 655 in Cass Township
- North end: US 22 in Mill Creek

Location
- Country: United States
- State: Pennsylvania
- Counties: Huntingdon

Highway system
- Pennsylvania State Route System; Interstate; US; State; Scenic; Legislative
← PA 828	→ PA 830
← I-376	PA 376	→ PA 377

Pennsylvania Route 829 (PA 829) is a 17.04-mile-long (27.42 km) state highway located in Huntingdon County, Pennsylvania. The southern terminus is at PA 655 in Cass Township. The northern terminus is at U.S. Route 22 (US 22) in Mill Creek.

== Route description ==
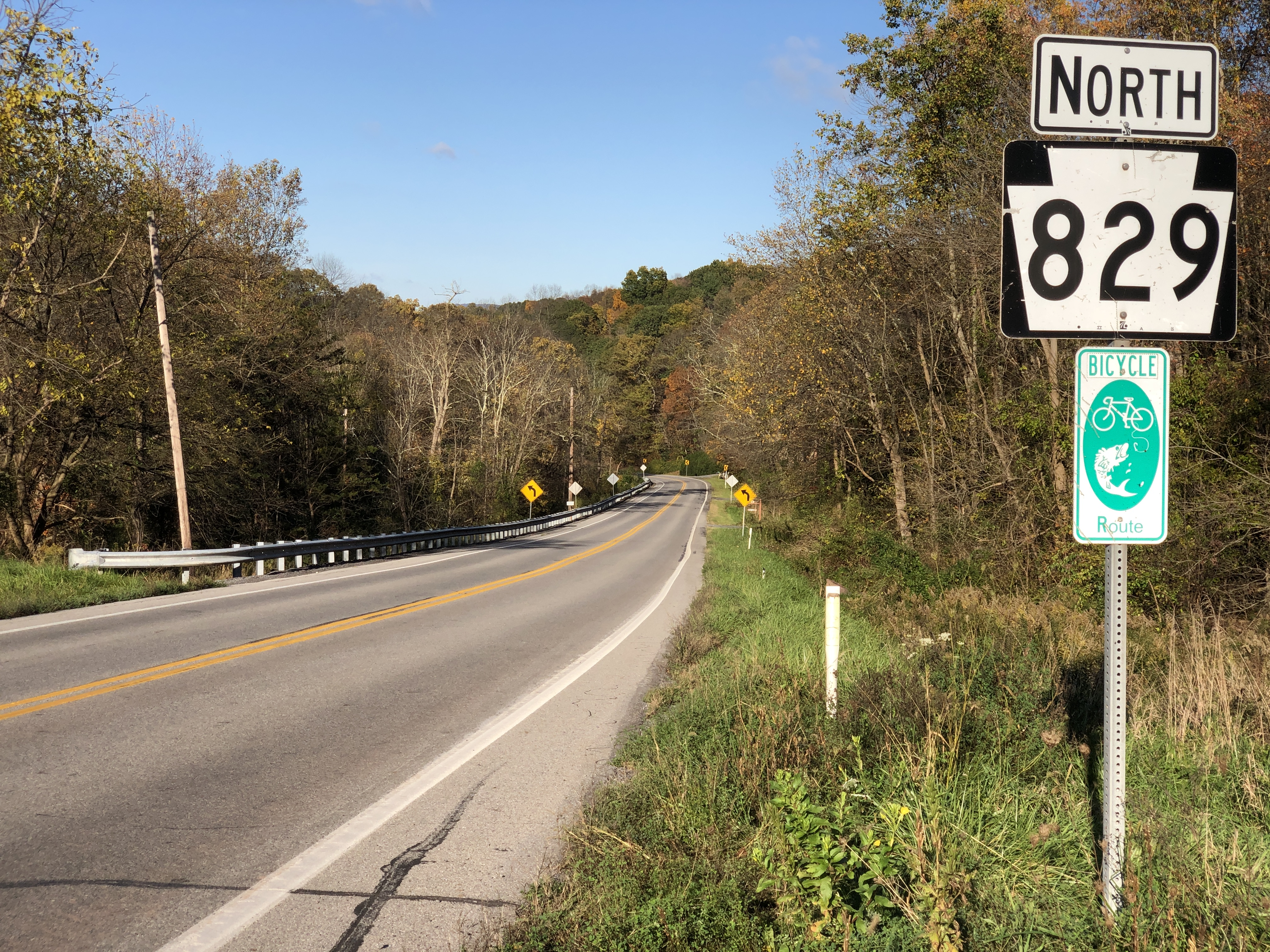
PA 829 northbound in Union Township

PA 829 begins at an intersection with PA 655 in the community of Knightsville in Cass Township, heading west on a two-lane undivided road. The route runs through forested areas with some fields across a gap in Clear Ridge, curving to the north into a narrow agricultural valley. The road passes through an area of woods before coming into more farmland with some homes. At this point, PA 829 turns west and begins to ascend forested Sideling Hill, curving southwest and then northwest as it crosses the hill. After descending Sideling Hill, the route enters the Trough Creek Valley and heads north into the borough of Cassville and becomes Walnut Street, passing homes. Farther north, the road becomes Water Street and heads back into Cass Township, passing through agricultural areas with some residences and becoming an unnamed road. PA 829 curves to then north-northeast and runs through more areas of farms and woods with occasional homes. The route enters Union Township and passes through Calvin. The road continues northeast through more rural areas of the valley, passing through Colfax. Past here, PA 829 becomes Trough Creek Valley Road and heads into forests, crossing Sideling Hill again. After crossing the hill, the route continues through forests and crosses the Juniata River. At this point, PA 829 heads into Henderson Township and runs through rural areas of homes, crossing Norfolk Southern's Pittsburgh Line before ending at US 22.

== History ==
PA 829 was first designated in 1926 to 1946, running from PA 35 at the community of Richdale in Huntingdon County to PA 75 at the community of Waterloo in Juniata County. The road is now known as Quadrant Route 3037.

PA 829's second designation was in spring 1964 to run from PA 747 and PA 994 in Three Springs north to US 22 near Mill Creek, replacing PA 376 between Three Springs and Saltillo and PA 76 between Saltillo and Mill Creek. This change was made to remove numbering conflicts that resulted from the designation of I-76 and I-376 in Pennsylvania.

== Major intersections ==
The entire route is in Huntingdon County.

Location	mi	km	Destinations	Notes
Cass Township	0.00	0.00	PA 655 (Hares Valley Road) – Mapleton, Saltillo	Southern terminus
Mill Creek	17.04	27.42	US 22 (William Penn Highway) – Mount Union, Huntingdon	Northern terminus
1.000 mi = 1.609 km; 1.000 km = 0.621 mi
