= Waterfall, Pennsylvania =

Unincorporated community in Pennsylvania, US

- Unincorporated community.
- Location within Pennsylvania Location within the United States
- Coordinates: 40°07′39″N 78°03′46″W
- Country: United States
- State: Pennsylvania
- County: Fulton
- Elevation: 850 ft (260 m)
- Time zone: UTC-5 (Eastern (EST))
  - Summer (DST): UTC-4 (EDT)
- ZIP code: 16689
- Area code: 814
- GNIS feature ID: 1190671

Waterfall is an unincorporated community in Fulton County, Pennsylvania, United States. The community is located at the intersection of state routes 655 and 913, 6.5 miles (10.5 km) south-southwest of Saltillo. Waterfall has a post office, with ZIP code 16689.
