= Harrisonville, Pennsylvania =

Unincorporated community in Pennsylvania, U.S.

Coordinates: 39°59′15″N 78°03′34″W

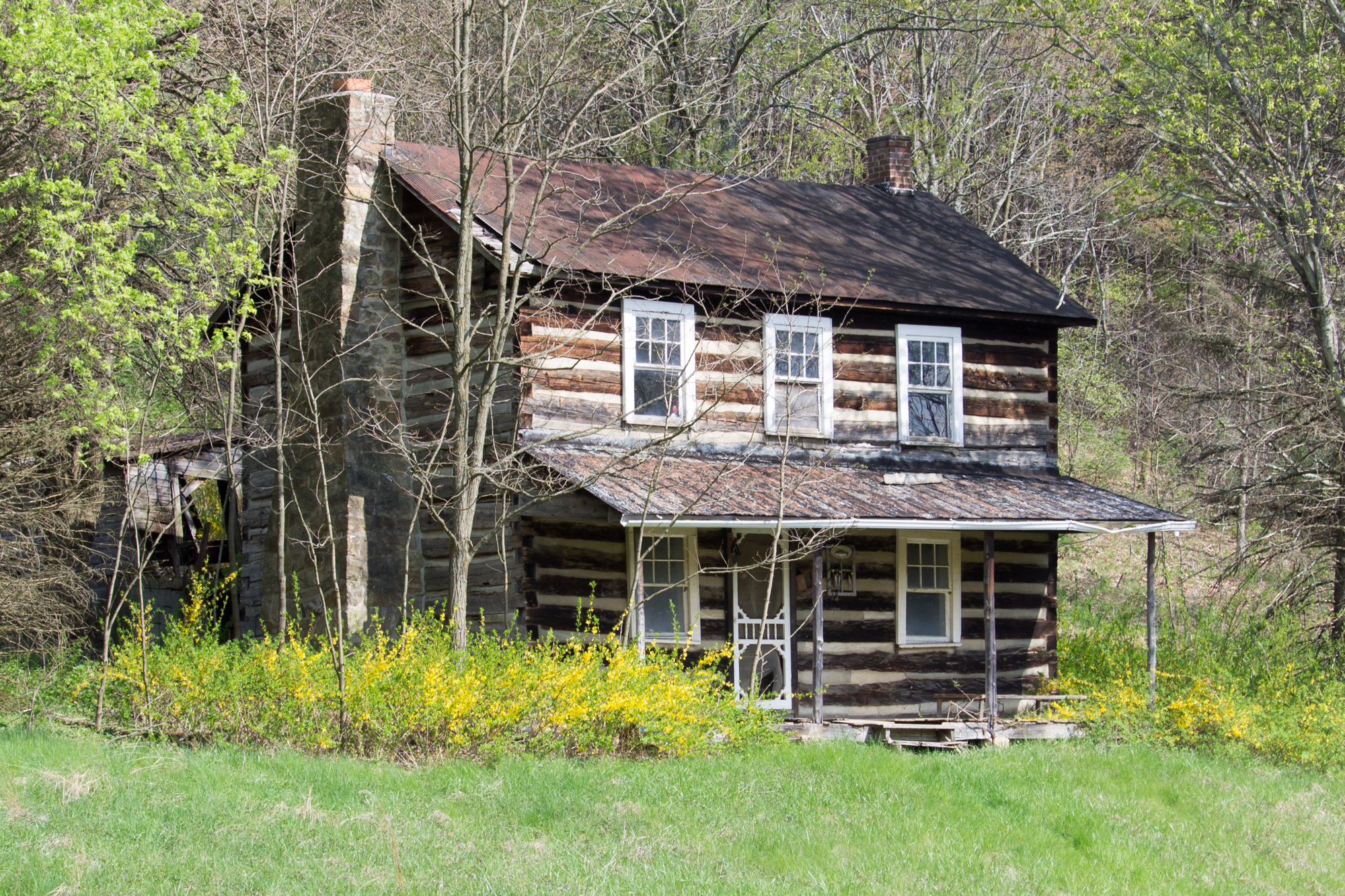
Log cabin near Harrisonville

Harrisonville is an unincorporated community located at the intersection of U.S. Route 30 and Pennsylvania Route 655 in Licking Creek Township, Fulton County, Pennsylvania, United States. It was named after the ninth U.S. President, William Henry Harrison. Located as a stopping point along the Lincoln Highway, a small country store still serves travelers today. In the 1850s it had two stores, a schoolhouse, one hotel, a blacksmith shop, and seven residents.
