= Three Springs Creek =

Stream in Pennsylvania, U.S.

Coordinates: 40.2136°N 77.9258°W

Three Springs Creek is a stream in the U.S. state of Pennsylvania. It is a 4.3-mile-long (6.9 km) tributary of Aughwick Creek, which then flows into the Juniata River.

Spring Creek and North Spring Branch flow through the borough of Three Springs, joining just southeast of the borough limits to form Three Springs Creek.

Three Springs Creek was named for the fact its headwaters are fed by three springs.

== See also ==
- List of rivers of Pennsylvania
