= Hudson Grist Mill =

- U.S. National Register of Historic Places
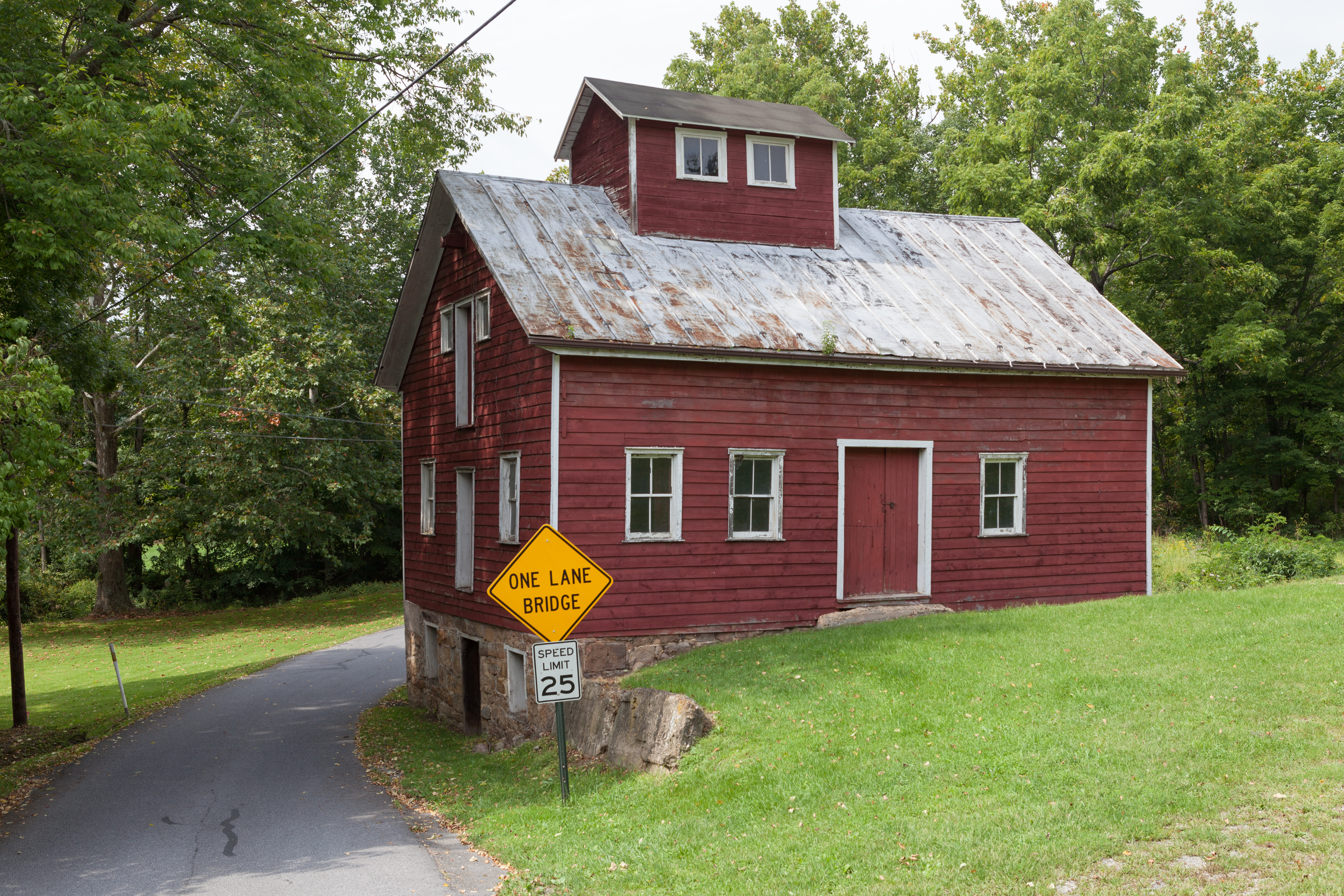
- East and south sides in September 2014

- Location within Pennsylvania Location within the United States
- Location: PA 829, Saltillo, Pennsylvania
- Coordinates: 40°12′49″N 78°0′27″W
- Area: 1 acre (0.40 ha)
- Built: 1850
- MPS: Industrial Resources of Huntingdon County, 1780--1939 MPS
- NRHP reference No.: 90000390
- Added to NRHP: March 20, 1990

The Hudson Grist Mill, also known as the Crotsley Mill, is an historic grist mill which is located in Saltillo in Huntingdon County, Pennsylvania.

It was listed on the National Register of Historic Places in 1990.

== History and architectural features ==
Built in 1850, this historic grist mill is a two-and-one-half-story frame building, measuring 36 by 28 feet (11.0 by 8.5 m). It sits on a rubble stone foundation and has clapboard siding. An elevator head is housed in centrally placed extra story. A two-story frame addition is attached to the mill.
