= Calvin, Pennsylvania =

Unincorporated community in Pennsylvania, US

- Unincorporated community
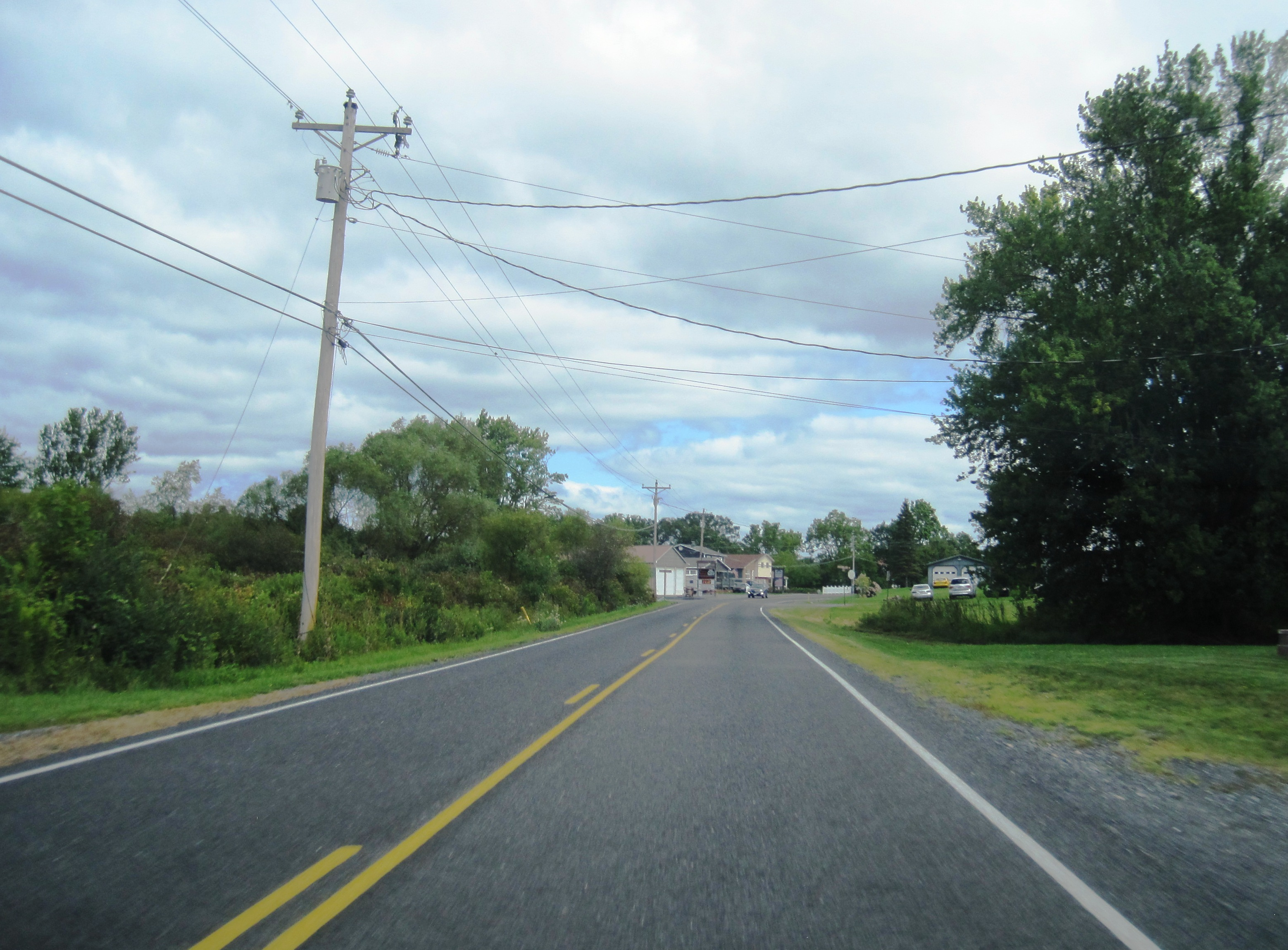
- PA 829 northbound in Calvin

- Location within Pennsylvania
- Coordinates: 40°20′12″N 78°01′38″W
- Country: United States
- State: Pennsylvania
- County: Huntingdon
- Township: Union
- Elevation: 1,165 ft (355 m)
- Time zone: UTC-5 (Eastern (EST))
  - Summer (DST): UTC-4 (EDT)
- ZIP code: 16622
- Area code: 814
- GNIS feature ID: 1170952

Calvin is an unincorporated community in Huntingdon County, Pennsylvania, United States. The community is located along Pennsylvania Route 829, 3 miles (4.8 km) north of Cassville. Calvin has a post office, with ZIP code 16622.
