= Raystown Lake =

Man-made lake in Pennsylvania, US

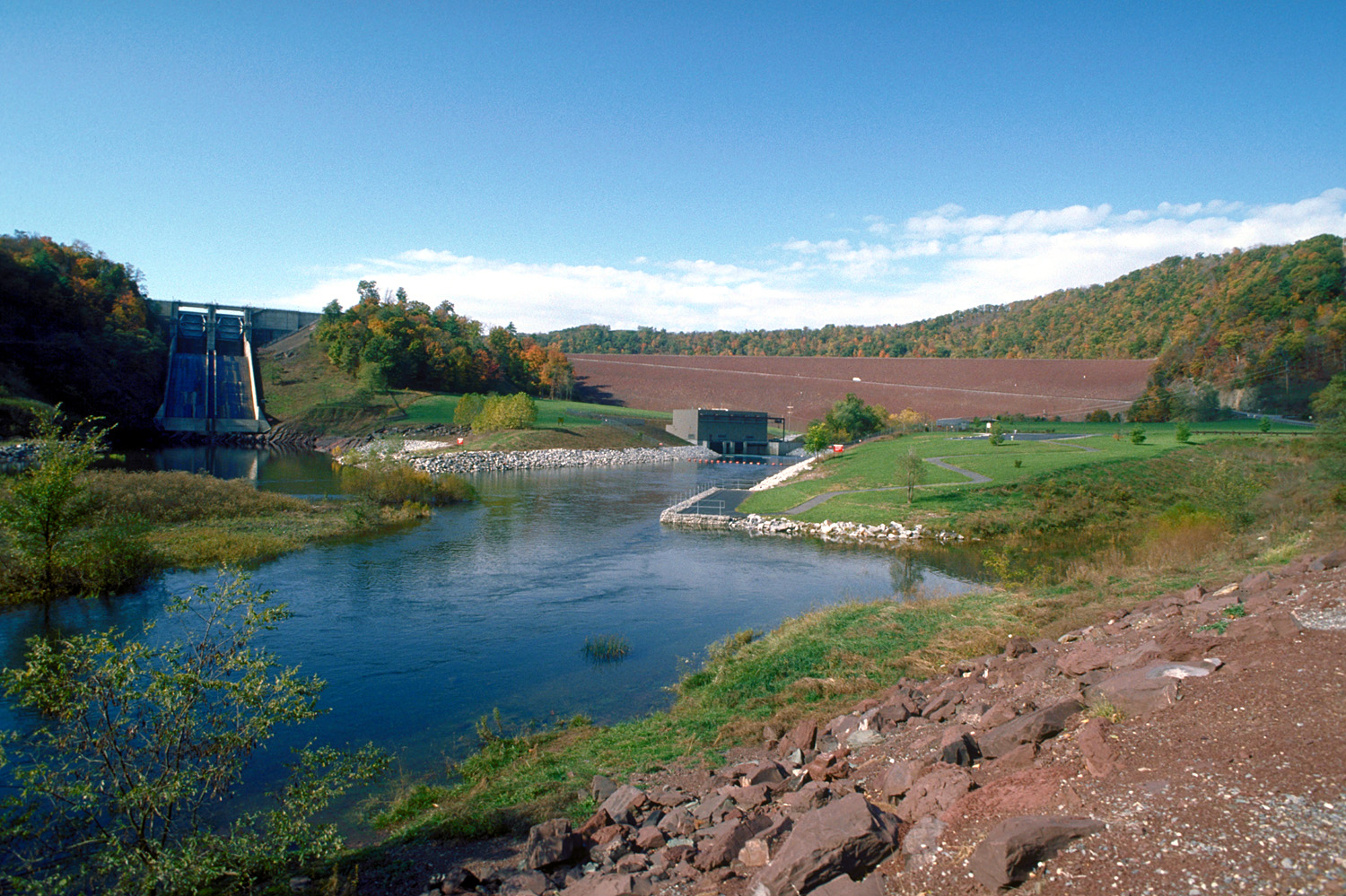
- Raystown Lake Dam

- Location within Pennsylvania Location within the United States
- Location: Huntingdon County, Pennsylvania
- Coordinates: 40°26′01″N 78°00′24″W
- Primary inflows: Raystown Branch Juniata River
- Basin countries: United States
- Max. length: 32 mi (51 km)
- Surface area: 8,300 acres (33.6 km^{2})
- Max. depth: 200 ft (61.0 m)
- Surface elevation: 790 ft (240 m)

Raystown Lake is a reservoir in Huntingdon County, Pennsylvania. It is the largest lake that is entirely within Pennsylvania. The original lake was built by the Simpson family of Huntingdon as a hydroelectric project. The current 8,300-acre (34 km^{2}) Raystown Lake was completed in 1973 by the Army Corps of Engineers. Raystown is around 200 feet (61 m) deep in the deepest area near the dam. The lake was created primarily to control floods, provide electricity, and support recreational activities. Allegheny Electric Cooperative operates the Raystown Hydroelectric Project and William F. Matson Generating Station at the Raystown Dam, a 21 MW, two-unit hydroelectric project.

Raystown Lake has many recreational activities. Some of the most popular activities are boating, swimming, mountain biking, scuba diving, fishing, and camping. Raystown Lake offers several boat launches as well as two larger marinas that have restaurants and often hold special events. There is also an abundance of campsites surrounding the lake. The lake also offers disc golf, a waterpark, fishing guides, and hiking trails. Firework displays are held at the Raystown Lake Resort on Memorial Day Weekend, July 3, and the Sunday night before Labor Day. The fireworks at the resort are watched from the lake but can also be seen from the Pennsylvania Route 994 bridge; the resort is just south of this bridge.

Much of the land surrounding the lake is owned by the Army Corps of Engineers and is not available for residential development; because of this summer homes were built near the lake rather than on the waterfront, and most of the lake remains undeveloped. This makes the experience of boating on the lake very different from many other lakes; the hills on the shores of the winding lake are blanketed right down to the water by the trees. Raystown has a fishery including largemouth bass, striped bass, smallmouth bass, muskellunge, walleye, pickerel, perch, calico bass, lake trout, rainbow trout, brook trout, brown trout, bluegill, catfish, carp, white bass, rock bass, salmon and shad.

In 2015, a Texas-based energy company proposed building a large resort on the mountain above and marina with luxury amenities on the shore. Several Residents joined in protest and the Proposal did not meet the criteria required by the USACE for ecological and safety reasons.

== History ==
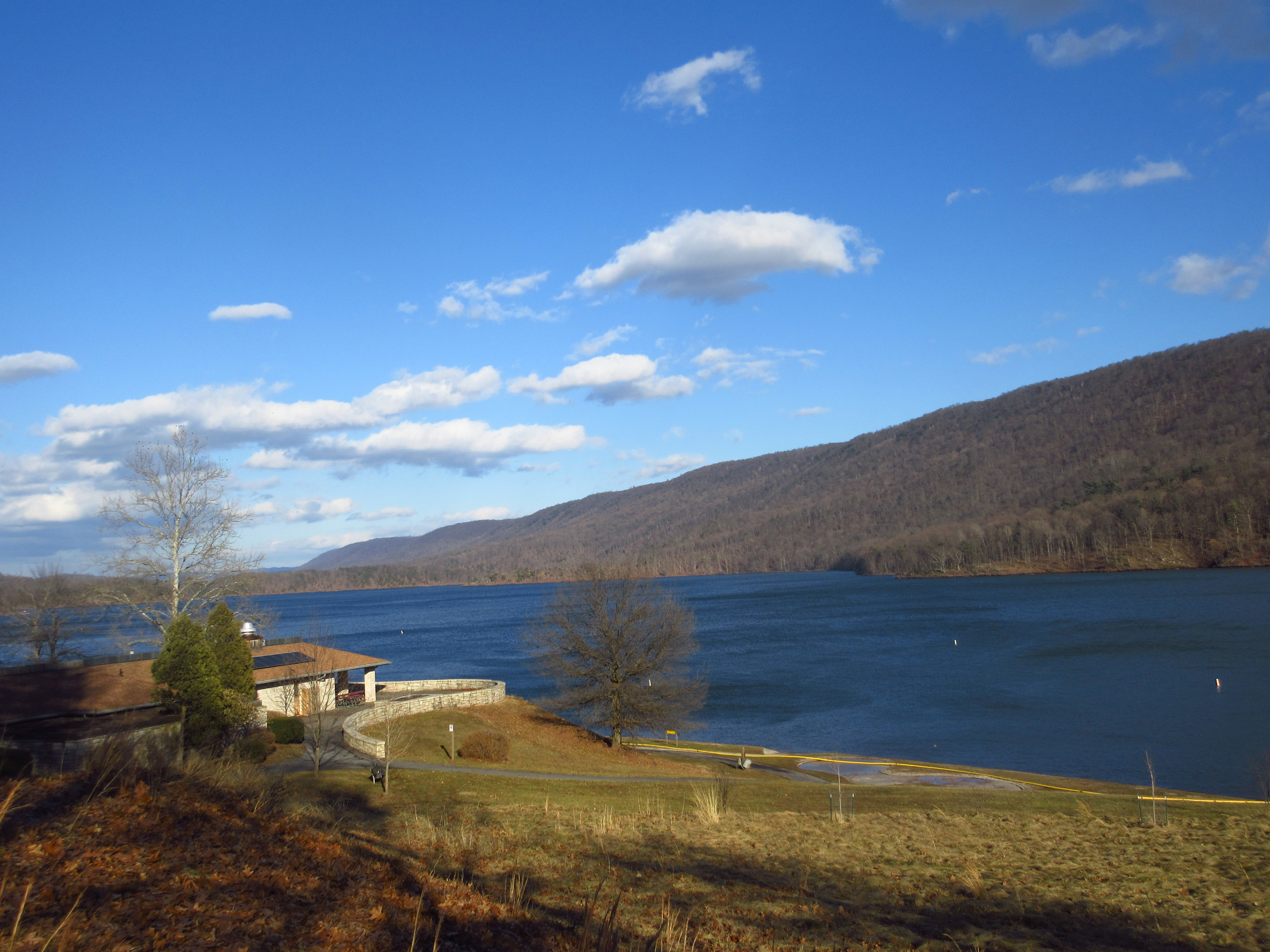
View from the western shore.

=== First Raystown Dam ===
The development of the first Raystown Dam in 1905 conceived the starting point for a history in consequential dams which eventually led to the creation of Raystown Lake in 1972. It has been said that the original dam was the creation of George Ernest and Warren Brown Simpson. The formation of the idea had been recorded by the New Era Journal, October 12, 1905 in which it stated: "earlier in the year 1905 George Ernest Simpson and Warren Brown Simpson were fishing along the Branch. It was good water for bass at that time and their catch was very gratifying. Uncle Ernest, sometime during the day, said: 'W. B., this would make a fine location for a hydroelectric development.'" That idea took immediate fruit for they were both "promoters." No one knows how much time and thought was put into the project idea, but eventually permanent charters for the development of the stream were granted by the Commonwealth and signed by Governor Pennypacker on March 30, 1906 (Drake, 1905).

The 1905 Raystown Dam brought many changes for the Huntingdon area, physically and economically. The Raystown Dam was the first hydroelectric dam to be built on the Raystown Branch of the Juniata River and the construction process had fewer financial problems because it was a product of private instead of public enterprise. The December 9, 1989 edition of the Daily News stated, "The first power dam on the Raystown Branch was the product of private enterprise. It was conceived in 1906 when ten area men formed the Raystown Water Power Company. The corporation financed the construction of the dam, which took from 1907 to 1912 to build" (Shuck, 1989) The dam also brought a new diversity to the area in which Italian immigrants set up a small village and built the dam by hand and horsepower.

This dam also started to open the area for vast cottage development, but with this came problems. "Almost a thousand cottages are near its shores, and the construction last year by the County Commissioners of Fink's Bridge opened up another large area for development. But right now all this area is in turmoil just because some people have started talking about a new high level dam for this area; completely cover all existing cottages and permanent homes. This has resulted in a condition of such unrest that the real estate value of the present area has been very seriously harmed" (Drake, 1905).

Before the current Raystown Dam was constructed in 1972, the original dam underwent two purchases and one merger before it became the property of Pennsylvania Electric Company (Penelec) in 1946 (Shuck, 1989). This dam is now a popular diving site by local scuba divers.

=== Second Raystown Dam ===
The proposal for the new dam incorporated the ideas of bringing tourism into the area, promoting recreation, and flood control. The actual purpose stated, "The project will provide flood control, recreation, water quality and fish and wildlife enhancement" (U.S. Army Corps of Engineers, 1974). Although tourism and recreation was what was projected as the most important to the public and community, the reason the dam was approved was for flood control. The project was authorized under the general provisions of the Flood Control Act of 1962 (Public Law 87-874, 87th Congress, second session). The dam has a flood storage capacity of 247,900 acre-feet (305,800,000 m^{3}), equivalent to about 5 inches (13 cm) of runoff from the drainage area of 960 square miles (2,500 km^{2}) above the dam, between elevations of 786 and 812 feet (240 and 247 m) (U.S. Army Corps of Engineers, 1965). "The project would reduce flood stages along the Juniata River at Mount Union, Lewistown, Mifflin, and Newport, Pennsylvania, and to a lesser extent, along the main stem of the Susquehanna River below the mouth of the Juniata River" (U.S. Army Corps of Engineers, 1965).

It is estimated that Raystown Lake was effective in preventing damages in the Juniata Basin downstream from the dam of $48,100,000 and of $11,900,000 along the lower Susquehanna River (U.S. Army Corps of Engineers, 1974). Another important aspect was the plan for its recreational activities. These recreational activities primarily were planned around summer water-based and outdoor sports by Karl Kaufffman, chief of outdoor planning and Michael Kolessar, project planning chief, both of Baltimore District, U.S. Army Corps of Engineers (USACE) (Anon., 1973). Their plan included impounding 8,300 acres (3,400 ha) to create a 30-mile-long (48 km) lake, creating 110 miles (180 km) of shoreline. In the early stages of the recreation creation it was projected that there would be 1.4 million annual visitors with a $2 million annual intake (U.S. Army Corps of Engineers, 1974). There were also the plans to build Seven Points Marina recreation area and Rothrock camping area.

Seven Points Marina was planned to provide long-term boat storage and marina services according to minimum specifications set by USA-CE. Kauffman and Kolessar stated that Seven Points recreation area was designed for public use and convenience, with camping areas, boat launching sites and bathing facilities-to provide the "whole gamut of outdoor recreation" (Anon., 1973). Also it was to be advertised national and supervised by the USACE Raystown Force (Anon., 1973).

Rothrock camping area would provide a camping space with a boat launching ramp, beach and shower facilities. But what is interesting is that Kauffman noted that the "camping spaces at the new reservoir will be 50 feet (15 m), center to center, and his (Kauffman's) management plans include withholding 20 percent of the total available camping area from use each year, on a rotating basis, to allow the vegetation time to recoup" (Anon., 1973).

Using the new dam for hydroelectric power should not have been a surprise considering that that was the primary purpose of the original dam. What was surprising was that the hydroelectric power was under much controversy and not completed until August 31, 1988, when the William F. Matson Generating Station was dedicated.

Much of the controversy had to do with the design of the station, because it was now publicly instead of privately owned, which opened the decisions of the design to a vast array of individuals instead of a limited few. "In August of 1979, the Board of Engineers for Rivers and Harbors, an independent review agency within the U.S. Army Corps of Engineers, put the issue of pumped storage hydro-electric generation to rest by announcing that it couldn't recommend federal participation in such a project due to a lack of local support" (Shuck, 1989). In 1980, Allegheny Electric Cooperative and the Pennsylvania Electric Company (Penelec) jointly filed application with the Federal Energy Regulatory Commission to build a run-of-the-river hydro power station just below the breast of the dam (Shuck, 1989). In this plan the turbines would only be spun by water exiting over the dam's spillways, eliminating the threat of significant water fluctuations (Shuck, 1989). But because of the Three Mile Island disaster, Penelec left Allegheny Energy to be responsible for the project in 1986. This $41 million facility had the capacity of generating 21 megawatts and service 8,500 homes with energy.

The construction of the dam was a project of the Baltimore Corps of Engineers with Colonel Love in charge, Karl Kauffman chief of outdoor planning, and Michael Kolessar as project planning chief, and the Green Construction Company. Construction started in 1968 on the dam and operation began in 1973 (Anon., 1987).

The construction of the dam did leave an impact on the area which included covering many of Huntingdon County landmarks, such as the old Raystown Dam, Fink's bridge, Murrell Worthing property near Entriken, Entriken Barn, Earl Fisher property near Entriken, Hawn's Bridge, six cottages by New Hawn's Bridge, Entriken Mansion, Charles Hoover Feed Mill near Aitch, Entriken Bridge, Juniata Township Community Center near Hawn's Bridge, and Schell Bridge (Anon., 1966).

Although it might appear that the dam was well accepted in the area there were some controversial issues. One of the main controversies dealt with funding the project. During this time period the Vietnam War was occurring and so leisure spending was not received well by most individuals who had ties with Vietnam. Also, there was the concern that this was a purely recreational unnecessary project and not for flood control. At the time the Chairman of the Senate Public Works Committee, Senator Allen J. Ellender, did not approve of funding this unnecessary project. In the "Help Save the Raystown Dam" petition it states, "Senator Allen J. Ellender... has expressed his dissatisfaction with the new dam because he feels the Army Engineers should be taking care of flood control, navigation and hurricane projects, and not building recreational areas. The Army Engineers have told the committee that 62 percent of the reason for building the dam is for recreation." This petition listed five areas of concern:

1. The federal government should not be spending money to build recreational projects at this time;
2. The Army Engineers should spend their time in projects that are more concerned with flood control, navigation and hurricane projection;
3. All available money should be spent in supporting Armed Forces in Vietnam;
4. All unnecessary spending should be cut to help keep the dollar sound;
5. The average taxpayer in Central Pennsylvania does not support this new dam (Anon. 1968)

This petition was to take action for the May 8, 1968 hearing. The dam was approved for a total expenditure of 67.8 million dollars.

Another issue was the amount of land needed. The lands authorized to be acquired consisted of 15,000 acres (6,100 ha) for the dam and reservoir area, 13,000 acres (5,300 ha) for the public access and recreation area, and 2,000 acres (810 ha) for the wildlife mitigation area for a total acreage of 30,000 acres (12,000 ha) at $20,000,000.00 (U.S. Army Corps of Engineers, 1974). In the end 1,800 property owners sold their deeds or easements to the federal government and 407 graves were relocated (Shuck, 1990).

The construction of the new Raystown Dam and Raystown Lake was completed in 1972. The lake was conveniently nearly filled by Tropical Storm Agnes. The Lake Raystown Program of Dedication relates the significance of the Tropical Storm Agnes and the Lake Raystown Dam by noting, "The partially completed Raystown Lake Project was effective in storing 160,000 acre-feet (200,000,000 m^{3}) of flood water (ultimate flood control storage is 248,000 acre-feet (306,000,000 m^{3})) during the June 1972 Storm Agnes which resulted in reducing peak flows in the Juniata River at Lewistown and Newport, Pennsylvania by 7.5 feet (2.3 m) and 4.5 feet (1.4 m), respectively. Had the project not been available for flood storage, stages at both of these stations would have exceeded the record 1936 flood. It is estimated that Lake Raystown Dam was effective in preventing Agnes damages in the Juniata Basin downstream from the dam of $48,100,000 and of $11,900,000 along the lower Susquehanna River" (U.S. Army Corps of Engineers, 1974). The formal ceremony of dedication for Lake Raystown was June 6, 1974 and the area attracts about 1.5 million visitors annually.

The history of the Raystown Dam is not limited to the history of the dam and lake itself but also includes the human history of the watershed and the environmental laws relevant to the area. The original 34-foot-high (10 m) hydroelectric dam underwent construction in 1907 resulting in the Raystown Water and Power Co. (later Penelec) generating their first electricity in 1912. The spillway elevation was around 650 feet (200 m) above sea level.

The expansion brought the water level up to a normal operating level of 786 feet (240 m) above sea level with an overflow at 812 feet (247 m), and included a 20 megawatt conventional hydropower generator.

Part of the town of Aitch is now under the level of the lake. The communities and villages of Brumbaugh's Crossing, Hawn's Bridge, Sarah and Snydertown all lie underwater.

While it is rumored that there are entire towns (and dead bodies of townspeople who refused to leave) still intact under the water, only a few more permanent structures were left in place. Some roads, a bridge over the old river, the original power station and the original dam still remain.

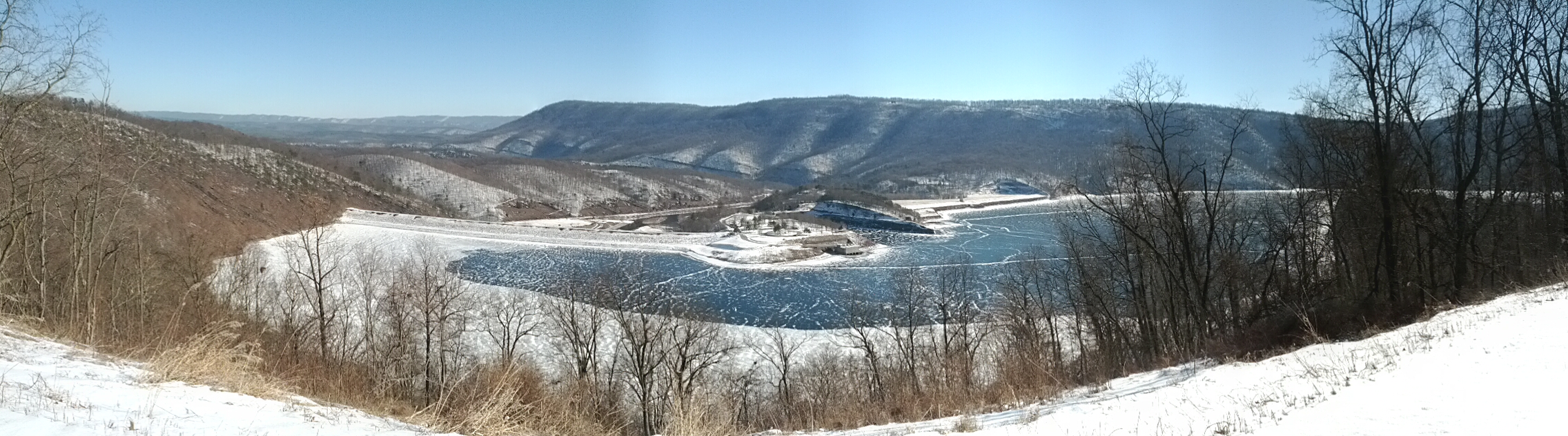
Raystown Lake from Ridenour Overlook, 2014

=== Archaeological area ===
Sheep Rock Shelter is an area of archaeological significance near the present-day Susquehannock Campground. Originally a wide ledge over the Juniata River, it provided shelter from the elements for its inhabitants. Its location and orientation preserved the remains buried below by protecting them from wind and moisture. When it was announced in the 1960s that the lake would be expanded, Juniata College and Pennsylvania State University excavated to uncover artifacts that would otherwise be flooded, ending their state of preservation. Their work recovered human remains from as long as 12,000 years ago. The Penn State University Library holds a 29-minute film about the site, titled "Discovery at Sheep Rock."

== Recreation ==
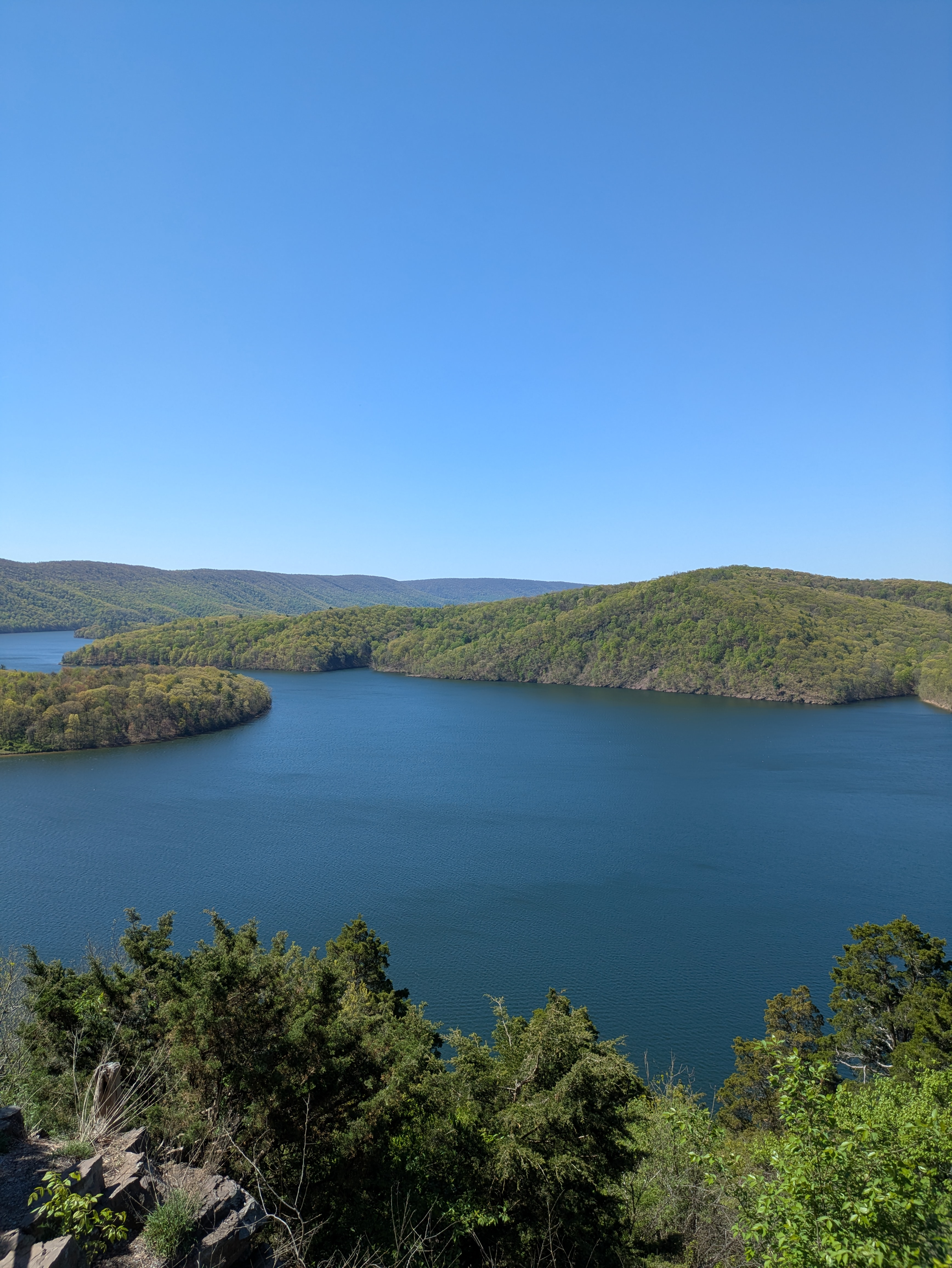
A view of Raystown Lake from Hawn's Overlook in Hesston, PA

Two of the most popular activities Raystown Lake offers are boating and camping. Raystown Lake has seven public boat launches; Seven points, Snyder's Run, Aitch, Tatman Run, Shy Beaver, James Creek, and Weaver Falls. There are also many campsites. Some of which are Sesquenhannock Campground, Pleasant Hills Campground, and Allegrippis Lodge. The lake is also known for its mountain biking, Seven points has a mountain bike skills park as well as many trails. Raystown Lake has two marinas. One is Seven Points which has a restaurant, a beach area, disc golf, boat rentals, and weekly summer events. The other is the Raystown Lake Resort. The resort offers boat rentals, cabins, camping, a waterpark, a restaurant, an ice cream shop, fireworks, and summer events.

There are also two marinas Seven Points and Raystown Lake Resort. At Seven Points Marina there are houseboat and pontoon rentals. They also offer permanent boat slips and rental boat slips as well as indoor boat storage. Along with boating activities, Seven Points has a restaurant, a beach area, and special events in the summer. Raystown Lake Resort also offers boat rentals, permanent boat slips, boat slip rentals, and summer events. The Resort also has a restaurant and an ice cream shop.

Raystown Lake also offers many campgrounds some of which are Sesquenhannock Campground and Pleasant Hills Campground. There is a variety of camping options including campers, tents, cabins, and some campgrounds only accessible by boat. Some other activities available at the lake are a mountain bike skills area, hiking and biking trails, bird watching, fishing, fishing guides, and picnic areas.
