= Hustontown, Pennsylvania =

Unincorporated community in Pennsylvania, U.S.

Coordinates: 40°02′53″N 78°01′37″W

Hustontown is a census-designated place in Fulton County Pennsylvania. It was named after Thomas Huston. Hustontown is situated in Dublin and Taylor Townships in northern Fulton County, Pennsylvania, United States at the intersection of Pennsylvania Routes 475 and 655. Despite the community's spelling, Huston is pronounced as Houston.

== Demographics ==
Historical population
Census	Pop.	Note	%±

The United States Census Bureau defined Hustontown as a census designated place (CDP) in 2023.
