= Three Springs, Pennsylvania =

Borough in Pennsylvania, US

- Borough
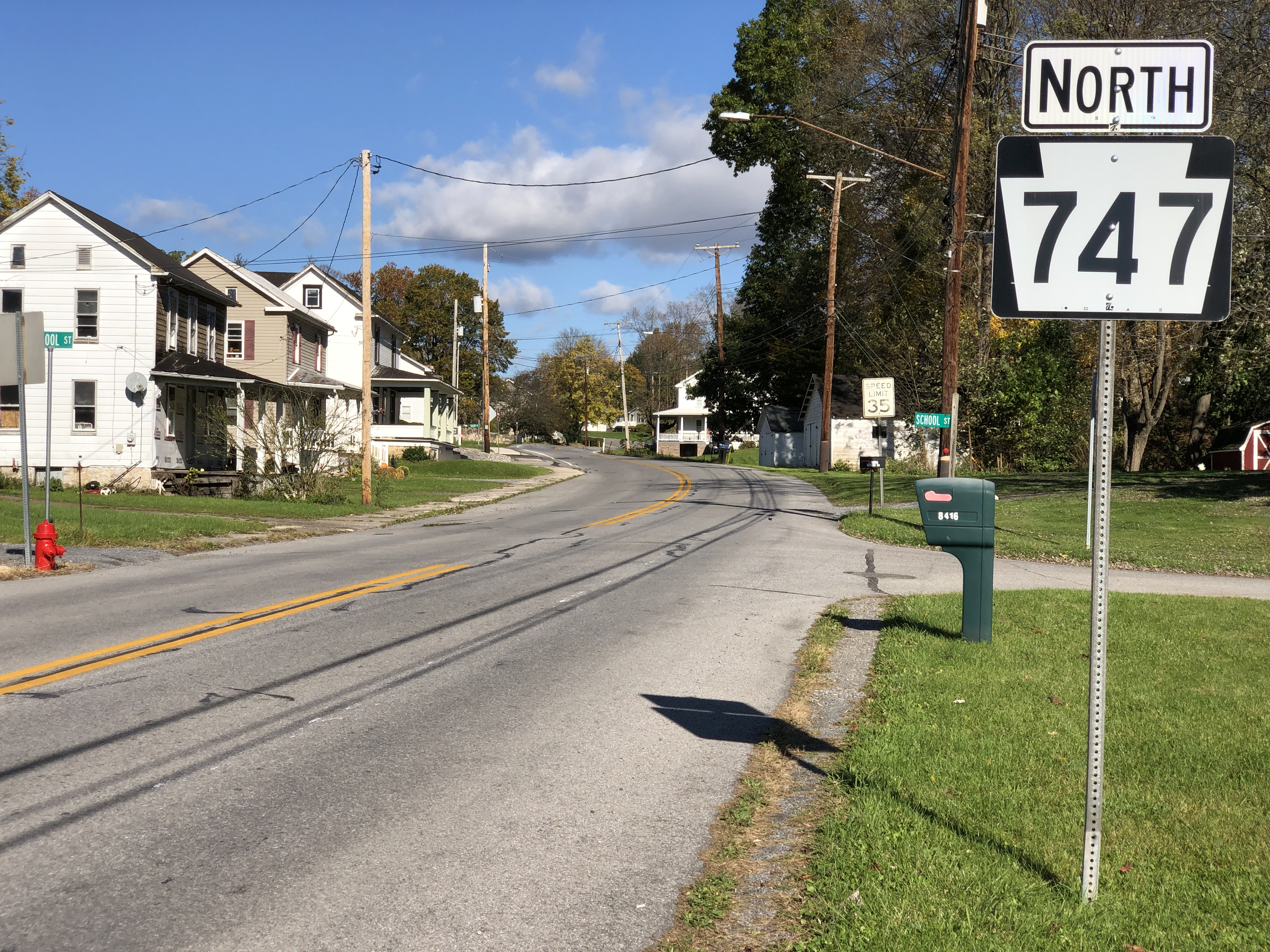
- Church Street (PA 747) in Three Springs

- Location of Three Springs in Huntingdon County, Pennsylvania.

- Location within Pennsylvania Location within the United States
- Coordinates: 40°11′48″N 77°58′57″W
- Country: United States
- State: Pennsylvania
- County: Huntingdon

Government
  - Type: Borough Council

Area
  - Total: 1.23 sq mi (3.19 km^{2})
  - Land: 1.23 sq mi (3.19 km^{2})
  - Water: 0 sq mi (0.00 km^{2})

Population (2010)
  - Total: 444
  - Estimate (2019): 433
  - Density: 351.2/sq mi (135.59/km^{2})
- Time zone: UTC-5 (Eastern (EST))
  - Summer (DST): UTC-4 (EDT)
- ZIP code: 17264
- Area code: 814
- FIPS code: 42-76632
- GNIS feature ID: 1215281
- Website: https://www.threespringsborough.org/
- Local phone exchanges: 447, 448

Three Springs is a borough in Huntingdon County, Pennsylvania, United States. As of the 2020 census, Three Springs had a population of 448.

The borough takes its name from nearby Three Springs Creek.

== History ==
The narrow-gauge East Broad Top Railroad was constructed through the community in 1874. A small yard and station were located here, and a tank farm and scrap yard were serviced. The tracks have been out of service since 1956 but are still in place and owned by the railroad.

== Geography ==
Three Springs is in southern Huntingdon County, sitting at the base of the south end of Jacks Mountain. Spring Creek and North Spring Branch flow through the borough, joining just southeast of the borough limits to form Three Springs Creek, an east-flowing tributary of Aughwick Creek and part of the Juniata River watershed. Sinking Run, another tributary of Three Springs Creek, flows through the eastern part of the borough.

Pennsylvania Route 994 runs through the center of the borough, leading northeast 6 miles (10 km) to Rockhill and west-northwest 20 miles (32 km) to Entriken. Pennsylvania Route 829 leads from the center of Three Springs 2 miles (3 km) northwest to Saltillo, and Pennsylvania Route 747 leads north-northeast 14 miles (23 km) to Mount Union at the Juniata River.

According to the United States Census Bureau, the borough of Three Springs has a total area of 1.2 square miles (3.2 km^{2}), all land.

== Demographics ==
Historical population
Census	Pop.	Note	%±
1870	189		—
1880	239		26.5%
1890	192		−19.7%
1900	196		2.1%
1910	248		26.5%
1920	345		39.1%
1930	398		15.4%
1940	427		7.3%
1950	417		−2.3%
1960	475		13.9%
1970	495		4.2%
1980	501		1.2%
1990	422		−15.8%
2000	445		5.5%
2010	444		−0.2%
2020	448		0.9%

As of the census of 2000, there were 445 people, 200 households, and 127 families residing in the borough. The population density was 357.7 inhabitants per square mile (138.1/km^{2}). There were 217 housing units at an average density of 174.4 per square mile (67.3/km^{2}). The racial makeup of the borough was 99.33% White, and 0.67% from two or more races. Hispanic or Latino of any race were 0.45% of the population.

There were 200 households, out of which 23.0% had children under the age of 18 living with them, 52.5% were married couples living together, 7.0% had a female householder with no husband present, and 36.5% were non-families. 31.5% of all households were made up of individuals, and 17.0% had someone living alone who was 65 years of age or older. The average household size was 2.23 and the average family size was 2.76.

In the borough the population was spread out, with 19.8% under the age of 18, 8.3% from 18 to 24, 24.7% from 25 to 44, 24.5% from 45 to 64, and 22.7% who were 65 years of age or older. The median age was 42 years. For every 100 females there were 101.4 males. For every 100 females age 18 and over, there were 93.0 males.

The median income for a household in the borough was $26,167, and the median income for a family was $35,179. Males had a median income of $32,250 versus $22,500 for females. The per capita income for the borough was $15,962. About 5.4% of families and 11.0% of the population were below the poverty line, including 5.9% of those under age 18 and 14.0% of those age 65 or over.

== Notable people ==
- Josh Edgin, pitcher, New York Mets
- Mike Fleck, Pennsylvania State Representative for the 81st District
- James Monroe Miller, U.S. Representative from Kansas
