= Licking Creek Township, Fulton County, Pennsylvania =

Township in Pennsylvania, United States

Coordinates: 39°59′17″N 78°08′59″W

Licking Creek Township
- Township
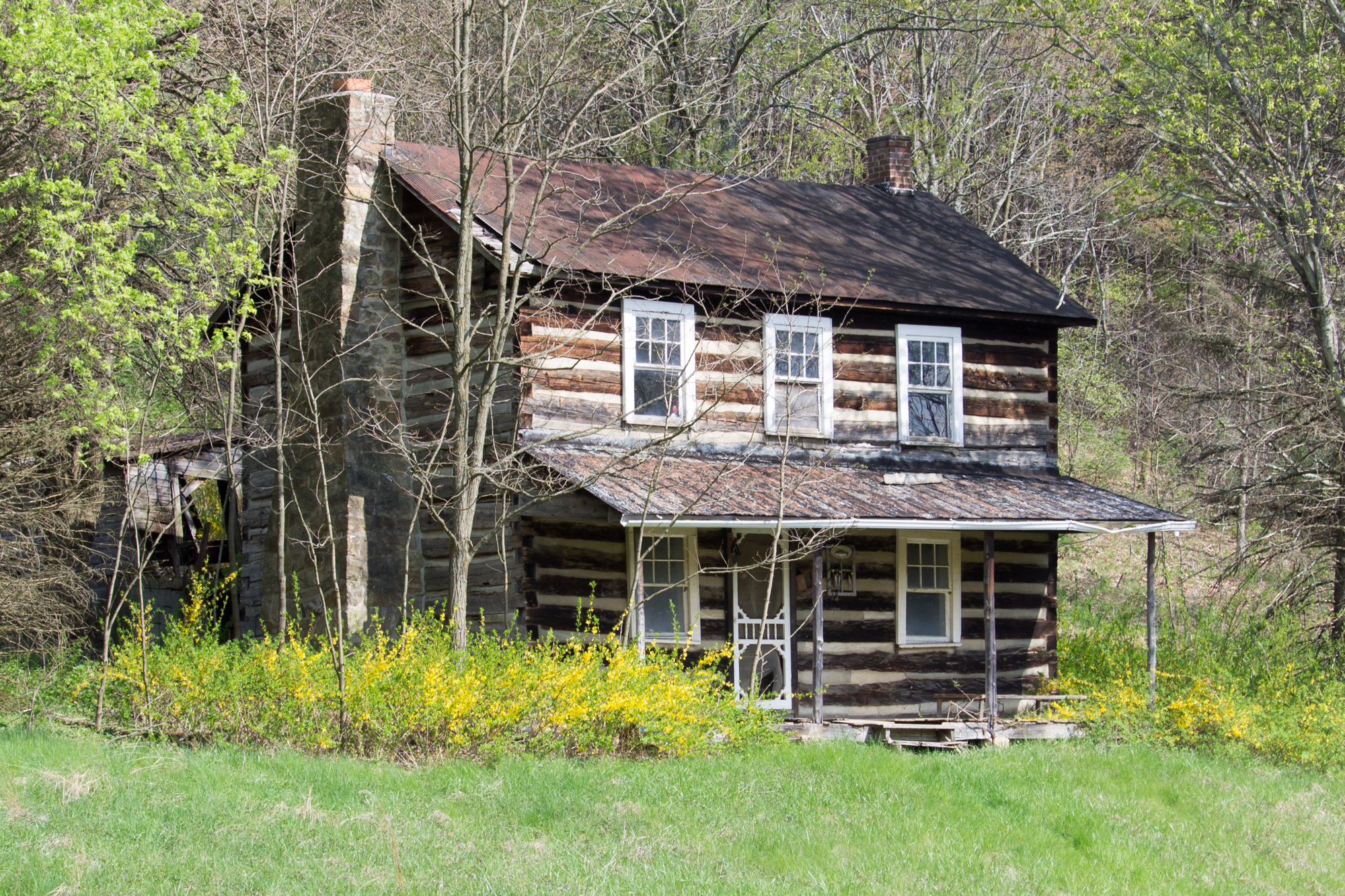
- Log cabin near Harrisonville

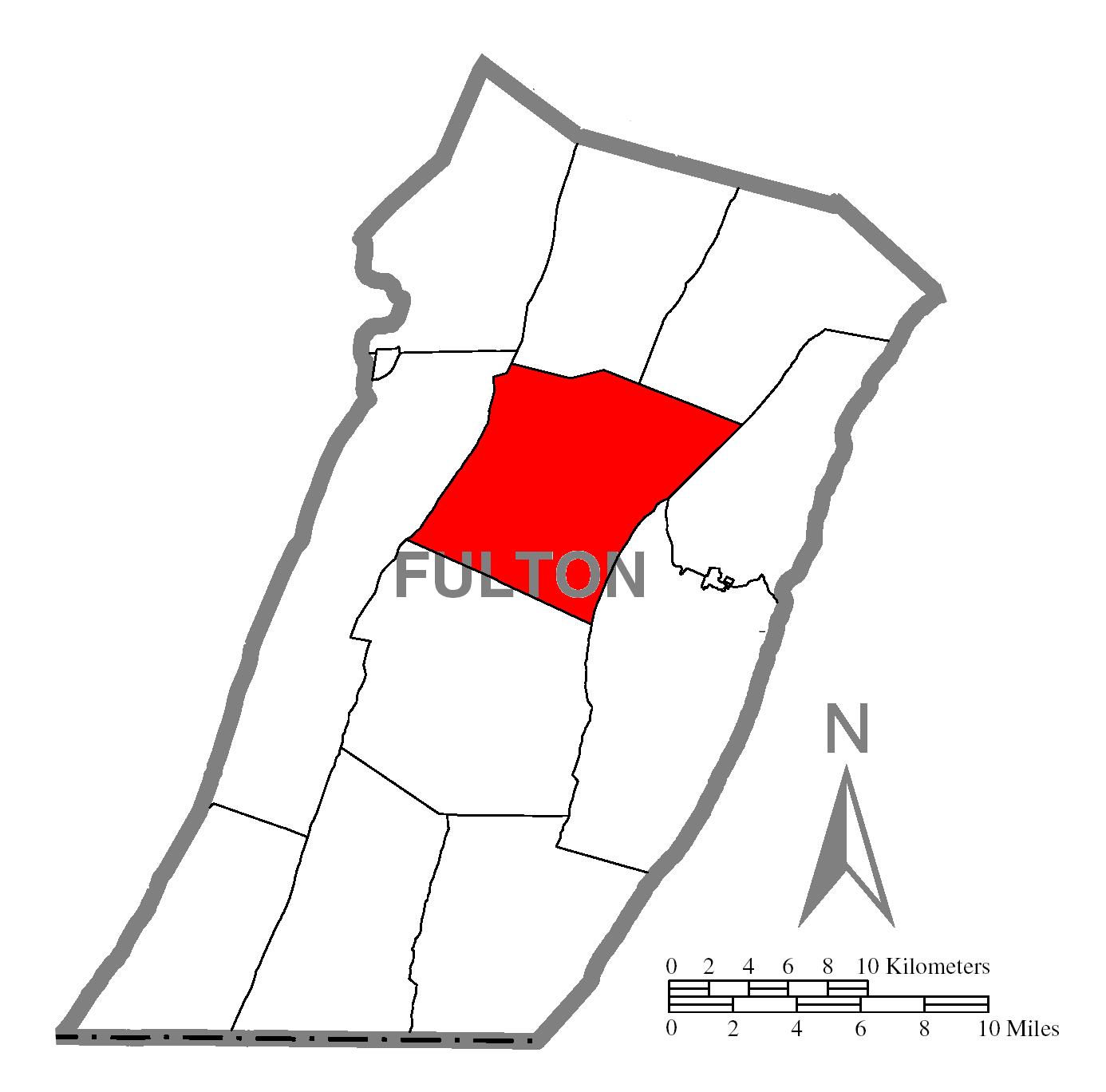
- Location of Licking Creek Township in Fulton County

- Location of Fulton County in Pennsylvania
- Country: United States
- State: Pennsylvania
- County: Fulton
- Established: 1775

Area
  - Total: 44.66 sq mi (115.68 km^{2})
  - Land: 44.66 sq mi (115.68 km^{2})
  - Water: 0 sq mi (0.00 km^{2})

Population (2020)
  - Total: 1,575 ▼
  - Estimate (2023): 1,581
  - Density: 37.6/sq mi (14.53/km^{2})
- Time zone: UTC-4 (EST)
  - Summer (DST): UTC-5 (EDT)
- FIPS code: 42-057-43200
- Website: https://lickingcreektownship.org/

Licking Creek Township is a township in Fulton County, Pennsylvania, United States. The population was 1,575 at the 2020 census.

== Geography ==
According to the United States Census Bureau, the township has a total area of 44.7 square miles (115.8 km^{2}), all land.

== Demographics ==
Historical population
Census	Pop.	Note	%±
2000	1,532		—
2010	1,703		11.2%
2020	1,576		−7.5%
2023 (est.)	1,581		0.3%
U.S. Decennial Census

As of the census of 2000, there were 1,532 people, 589 households, and 439 families residing in the township. The population density was 34.3 per square mile (13.2/km^{2}). There were 724 housing units at an average density of 16.2 per square mile (6.3/km^{2}). The racial makeup of the township was 98.83% White, 0.13% Native American, 0.20% Asian, 0.07% from other races, and 0.78% from two or more races. Hispanic or Latino of any race were 0.13% of the population.

There were 589 households, out of which 32.8% had children under the age of 18 living with them, 62.1% were married couples living together, 6.6% had a female householder with no husband present, and 25.3% were non-families. 21.7% of all households were made up of individuals, and 9.3% had someone living alone who was 65 years of age or older. The average household size was 2.60 and the average family size was 2.99.

In the township the population was spread out, with 25.4% under the age of 18, 7.6% from 18 to 24, 29.2% from 25 to 44, 24.2% from 45 to 64, and 13.6% who were 65 years of age or older. The median age was 37 years. For every 100 females, there were 105.6 males. For every 100 females age 18 and over, there were 107.1 males.

The median income for a household in the township was $36,141, and the median income for a family was $41,528. Males had a median income of $28,945 versus $21,656 for females. The per capita income for the township was $15,940. About 6.5% of families and 10.2% of the population were below the poverty line, including 14.4% of those under age 18 and 7.7% of those age 65 or over.
