= Clay Township, Huntingdon County, Pennsylvania =

Township in Pennsylvania, US

Coordinates: 40°11′00″N 77°58′59″W

- Township
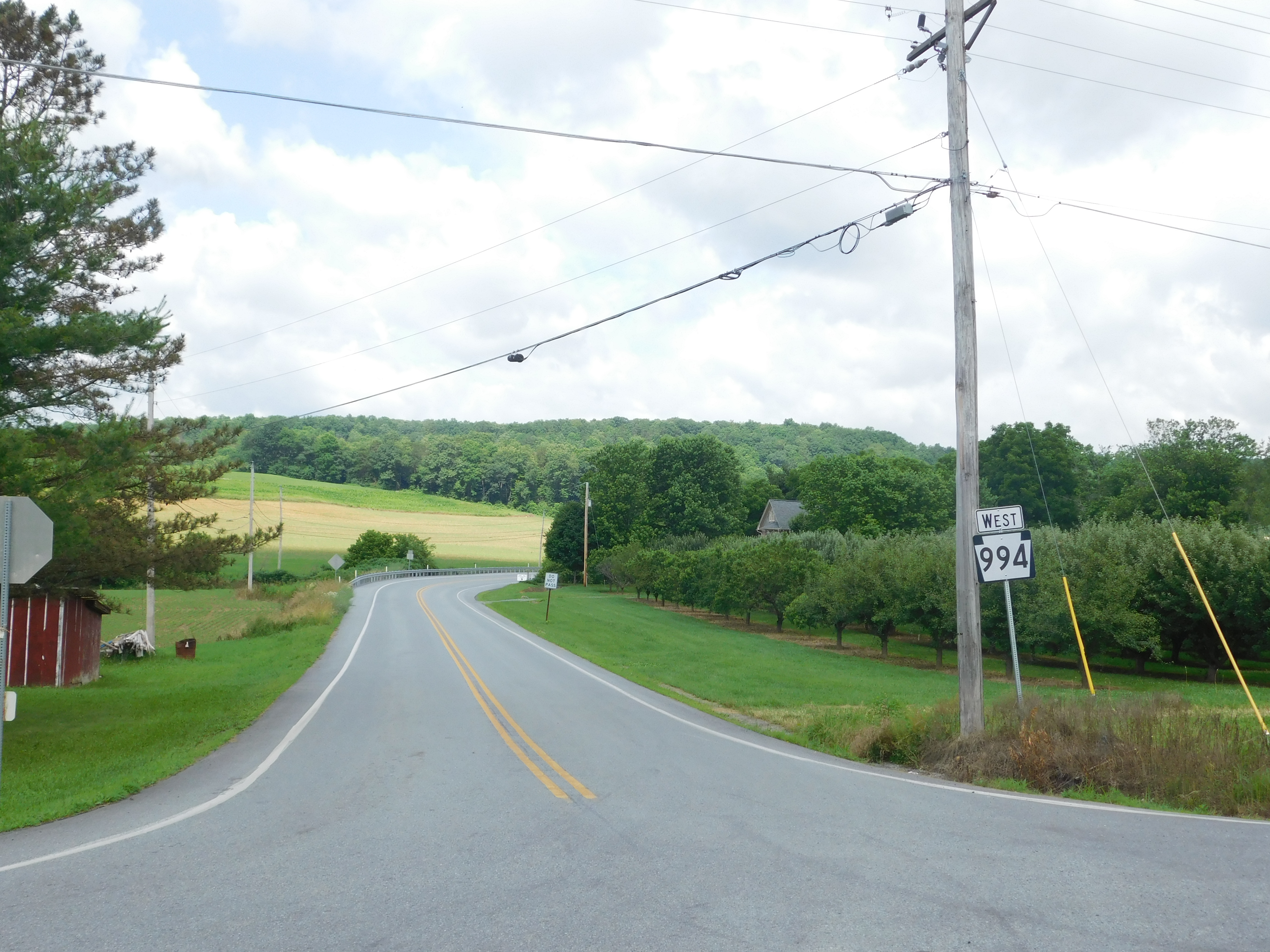
- Westbound PA 994 in Clay Township

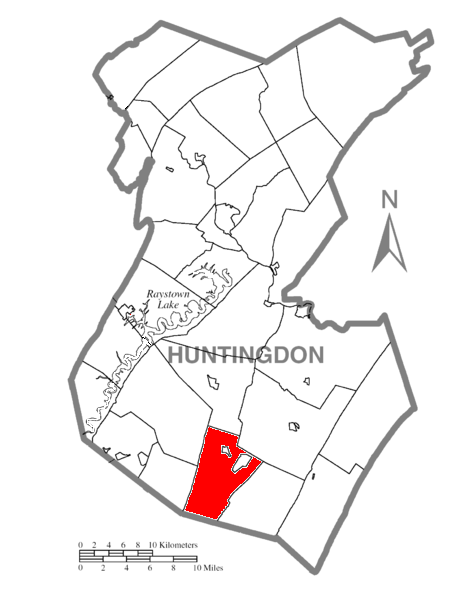
- Map of Huntingdon County, Pennsylvania Highlighting Clay Township

- Map of Huntingdon County, Pennsylvania
- Country: United States
- State: Pennsylvania
- County: Huntingdon

Area
  - Total: 28.46 sq mi (73.72 km^{2})
  - Land: 28.46 sq mi (73.72 km^{2})
  - Water: 0 sq mi (0.00 km^{2})

Population (2020)
  - Total: 872 ▼
  - Estimate (2022): 856
  - Density: 31.8/sq mi (12.29/km^{2})
- Time zone: UTC-5 (Eastern (EST))
  - Summer (DST): UTC-4 (EDT)
- FIPS code: 42-061-13944

Clay Township is a township in Huntingdon County, Pennsylvania, United States. The population was 872 at the 2020 census.

== General information ==
- ZIP Codes: 17253, 17264
- Area Code: 814
- Local Phone Exchanges: 447, 448
- School District: Southern Huntingdon County School District

== Geography ==
According to the United States Census Bureau, the township has a total area of 28.2 square miles (73 km^{2}), all land.

== Demographics ==
Historical population
Census	Pop.	Note	%±
2000	920		—
2010	926		0.7%
2020	872		−5.8%
2022 (est.)	856		−1.8%
U.S. Decennial Census

At the 2000 census there were 920 people in 370 households, including 283 families, in the township. The population density was 32.6 inhabitants per square mile (12.6/km^{2}). There were 494 housing units at an average density of 17.5/sq mi (6.8/km^{2}). The racial makeup of the township was 99.02% White, 0.11% African American, 0.11% Asian, 0.11% from other races, and 0.65% from two or more races. There were 370 households, 31.6% had children under the age of 18 living with them, 66.5% were married couples living together, 5.7% had a female householder with no husband present, and 23.5% were non-families. 20.0% of households were made up of individuals, and 10.3% were one person aged 65 or older. The average household size was 2.49 and the average family size was 2.85.

The age distribution was 23.3% under the age of 18, 6.5% from 18 to 24, 26.5% from 25 to 44, 27.2% from 45 to 64, and 16.5% 65 or older. The median age was 40 years. For every 100 females, there were 99.1 males. For every 100 females age 18 and over, there were 101.7 males.

The median household income was $30,966 and the median family income was $34,250. Males had a median income of $31,992 versus $18,750 for females. The per capita income for the township was $15,282. About 5.6% of families and 9.2% of the population were below the poverty line, including 11.5% of those under age 18 and 9.1% of those age 65 or over.
