= Taylor Township, Fulton County, Pennsylvania =

Township in Pennsylvania, United States

Coordinates: 40.09°N 78.03°W

Taylor Township
- Township
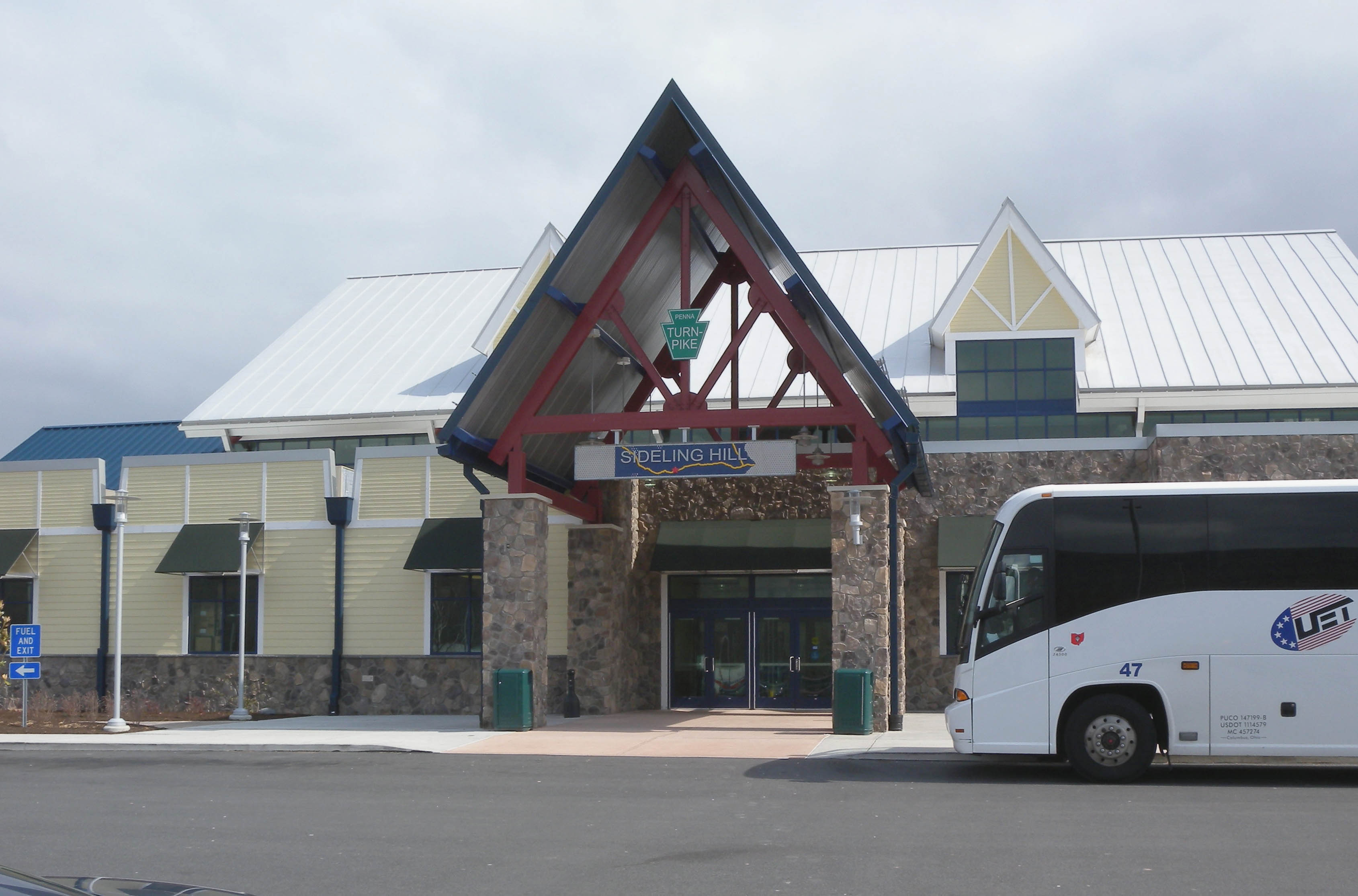
- Sideling Hill Plaza on the Pennsylvania Turnpike

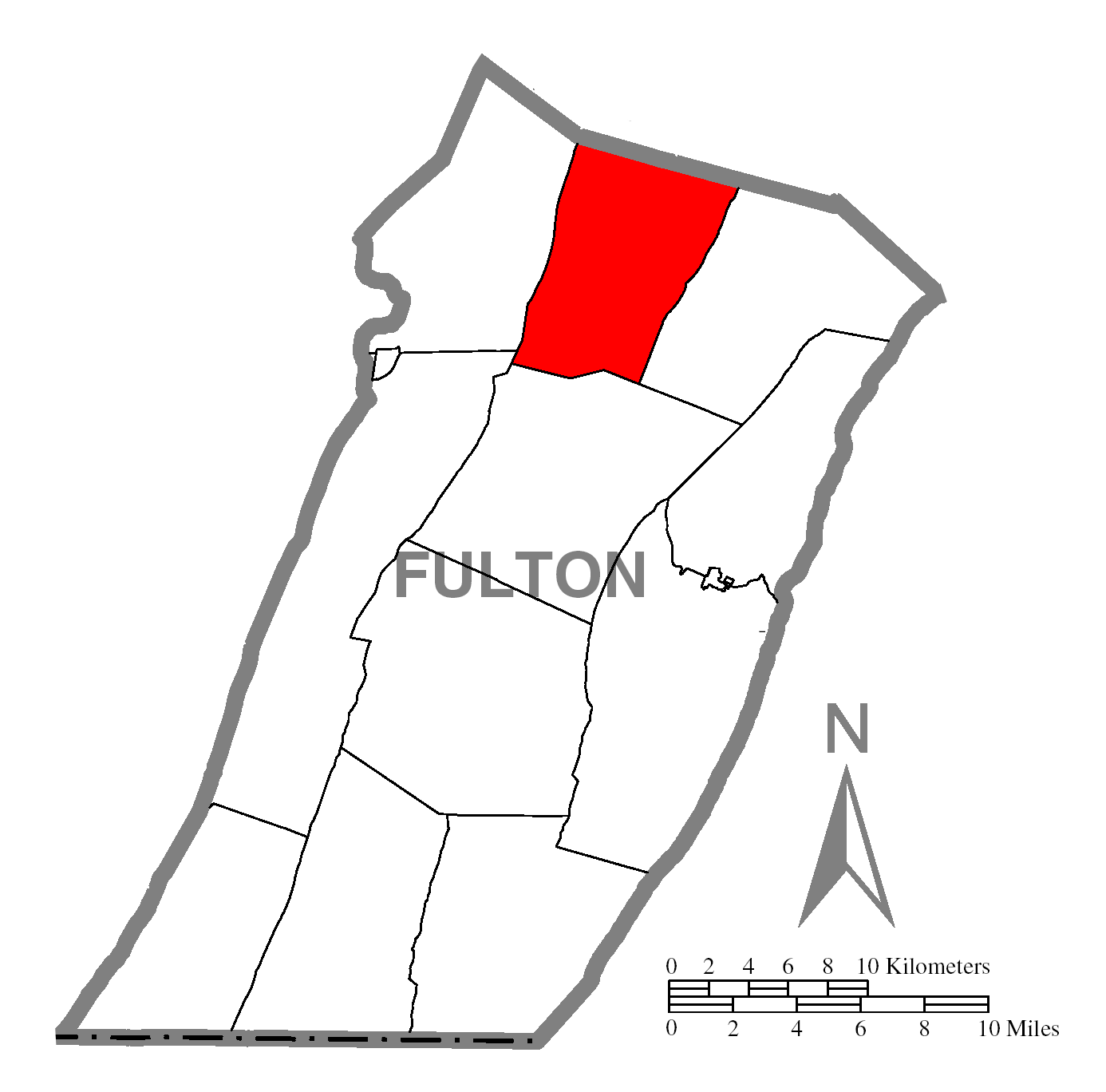
- Location of Taylor Township in Fulton County

- Location of Fulton County in Pennsylvania
- Country: United States
- State: Pennsylvania
- County: Fulton County
- Established: 1821

Area
  - Total: 32.64 sq mi (84.55 km^{2})
  - Land: 32.64 sq mi (84.54 km^{2})
  - Water: 0.0039 sq mi (0.01 km^{2})

Population (2020)
  - Total: 1,058 ▼
  - Estimate (2023): 1,051
  - Density: 33.4/sq mi (12.91/km^{2})
- Time zone: UTC-4 (EST)
  - Summer (DST): UTC-5 (EDT)
- FIPS code: 42-057-76176

Taylor Township is a township in Fulton County, Pennsylvania, United States. The population was 1,058 at the 2020 census.

== Geography ==
According to the United States Census Bureau, the township has a total area of 32.7 square miles (84.6 km^{2}), all land.

== Demographics ==
Historical population
Census	Pop.	Note	%±
2000	1,237		—
2010	1,118		−9.6%
2020	1,058		−5.4%
2023 (est.)	1,051		−0.7%
U.S. Decennial Census

As of the census of 2000, there were 1,237 people, 490 households, and 358 families residing in the township. The population density was 37.9 inhabitants per square mile (14.6/km^{2}). There were 568 housing units at an average density of 17.4/sq mi (6.7/km^{2}). The racial makeup of the township was 99.11% White, 0.08% African American, 0.49% Native American, 0.08% from other races, and 0.24% from two or more races. Hispanic or Latino of any race were 0.24% of the population.

There were 490 households, out of which 33.1% had children under the age of 18 living with them, 62.4% were married couples living together, 7.1% had a female householder with no husband present, and 26.9% were non-families. 24.7% of all households were made up of individuals, and 13.7% had someone living alone who was 65 years of age or older. The average household size was 2.52 and the average family size was 2.98.

In the township the population was spread out, with 26.6% under the age of 18, 5.7% from 18 to 24, 29.3% from 25 to 44, 23.4% from 45 to 64, and 15.0% who were 65 years of age or older. The median age was 38 years. For every 100 females, there were 101.8 males. For every 100 females age 18 and over, there were 97.4 males.

The median income for a household in the township was $34,013, and the median income for a family was $39,792. Males had a median income of $30,556 versus $17,250 for females. The per capita income for the township was $15,461. About 4.8% of families and 7.6% of the population were below the poverty line, including 10.6% of those under age 18 and 9.7% of those age 65 or over.
