= Entriken, Pennsylvania =

Unincorporated community in Pennsylvania, US

- Unincorporated community
- Location within Pennsylvania Location within the United States
- Coordinates: 40°20′02″N 78°11′56″W
- Country: United States
- State: Pennsylvania
- County: Huntingdon
- Township: Lincoln
- Elevation: 906 ft (276 m)
- Time zone: UTC-5 (Eastern (EST))
  - Summer (DST): UTC-4 (EDT)
- ZIP code: 16638
- Area code: 814
- GNIS feature ID: 1174284

Entriken is an unincorporated community in Huntingdon County, Pennsylvania, United States. The community is located near the intersection of Pennsylvania Route 26 and Pennsylvania Route 994, 3.6 miles (5.8 km) south-southwest of Marklesburg. Entriken had a post office until September 28, 2002; it still has its own ZIP code, 16638.
