= Sideling Hill Creek (Aughwick Creek tributary) =

River in Pennsylvania, United States

Coordinates: 39.68777°N 78.32256°W

Sideling Hill Creek is a 21.9-mile-long (35.2 km) tributary of Aughwick Creek in Huntingdon County, Pennsylvania in the United States. Via Aughwick Creek and the Juniata River, it is part of the Susquehanna River watershed.

Sideling Hill Creek joins Aughwick Creek near the community of Maddensville.

== Bridges ==
- The Frehn Bridge crosses Sideling Hill Creek at Springfield Township.

== See also ==
- List of rivers of Pennsylvania
