= Huntingdon Area Senior High School =

High school in Pennsylvania, United States

Location
- 2400 Cassady Avenue; Huntingdon, (Huntingdon County), Pennsylvania 16652; United States; 40.504311°N 78.010857°W

Information
- Type: Public high school
- Principal: Sean Cummins
- Staff: 46.35 (FTE)
- Enrollment: 561 (2023-24)
- Student to teacher ratio: 12.10
- Colors: Blue, red, and white
- Nickname: Bearcats
- Website: Huntingdon Area High School

Huntingdon Area Senior High School is a public high school, located in Huntingdon Borough, Pennsylvania, that educates about 800 students in grades 9–12 in the Huntingdon Area School District.

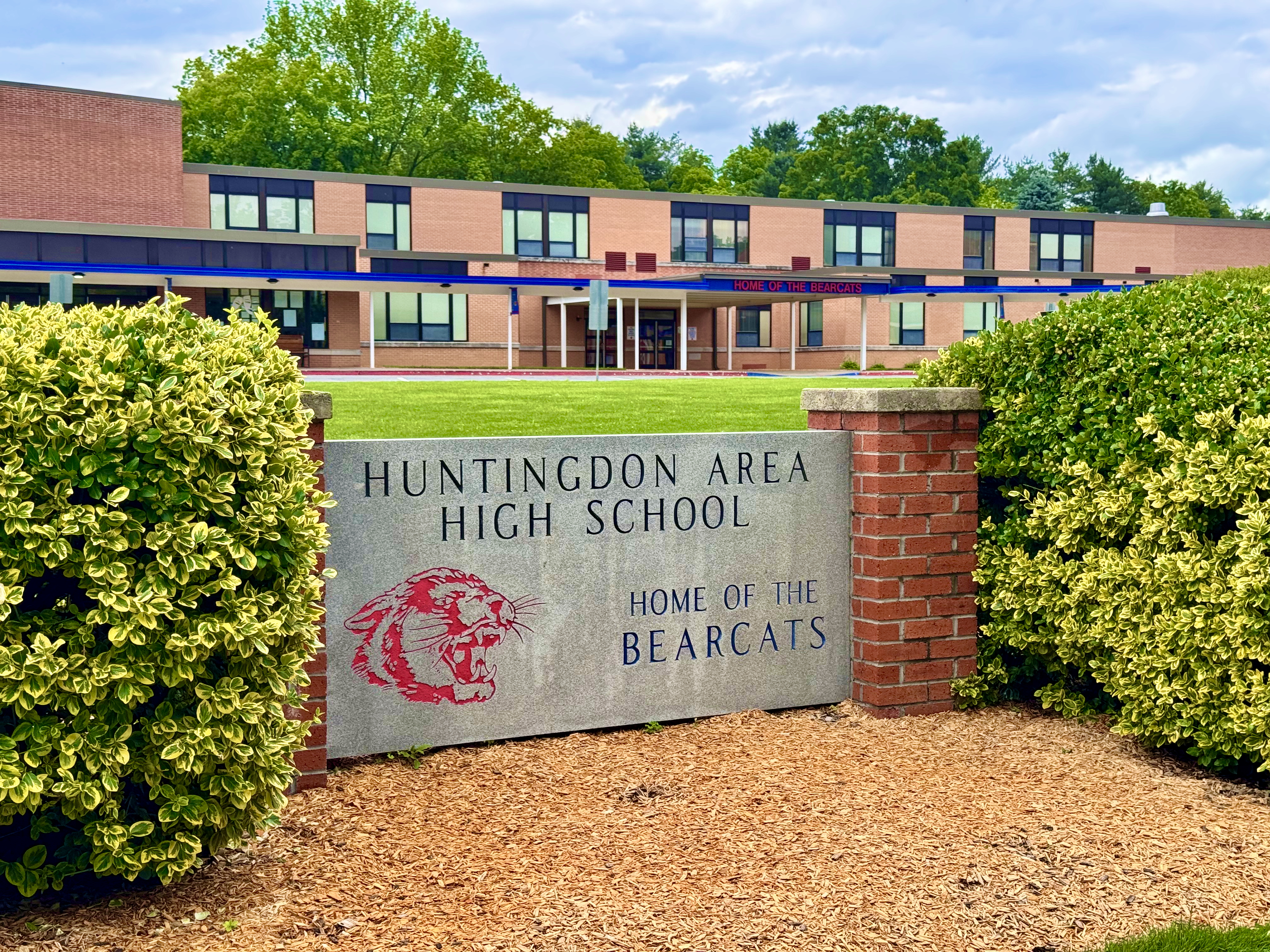
Huntingdon Area Senior High School

== History ==
The current school, located at 2400 Cassady Ave., was dedicated on January 15, 1961. The former high school was located at the corner of 10th and Moore streets in Huntingdon.

== Vocational opportunities ==
Students in grades 10–12 at Huntingdon Area High School have the opportunity to attend the Huntingdon County Career and Technology Center, located in Mill Creek, Pennsylvania.
