= Mount Union Area Senior High School =

Public high school in Mount Union, Pennsylvania, U.S.

Coordinates: 40.3899°N 77.8758°W

Mount Union Area Senior High School is a public high school, located in Mount Union Borough, Pennsylvania, that educates students in grades 9–12 in the Mount Union Area School District.

== Vocational opportunities ==
Students in grades 10–12 at Huntingdon Area High School have the opportunity to attend the Huntingdon County Career and Technology Center, located in Mill Creek, Pennsylvania.
