= Southern Huntingdon County Middle/High School =

Coordinates: 40.214225°N 77.924087°W

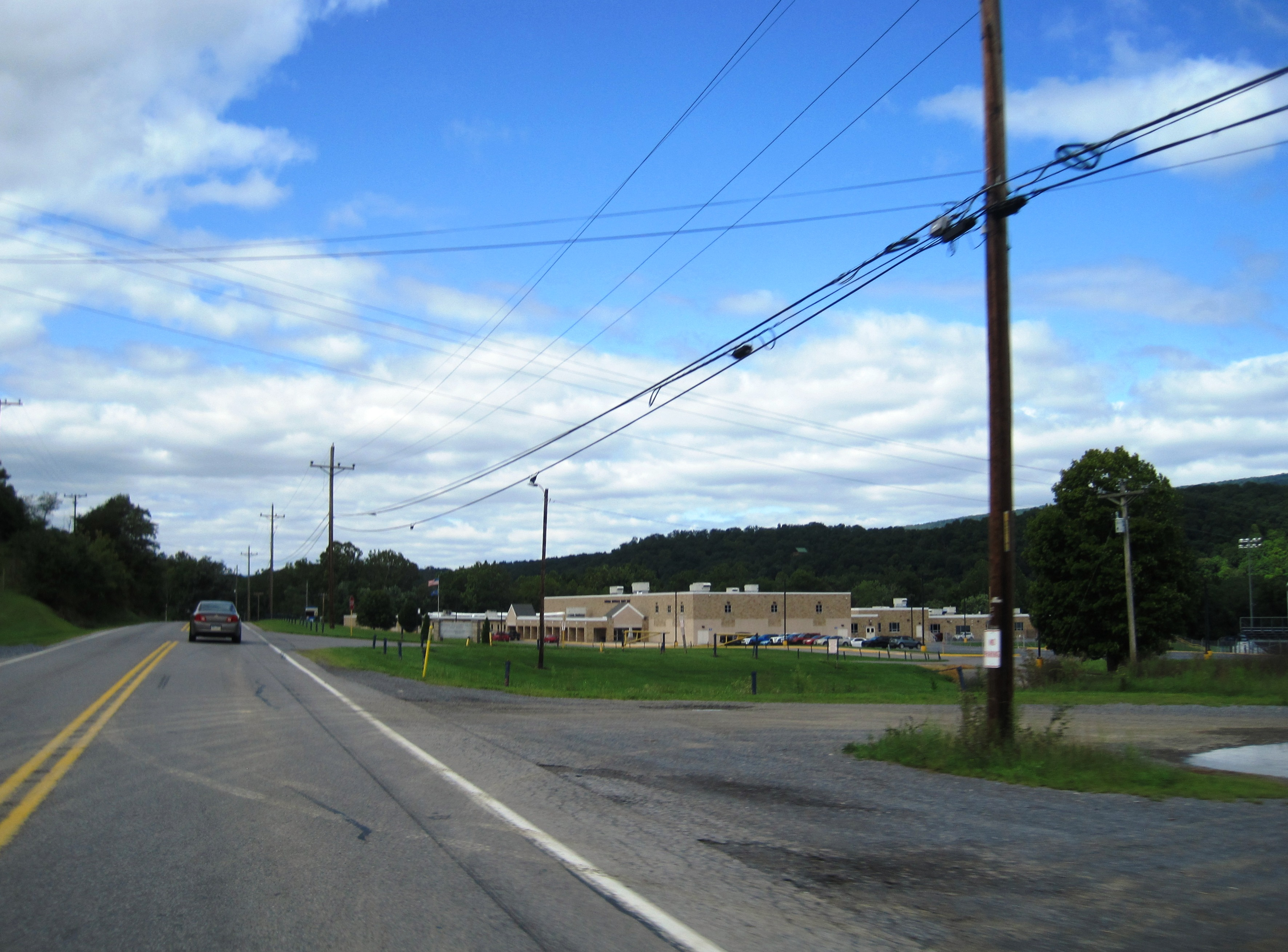
- Photo of school from PA 994

Location
- 10339 Pogue Road; Three Springs, Pennsylvania 17264; United States

Information
- School type: Public
- Established: September 1, 1961
- School district: Southern Huntingdon County School District
- Superintendent: Dwayne Northcraft
- Principal: Clint Heath
- Staff: 27
- Faculty: 45
- Grades: 6-12
- Enrollment: 695
  - Grade 6: 104
  - Grade 7: 88
  - Grade 8: 93
  - Grade 9: 100
  - Grade 10: 98
  - Grade 11: 101
  - Grade 12: 104
- Colors: Blue, White and Gold
- Athletics conference: PIAA District VI
- Mascot: Rockets
- Nickname: Southern Huntingdon County HS/MS
- Rival: Mt. Union
- Newspaper: The Flash
- Feeder schools: Rockhill, Spring Farms, and Shade Gap Elementary Schools
- Website: https://shcsd.org/high-school-middle-school/

Southern Huntingdon County High School\Middle School is a public middle & high school, located in Cromwell Township in southeastern Huntingdon County, Pennsylvania that houses about 700 students in grades 6-12 that reside in the twelve municipalities that make up the Southern Huntingdon County School District.

== School History ==
The school's construction began on July 11, 1960 with first commencement exercises were conducted on June 1, 1962, combining seniors of Orbisonia and Saltillo High Schools. Occupancy of the school campus began on September 1, 1962 with dedication ceremonies held on November 4 of that same year. The building was renovated in 2004, adding a middle school to the building, after which the school was named its current name.

== Principals ==
=== High School Principals ===
| Principal Name | Years served |
|---|---|
| John O. Yetter | 1962–1971 |
| Robert S. McCoy | 1971–1981 |
| Dr. Edwin Hasson | 1982–1987 |
| John Hodge* | 1987–1988 |
| Dr. Edwin Hasson | 1988–1993 |
| Robert A. Alcaro | 1993–1997 |
| M. Catherine Brouse | 1997–2006 |
| Fred E. Foster | 2006–2007 |
| David R Fassett | 2007–2009 |
| Janet D. Kaltreider | 2009–2013 |
| Michael Adamek | 2013–2017 |
| Clint Heath | 2017–present |

* Denotes an acting position

=== Middle School Principals ===
| Principal Name | Years served |
|---|---|
| Fred E. Foster | 2004–2006 |
| Timothy J. Miller | 2006–2011 |
| Michael Adamek | 2013–Present |

== Athletics ==
Southern Huntingdon is in PIAA District 6

| Sport | Boys (Class) | Girls (Class) |
|---|---|---|
| Baseball | Class A | |
| Basketball | Class AA | Class AA |
| Field Hockey | | Class AA |
| Football | Class A | |
| Softball | | Class AA |
| Track and Field | Class AA | Class AA |
| Wrestling | Class AA | |

Sports for the middle school level (Grades 7 and 8) include:
Boys: Basketball, Football, Wrestling
Girls: Basketball. Softball

== Vocational opportunities ==
Students in grades 10–12 have the opportunity to attend the Huntingdon County Career and Technology Center in Mill Creek.
