= Ira J. Deen =

American painter

- Born: Ira J. Deen; December 9, 1874; Mount Union, Pennsylvania, United States
- Died: July 7, 1952 (aged 77)
- Known for: Painting
- Movement: American Impressionism, Pennsylvania plein air Impressionism

Ira J. Deen (December 9, 1874 – June 7, 1952) was an American artist.

Born in Mount Union, Pennsylvania, Deen moved with his family to Harrisburg in 1891 when he was 16 where he took a job painting city electric trolley cars for the Harrisburg Traction Co. Deen was known for his impressionist nature and landscape paintings of the Susquehanna River and other areas of Pennsylvania countryside.
