= Frehn Bridge =

- U.S. National Register of Historic Places
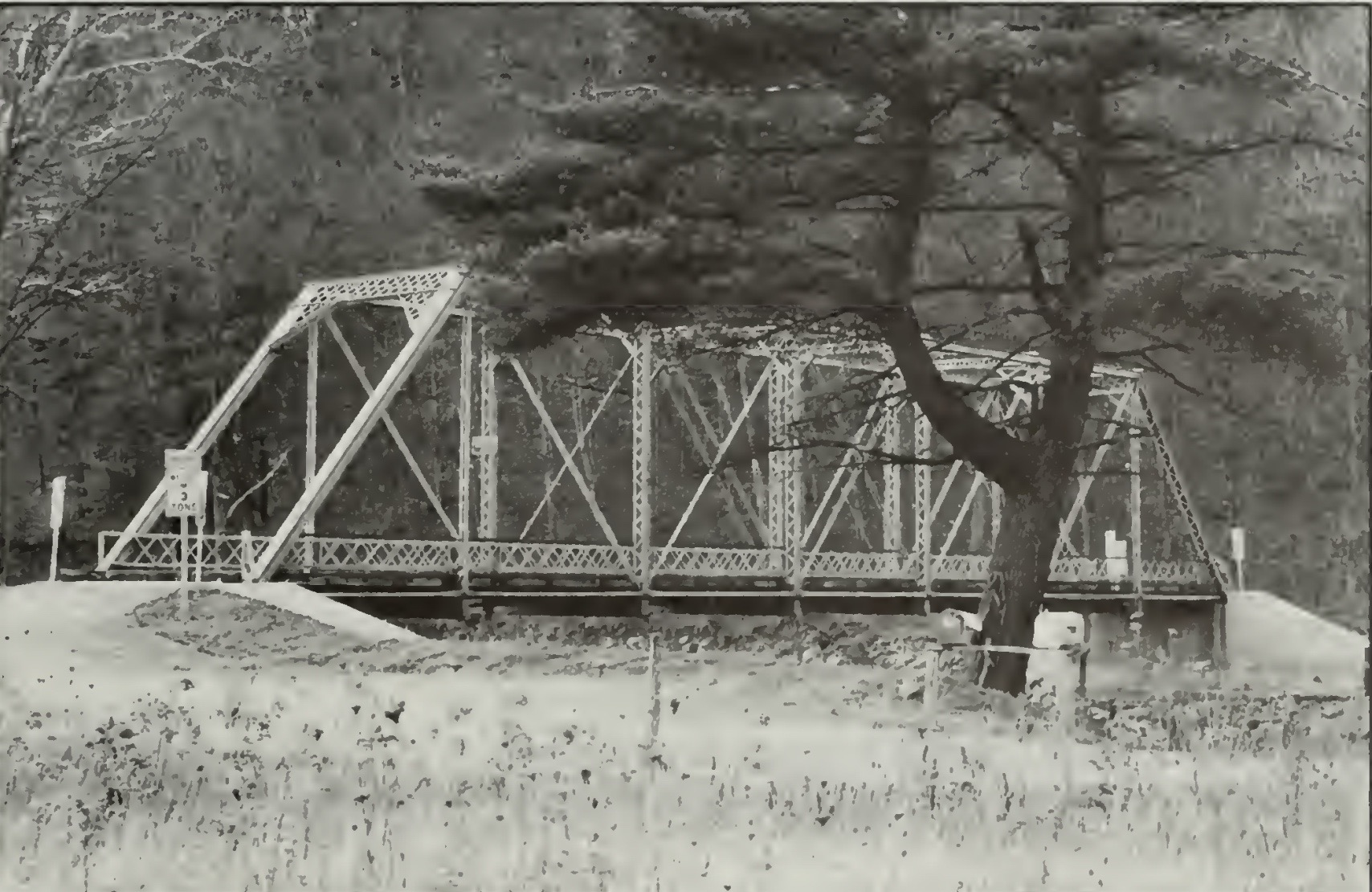
- 1990 HABS/HAER photo

- Location within Pennsylvania Location within the United States
- Location: Township Route 313, 2 miles (3.2 km) west of Pennsylvania Route 475, Springfield Township, Pennsylvania
- Coordinates: 40°8′0″N 77°59′29″W
- Area: less than one acre
- Built: 1890
- Architectural style: Pratt through truss bridge
- MPS: Industrial Resources of Huntingdon County, 1780-1939 MPS
- NRHP reference No.: 90000391
- Added to NRHP: March 20, 1990

Frehn Bridge, also known as Huntingdon County Bridge No. 1, was a historic Pratt truss bridge spanning Sideling Hill Creek and located at Springfield Township, Huntingdon County, Pennsylvania. It was built in 1890, and measured 120-foot-long (37 m) in length and had a 13.75-foot-wide (4.19 m) timber deck.

It was added to the National Register of Historic Places in 1990.

The bridge has been demolished and replaced with a modern structure.
