= St. Mary's Covered Bridge =

Covered bridge in Pennsylvania, US

- U.S. National Register of Historic Places
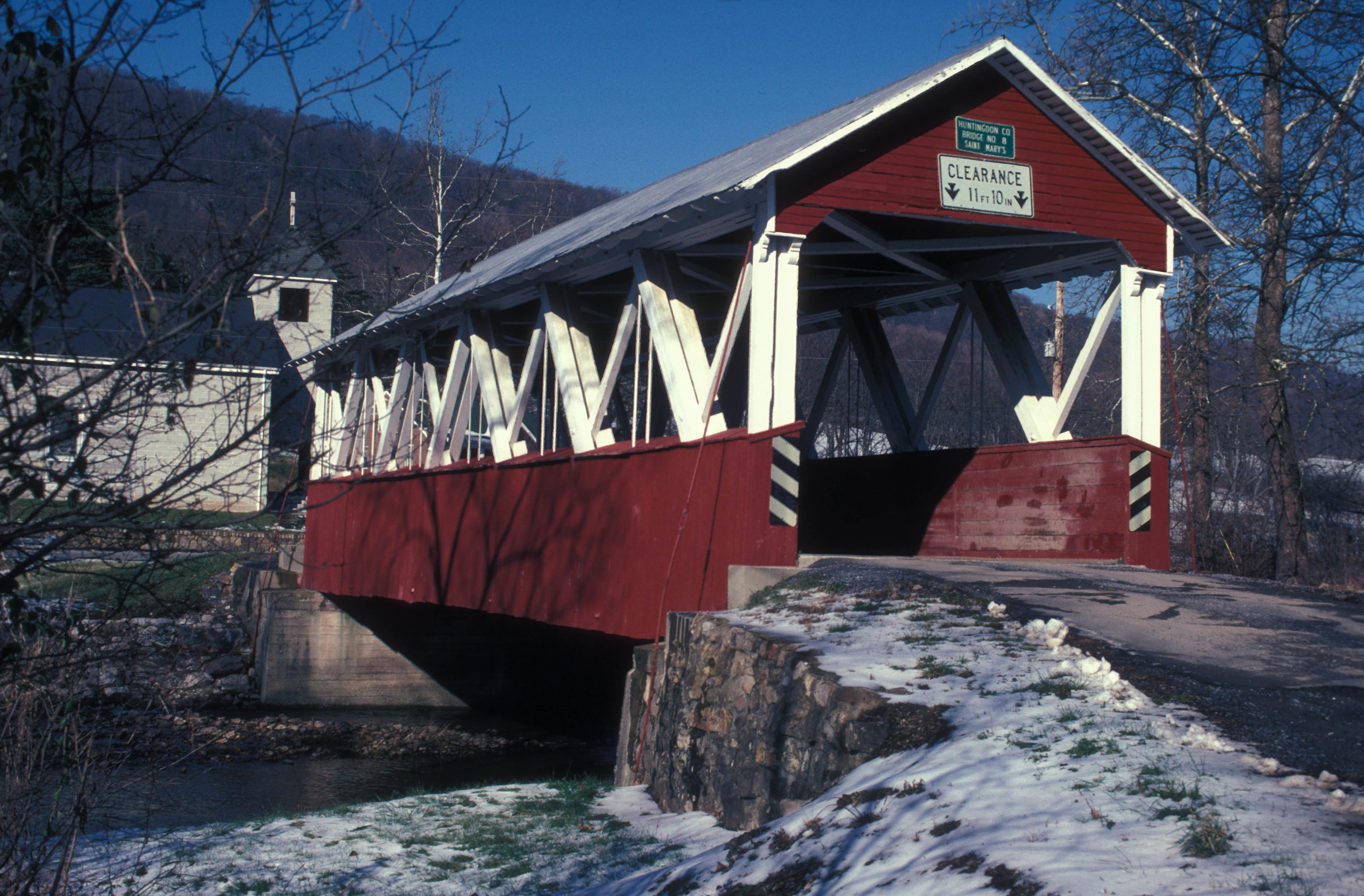

- Location within Pennsylvania Location within the United States
- Location: 4.5 miles (7.2 km) south of Orbisonia on U.S. Route 522, Cromwell Township, Pennsylvania
- Coordinates: 40°12′21″N 77°52′42″W
- Area: 0.1 acres (0.040 ha)
- Built: 1889
- Architectural style: Howe truss
- NRHP reference No.: 80003503
- Added to NRHP: March 20, 1980

The St. Mary's Covered Bridge, also known as Shade Gap Covered Bridge and Huntingdon County Bridge No. 8, is a historic wooden covered bridge located at Cromwell Township in Huntingdon County, Pennsylvania, USA. It is a 65.25-foot-long (19.89 m) 16.5-foot-wide (5.0 m), Howe truss bridge with cut stone abutments, constructed in 1889. It crosses the Shade Creek and is the only remaining covered bridge in Huntingdon County.

It was listed on the National Register of Historic Places in 1980.
