= Huntingdon County Career and Technology Center =

Coordinates: 40.436658°N 77.928235°W

Location
- 11893 Technology Drive; Mill Creek, Pennsylvania 17060

Information
- Type: Public, Vocational
- Motto: "Training Tomorrow's Workforce Today"
- Director: Don Burd
- Faculty: 18
- Grades: 10-12
- Schedule: Part-Time
- Website: http://www.hcctc.org/

Huntingdon County Career and Technology Center (HCCTC) is a small rural vocational school that serves the area around Huntingdon County, Pennsylvania. Its classes are open to 10th graders to 12th graders in local high schools and in special circumstances to 9th graders. A satellite campus of Pennsylvania Highlands Community College is also located inside the building.

== Career and Technology Center ==
The Huntingdon County Career and Technology Center is large one building location on 11893 Technology Drive, Mill Creek, PA 17060.

It was formerly called Huntingdon County Area Vocational-Technical (Vo-Tech) School until the late-1990s (around 96–97) and then renamed the Huntingdon County Career and Technology Center.

== Associate districts ==
School district	High School	Class Time Session
Huntingdon Area School District	Huntingdon Area Senior High School	PM
Juniata Valley School District	Juniata Valley Junior/Senior High School	AM
Mount Union Area School District	Mount Union Area Senior High School	AM
Southern Huntingdon County School District	Southern Huntingdon County Middle/High School	PM
