= Southern Huntingdon County School District =

School district in Pennsylvania

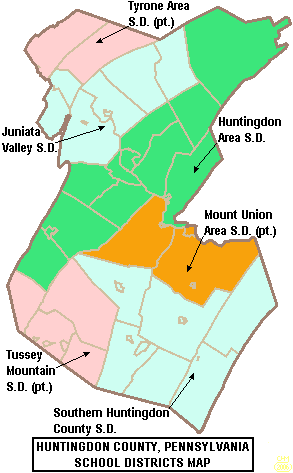

Address
- 10339 Pogue Road Three Springs, PA, 17264; United States

District information
- Type: Public
- Established: 1956
- Superintendent: Dwayne Northcraft

Students and staff
- District mascot: Rockets
- Colors: Blue, White, and Gold

Other information
- Website: http://shcsd.org/

The Southern Huntingdon County School District is a public rural school district based in the southeastern part of Huntingdon County, Pennsylvania in Three Springs, Pennsylvania. The school district includes all of Three Springs Borough, Cassville Borough, Orbisonia Borough, Rockhill Furnace Borough, Saltillo Borough, Shade Gap Borough, and including the townships of Cass Township, Clay Township, Cromwell Township, Dublin Township, Springfield Township and Tell Township. The district encompasses approximately 221 square miles. According to 2000 federal census data, it serves a resident population of 8,030.

== District history ==
The Southern Huntingdon County School System became effective on July 1, 1956, at which time all school boards of all twelve municipalities signed the district's Articles of Agreement. Two high Schools were consolidated (Orbisonia and Saltillo). Rockhill and Shade Gap Elementary Schools were the first two buildings constructed in 1956, followed by Spring Farms and Trough Creek Valley Elementary Schools in 1961, consolidating 55 one-room schoolhouses into only four buildings. Ground was broken on the High School on July 11, 1960, students occupied the facility on September 1, 1962, and dedication was held November 4 that year. In 2004, a renovation/addition project was completed adding a middle school to the secondary campus. The final action was completed on July 1, 1966, officially forming the Southern Huntingdon County School District.

Superintendents

Superintendent	Years served
Fred G. Angle	1962–1978
John O. Yetter	1978–1982
Dr. Gerald D. Bau	1982–1987
Dr. Edward Hasson*	1987–1988
Harry J. King	1988–1994
Dr. Charles J. Borchetta	1995–1997
Anthony F. Labriola	1997
Robert W. Holmes*	1997
Ronald G. Fourtney	1998–2002
Charles P. McCabe	2002–2005
Grant Stiffler	2005–2010
Dr. Tod Kline	2010–2015
Stacey Miller*	2015
Mr. Michael Zinobile	2015–2016
Stacey Miller*	2016
Mr. Dwayne Northcraft	Current

* Denotes Acting Superintendent

== Schools ==
The Southern Huntingdon County School District operates one combined high school/middle school and three elementary schools. The school also sends students to the regional career & technology center, used by every school district in Huntingdon County. The district administrative office is located on 10339 Pogue Road, Three Springs, PA 17264.

=== Middle and high school ===
- Southern Huntingdon County Middle/High School (Grades 6–12)
  10339 Pouge Road
  Three Springs, Pennsylvania 17264

=== Elementary schools ===
There are three Elementary Schools, all Grades K–5

- Rockhill Elementary School
  510 Meadow Street
  Rockhill Furnace, Pennsylvania 17249
- Spring Farms Elementary School
  12075 Old Plank Road
  Three Springs, Pennsylvania 17264
- Shade Gap Elementary School
  22251 Shade Valley Road
  Shade Gap, Pennsylvania 17255

== Extracurriculars ==
The district offers a variety of clubs, activities and sports.

=== Athletics ===
- Baseball - Class AA
- Basketball - Class AA
- Cross Country - Class A
- Girls Field Hockey - Class AA
- Girls Volleyball
- Football - Class AA
- Track and Field - Class AA
- Wrestling - Class AA

== Career and technology centers ==
- Huntingdon County Career and Technology Center - Mill Creek - Grades 10–12
