= Cassville, Pennsylvania =

Borough in Pennsylvania, US

Cassville, Pennsylvania Chilcoatstown
- Borough
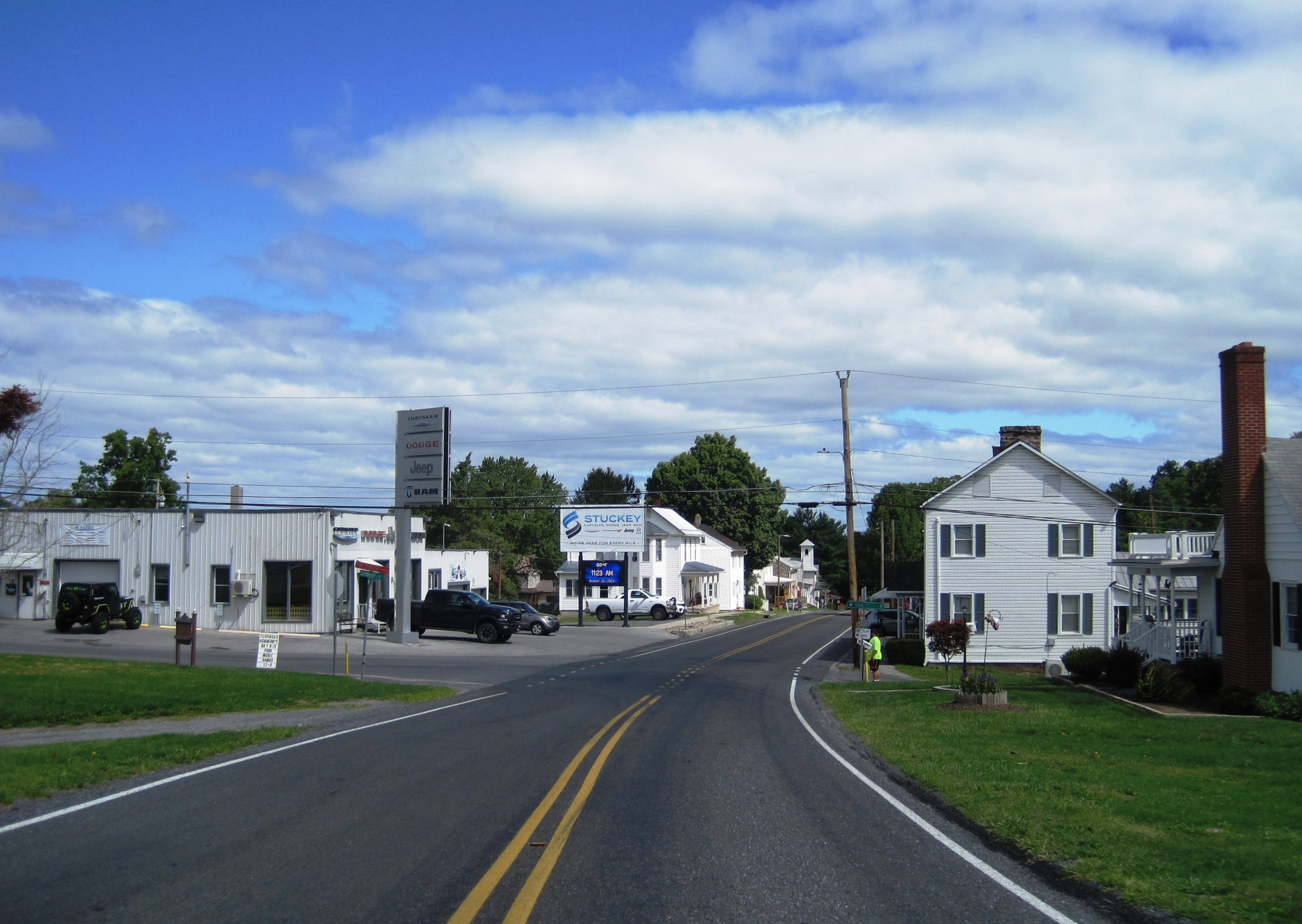
- Northbound PA 829 in Cassville

- Location of Cassville in Huntingdon County, Pennsylvania

- Location within Pennsylvania Location within the United States
- Coordinates: 40°17′34″N 78°01′38″W
- Country: United States
- State: Pennsylvania
- County: Huntingdon

Government
  - Type: Borough Council

Area
  - Total: 0.59 sq mi (1.54 km^{2})
  - Land: 0.59 sq mi (1.54 km^{2})
  - Water: 0 sq mi (0.00 km^{2})
- Elevation: 1,243 ft (379 m)

Population (2020)
  - Total: 135
  - Density: 227.7/sq mi (87.91/km^{2})
- Time zone: UTC-5 (Eastern (EST))
  - Summer (DST): UTC-4 (EDT)
- ZIP code: 16623
- Area code: 814
- FIPS code: 42-11632
- GNIS feature ID: 1215267
- Local phone exchanges: 447, 448

Cassville is a borough in Huntingdon County, Pennsylvania, United States. As of the 2020 census, the borough population was 138.

== Geography ==
Cassville is located in south-central Huntingdon County at an elevation of 1,241 feet (378 m). It sits at the western base of Sideling Hill, which rises 400 feet (120 m) above the borough. Shirley Knob rises 600 feet (180 m) above the borough to the southwest.

Pennsylvania Route 829 passes through the center of Cassville, leading north 12 miles (19 km) to U.S. Route 22, near Mill Creek and south over Sideling Hill 7 miles (11 km) to Saltillo.

According to the United States Census Bureau, Cassville has a total area of 0.6 square miles (1.6 km^{2}), all land.

== Demographics ==
Historical population
| Census | Pop. | Note | %± |
|---|---|---|---|
| 1860 | 266 | | — |
| 1870 | 416 | | 56.4% |
| 1880 | 188 | | −54.8% |
| 1890 | 185 | | −1.6% |
| 1900 | 168 | | −9.2% |
| 1910 | 165 | | −1.8% |
| 1920 | 133 | | −19.4% |
| 1930 | 111 | | −16.5% |
| 1940 | 142 | | 27.9% |
| 1950 | 158 | | 11.3% |
| 1960 | 208 | | 31.6% |
| 1970 | 205 | | −1.4% |
| 1980 | 183 | | −10.7% |
| 1990 | 183 | | 0.0% |
| 2000 | 152 | | −16.9% |
| 2010 | 143 | | −5.9% |
| 2020 | 135 | | −5.6% |
| 2021 (est.) | 136 | ▲ | 0.7% |

As of the census of 2000, there were 152 people, 65 households, and 46 families residing in the borough. The population density was 266.6 inhabitants per square mile (102.9/km^{2}). There were 69 housing units at an average density of 121.0 per square mile (46.7/km^{2}). The racial makeup of the borough was 100.00% White.

There were 65 households, out of which 24.6% had children under the age of 18 living with them, 60.0% were married couples living together, 7.7% had a female householder with no husband present, and 29.2% were non-families. 29.2% of all households were made up of individuals, and 18.5% had someone living alone who was 65 years of age or older. The average household size was 2.34 and the average family size was 2.87.

In the borough the population was spread out, with 20.4% under the age of 18, 7.9% from 18 to 24, 27.6% from 25 to 44, 18.4% from 45 to 64, and 25.7% who were 65 years of age or older. The median age was 42 years. For every 100 females there were 90.0 males. For every 100 females age 18 and over, there were 86.2 males.

The median income for a household in the borough was $30,625, and the median income for a family was $33,500. Males had a median income of $29,375 versus $18,333 for females. The per capita income for the borough was $13,628. About 11.4% of families and 9.9% of the population were below the poverty line, including none of those under the age of eighteen and 12.5% of those sixty five or over.
