= Mount Union Area School District =

School district in Pennsylvania

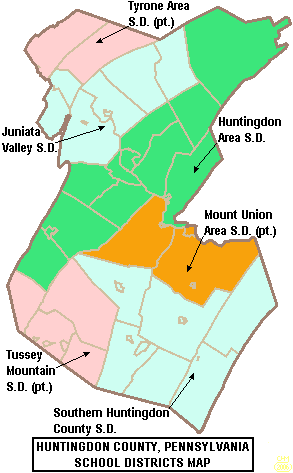

Address
- 603 North Industrial Drive Mount Union, Pennsylvania, 17066; United States

District information
- Type: Public
- Superintendent: Jen Taylor

Students and staff
- Students: 1108
- Athletic conference: PIAA District 6 - Inter County Conference
- District mascot: Trojans
- Colors: Royal Blue and Vegas Gold

Other information
- Website: https://www.muasd.org

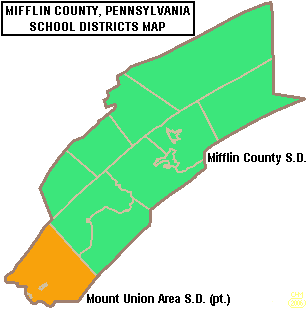
Map of Mifflin County, Pennsylvania School Districts showing a part of Mount Union Area School District

The Mount Union Area School District is a public school district based in Mount Union, Pennsylvania. The district encompasses approximately 151 square miles. According to 2000 federal census data, it serves a resident population of 9,678. The school district includes all of Mount Union borough, Mapleton borough, Shirleysburg borough, Shirley Township and Union Township in Huntingdon County. The school district also includes Kistler borough, Newton Hamilton borough, and Wayne Township, all located in Mifflin County.

== Schools ==
- Kistler Elementary School - (Grades K-2)
  154 School Street
  Mount Union, Pennsylvania 17066
- Shirley Township Elementary School - (Grades 3-5)
  14188 2nd Street
  Mount Union, Pennsylvania 17066
- Mount Union Area Junior High School - (Grades 6-8)
  Pine Street
  Mount Union, Pennsylvania 17066
- Mount Union Area Senior High School - (Grades 9-12)
  706 N. Shaver Street
  Mount Union, Pennsylvania 17066
- Academy for Customized Learning
  706 N. Shaver Street
  Mount Union, Pennsylvania 17066

== Career & Technology Centers ==
High school students can attend Huntingdon County Career & Technology Center - Mill Creek - Grades 10-12

== Extracurriculars ==
Athletics:

- Baseball (boys)
- Basketball (girls & boys)
- Bocce (co-ed)
- Cross-Country (co-ed)
- Football (boys)
- Soccer (boys)
- Softball (girls)
- Track (co-ed)
- Volleyball (girls)
- Wrestling (boys)

Music

Mount Union participates in competitive marching band in the Tournament of Bands Circuit. The group has earned much recognition within the circuit for numerous competitive victories. Additionally, the band has performed in highly visible parades such as: The West Virginia Strawberry Festival, New York City Veterans’ Day Parade, and the Washington D.C. Centennial Parade for the Boy Scouts of America.

Additionally, Mount Union was formerly home to a County-Wide Indoor Percussion Ensemble, known as Darkhorse Percussion, which hosted students from across Huntingdon County. Since 2022, the unit has been hosted by the Juniata Valley School District because Mount Union no longer saw fit to officially support the ensemble despite not having supported it for several years.

The unit formed in November 2014 and is composed of students from Southern Huntingdon County School District, Juniata Valley School District, Williamsburg Community School District, Huntingdon Area School District and Mount Union Area School District. The unit is a six time Atlantic Coast Champion in 2017, 2018, 2019, 2022, 2024, and 2025. The unit competes in the Tournament Indoor Association, sponsored by the National Judges Association.

Additionally, Darkhorse Percussion added a secondary ensemble in 2024 titled Darkhorse Percussion Stationary. This ensemble competes under the Tournament Indoor Association as well. Darkhorse Percussion Stationary has won Region XI Championships in 2025 and 2026.
