= Juniata Valley School District =

School district in Pennsylvania

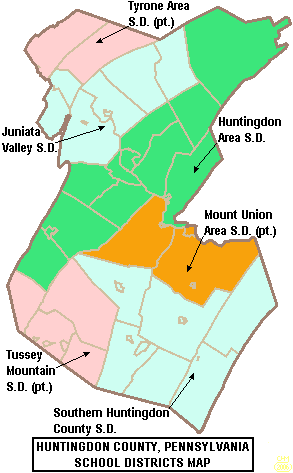

Address
- 7775 Juniata Valley Pike Alexandria, Pennsylvania, 16611; United States

District information
- Type: Public

Students and staff
- District mascot: Hornets
- Colors: Green and White

Other information
- Website: http://www.jvsd.org

The Juniata Valley School District, commonly abbreviated JVSD, is a rural public school district based in the borough of Alexandria, Pennsylvania. The school district includes all of Alexandria borough, Petersburg borough, Barree Township, Logan Township, Porter Township, West Township, Morris Township and Spruce Creek township. The district encompasses approximately 125 square miles. According to 2000 federal census data, it serves a resident population of 5,334.

== Schools ==
Juniata Valley Junior-Senior High School

The Juniata Valley School District operates one junior/high school, one elementary school. The school also sends students to the regional career & technology center, used by other three school districts in Huntingdon County. The district office is located on 7775 Juniata Valley Pike, Alexandria, PA 16611.

- Juniata Valley Junior-Senior High School - Alexandria - Grades 6-12
  - 7775 Juniata Valley Pike, Alexandria, PA 16611
- Juniata Valley Elementary School - Alexandria - Grades K-5
  - 7855 Juniata Valley Pike, Alexandria, PA 16611

== Extracurriculars ==
The district offers a variety of clubs, activities and sports.

=== Athletics ===
- Baseball - Class A
- Basketball - Class A
- Cross Country - Class AA
- Football - Class A
- Softball - Class A
- Track and Field - Class AA
- Volleyball - Class A
- Wrestling - Class AA

State Championships

- 1996 Class A Basketball State Champs PIAA Basketball State Champs

=== Music & Fine Arts ===
The Juniata Valley School District is host to a variety of music and fine arts programs including marching band, concert band, jazz band, junior and senior high choir ensembles, indoor percussion, and a middle school winter guard program.

The Juniata Valley "Pride of the Valley" marching band competes within the Tournament of Bands (TOB) circuit sponsored by the National Judges Association (NJA). In 2010, they were named Region XI champions within the Allegheny Mountain Region of TOB.

Since 2022, the school district has hosted Darkhorse Percussion, a central Pennsylvania based indoor marching percussion program that is open to students in grades 7-12 from Juniata Valley School District, Mount Union Area School District, Huntingdon Area School District, Williamsburg Community School District and Southern Huntingdon County School District. The organization was formed in 2014 and was hosted at Mount Union Area School District until 2021 and then relocating to Juniata Valley School District in 2022. As of 2024, the program added a second unit titled "Darkhorse Stationary" for developing junior percussionists in grades 6-9. Both units compete in the Tournament Indoor Association (TIA), sponsored by the National Judges Association.

The marching percussion unit is a six time TIA Atlantic Coast Champion having secured titles in the 2017, 2018, 2019, 2022, 2024 and 2025 competitive seasons.
