= Huntingdon Area School District =

School district in Pennsylvania

Coordinates: 40.50304°N 78.01162°W

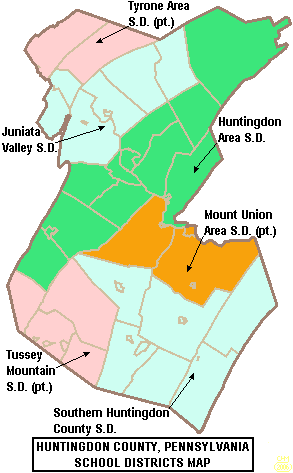

Address
- 2400 Cassady Ave Ste 2 Huntingdon, Pennsylvania, 16652-2618; United States

District information
- Type: Public

Other information
- Website: www.huntsd.org

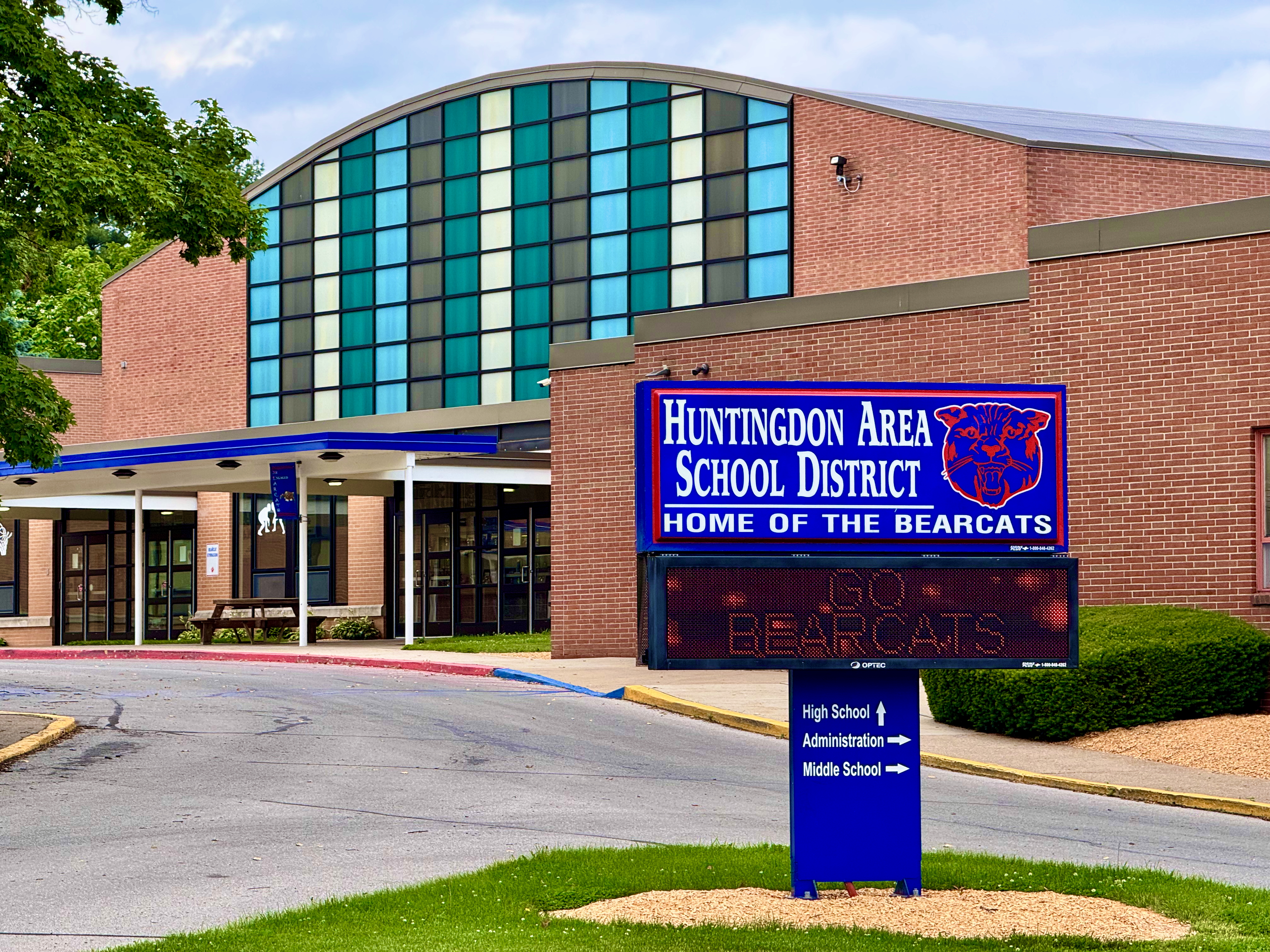
Huntingdon Area School District headquarters

Huntingdon Area High School

Location
- 2400 Cassady Ave. Ste. 1 Huntingdon, Pennsylvania 16652

Information
- Type: Public high school
- Opened: 1960
- School district: Huntingdon Area School District
- Principal: Mr. Sean Cummins
- Grades: 9–12
- Enrollment: 732 (2010-2011)
- Language: English
- Hours in school day: 7:50 AM-2:45 PM
- Campus type: Rural
- Colors: Red and Blue
- Mascot: Bearcat
- Rivals: Mount Union Area High School; Tyrone Area High School
- Website: HAHS Webpage

Huntingdon Area Middle School

Location
- 2500 Cassady Ave. Huntingdon, Pennsylvania 16652

Information
- Type: Public middle school
- Opened: 2012
- School district: Huntingdon Area School District
- Principal: Mr. Nicholas Payne
- Grades: 6–8
- Enrollment: 484 (2010-2011)
- Language: English
- Hours in school day: 7:50 AM-2:45 PM
- Campus type: Rural
- Colors: Red, and Blue
- Mascot: Bearcat
- Website: HAMS Webpage

Standing Stone Elementary School

Location
- 10 W 29th St. Huntingdon, Pennsylvania 16652

Information
- Type: Public elementary school
- Opened: 1999
- Principal: Mr. John Miller
- Grades: K–5
- Enrollment: 448 (2010-2011)
- Language: English
- Campus type: Rural
- Colors: Red and Blue
- Mascot: Bearcat
- Website: Standing Stone Webpage

Southside Elementary School

Location
- 10906 Station Rd. Huntingdon (McConnellstown), Pennsylvania 16652

Information
- Type: Public elementary school
- Opened: 1997
- Principal: Mr. Gregory Shingle
- Grades: K–5
- Enrollment: 329 (2010-2011)
- Language: English
- Campus type: Rural
- Colors: Red and Blue
- Mascot: Bearcat
- Website: Southside Webpage

The Huntingdon Area School District, commonly abbreviated HASD, is a midsized rural public school district based in the borough of Huntingdon, Pennsylvania. The school district includes all of Huntingdon borough, Brady Township, Smithfield Township, Henderson Township, Juniata Township, Walker Township, Oneida Township, Penn Township, Marklesburg borough, Jackson Township, Mill Creek borough, Miller Township, and Lincoln Township. The district encompasses approximately 286 square miles (740 km^{2}). The school's mascot is the bearcat. The school's official colors are red and blue.

== Schools ==
The Huntingdon Area School District operates one high school, one middle school, and two elementary schools. The district office is located at 2400 Cassady Avenue, Suite 2, Huntingdon, PA 16652.

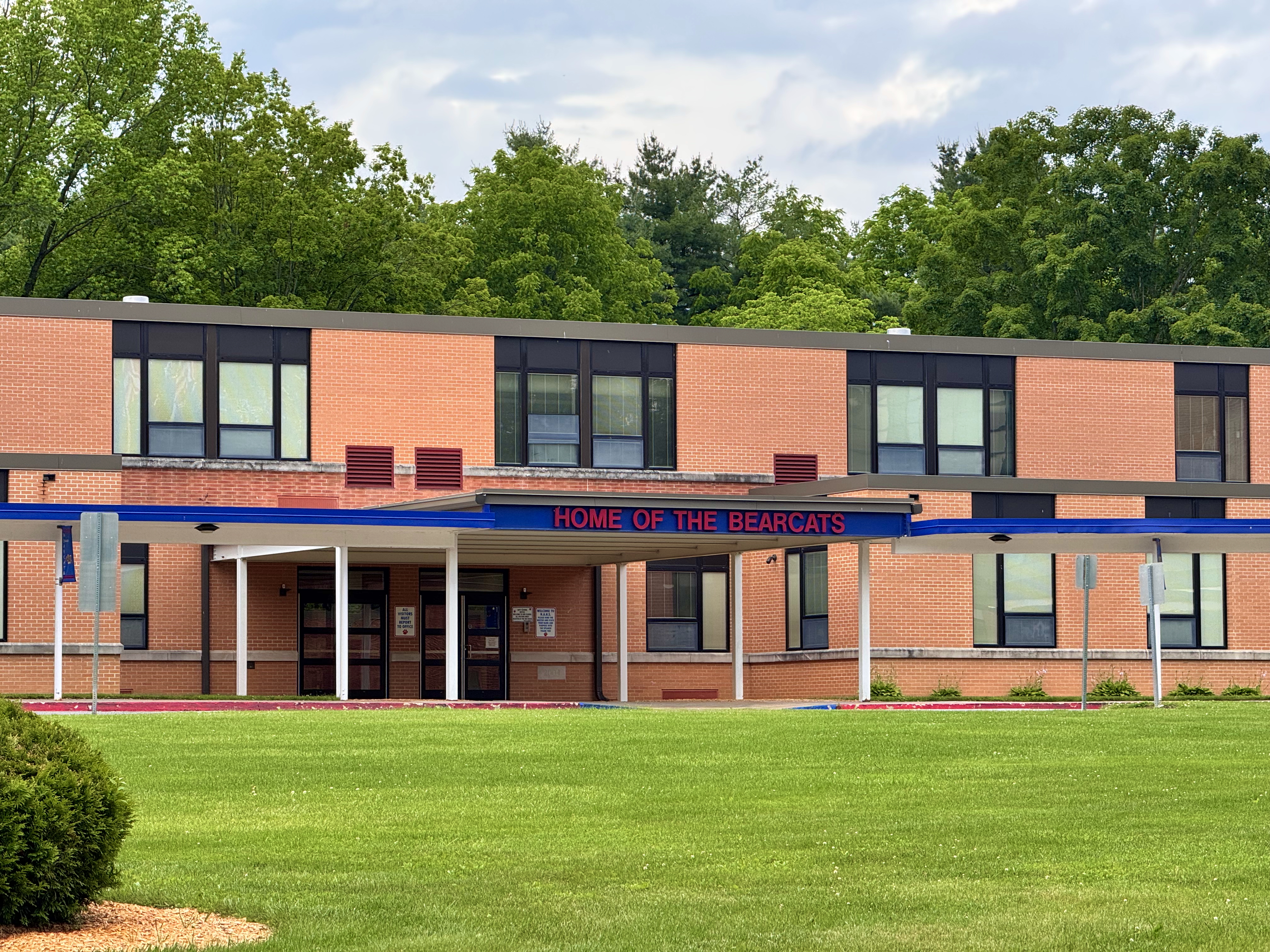
Huntingdon Area Senior High School

- Huntingdon Area Senior High School - Huntingdon - Grades 9-12
  - 2400 Cassady Avenue, Suite 1, Huntingdon, PA 16652
  - Opened in 1960, renovated/expanded in 2004
- Huntingdon Area Middle School - Huntingdon - Grades 6-8
  - 2500 Cassady Avenue, Huntingdon, PA 16652
  - Opened in 2012, former school opened in 1971
- Standing Stone Elementary School - Huntingdon - Grades K-5
  - 10 29th Street, Huntingdon, PA 16652
  - Opened in 1999 from the combined Alfarata Elementary and William Smith Elementary
- Southside Elementary School - McConnellstown - Grades K-5
  - 10906 Station Road, Huntingdon, PA 16652
  - Opened in 1997 from the combined Smithfield Elementary and Woodcock Valley Elementary

== Extracurriculars ==
The district offers a variety of clubs, activities and sports.

=== Athletics ===
Below is a list of all sports offered at Huntingdon .

Fall Sports

- Football
- Boys' Soccer
- Girls' Soccer
- Girls' Volleyball
- Field Hockey
- Golf
- Marching Band

Winter Sports

- Boys' Basketball
- Girls' Basketball
- Wrestling
- Swimming
- Indoor Percussion

Spring Sports

- Baseball
- Softball
- Track & Field
- Boys' Volleyball

The high school has a long history of athletics. One of the school's most well known sports team is its volleyball team, which has enjoyed much success over the years, winning the PIAA state championship in 2003. Other school sports include basketball, swimming, baseball, softball, field hockey, soccer, wrestling, tennis, track & field, football and golf. The baseball team has also won a state championship.

Music

The district proudly offers music education to all students from Pre-Kindergarten through Twelfth grade. Students begin instrumental studies as early as Kindergarten within the structured confines of their weekly music classes. Starting in 4th grade, students may begin pursuing private instrumental instruction. Third graders may begin participating in extracurricular choir offerings.

The district participates in the Pennsylvania Music Educators Association, Tournament of Bands and Tournament Indoor Association, as well as regional offerings such as the annual Issac Awards offered by the Altoona Community Theatre, in which Huntingdon has won Best Overall Production consecutively since 2022.

Extracurricular and Co-curricular offerings of marching band, indoor color guard, indoor percussion, and jazz band are offered to students in grades 7-12.

Extracurricular and Co-curricular offerings of the annual High School Musicals are offered to selected elementary and middle school students with full access granted to students in grades 9-12. On even numbered-years, Southside Elementary School offers a musical for all students in grades 2-5.

War Veterans' Field

This field is located in downtown Huntingdon. It is the home of the Huntingdon Bearcats football team.

=== Career and technology centers ===
- Huntingdon County Career and Technology Center- Mill Creek borough- Grades 10-12
