= Springfield Township, Huntingdon County, Pennsylvania =

Township in Pennsylvania, US

Coordinates: 40°08′00″N 78°00′44″W

- Township
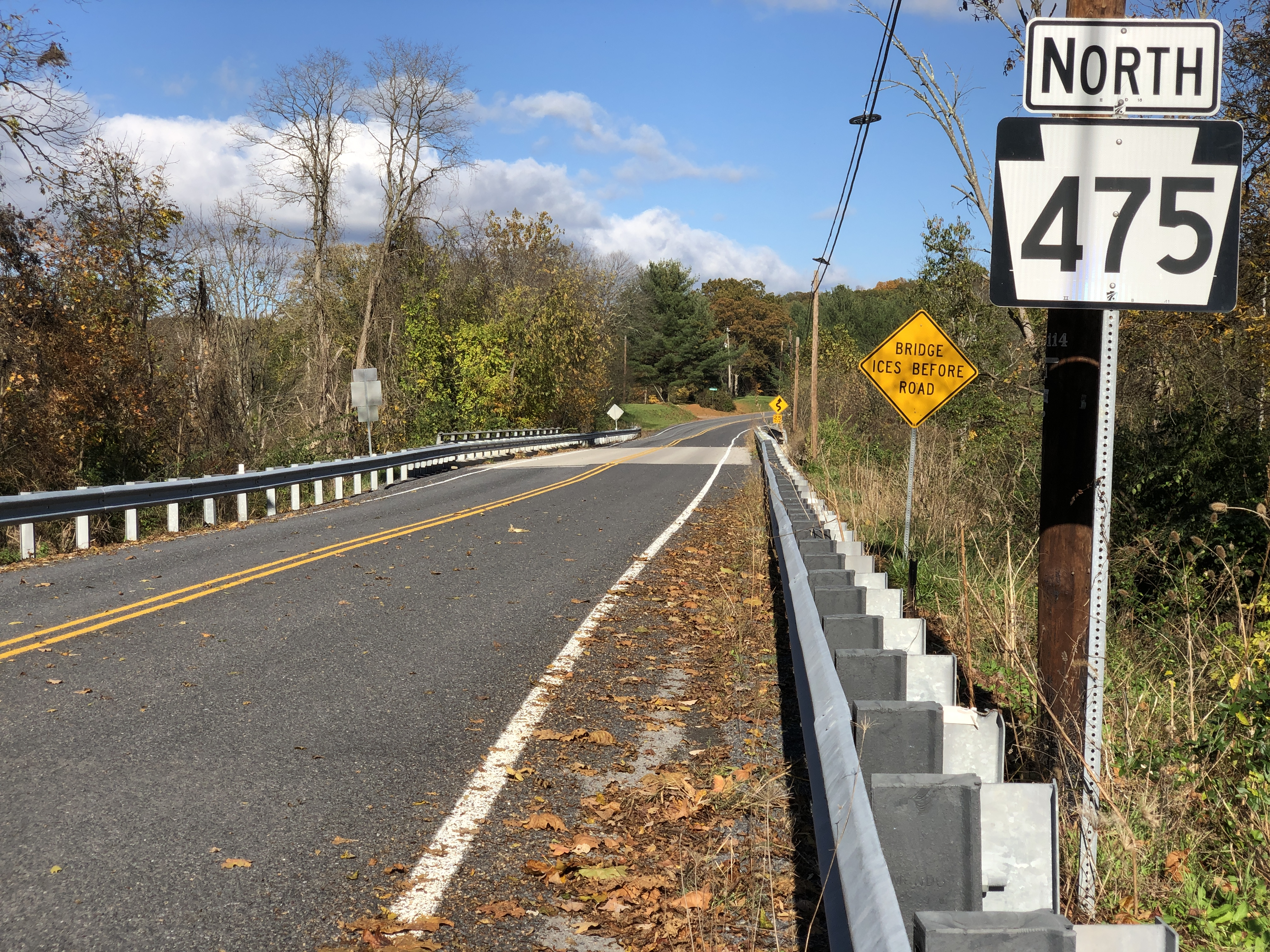
- PA 475 northbound in Springfield Township

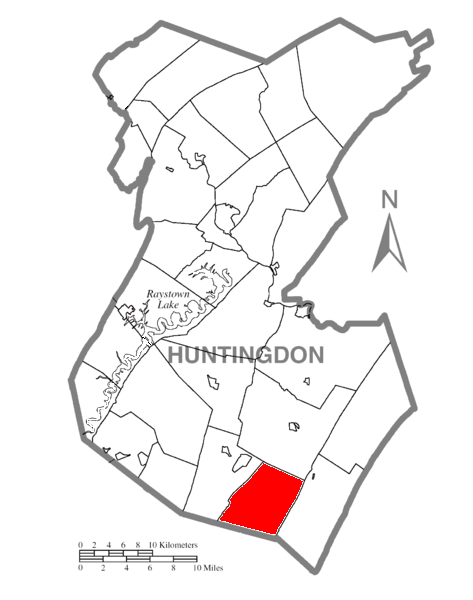
- Map of Huntingdon County, Pennsylvania Highlighting Springfield Township

- Map of Huntingdon County, Pennsylvania
- Country: United States
- State: Pennsylvania
- County: Huntingdon

Area
  - Total: 27.52 sq mi (71.27 km^{2})
  - Land: 27.52 sq mi (71.27 km^{2})
  - Water: 0 sq mi (0.00 km^{2})

Population (2020)
  - Total: 694 ▲
  - Estimate (2022): 686
  - Density: 23.5/sq mi (9.06/km^{2})
- Time zone: UTC-5 (Eastern (EST))
  - Summer (DST): UTC-4 (EDT)
- Zip code: 17264
- Area code: 814
- FIPS code: 42-061-73072

Springfield Township is a township that is located in Huntingdon County, Pennsylvania, United States. The population was 694 at the time of the 2020 census.

== General information ==
- ZIP Code: 17264
- Area Code: 814
- Local Phone Exchanges: 447, 448
- School District: Southern Huntingdon County School District

== History ==
The Frehn Bridge was listed on the National Register of Historic Places in 1990.

== Geography ==
According to the United States Census Bureau, the township has a total area of 27.9 square miles (72.2 km^{2}), all land.

== Demographics ==
Historical population
| Census | Pop. | Note | %± |
|---|---|---|---|
| 2000 | 612 | | — |
| 2010 | 654 | | 6.9% |
| 2020 | 694 | | 6.1% |
| 2022 (est.) | 686 | | −1.2% |
U.S. Decennial Census

As of the census of 2000, there were 612 people, 241 households, and 180 families residing in the township.

The population density was 22.0 people per square mile (8.5/km^{2}). There were 413 housing units at an average density of 14.8/sq mi (5.7/km^{2}). The racial makeup of the township was 99.35% White, and 0.65% from two or more races. Hispanic or Latino of any race were 0.33% of the population.

There were 241 households, out of which 32.4% had children under the age of 18 living with them; 63.5% were married couples living together, 5.4% had a female householder with no husband present, and 25.3% were non-families. 22.0% of all households were made up of individuals, and 12.9% had someone living alone who was 65 years of age or older.

The average household size was 2.54 and the average family size was 2.97.

Within the township, the population was spread out, with 24.7% under the age of 18, 5.1% from 18 to 24, 28.8% from 25 to 44, 27.1% from 45 to 64, and 14.4% who were 65 years of age or older. The median age was 40 years.

For every 100 females, there were 106.1 males. For every 100 females age 18 and over, there were 108.6 males.

The median income for a household in the township was $31,719, and the median income for a family was $33,646. Males had a median income of $29,375 versus $20,278 for females.

The per capita income for the township was $14,499.

Approximately 8.1% of families and 10.6% of the population were living below the poverty line, including 19.1% of those under the age of 18 and 12.0% of those aged 65 or older.
