= Huntingdon County, Pennsylvania =

County in Pennsylvania, United States

- County
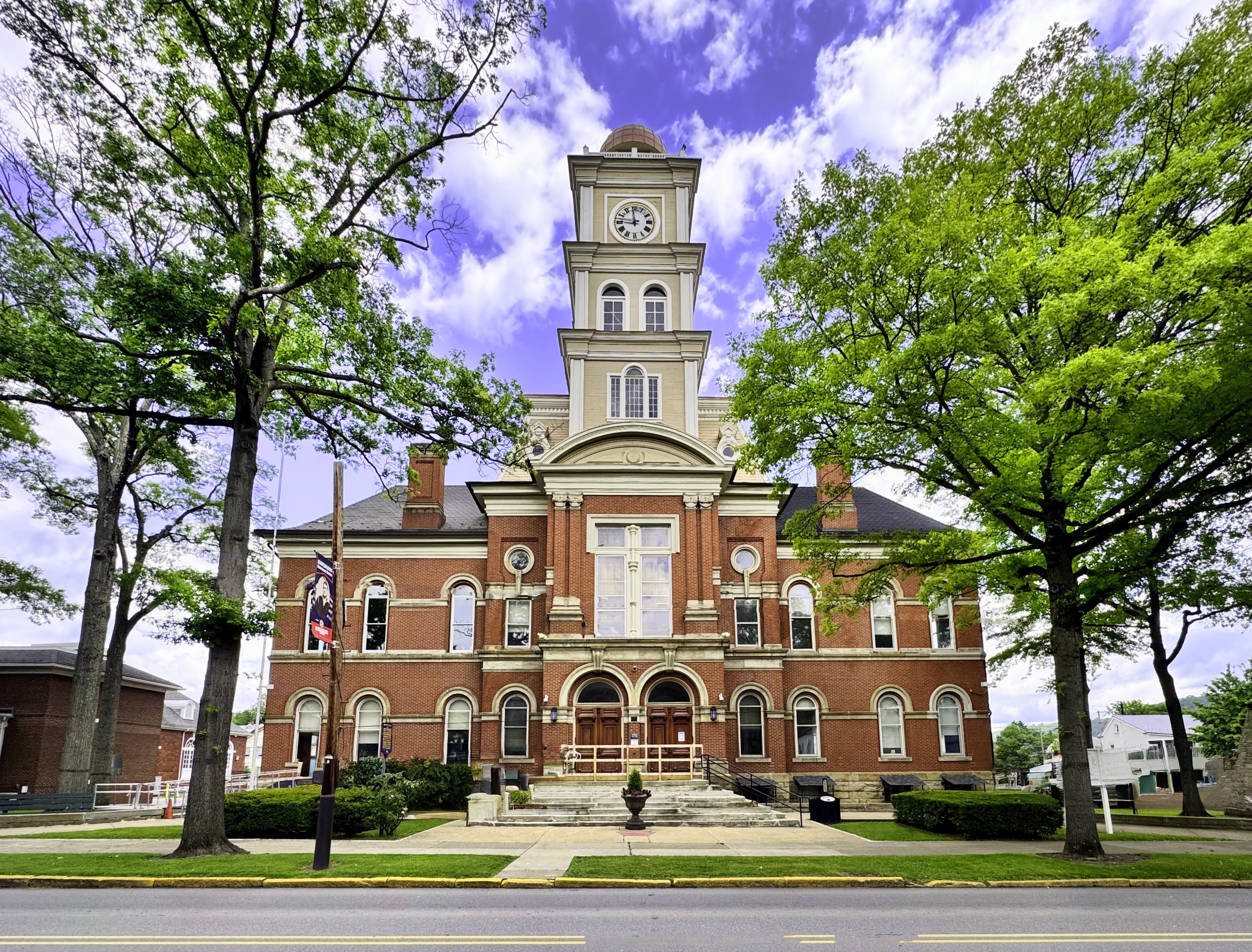
- Huntingdon County Courthouse built in 1883

- Flag Seal

- Location within the U.S. state of Pennsylvania
- Coordinates: 40°25′N 77°59′W
- Country: United States
- State: Pennsylvania
- Founded: September 20, 1787
- Named for: Selina Hastings, Countess of Huntingdon
- Seat: Huntingdon
- Largest borough: Huntingdon

Area
  - Total: 889 sq mi (2,300 km^{2})
  - Land: 875 sq mi (2,270 km^{2})
  - Water: 15 sq mi (39 km^{2}) 1.6%

Population (2020)
  - Total: 44,092
  - Estimate (2025): 43,001 ▼
  - Density: 50/sq mi (19/km^{2})
- Time zone: UTC−5 (Eastern)
  - Summer (DST): UTC−4 (EDT)
- Congressional district: 13th
- Website: www.huntingdoncounty.net

Huntingdon County is a county in the Commonwealth of Pennsylvania. As of the 2020 census, the population was 44,092. Its county seat is Huntingdon. The county was created on September 20, 1787, mainly from the northern part of Bedford County, plus an addition of territory on the east (Big Valley, Tuscarora Valley) from Cumberland County. The county is part of the Southwest region of the commonwealth. (Note: Includes Westmoreland, Cambria, Fayette, Blair, Indiana, Somerset, Bedford, Huntingdon, Greene and Fulton Counties)

Huntingdon County comprises the Huntingdon, PA Micropolitan Statistical Area.

== Geography ==
According to the U.S. Census Bureau, the county has a total area of 889 square miles (2,300 km^{2}), of which 875 square miles (2,270 km^{2}) is land and 15 square miles (39 km^{2}) (1.6%) is water. It has a humid continental climate (Dfa/Dfb) and average monthly temperatures in Huntingdon borough range from 27.8 °F in January to 72.3 °F in July. Huntingdon County is one of the 423 counties served by the Appalachian Regional Commission, and it is identified as part of "Greater Appalachia" by Colin Woodard in his book American Nations: A History of the Eleven Rival Regional Cultures of North America.

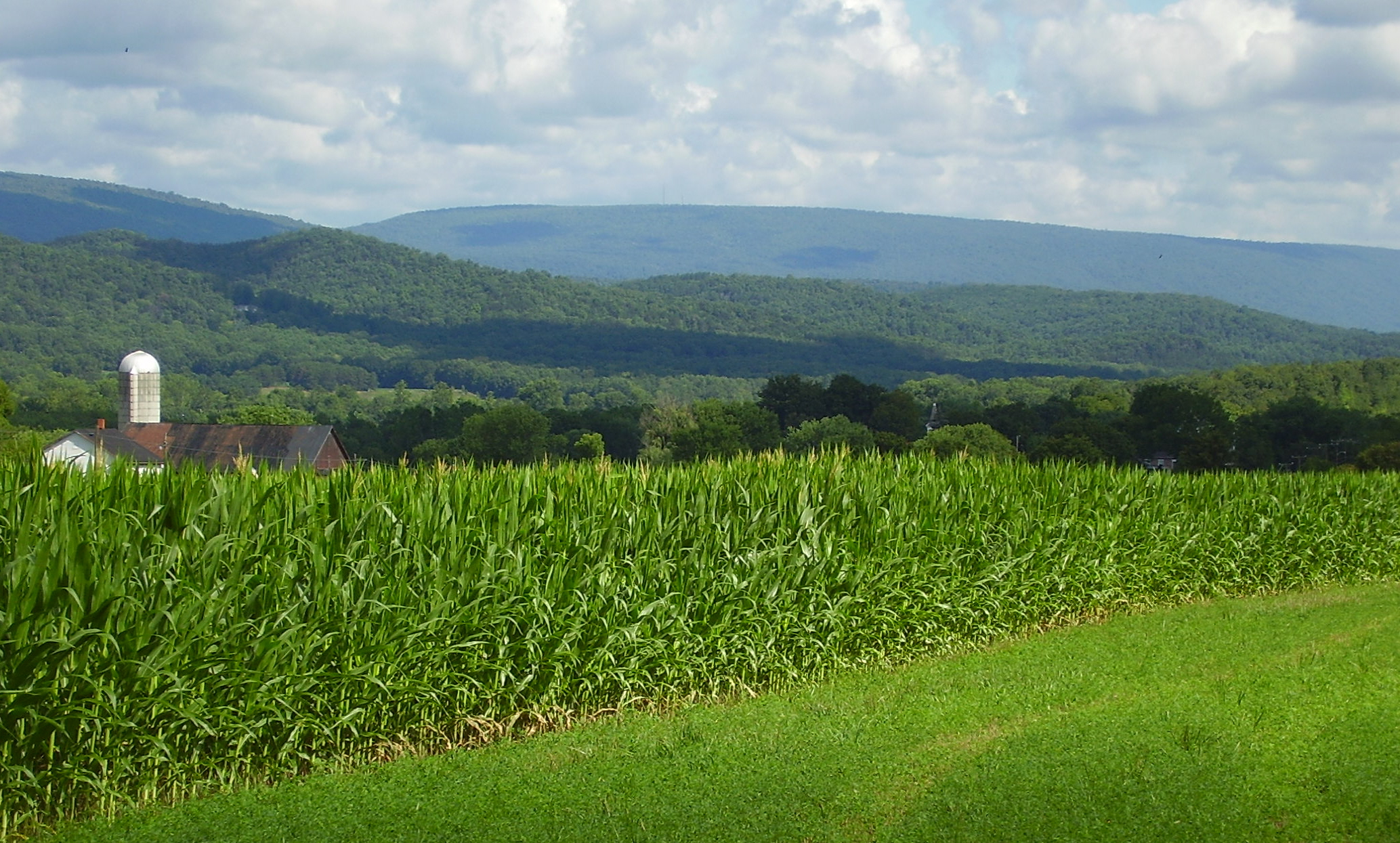
Jacks Mountain as viewed from Shirleysburg

=== Features ===
- Raystown Lake
- Tussey Mountain
- Coffee Run
- Sugar Grove Run

=== Adjacent counties ===
- Centre County (north)
- Mifflin County (east)
- Juniata County (east)
- Franklin County (southeast)
- Fulton County (south)
- Bedford County (southwest)
- Blair County (west)

== Demographics ==
Historical population
Census	Pop.	Note	%±
1790	7,558		—
1800	13,008		72.1%
1810	14,778		13.6%
1820	20,142		36.3%
1830	27,145		34.8%
1840	35,484		30.7%
1850	24,786		−30.1%
1860	28,100		13.4%
1870	31,251		11.2%
1880	33,954		8.6%
1890	35,751		5.3%
1900	34,650		−3.1%
1910	38,304		10.5%
1920	39,848		4.0%
1930	39,021		−2.1%
1940	41,836		7.2%
1950	40,872		−2.3%
1960	39,457		−3.5%
1970	39,108		−0.9%
1980	42,253		8.0%
1990	44,164		4.5%
2000	45,586		3.2%
2010	45,913		0.7%
2020	44,092		−4.0%
2025 (est.)	43,001	▼	−2.5%
U.S. Decennial Census; 1790-1960 1900-1990; 1990-2000 2010-2017

=== 2020 census ===
As of the 2020 census, the county had a population of 44,092 and a median age of 44.2 years. 18.2% of residents were under the age of 18 and 21.7% of residents were 65 years of age or older. For every 100 females there were 114.0 males, and for every 100 females age 18 and over there were 116.1 males age 18 and over.

According to the 2020 redistricting data (PL 94-171), the racial composition was 39,420 (89.4%) non-Hispanic White, 2,267 (5.14%) non-Hispanic Black or African American, 49 (0.11%) non-Hispanic Native American, 210 (0.47%) non-Hispanic Asian, 9 (0.02%) non-Hispanic Pacific Islander, 1,285 (3.0%) non-Hispanic Other/Mixed, and 852 (2.0%) Hispanic or Latino residents of any race.

25.7% of residents lived in urban areas while 74.3% lived in rural areas.

There were 16,804 households in the county, of which 25.3% had children under the age of 18 living in them. Of all households, 51.1% were married-couple households, 18.4% were households with a male householder and no spouse or partner present, and 23.6% were households with a female householder and no spouse or partner present. About 29.7% of all households were made up of individuals and 15.1% had someone living alone who was 65 years of age or older.

There were 20,807 housing units, of which 19.2% were vacant. Among occupied housing units, 76.0% were owner-occupied and 24.0% were renter-occupied. The homeowner vacancy rate was 1.4% and the rental vacancy rate was 7.1%.

Huntingdon County, Pennsylvania – Racial and ethnic composition Note: the US Census treats Hispanic/Latino as an ethnic category. This table excludes Latinos from the racial categories and assigns them to a separate category. Hispanics/Latinos may be of any race.
Race / Ethnicity (NH = Non-Hispanic)	Pop 2000	Pop 2010	Pop 2020	% 2000	% 2010	% 2020
White alone (NH)	42,305	42,197	39,420	92.80%	91.90%	89.40%
Black or African American alone (NH)	2,334	2,369	2,267	5.11%	5.15%	5.14%
Native American or Alaska Native alone (NH)	44	36	49	0.09%	0.07%	0.11%
Asian alone (NH)	94	181	210	0.20%	0.39%	0.47%
Pacific Islander alone (NH)	0	0	9	0.00%	0.00%	0.02%
Other race alone (NH)	33	22	100	0.07%	0.04%	0.22%
Mixed race or Multiracial (NH)	252	381	1,185	0.55%	0.82%	2.68%
Hispanic or Latino (any race)	524	727	852	1.14%	1.58%	1.93%
Total	45,586	45,913	44,092	100.00%	100.00%	100.00%

=== 2010 census ===
As of the 2010 census, there were 45,913 people and 17,280 households within the county. The population density was 52 people per square mile (20 people/km^{2}). There were 22,365 housing units at an average density of 24 units per square mile (9.3/km^{2}). The racial makeup of the county was 92.50% White, 5.21% Black or African American, 0.09% Native American, 0.40% Asian, 0.01% Pacific Islander, 0.87% from other races, and 0.92% from two or more races. 1.58% of the population were Hispanic or Latino of any race. 33.9% were of German, 17.1% American, 11.1% Irish, 7.5% English and 5.7% Italian ancestry.

There were 16,759 households, out of which 30.10% had children under the age of 18 living with them, 58.10% were married couples living together, 8.30% had a female householder with no husband present, and 29.60% were non-families. 25.80% of all households were made up of individuals, and 12.30% had someone living alone who was 65 years of age or older. The average household size was 2.44 and the average family size was 2.92.

In the county, the population was spread out, with 21.70% under the age of 18, 10.10% from 18 to 24, 29.40% from 25 to 44, 24.00% from 45 to 64, and 14.80% who were 65 years of age or older. The median age was 38 years. For every 100 females there were 109.60 males. For every 100 females age 18 and over, there were 110.20 males.

Almost everyone that lives in Huntingdon County speaks English as their first language. The dominant form of speech in Huntingdon County is the Central Pennsylvania accent of English. In some areas of the county, such as Kishacoquillas Valley, where many Amish and Mennonite people live, a dialect of German known as Pennsylvania Dutch (from Deutsch, the word for German) is commonly spoken.

== Micropolitan Statistical Area ==
The United States Office of Management and Budget has designated Huntingdon County as the Huntingdon, PA Micropolitan Statistical Area (μSA). As of the 2010 census the micropolitan area ranked 11th most populous in the State of Pennsylvania and the 249th most populous in the United States with a population of 45,913.

== Law and government ==
United States presidential election results for Huntingdon County, Pennsylvania
Year	Republican		Democratic		Third party(ies)	
Year	No.	%	No.	%	No.	%
1888	4,217	58.56%	2,789	38.73%	195	2.71%
1892	3,994	57.66%	2,675	38.62%	258	3.72%
1896	4,969	66.06%	2,305	30.64%	248	3.30%
1900	4,645	67.91%	1,989	29.08%	206	3.01%
1904	4,587	73.11%	1,324	21.10%	363	5.79%
1908	4,503	66.34%	1,917	28.24%	368	5.42%
1912	903	14.33%	1,538	24.41%	3,859	61.25%
1916	3,806	60.23%	2,181	34.51%	332	5.25%
1920	5,232	67.74%	1,784	23.10%	708	9.17%
1924	6,567	73.99%	1,488	16.77%	820	9.24%
1928	9,920	86.25%	1,470	12.78%	112	0.97%
1932	7,371	66.39%	3,426	30.86%	306	2.76%
1936	9,815	56.43%	7,429	42.72%	148	0.85%
1940	9,141	61.64%	5,631	37.97%	58	0.39%
1944	8,106	65.80%	4,131	33.53%	83	0.67%
1948	6,943	67.76%	3,304	32.24%	0	0.00%
1952	9,580	68.61%	4,318	30.93%	64	0.46%
1956	9,698	67.66%	4,618	32.22%	17	0.12%
1960	11,116	70.07%	4,710	29.69%	38	0.24%
1964	6,571	46.81%	7,435	52.96%	33	0.24%
1968	8,276	61.82%	4,128	30.83%	984	7.35%
1972	9,606	72.68%	3,394	25.68%	216	1.63%
1976	7,843	58.26%	5,410	40.19%	209	1.55%
1980	8,140	58.44%	5,094	36.57%	694	4.98%
1984	10,220	69.57%	4,430	30.15%	41	0.28%
1988	8,800	64.56%	4,752	34.86%	79	0.58%
1992	7,249	46.17%	5,153	32.82%	3,298	21.01%
1996	7,324	50.53%	5,285	36.46%	1,886	13.01%
2000	10,408	65.21%	5,073	31.78%	480	3.01%
2004	12,126	67.15%	5,879	32.56%	53	0.29%
2008	11,745	62.70%	6,621	35.35%	365	1.95%
2012	11,979	67.71%	5,409	30.57%	304	1.72%
2016	14,494	72.96%	4,539	22.85%	833	4.19%
2020	17,061	74.69%	5,445	23.84%	337	1.48%
2024	17,627	75.96%	5,368	23.13%	211	0.91%

Pennsylvania Gubernatorial election results for Huntingdon County
Year	Republican		Democratic		Third party(ies)	
Year	No.	%	No.	%	No.	%
1970	6,036	53.37%	4,810	42.53%	463	4.09%
1974	6,338	58.23%	4,448	40.87%	98	0.90%
1978	6,781	61.29%	4,224	38.18%	59	0.53%
1982	7,287	60.74%	4,659	38.83%	52	0.43%
1986	6,348	55.56%	4,974	43.54%	103	0.90%
1990	3,490	34.40%	6,656	65.60%	0	0.00%
1994	6,530	51.81%	3,636	28.85%	2,437	19.34%
1998	6,253	65.25%	1,936	20.20%	1,394	14.55%
2002	7,842	66.13%	3,697	31.18%	319	2.69%
2006	8,103	59.61%	5,490	40.39%	0	0.00%
2010	9,764	72.90%	3,629	27.10%	0	0.00%
2014	7,247	56.85%	5,500	43.15%	0	0.00%
2018	10,586	66.57%	5,037	31.68%	278	1.75%
2022	12,579	68.19%	5,597	30.34%	272	1.47%

=== Voter registration ===
As of February 5, 2024, there are 27,430 registered voters in the county. There are 18,231 registered Republicans, 6,414 registered Democrats, 2,138 voters registered non-affiliated voters, and 647 voters registered to other parties.

Chart of Voter Registration
1. Republican (66.5%)
2. Democratic (23.4%)
3. Independent (7.80%)
4. Other Parties (2.36%)

=== County commissioners ===
- Scott Walls (chair) (R)
- Patrick Reeder (R)
- Jeffrey Thomas (D)

=== State Senate ===
- Judy Ward, Republican, Pennsylvania's 30th Senatorial District

=== State House of Representatives ===
- Scott Barger, Republican, Pennsylvania's 80th Representative District
- Rich Irvin, Republican, Pennsylvania's 81st Representative District

=== United States House of Representatives ===
- John Joyce, Republican, Pennsylvania's 13th congressional district

=== United States Senate ===
- John Fetterman, Democrat
- Dave McCormick, Republican

United States Senate election results for Huntingdon County, Pennsylvania1
Year	Republican		Democratic		Third party(ies)	
Year	No.	%	No.	%	No.	%
1994	7,065	57.08%	4,557	36.82%	755	6.10%
2000	11,185	71.42%	3,910	24.97%	565	3.61%
2006	7,279	53.55%	6,315	46.45%	0	0.00%
2012	11,285	64.34%	5,820	33.18%	434	2.47%
2018	10,491	65.94%	5,126	32.22%	294	1.85%
2024	16,910	72.02%	5,582	23.78%	986	4.20%

United States Senate election results for Huntingdon County, Pennsylvania3
Year	Republican		Democratic		Third party(ies)	
Year	No.	%	No.	%	No.	%
1992	8,181	53.01%	5,990	38.82%	1,261	8.17%
1998	6,752	71.77%	2,280	24.23%	376	4.00%
2004	11,630	65.33%	4,848	27.23%	1,325	7.44%
2010	9,134	68.38%	4,223	31.62%	0	0.00%
2016	13,078	66.76%	5,105	26.06%	1,406	7.18%
2022	13,035	71.37%	4,665	25.54%	564	3.09%

== Education ==
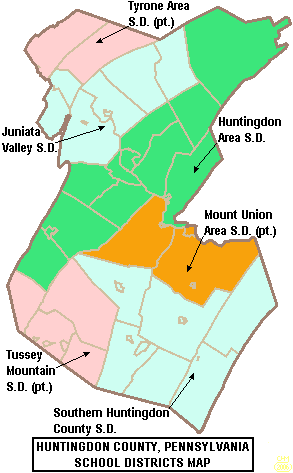
Map of Huntingdon County, Pennsylvania School Districts

=== Public school districts ===
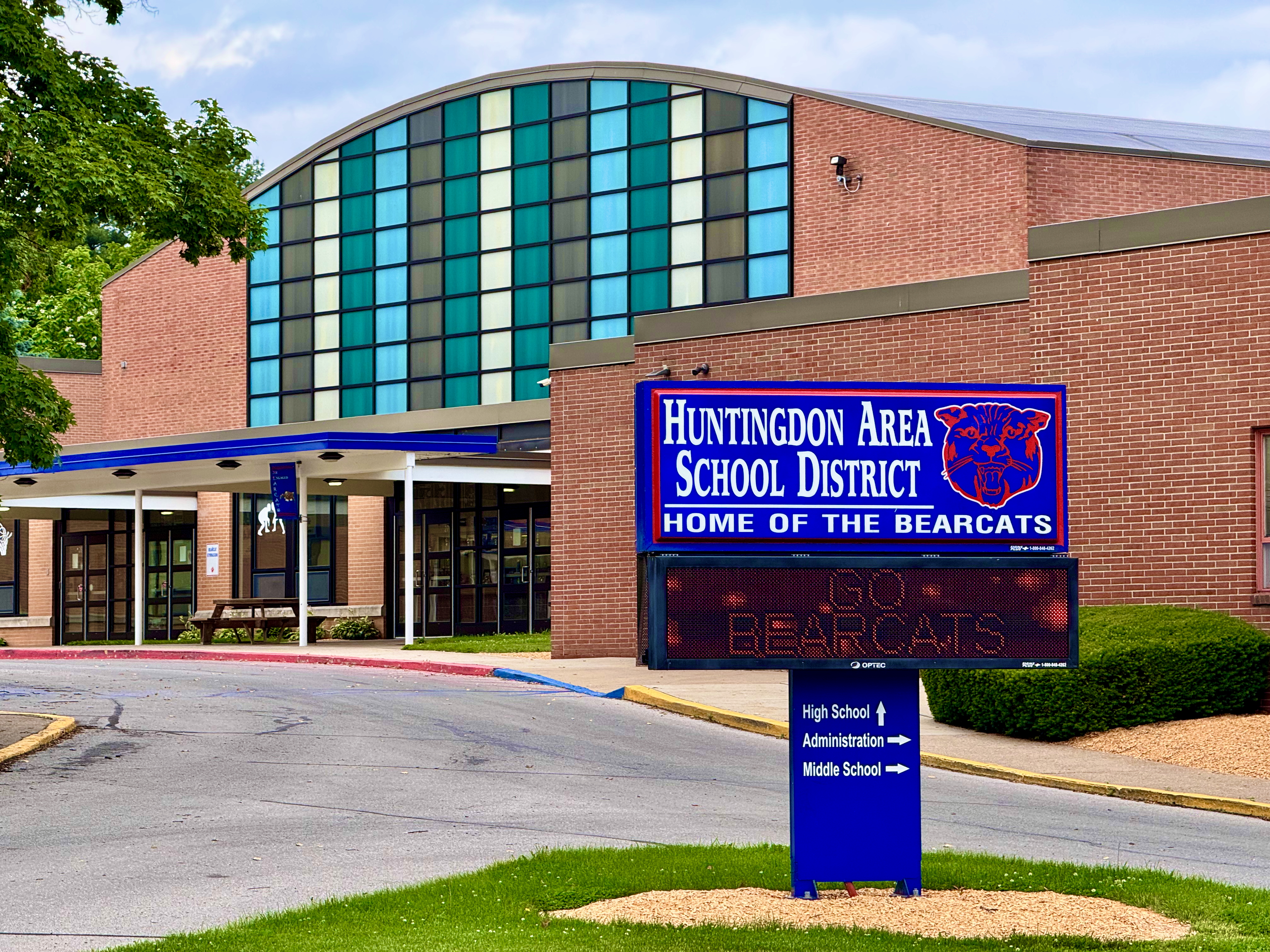
Huntingdon Area School District

- Huntingdon Area School District
- Juniata Valley School District
- Mount Union Area School District (also in Mifflin County)
- Southern Huntingdon County School District
- Tussey Mountain School District (also in Bedford County)
- Tyrone Area School District (also in Blair and Centre Counties)

==== Related entities ====
- Huntingdon County Career and Technology Center: Mill Creek
- Tuscarora Intermediate Unit 11

=== Charter schools ===
- New Day Charter School (7–12): Huntingdon
- Stone Valley Community Charter School (K–5): McAlevy's Fort

=== Private schools ===
- Calvary Christian Academy(: Huntingdon
- Class School: Mill Creek
- Grier School: Birmingham
- Huntingdon Christian Academy: Huntingdon
- Huntingdon County Child & Adult Development Center
- Meadow Green Mennonite School: Three Springs
- Shavers Creek Christian School: Petersburg
- West Penn F Grace Brethren: Saxton
- Woodcock Valley Center on Children: Huntingdon

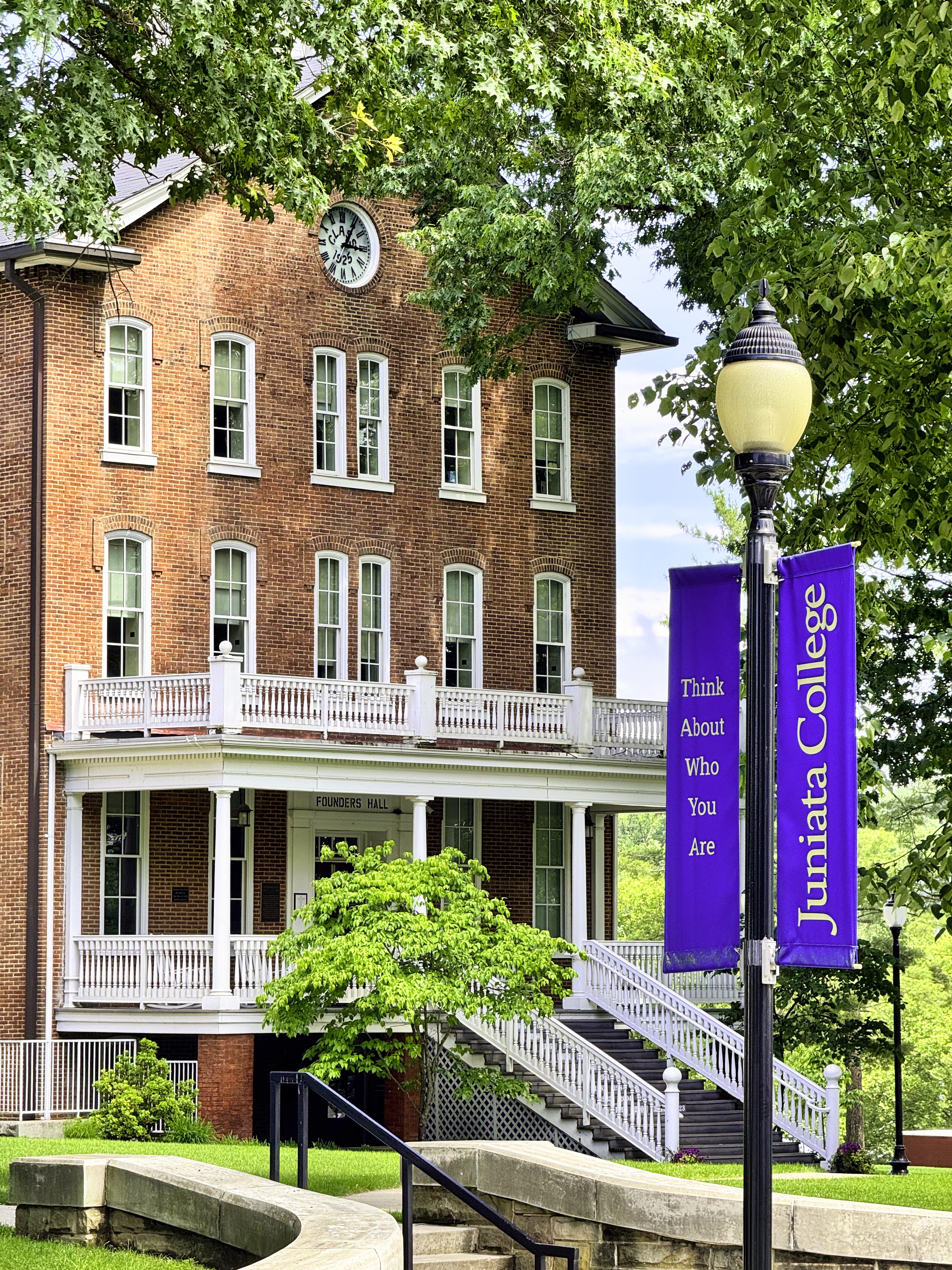
Founders Hall at Juniata College in Huntingdon

=== Colleges and universities ===
- Juniata College, a small, independent liberal arts college, is located in the county seat of Huntingdon.
- DuBois Business College, Huntingdon County campus, located in the former Huntingdon High School building in the borough of Huntingdon. (Currently Closed)
- Pennsylvania Highlands Community College, Huntingdon center (located in Walker Township)

=== Libraries ===
- Huntingdon County Library
- Memorial Public Library of the Borough of Alexandria
- Mount Union Community Library

== Transportation ==
=== Major highways ===
- I-76 / Penna Turnpike
- US 22
- US 522
- PA 26
- PA 26 Truck
- PA 35
- PA 45
- PA 103
- PA 305
- PA 350
- PA 453
- PA 475
- PA 550
- PA 641
- PA 655
- PA 747
- PA 829
- PA 913
- PA 994

== Media ==
=== Radio stations ===
==== AM ====
- ESPN RADIO 1150 AM: Huntingdon (Sports)
- WIEZ 670 AM: Lewistown (News/Talk)
- WMAJ 1450 AM: State College (Sports)
- WVAM 1430 AM: Altoona (Sports)
- WFBG 1290 AM: Altoona (News/Talk)
- WKMC 1370 AM: Roaring Spring (Nostalgia)
- WRTA 1240 AM: Altoona (News/Talk)
- WRSC 1390 AM: State College (News/Talk)
- WBLF 970 AM: Bellefonte (News/Talk)
- WPHB 1260 AM: Philipsburg (Country)
- WKVA 920 AM: Burnham (Oldies)
- WHP 580 AM: Harrisburg (News/Talk)
- KDKA 1020 AM: Pittsburgh (heard much better at night) (News/Talk)
- WWVA 1170 AM: Wheeling, West Virginia- (heard much better at night) (News/Talk/Country)
- WGY 810 AM: Schenectady, New York (heard much better at night) (News/Talk)

==== FM ====
- WHUN 103.5 FM: Huntingdon (Oldies)
- WDBF 106.3 FM: Selinsgrove (Country)
- WKVR 92.3 FM: Huntingdon (College)
- W273BE 102.5 FM: Huntingdon (Public Radio)
- WFGY 98.1 FM: Altoona (Country)
- WFGE 101.1 FM: Tyrone (Country)
- WBUS 93.7 FM: State College (Classic Rock)
- WWOT 100.1 FM: Altoona (Top 40)
- WJOW 105.9 FM: Philipsburg (Country)
- WSKE 104.3 FM: Everett (Country)
- WJSM 92.7 FM: Martinsburg (Religious)
- WHPA 93.5 FM: Gallitzin (Oldies)
- WBRX 94.7 FM: Cresson (Adult Contemporary)
- WRXV 89.1 FM: State College (Christian Contemporary)
- WTLR 89.9 FM: State College (Religious)
- WRKY 104.9 FM: Hollidaysburg (Classic Rock)
- WRKW 99.1 FM: Ebensburg (Classic Rock)
- WFGI 95.5 FM: Johnstown (Country)
- WVNW 96.7 FM: Burnham (Country)
- WCHX 105.5 FM: Burnham (Classic Rock)
- WQWK 103.1 FM: State College (Classic Rock)
- WLTS 99.5 FM: Centre Hall (Classic Hits)
- WPSU 91.5 FM: State College (Public Radio)

=== Newspapers ===
- The Daily News

=== Television ===
- CBS: WTAJ-TV, Altoona
- ABC: WATM-TV, Johnstown
- Fox: WWCP-TV, Johnstown
- NBC: WJAC-TV, Johnstown
- PBS: WPSU-TV, State College
- CW: WPKD-TV, Jeannette

== Communities ==
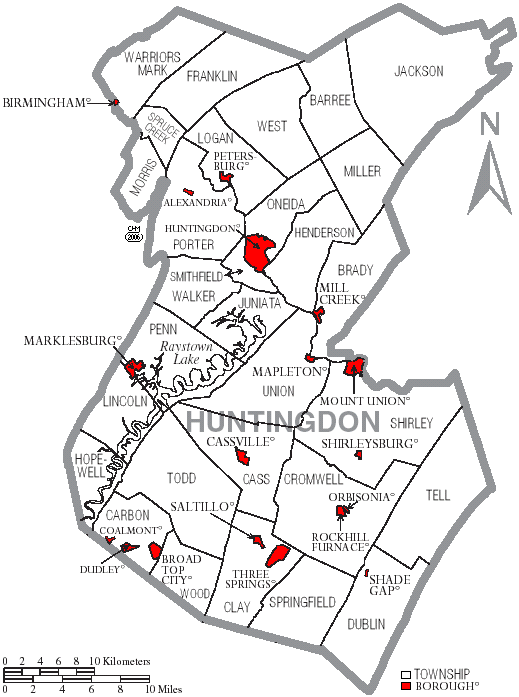
Map of Huntingdon County, Pennsylvania with Municipal Labels showing Boroughs (red) and Townships (white).

Under Pennsylvania law, there are four types of incorporated municipalities: cities, boroughs, townships, and one town. The following boroughs and townships are located in Huntingdon County:

=== Boroughs ===
- Alexandria
- Birmingham
- Broad Top City
- Cassville
- Coalmont
- Dudley
- Huntingdon (county seat)
- Mapleton
- Marklesburg
- Mill Creek
- Mount Union
- Orbisonia
- Petersburg
- Rockhill
- Saltillo
- Shade Gap
- Shirleysburg
- Three Springs

=== Townships ===
- Barree
- Brady
- Carbon
- Cass
- Clay
- Cromwell
- Dublin
- Franklin
- Henderson
- Hopewell
- Jackson
- Juniata
- Lincoln
- Logan
- Miller
- Morris
- Oneida
- Penn
- Porter
- Shirley
- Smithfield
- Springfield
- Spruce Creek
- Tell
- Todd
- Union
- Walker
- Warriors Mark
- West
- Wood

=== Census-designated places ===
- Allenport
- McConnellstown

=== Unincorporated communities ===
- Calvin
- Entriken
- Nossville

=== Population ranking ===
The population ranking of the following table is based on the 2010 census of Huntingdon County.

† county seat

Rank	City/Town/etc.	Municipal type	Population (2010 Census)
1	† Huntingdon	Borough	7,093
2	Mount Union	Borough	2,447
3	McConnellstown	CDP	1,194
4	Allenport	CDP	648
5	Petersburg	Borough	480
6	Broad Top City	Borough	452
7	Three Springs	Borough	444
8	Mapleton	Borough	441
9	Orbisonia	Borough	428
10	Rockhill	Borough	371
T-11	Alexandria	Borough	346
T-11	Saltillo	Borough	346
12	Mill Creek	Borough	328
13	Marklesburg	Borough	204
14	Dudley	Borough	184
15	Shirleysburg	Borough	150
16	Cassville	Borough	143
17	Coalmont	Borough	106
18	Shade Gap	Borough	105
19	Birmingham	Borough	90

== Notable people ==
- Scott Beatty (born 1969 in Huntingdon, raised in Petersburg), author and comic book writer
- Hugh Brady (born July 29, 1768, in Standingstone), U.S. Army general
- Martin Grove Brumbaugh (1862–1930), 26th Governor of Pennsylvania
- Dylan Lane (born 1977), game show host (hosted Chain Reaction) (born in Tyrone, Blair County, spent whole life in Huntingdon)
- Isabel Stewart North (1860-1929), composer
- Horace Porter (1837–1921), Civil War general and US diplomat
- John Purdue (born October 31, 1802, in Huntingdon County), primary original benefactor of Purdue University
- Richard Murray Simpson (1900–1960), US congressman, born in Huntingdon County
- Elizabeth Cisney Smith (1881–1965), physician
- Robert Elliott Speer (1867–1947), American religious leader

== See also ==
- National Register of Historic Places listings in Huntingdon County, Pennsylvania
