= Mount Union, Pennsylvania =

Borough in Pennsylvania, US

- Borough
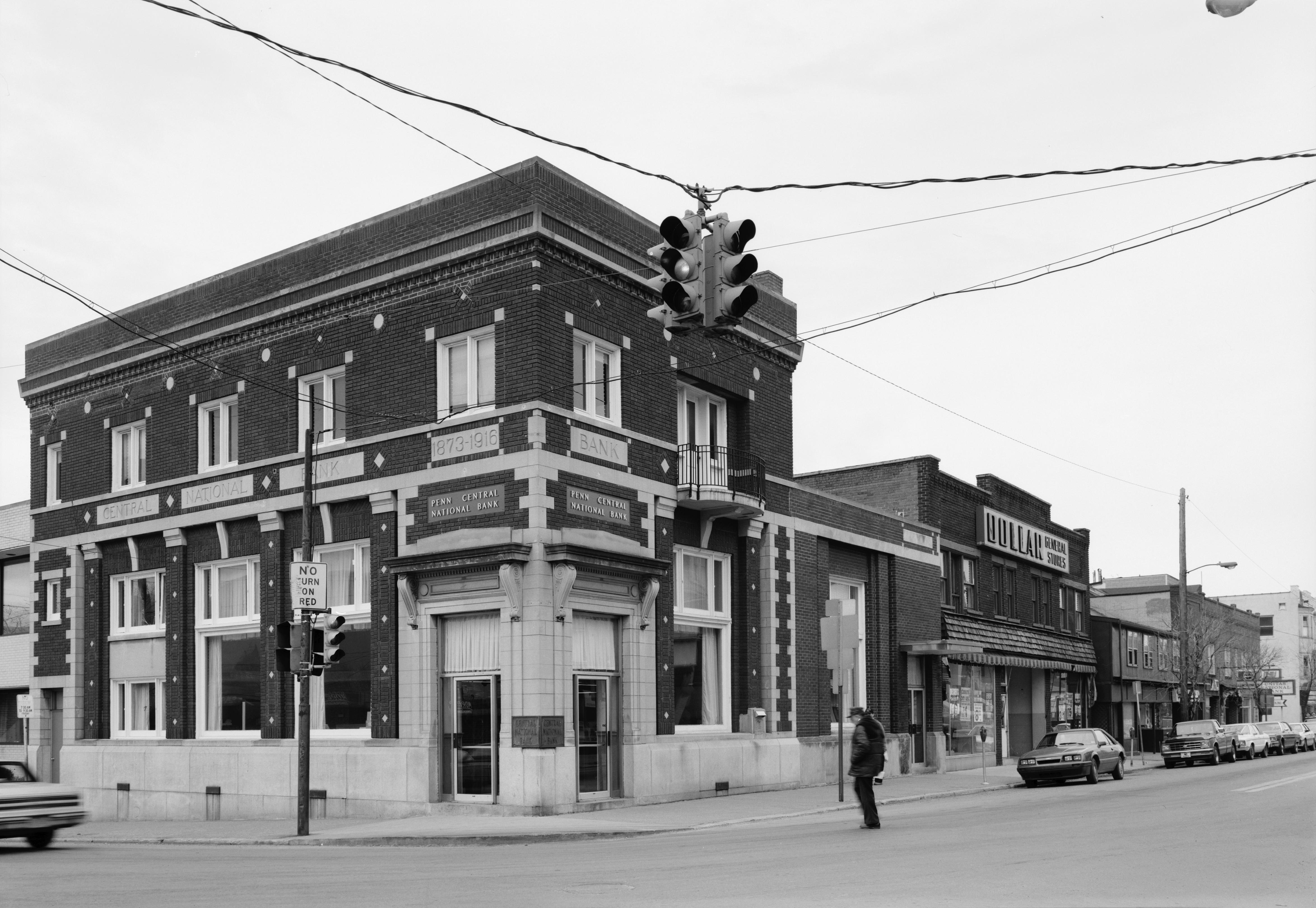
- Shirley and Jefferson Streets, downtown, in 1990
- Nickname: Bricktown USA
- Location of Mount Union in Huntingdon County, Pennsylvania.

- Location within Pennsylvania Location within the United States
- Coordinates: 40°23′06″N 77°52′42″W
- Country: United States
- State: Pennsylvania
- County: Huntingdon
- Settled: 1849
- Incorporated: 1867

Government
  - Type: Borough Council
  - Mayor: Tim Allison

Area
  - Total: 1.24 sq mi (3.20 km^{2})
  - Land: 1.16 sq mi (3.00 km^{2})
  - Water: 0.077 sq mi (0.20 km^{2}) 2.59%
- Elevation: 610 ft (190 m)

Population (2020)
  - Total: 2,308
  - Density: 1,990.7/sq mi (768.62/km^{2})
- Time zone: UTC-5 (Eastern (EST))
  - Summer (DST): UTC-4 (EDT)
- Zip code: 17066
- Area code: 814
- FIPS code: 42-51984
- GNIS feature ID: 1215274
- Website: https://www.mountunionpa.net/

Mount Union is a borough in Huntingdon County, Pennsylvania, United States, approximately 44 miles (71 km) southeast of Altoona and 12 miles (19 km) southeast of Huntingdon, on the Juniata River. In the vicinity are found bituminous coal, ganister rock, fire clay, and some timber. A major Easter grass factory is located in the northern quadrant of the borough limits; until May 2007, the facility was owned by Bleyer Industries. As of the 2020 census, Mount Union had a population of 2,308.

== History ==
Mount Union was largely influenced by industry. It was at one time the world's largest producer of refractory material (silica brick), with three plants – General Refractories, United States Refractories, and Harbison Walker. The refractory business in Mount Union lasted from 1899 to about 1972, with limited production into the early 1990s. Other industries included two tanneries, a tanning extract plant, coal yards, an explosives and munitions plant (Aetna), and foundry and machine shops.

Mount Union was the northern terminus for the narrow gauge East Broad Top Railroad, connecting to the Main Line of the Middle Division of the Pennsylvania Railroad (now Norfolk Southern). The EBT maintained a large dual-gauge yard and coal cleaning plant in Mount Union and supplied coal to the Refractory plants. The EBT ceased operations in 1956 but the track is still in place and owned by the railroad. From 1998 to 2010, the Mount Union Connecting Railroad attempted to reactivate the EBT main track through Mount Union and rehabilitated it, but only a couple of cars were serviced and none moved over the EBT trackage.

The Mount Union Historic District was listed on the National Register of Historic Places in 1994, with 300 significant historic structures, buildings, and homes. The population in 1900 was 1,086 and tripled to 3,338 in 1910.

== Today ==
The culturally significant Thousand Steps of the Standing Stone Trail are located in the Jacks Narrows, approximately two miles west of the town along U.S. Route 22. The annual Creation Festival was hosted locally (in Shirleysburg) from 1984 to 2022, drawing thousands of visitors in late June. Mount Union is the site of the Pennsylvania Lions Beacon Lodge Camp, a summer camp for people with visual impairments and special needs, founded by Carl Shoemaker in 1948. Today, Mount Union has 3 subsidized housing developments, Hartman Village, Chestnut Terrace, and Taylor Apartments, the later of which is a 7-story building for senior-citizens. The industries in Mount Unions include Bleyer Industries which produces plastic products, Containment Solutions which makes large tanks for gas stations, and Bonney Forge which manufactures steel valves and fittings. Bleyer Industries is located in the borough, southeast of the Industrial and Chestnut Street intersection, while Bonney Forge and Containment Solutions are located outside the borough, near or within the Riverview Business Center along US 522.

== Geography ==
According to the United States Census Bureau, the borough has a total area of 1.2 square miles (3.1 km^{2}), of which 1.1 square miles (2.8 km^{2}) is land and 0.04 square miles (0.10 km^{2}) (2.59%) is water.

== Education ==
=== Vocational/Technical education ===
- Huntingdon County Career and Technology Center – shared with the three other school districts

=== Public education ===
- Mount Union Area School District
  - Mount Union Area Senior High School
  - Mount Union Area Junior High School
  - Shirley Township Elementary School
  - Kister Elementary School

== Public services ==
=== Emergency services ===
The Mount Union Borough has its own police department providing law enforcement services to the borough with around a dozen officers. Mount Union Volunteer Fire Department provides fire, rescue and ambulance services to the borough and to Shirley Township and surrounding communities. The fire department has two ambulances: a 2014 Ford and a 2023 Ford. These units provide IALS (Intermediate Advance Life Support) and BLS (Basic Life Support); the status of the rigs rotates on a day to day basis. They also operate a 2015 Pierce Squad and a 2003 Pierce Engine – both refurbished in 2026 – a 2009 Rosenbauer 109ft straight truck, 2007 Ford Brush Truck and a 2009 Ford Special Unit also refurbished in 2026.

=== Health care ===
Mount Union Area Medical Center which provides preventive health services to the community. The closest hospitals are Penn Highlands Huntingdon, formerly JC Blair Hospital, in Huntingdon and Geisinger Lewistown Hospital in Lewistown.

=== Other ===
- Mount Union Post Office
- Mount Union Community Library

== Non-profit organizations ==
- Kiwanis Club of the Mount Union Area
- Allenport Lions Club
- Mount Union Area Food Pantry

== Demographics ==
Historical population
Census	Pop.	Note	%±
1870	535		—
1880	764		42.8%
1890	810		6.0%
1900	1,086		34.1%
1910	3,338		207.4%
1920	4,744		42.1%
1930	4,892		3.1%
1940	4,763		−2.6%
1950	4,690		−1.5%
1960	4,091		−12.8%
1970	3,662		−10.5%
1980	3,101		−15.3%
1990	2,878		−7.2%
2000	2,504		−13.0%
2010	2,447		−2.3%
2020	2,308		−5.7%

As of the census of 2000, there were 2,504 people, 1,166 households, and 684 families residing in the borough. The population density was 2,221.6 inhabitants per square mile (857.8/km^{2}). There were 1,288 housing units at an average density of 1,142.8 per square mile (441.2/km^{2}). The racial makeup of the borough was 86.50% White, 11.02% African American, 0.04% Native American, 0.32% from other races, and 2.12% from two or more races. Hispanic or Latino of any race were 1.20% of the population.

There were 1,166 households, out of which 29.3% had children under the age of 18 living with them, 37.3% were married couples living together, 18.1% had a female householder with no husband present, and 41.3% were non-families. 37.7% of all households were made up of individuals, and 18.5% had someone living alone who was 65 years of age or older. The average household size was 2.15 and the average family size was 2.83.

In the borough the population was spread out, with 25.6% under the age of 18, 8.0% from 18 to 24, 24.6% from 25 to 44, 23.2% from 45 to 64, and 18.5% who were 65 years of age or older. The median age was 38 years. For every 100 females there were 81.4 males. For every 100 females age 18 and over, there were 75.7 males.

The median income for a household in the borough was $21,048, and the median income for a family was $30,582. Males had a median income of $28,464 versus $21,719 for females. The per capita income for the borough was $13,419. About 25.5% of families and 28.6% of the population were below the poverty line, including 50.0% of those under age 18 and 17.9% of those age 65 or over.
