= Sugar Grove Run =

Stream in Pennsylvania, U.S.

Coordinates: 40.4386864°N 77.9377781°W

Sugar Grove Run is a stream in the U.S. state of Pennsylvania.

Sugar Grove Run was named from a grove of sugar trees near its course.
