= Coffee Run =

Stream in Pennsylvania

Coordinates: 40°19′01″N 78°10′22″W

Coffee Run is a stream in the U.S. state of Pennsylvania.

Coffee Run was named from an accident when a group of surveyors spilled their coffee into the stream.
