= Brady Township, Huntingdon County, Pennsylvania =

Township in Pennsylvania, US

Coordinates: 40°29′00″N 77°51′59″W

- Township
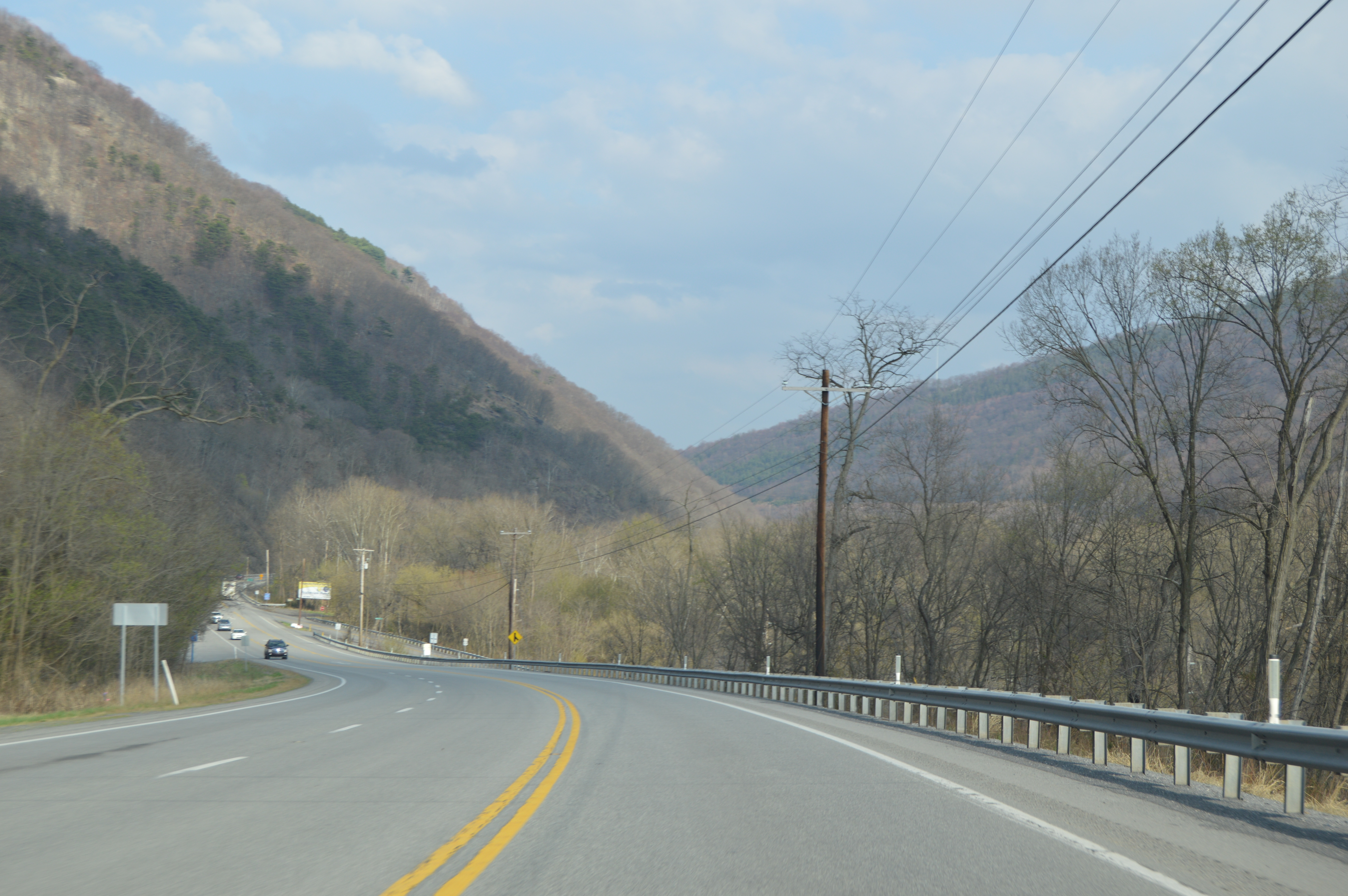
- Along U.S. Route 22 in Jacks Narrows, where the Juniata River pierces Jacks Mountain

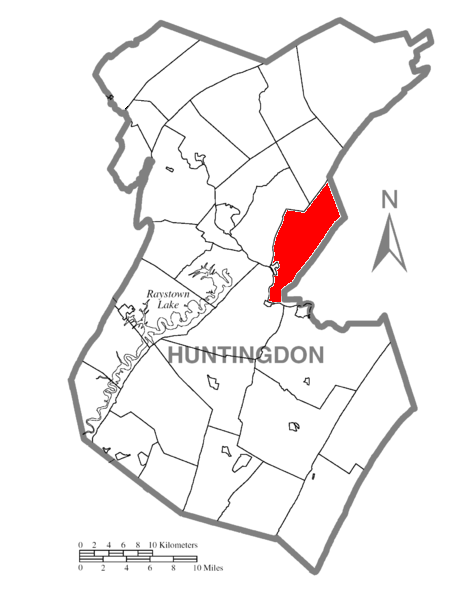
- Map of Huntingdon County, Pennsylvania Highlighting Brady Township

- Map of Huntingdon County, Pennsylvania
- Country: United States
- State: Pennsylvania
- County: Huntingdon

Area
  - Total: 31.37 sq mi (81.24 km^{2})
  - Land: 31.20 sq mi (80.82 km^{2})
  - Water: 0.16 sq mi (0.42 km^{2})

Population (2020)
  - Total: 1,033 ▼
  - Density: 33.1/sq mi (12.79/km^{2})
- Time zone: UTC-5 (Eastern (EST))
  - Summer (DST): UTC-4 (EDT)
- Zip code: 17052, 17060, 17066
- Area codes: 717, 814
- FIPS code: 42-061-08128
- Local phone exchanges: 483, 542, 543, 641, 643, 644

Brady Township is a township in Huntingdon County, Pennsylvania, United States. The population was 1,172 at the 2010 census. The township includes the villages of Fousetown and Airydale. Brady Township was named for Hugh Brady, a brigadier general in the United States Army who was born in Huntingdon, Pennsylvania. Township had been separated from Henderson in 1846.

== Geography ==
According to the United States Census Bureau, the township has a total area of 31.6 square miles (82 km^{2}), of which 31.4 square miles (81 km^{2}) is land and 0.2 square miles (0.52 km^{2}) (0.47%) is water.

== Demographics ==
Historical population
Census	Pop.	Note	%±
1990	1,053		—
2000	1,024		−2.8%
2010	1,181		15.3%
2020	1,033		−12.5%
2022 (est.)	1,014		−1.8%
U.S. Decennial Census

As of the census of 2000, there were 1,035 people, 376 households, and 291 families residing in the township. The population density was 32.9 inhabitants per square mile (12.7/km^{2}). There were 440 housing units at an average density of 14.0/sq mi (5.4/km^{2}). The racial makeup of the township was 98.74% White, 0.10% African American, 0.10% Native American, 0.10% from other races, and 0.97% from two or more races. Hispanic or Latino of any race were 0.68% of the population.

There were 376 households, out of which 35.4% had children under the age of 18 living with them, 69.4% were married couples living together, 4.0% had a female householder with no husband present, and 22.6% were non-families. 20.5% of all households were made up of individuals, and 12.5% had someone living alone who was 65 years of age or older. The average household size was 2.75 and the average family size was 3.17.

In the township the population was spread out, with 28.3% under the age of 18, 9.4% from 18 to 24, 25.1% from 25 to 44, 26.6% from 45 to 64, and 10.6% who were 65 years of age or older. The median age was 35 years. For every 100 females there were 99.0 males. For every 100 females age 18 and over, there were 94.8 males.

The median income for a household in the township was $28,750, and the median income for a family was $33,438. Males had a median income of $29,231 versus $26,250 for females. The per capita income for the township was $13,292. About 14.8% of families and 17.1% of the population were below the poverty line, including 22.7% of those under age 18 and 16.2% of those age 65 or over.

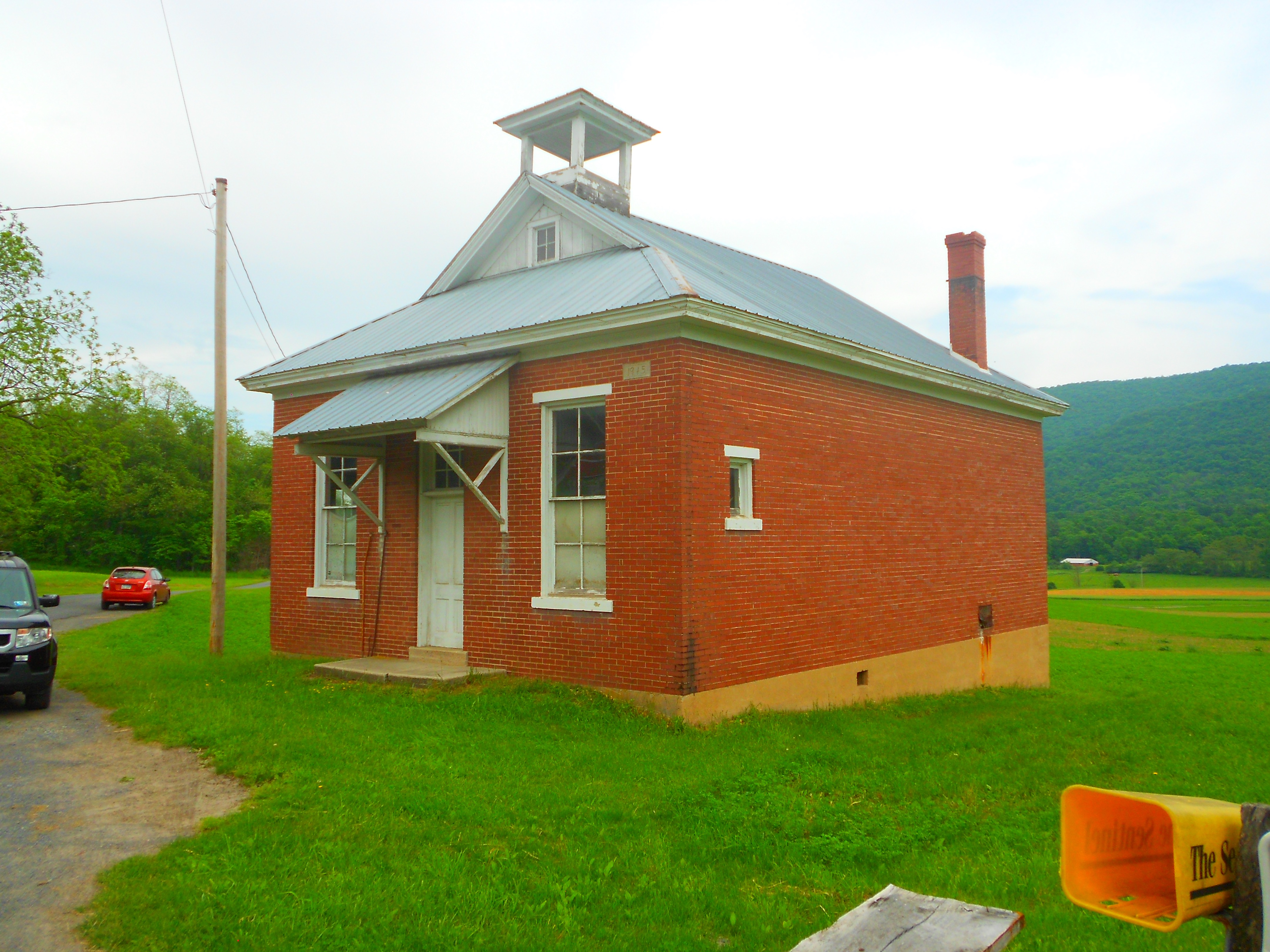
One room schoolhouse on Brown Road
