= Mill Creek, Pennsylvania =

Borough in Pennsylvania, US

- Borough
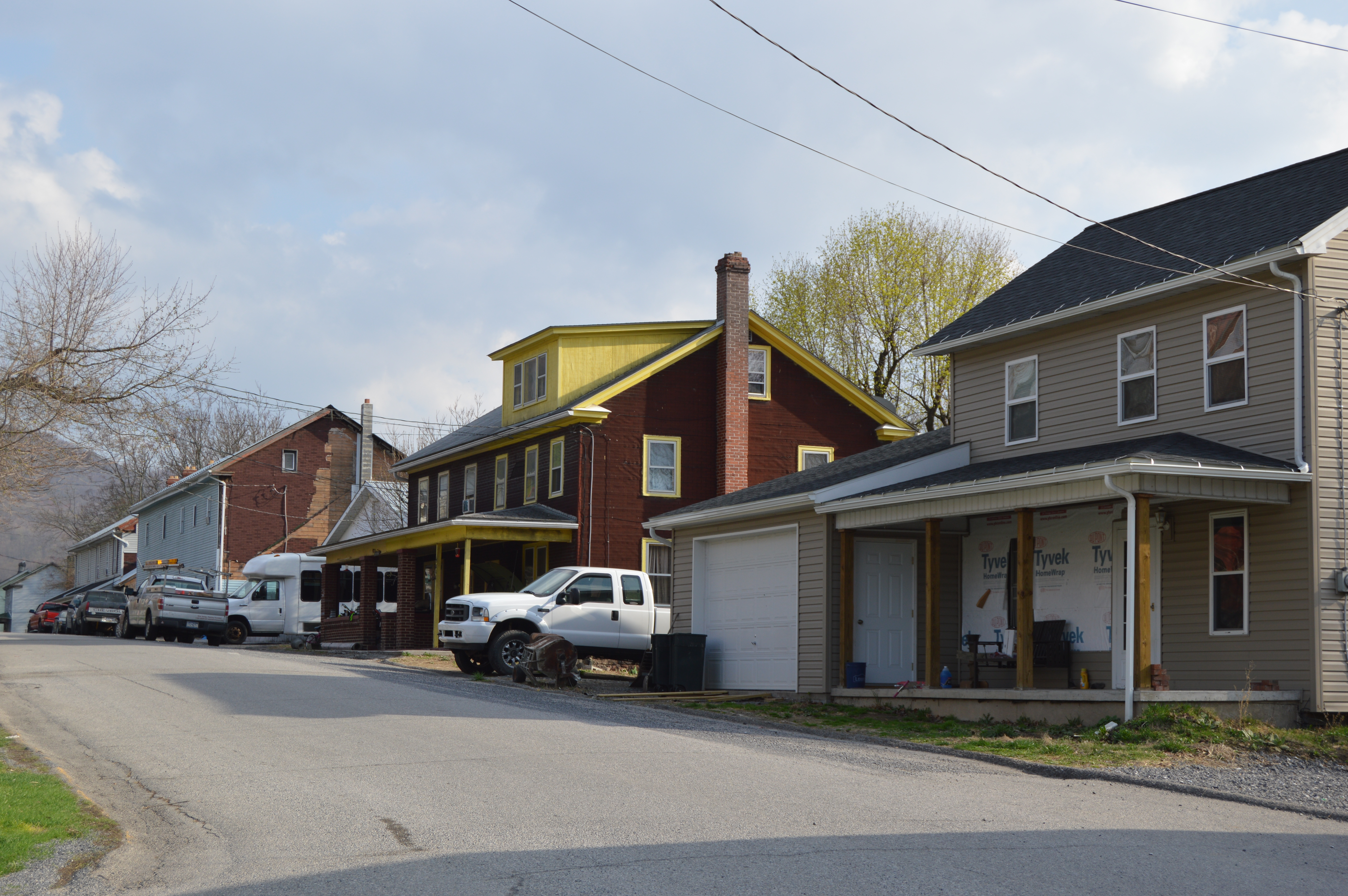
- Main Street

- Location of Mill Creek in Huntingdon County, Pennsylvania.

- Location within Pennsylvania Location within the United States
- Coordinates: 40°26′14″N 77°55′51″W
- Country: United States
- State: Pennsylvania
- County: Huntingdon
- Settled: 1848
- Incorporated: 1905

Government
  - Type: Borough Council
  - Mayor: Donovan A. Goss (R)

Area
  - Total: 0.32 sq mi (0.84 km^{2})
  - Land: 0.30 sq mi (0.78 km^{2})
  - Water: 0.023 sq mi (0.06 km^{2})
- Elevation: 643 ft (196 m)

Population (2020)
  - Total: 285
  - Density: 946.0/sq mi (365.27/km^{2})
- Time zone: UTC-5 (Eastern (EST))
  - Summer (DST): UTC-4 (EDT)
- ZIP code: 17060
- Area code: 814
- FIPS code: 42-49552
- GNIS feature ID: 1215273
- Local phone exchanges: 641, 643, 644

Mill Creek is a borough in Huntingdon County, Pennsylvania, United States. As of the 2020 census, Mill Creek had a population of 285.

== History ==
The borough of Mill Creek was named for Mill Creek, a tributary of the Juniata River, on which it is located. The creek was the main source of power for many of the mills in the settlement years of the 1700s, as well as during much of the nineteenth century.

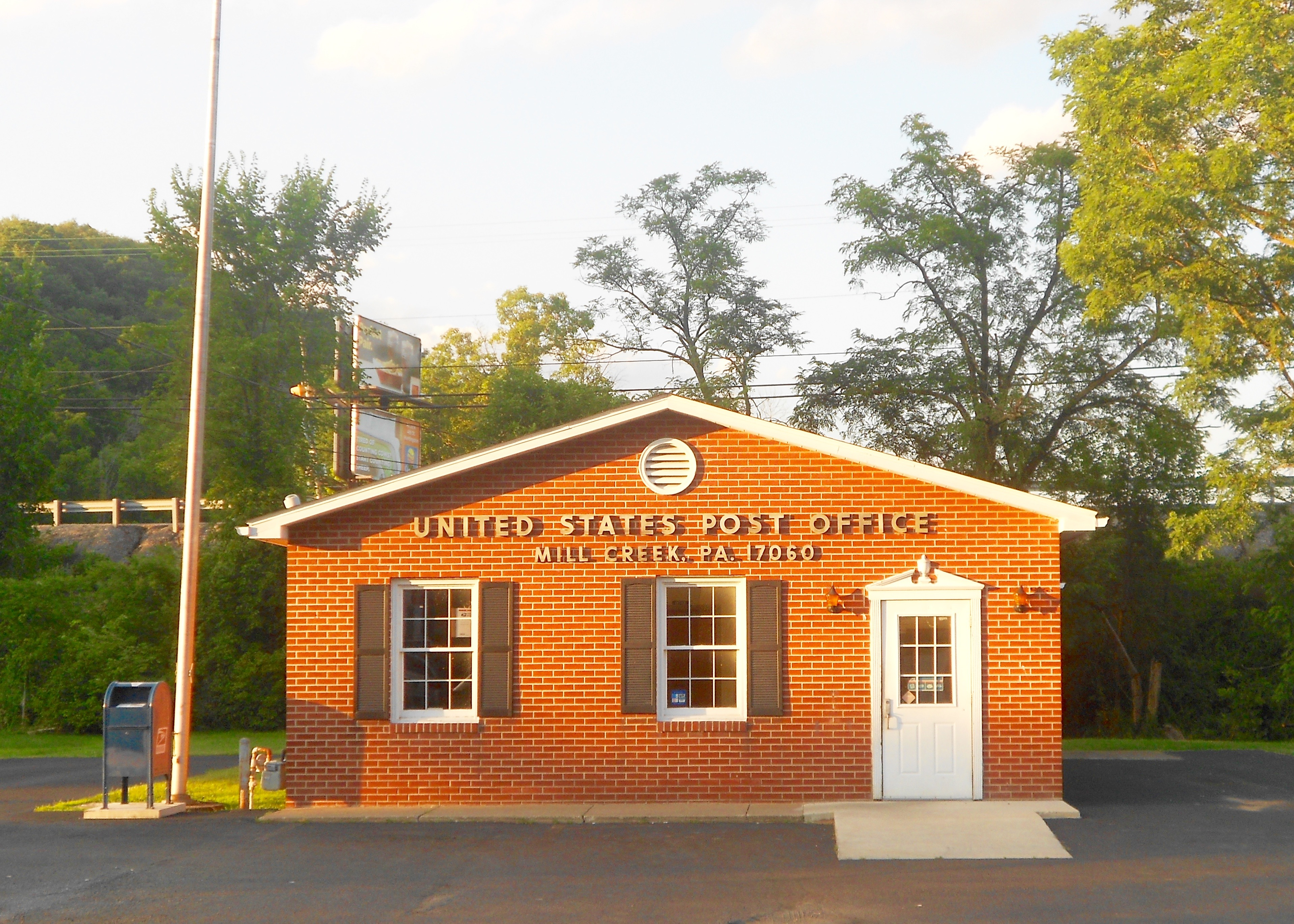
Post office

== Geography ==
The borough of Mill Creek is located in east-central Huntingdon County on the northeastern side of the Juniata River where it is joined by Mill Creek. U.S. Route 22 passes through the borough, leading northwestward 5 miles (8 km) to Huntingdon, the county seat, and southeastward 6 miles (10 km) to Mount Union. Pennsylvania Route 655 (Big Valley Pike) leads northeastward from Mill Creek 16 miles (26 km) to Belleville in the Kishacoquillas Valley.

Mill Creek borough is bordered to the northwest by Henderson Township, to the southwest (across the Juniata) by Union Township, and to the east by Brady Township. All three of the neighboring townships are in Huntingdon County.

According to the United States Census Bureau, the borough has a total area of 0.32 square miles (0.84 km^{2}), of which 0.30 square miles (0.78 km^{2}) are land and 0.02 square miles (0.06 km^{2}), or 7.65%, are water.

== Demographics ==
Historical population
Census	Pop.	Note	%±
1880	288		—
1910	308		—
1920	286		−7.1%
1930	334		16.8%
1940	362		8.4%
1950	417		15.2%
1960	400		−4.1%
1970	421		5.3%
1980	367		−12.8%
1990	392		6.8%
2000	351		−10.5%
2010	328		−6.6%
2020	285		−13.1%

As of the census of 2000, there were 351 people, 126 households, and 98 families residing in the borough. The population density was 945.6 inhabitants per square mile (365.1/km^{2}). There were 139 housing units at an average density of 374.5 per square mile (144.6/km^{2}). The racial makeup of the borough was 99.15% White, 0.28% African American, and 0.57% from two or more races.

There were 126 households, out of which 38.1% had children under the age of 18 living with them, 61.1% were married couples living together, 11.9% had a female householder with no husband present, and 22.2% were non-families. 17.5% of all households were made up of individuals, and 11.9% had someone living alone who was 65 years of age or older. The average household size was 2.79 and the average family size was 3.09.

In the borough the population was spread out, with 30.2% under the age of 18, 6.8% from 18 to 24, 27.9% from 25 to 44, 19.1% from 45 to 64, and 16.0% who were 65 years of age or older. The median age was 32 years. For every 100 females there were 96.1 males. For every 100 females age 18 and over, there were 91.4 males.

The median income for a household in the borough was $28,571, and the median income for a family was $30,833. Males had a median income of $26,250 versus $18,750 for females. The per capita income for the borough was $11,177. About 17.7% of families and 19.7% of the population were below the poverty line, including 32.4% of those under age 18 and 3.4% of those age 65 or over.

== Education ==
=== Vocational/technical education ===
- Huntingdon County Career and Technology Center (11893 Technology Drive)
- Huntingdon County Career and Technology Center: Annex Building (Practical Nursing Program; 13221 Big Valley Pike)

=== Public education ===
- Brady Henderson-Mill Creek Elementary School (closed 2012; formerly at 12045 Technology Drive)
