= Cromwell Township, Huntingdon County, Pennsylvania =

Township in Pennsylvania, US

Coordinates: 40°14′00″N 77°51′59″W

Cromwell Township, Pennsylvania
- Township
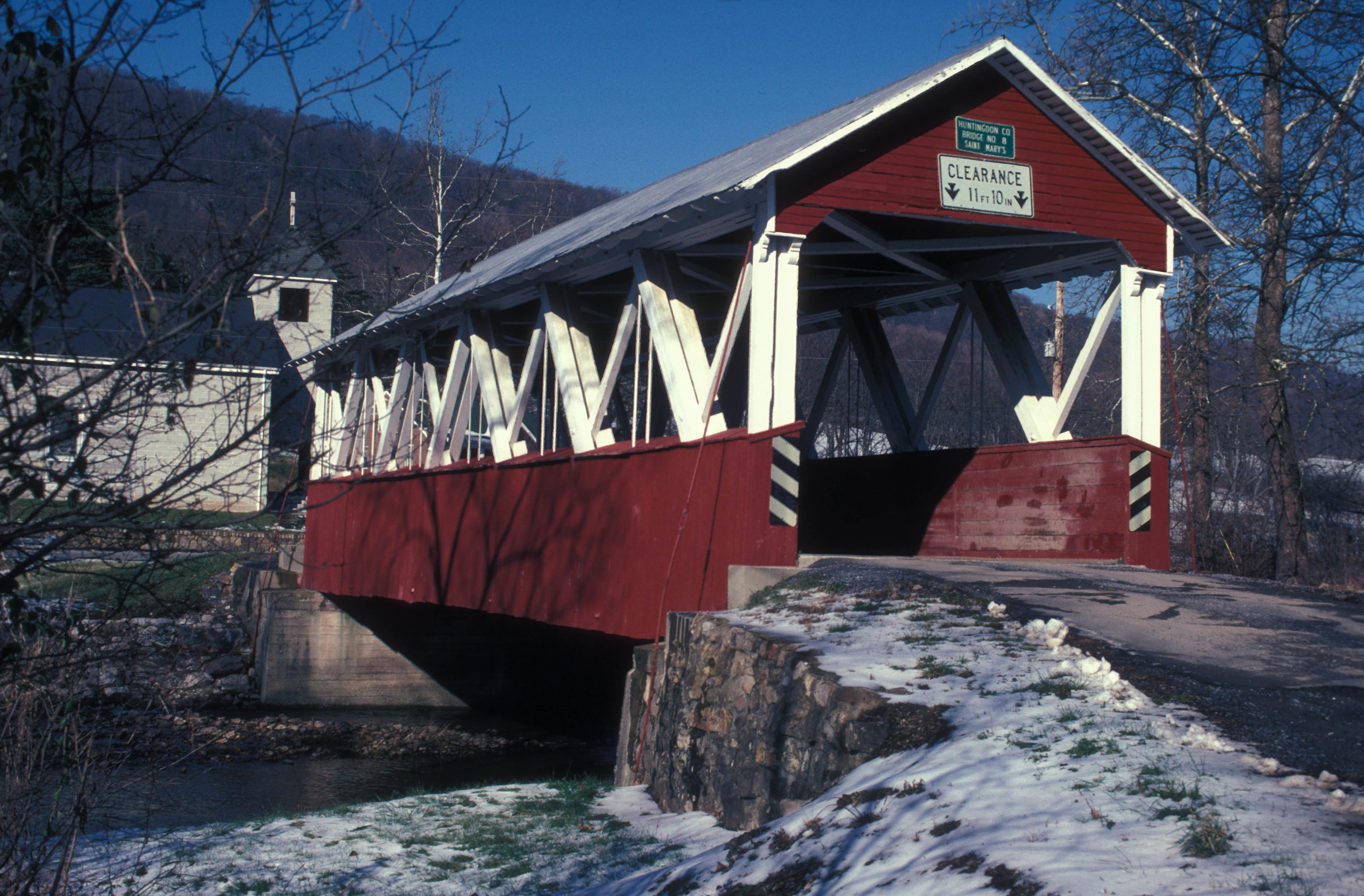
- St. Mary's Covered Bridge

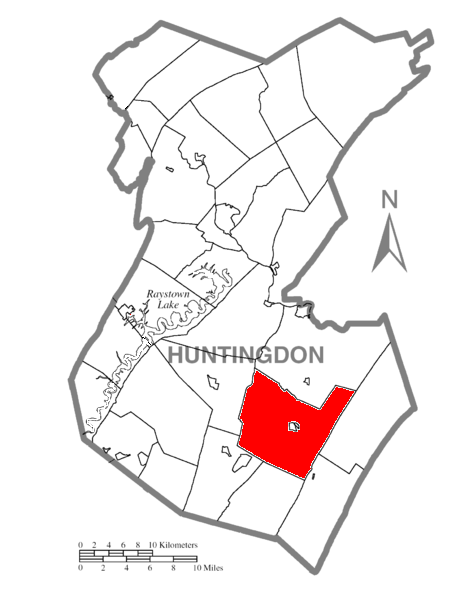
- Map of Huntingdon County, Pennsylvania Highlighting Cromwell Township

- Map of Huntingdon County, Pennsylvania
- Country: United States
- State: Pennsylvania
- County: Huntingdon

Area
  - Total: 50.85 sq mi (131.69 km^{2})
  - Land: 50.85 sq mi (131.69 km^{2})
  - Water: 0 sq mi (0.00 km^{2})

Population (2020)
  - Total: 1,475 ▼
  - Estimate (2022): 1,465
  - Density: 31.3/sq mi (12.09/km^{2})
- Time zone: UTC-5 (Eastern (EST))
  - Summer (DST): UTC-4 (EDT)
- FIPS code: 42-061-17280

Cromwell Township is a township in Huntingdon County, Pennsylvania, United States. The population was 1,475 at the 2020 census.

== History ==
The St. Mary's Covered Bridge was listed on the National Register of Historic Places in 1980.

== Geography ==
According to the United States Census Bureau, the township has a total area of 50.8 square miles (132 km^{2}), all land.

== Demographics ==
Historical population
Census	Pop.	Note	%±
2000	1,632		—
2010	1,510		−7.5%
2020	1,475		−2.3%
2022 (est.)	1,465		−0.7%
U.S. Decennial Census

At the 2000 census there were 1,632 people in 580 households, including 436 families, in the township. The population density was 32.1 inhabitants per square mile (12.4/km^{2}). There were 873 housing units at an average density of 17.2/sq mi (6.6/km^{2}). The racial makeup of the township was 99.14% White, 0.37% African American, 0.06% Native American, 0.06% Asian, and 0.37% from two or more races. There were 580 households, 34.0% had children under the age of 18 living with them, 65.2% were married couples living together, 5.5% had a female householder with no husband present, and 24.8% were non-families. 21.2% of households were made up of individuals, and 9.1% were one person aged 65 or older. The average household size was 2.57 and the average family size was 2.97.

The age distribution was 23.0% under the age of 18, 6.4% from 18 to 24, 27.0% from 25 to 44, 22.5% from 45 to 64, and 21.1% 65 or older. The median age was 40 years. For every 100 females there were 92.5 males. For every 100 females age 18 and over, there were 90.3 males.

The median household income was $36,629 and the median family income was $41,250. Males had a median income of $30,605 versus $18,125 for females. The per capita income for the township was $14,806. About 6.0% of families and 9.4% of the population were below the poverty line, including 11.0% of those under age 18 and 16.1% of those age 65 or over.
