= National Register of Historic Places listings in Huntingdon County, Pennsylvania =

Location of Huntingdon County in Pennsylvania

This is a list of the National Register of Historic Places listings in Huntingdon County, Pennsylvania.

This is intended to be a complete list of the properties and districts on the National Register of Historic Places in Huntingdon County, Pennsylvania, United States. The locations of National Register properties and districts for which the latitude and longitude coordinates are included below, may be seen in a map.

There are 42 properties and districts listed on the National Register in the county. Two sites are further designated as National Historic Landmarks.

This National Park Service list is complete through NPS recent listings posted May 1, 2026.

== Current listings ==
	Name on the Register	Image	Date listed	Location	Municipality	Description
1	H.O. Andrews Feed Mill	H.O. Andrews Feed Mill	March 20, 1990 (#90000399)	West Main Street; 40°23′42″N 77°56′35″W	Mapleton	
2	Baker Bridge	Baker Bridge	March 20, 1990 (#90000411)	Township Route 377 (Newburg Park Road) over Great Trough Creek, 1 mile (1.6 km) east of Newburg; 40°17′10″N 78°07′17″W	Todd Township	
3	Barree Forge and Furnace	Barree Forge and Furnace	March 20, 1990 (#90000405)	2 miles (3.2 km) north of Alexandria along the Juniata River; 40°35′18″N 78°06′04″W	Porter Township	
4	Birmingham Bridge	Birmingham Bridge	March 20, 1990 (#90000400)	Over the Juniata River, north of Birmingham off Pennsylvania Route 350; 40°38′56″N 78°11′57″W	Warriors Mark Township	Extends into Tyrone Township in Blair County
5	Brumbaugh Homestead	Brumbaugh Homestead	March 28, 1979 (#79002236)	Northeast of Marklesburg off Pennsylvania Route 26; 40°23′35″N 78°08′30″W	Penn Township	
6	Colerain Forges Mansion	Colerain Forges Mansion	March 20, 1990 (#90000406)	Pennsylvania Route 45, 0.75 miles (1.21 km) south of Franklinville; 40°38′20″N 78°06′00″W	Franklin Township	
7	Corbin Bridge	Corbin Bridge	March 20, 1990 (#90000402)	Township Road 428 over the Raystown Branch, southwest of Huntingdon and 0.5 miles (0.80 km) west of its confluence with the Juniata River; 40°27′16″N 77°59′00″W	Juniata Township	
8	East Broad Top Railroad	East Broad Top Railroad	October 15, 1966 (#66000666)	1 mile (1.6 km) west of Orbisonia on U.S. Route 522; 40°14′24″N 77°53′58″W	Numerous municipalities	Extends into Broad Top Township in Bedford County
9	Frehn Bridge	Frehn Bridge	March 20, 1990 (#90000391)	Township Route 313, 2 miles (3.2 km) west of Pennsylvania Route 475; 40°08′00″N 77°59′29″W	Springfield Township	The bridge has been demolished and replaced with a modern structure.
10	Greenwood Furnace	Greenwood Furnace	November 13, 1989 (#89001819)	Pennsylvania Route 305 in Greenwood Furnace State Park, east of McAlevys Fort; 40°38′48″N 77°46′41″W	Jackson Township	
11	Greenwood Lake Dam	Greenwood Lake Dam	May 11, 1987 (#87000050)	5 miles (8.0 km) north of Belleville off Pennsylvania Route 305; 40°38′55″N 77°45′32″W	Jackson Township	
12	Harbison-Walker Refractories Company	Harbison-Walker Refractories Company	March 20, 1990 (#90000392)	West Shirley Street; 40°23′10″N 77°53′23″W	Mount Union	
13	Hudson Grist Mill	Hudson Grist Mill	March 20, 1990 (#90000390)	Pennsylvania Route 829; 40°12′49″N 78°00′27″W	Saltillo	
14	Huntingdon Armory	Huntingdon Armory	December 22, 1989 (#89002075)	Standing Stone Avenue, east of central Huntingdon; 40°29′06″N 77°59′36″W	Huntingdon	
15	Huntingdon Borough Historic District	Huntingdon Borough Historic District	April 24, 1986 (#86000852)	Roughly bounded by Moore, Second, Allegheny, and Ninth Streets; 40°29′10″N 78°00′41″W	Huntingdon	
16	Huntingdon Furnace	Huntingdon Furnace	March 20, 1990 (#90000407)	Township Road 31106 northwest of Franklinville, 2 miles (3.2 km) northwest of its junction with Pennsylvania Route 45; 40°39′28″N 78°06′59″W	Franklin Township	
17	Juniata Iron Works	Juniata Iron Works	March 20, 1990 (#90000404)	Off Pennsylvania Route 885, 1.5 miles (2.4 km) east of Alexandria; 40°32′40″N 78°05′00″W	Porter Township	
18	Benjamin B. Leas House	Benjamin B. Leas House	February 23, 1984 (#84003401)	U.S. Route 522; 40°17′56″N 77°52′18″W	Shirleysburg	
19	Lloyd and Henry Warehouse	Lloyd and Henry Warehouse	March 20, 1990 (#90000397)	South 8th Street; 40°29′11″N 78°01′05″W	Huntingdon	
20	Marklesburg Historic District	Marklesburg Historic District	February 16, 1996 (#96000084)	Junction of Pennsylvania Route 26 and Legislative Route 3010; 40°22′57″N 78°10′22″W	Marklesburg	
21	Minersville Coke Ovens	Minersville Coke Ovens	March 20, 1990 (#90000401)	Pennsylvania Route 913, 1 mile (1.6 km) east of Coalmont; 40°13′00″N 78°11′03″W	Carbon Township	
22	Monroe Furnace	Monroe Furnace	November 13, 1989 (#89001818)	Junction of Pennsylvania Route 26 and Legislative Route 31076, 6 miles (9.7 km) northwest of McAlevys Fort; 40°41′43″N 77°53′41″W	Barree Township	Only ruins are visible. Best viewed in the winter.
23	Mount Union Historic District	Mount Union Historic District	May 26, 1994 (#94000516)	Roughly bounded by Water and Greene Streets, the I.O.O.F. Cemetery, and Washington and Lafayette Streets; 40°23′06″N 77°53′03″W	Mount Union	
24	Christian Oyer Jr. House		July 21, 1995 (#95000882)	Township Road 513, northeast of Huntingdon; 40°36′34″N 77°53′54″W	Barree Township	
25	Paradise Furnace	Paradise Furnace	March 20, 1990 (#90000403)	5 miles (8.0 km) southeast of Entriken in Trough Creek State Park; 40°18′39″N 78°07′34″W	Todd Township	
26	Pennsylvania Canal Guard Lock and Feeder Dam, Raystown Branch	Pennsylvania Canal Guard Lock and Feeder Dam, Raystown Branch	March 20, 1990 (#90000394)	2.5 miles (4.0 km) east of Huntingdon, south of U.S. Route 22 on the Juniata River; 40°26′59″N 77°58′09″W	Henderson Township	
27	Pennsylvania Furnace Mansion	Pennsylvania Furnace Mansion	March 20, 1990 (#90000409)	Off Pennsylvania Route 45 at Pennsylvania Furnace, south of the Centre County line 40°42′13″N 78°00′47″W	Franklin Township	
28	Pennsylvania Railroad Bridge over Shavers Creek	Pennsylvania Railroad Bridge over Shavers Creek	March 20, 1990 (#90000395)	Over Shavers Creek near its confluence with the Juniata River; 40°34′01″N 78°02′54″W	Logan Township and Petersburg	
29	Pennsylvania Railroad District	Pennsylvania Railroad District	March 20, 1990 (#90000393)	Conrail mile markers 213.73 to 218.88; 40°36′47″N 78°09′07″W	Spruce Creek Township	
30	Pennsylvania Railroad Old Bridge over Standing Stone Creek	Pennsylvania Railroad Old Bridge over Standing Stone Creek	March 20, 1990 (#90000410)	South of Penn Street over Standing Stone Creek; 40°28′51″N 78°00′17″W	Huntingdon	
31	Pulpit Rocks	Pulpit Rocks	November 4, 1993 (#93001614)	Old Huntingdon-Hollidaysburg Turnpike, northwest of Huntingdon; 40°31′01″N 78°02′49″W	Porter Township	
32	Robb Farm	Robb Farm	April 20, 2011 (#11000202)	11023 Hartslog Valley Road; 40°29′01″N 78°05′28″W	Walker Township	
33	Robertsdale Historic District	Robertsdale Historic District	May 7, 1992 (#92000391)	Roughly bounded by the USGS 1840 contour line and South Main, Wood, Lincoln, Cliff, and Cherry Streets, in Robertsdale; 40°11′01″N 78°06′45″W	Wood Township	
34	Runk Bridge	Runk Bridge	March 20, 1990 (#90000408)	Over Aughwick Creek, 1 mile (1.6 km) south of Shirleysburg off U.S. Route 522; 40°16′40″N 77°53′14″W	Shirley Township	
35	St. Mary's Covered Bridge	St. Mary's Covered Bridge	March 20, 1980 (#80003503)	4.5 miles (7.2 km) south of Orbisonia on U.S. Route 522; 40°12′21″N 77°52′42″W	Cromwell Township	
36	Hugh D. and Martha South Seeds Farm		March 12, 1999 (#99000328)	Legislative Route 31061, 1 mile (1.6 km) east of Pemberton; 40°37′45″N 78°09′06″W	Spruce Creek Township	
37	Shade Gap Feed and Flour Mill	Shade Gap Feed and Flour Mill	March 20, 1990 (#90000396)	U.S. Route 522, 1 mile (1.6 km) north of Shade Gap; 40°11′14″N 77°52′08″W	Dublin Township	
38	Lewis Smalley Homestead	Lewis Smalley Homestead	November 14, 1978 (#78003088)	East of Allenport on Pennsylvania Route 103; 40°21′40″N 77°49′52″W	Shirley Township	
39	Spruce Creek Rod and Gun Club	Spruce Creek Rod and Gun Club	February 28, 1991 (#91000228)	Pennsylvania Route 45, northeast of Franklinville (6501 Clubhouse Lane); 40°40′28″N 78°02′52″W	Franklin Township	
40	Warrior Ridge Dam and Hydroelectric Plant	Warrior Ridge Dam and Hydroelectric Plant	April 26, 1990 (#90000701)	2 miles (3.2 km) south of Petersburg, along the former Conrail main line 40°32′22″N 78°02′03″W	Logan and Porter Townships	
41	Whipple Dam State Park Day Use District	Whipple Dam State Park Day Use District	February 12, 1987 (#87000109)	10 miles (16 km) south of State College, east of Pennsylvania Route 26; 40°41′05″N 77°51′53″W	Jackson Township	
42	Woodvale Historic District	Woodvale Historic District	July 24, 1992 (#92000942)	Roughly bounded by Ash, High, North, Fulton, and Broad Streets in Woodvale; 40°10′01″N 78°08′17″W	Wood Township	Extends into Broad Top Township in Bedford County and Wells Township in Fulton County

== Former listing ==
	Name on the Register	Image	Date listed	Date removed	Location	City or town	Description
1	Mount Union Refractories Company	Mount Union Refractories Company	March 20, 1990 (#90000398)	September 13, 1996	Pennsylvania Ave. at Juniata River; 40°23′26″N 77°53′30″W	Mount Union	photo from 1991

== See also ==
- List of National Historic Landmarks in Pennsylvania
- National Register of Historic Places listings in Pennsylvania
- List of Pennsylvania state historical markers in Huntingdon County
