= Hugh D. and Martha South Seeds Farm =

Historic house in Pennsylvania, United States

- U.S. National Register of Historic Places
- Location within Pennsylvania Location within the United States
- Location: L.R. 31061, 1 mi. E. of Pemberton, Spruce Creek Township, Pennsylvania
- Coordinates: 40°37′45″N 78°09′06″W
- Area: 95.9 acres (38.8 ha)
- Built: c. 1830
- Architectural style: Georgian
- NRHP reference No.: 99000328
- Added to NRHP: March 12, 1999

Hugh D. and Martha South Seeds Farm, also known as Eden Hill Farm, is a historic home and farm located at Spruce Creek Township in Huntingdon County, Pennsylvania. The property includes a vernacular stone farmhouse dated to about 1830; a Pennsylvania bank barn dated to about 1880; and the surrounding landscape elements including farm lanes, fence rows, and field patterns. The farmhouse is a 2 1/2-story, five-bay, banked limestone dwelling with a full Georgian plan.

It was listed on the National Register of Historic Places in 1999.
