= Pennsylvania Railroad District =

Historic district in Pennsylvania, United States

- U.S. National Register of Historic Places
- U.S. Historic district
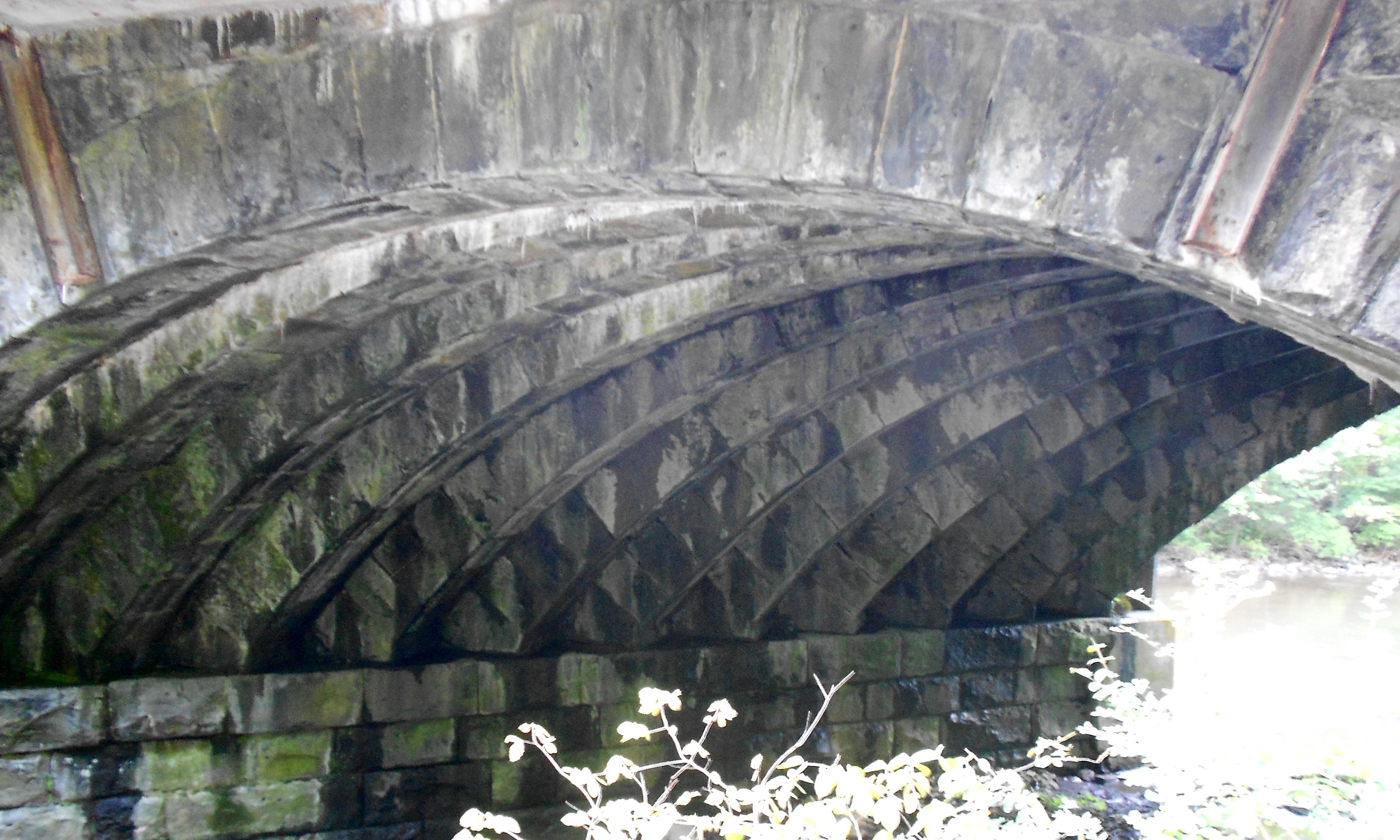
- Skew arch bridge just east of the village of Spruce Creek

- Location within Pennsylvania Location within the United States
- Location: Conrail mile markers 213.73 to 218.88, Spruce Creek Township, Pennsylvania, Morris Township, Pennsylvania, and Warriors Mark Township, Pennsylvania in Huntingdon County and Tyrone Township, Pennsylvania in Blair County
- Coordinates: 40°36′47″N 78°09′07″W
- Area: 50 acres (20 ha)
- Built: 1850-1902
- Built by: Pennsylvania Railroad
- MPS: Industrial Resources of Huntingdon County, 1780--1939 MPS
- NRHP reference No.: 90000393
- Added to NRHP: March 20, 1990

The Pennsylvania Railroad District, also known as Conrail: Little Juniata River Bridges and Tunnels or Bridges and Tunnels (Spruce Creek to Birmingham Section, Little Juniata River), is a national historic district that is located in Spruce Creek Township, Morris Township, and Warriors Mark Township in Huntingdon County, Pennsylvania and Tyrone Township in Blair County, Pennsylvania.

It was listed on the National Register of Historic Places in 1990.

== History and architectural features ==
This district consists of ten stone arch bridges, two parallel tunnels, and the right-of-way that links them. This 5.15-mile (8.29 km) section had the most bridges and tunnels per mile to carry the Pennsylvania Railroad right-of-way. The bridges were built between 1886 and 1902, and are multiple semi-circular arch bridges built of stone ashlar.

An original tunnel was built in 1850, and is a 1,151-foot (351 m) long brick arched tunnel. The parallel tunnel was built in 1900, and is a 1,075-foot (328 m) long brick-arched tunnel.
