= List of Pennsylvania state historical markers in Huntingdon County =

Location of Huntingdon County in Pennsylvania

This is a list of the Pennsylvania state historical markers in Huntingdon County.

This is intended to be a complete list of the official state historical markers placed in Huntingdon County, Pennsylvania by the Pennsylvania Historical and Museum Commission (PHMC). The locations of the historical markers, as well as the latitude and longitude coordinates as provided by the PHMC's database, are included below when available. There are 23 historical markers located in Huntingdon County.

== Historical markers ==
Marker title	Image	Date dedicated	Location	Marker type	Topics
Admiral Wm. Sims		April 23, 1995	Pa. 994 in Rockville, W of U.S. 522; 40.2382°N 77.90167°W	Roadside	Military, Military Post-Civil War
Bedford Furnace		April 28, 1947	US 522, at SE end of Orbisonia	Roadside	Business & Industry, Coal, Furnaces, Iron
Coleraine Forges		April 30, 1947	Pa. 45, 1.6 miles NE of Spruce Creek; 40.6272°N 78.11406°W	Roadside	Business & Industry, Coal, Iron
David R. Porter		October 15, 1955	3rd & Penn Sts., Huntingdon; 40.48378°N 78.00891°W	City	Government & Politics, Government & Politics 19th Century, Governors, Professions & Vocations
Fort Roberdeau		April 30, 1947	Pa. 453 & Truck Pa. 45 just S of Union Furnace (MISSING); 40.60975°N 78.16875°W	Roadside	American Revolution, Forts, Military
Fort Shirley		April 25, 1947	U.S. 522 at N end Shirleysburg; 40.30174°N 77.87404°W	Roadside	Forts, French & Indian War, Military
Fort Shirley - PLAQUE		May 1, 1926	US 522, Shirleysburg; 40.30131°N 77.87431°W	Plaque	Forts, French & Indian War, Military
Fort Standing Stone		October 15, 1955	Penn St., Huntingdon; 40.48162°N 78.00411°W	Roadside	American Revolution, Forts, Military, Native American
Frankstown Path		March 16, 1949	US 22 at Water Street, PA (town name); 40.57096°N 78.13425°W	Roadside	Paths & Trails, Transportation
Greenwood Furnace		April 30, 1947	Pa. 305 at Greenwood Furnace State Park; 40.64903°N 77.75705°W	Roadside	Business & Industry, Furnaces, Iron
Hart's Log		March 16, 1946	PA 305 at US22 junction, just S of Alexandria; 40.55737°N 78.0993°W	Roadside	Early Settlement, Paths & Trails, Professions & Vocations, Transportation
Huntingdon County		September 20, 1982	County Courthouse, Penn St., Huntingdon; 40.48364°N 78.00813°W	City	Government & Politics, Government & Politics 18th Century
Jack's Narrows		June 6, 1946	U.S. 22, 8.5 miles SE of Huntingdo (Missing)	Roadside	Environment
Juniata Iron		April 29, 1947	U.S. 522, 1 mile S of Orbisonia	Roadside	Business & Industry, Coal, Iron
Juniata Iron		April 29, 1947	U.S. 22 just E of Water Street; 40.57088°N 78.13396°W	Roadside	Business & Industry, Coal, Iron
Martin G. Brumbaugh		July 1, 1949	Pa. 26, 1.3 miles NE of Marklesburg; 40.39705°N 78.1488°W	Roadside	Education, Government & Politics, Government & Politics 20th Century, Governors
Martin G. Brumbaugh		July 23, 1948	US 22 & PA 26, W of Huntingdon; 40.49208°N 78.04007°W	Roadside	Education, Governors, Professions & Vocations
McAlevy's Fort		n/a	Junction Pa. 305 & Pa. 545 at McAlevy's Fort (Missing)	Roadside	American Revolution, Military
McMurtrie Mansion		October 15, 1955	4th & Penn. Huntingdon; 40.48447°N 78.01069°W	City	Buildings, Mansions & Manors
Pennsylvania Furnace		April 30, 1947	Spruce Creek Rd. (PA 45) at Pennsylvania Furnace Rd., PA Furnace; 40.70172°N 77.99935°W	Roadside	Business & Industry, Coal, Furnaces, Iron
Rural Electrification		July 5, 1992	10700 Fairgrounds Rd., Huntingdon; 40.5094°N 77.97878°W	Roadside	Business & Industry, Electricity
Shadow of Death		April 28, 1947	Croghan Pike (US 522) W of Shade Gap; 40.18869°N 77.87561°W	Roadside	Paths & Trails, Transportation
Spruce Creek Church		April 21, 1949	Spruce Creek Rd. (PA 45) at church, just NE of Graysville; 40.69087°N 78.288°W	Roadside	Religion

== See also ==
- List of Pennsylvania state historical markers
- National Register of Historic Places listings in Huntingdon County, Pennsylvania
