= Warrior Ridge Dam and Hydroelectric Plant =

Dam and power plant in Pennsylvania, US

- U.S. National Register of Historic Places
- U.S. Historic district
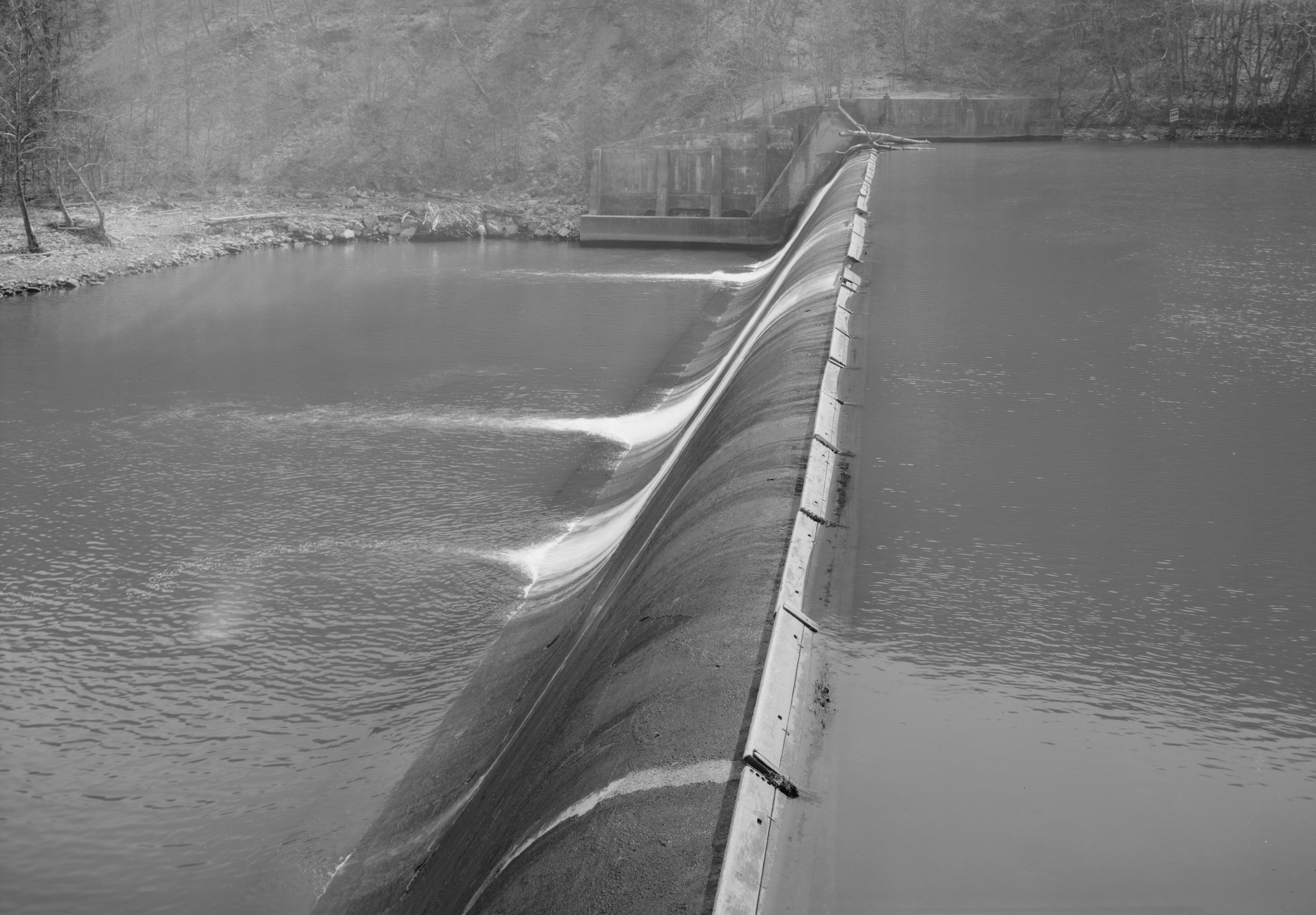
- Warrior Ridge Dam and Hydroelectric Plant, 1990

- Location within Pennsylvania Location within the United States
- Location: 2 miles (3.2 km) south of Petersburg, along the former Conrail main line, Logan Township, Pennsylvania and Porter Township, Pennsylvania
- Coordinates: 40°32′22″N 78°02′03″W
- Area: 8 acres (3.2 ha)
- Built: 1905
- Built by: Hydraulic Const. Co.
- Architect: Cushman, William H.; Ambursen, E.,
- MPS: Industrial Resources of Huntingdon County, 1780-1939 MPS
- NRHP reference No.: 90000701
- Added to NRHP: April 26, 1990

The Warrior Ridge Dam and Hydroelectric Plant is an historic dam and power plant and national historic district that spans the Frankstown Branch Juniata River and is located in Logan Township and Porter Township in Huntingdon County, Pennsylvania, United States.

It was listed on the National Register of Historic Places in 1990.

== History and notable features ==
This historic district includes five contributing buildings and three contributing structures. They are the main dam, power plant, auxiliary dam, and four houses and a former church in the operator's village. The main dam was built between 1905 and 1907 and is 400 feet (120 m) long and 27 feet (8.2 m) high, constructed of reinforced concrete. The auxiliary dam was built in 1907 and measures 110 feet (34 m) long and 27 feet high. The power plant was constructed between 1906 and 1907, and measured 30 by 205 feet (9.1 by 62.5 m), with a steam plant and two wings. The power plant was partially demolished in 1978. The houses and former church were built by plant developer, the Juniata Hydro-Electric Company of Philadelphia.
