= Shade Gap Feed and Flour Mill =

- U.S. National Register of Historic Places
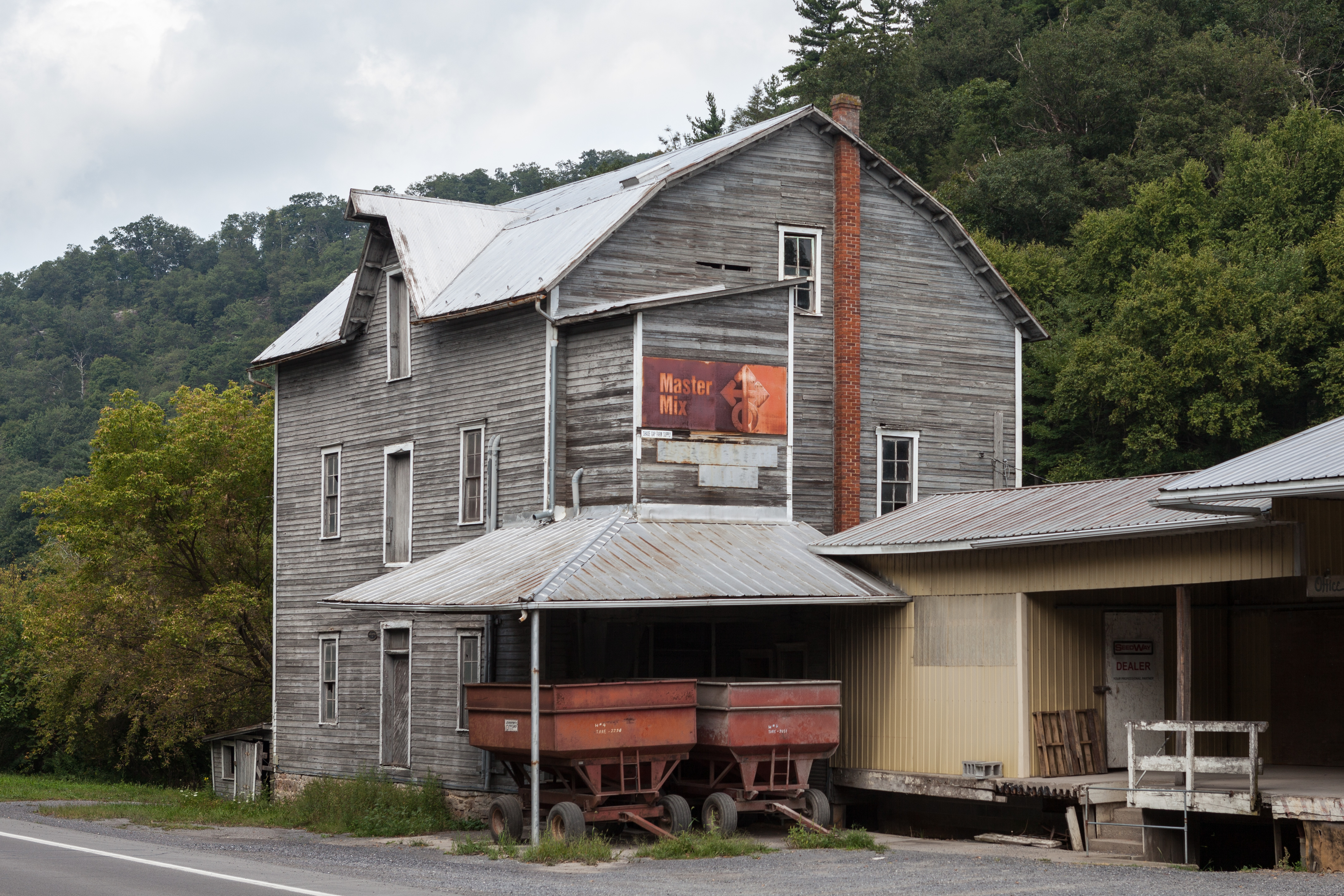
- South and east sides in September 2014

- Location within Pennsylvania Location within the United States
- Location: U.S. Route 522, 1 mile (1.6 km) north of Shade Gap, Dublin Township, Pennsylvania
- Coordinates: 40°11′14″N 77°52′8″W
- Area: 1 acre (0.40 ha)
- Built: 1846
- Architect: Blair, Brice X.
- MPS: The Industrial Resources of Huntingdon County, Pennsylvania, between 1780 and 1939
- NRHP reference No.: 90000396
- Added to NRHP: March 20, 1990

Shade Gap Feed and Flour Mill, also known as the C.J. Hess Mill, is an historic grist mill in Dublin Township in Huntingdon County, Pennsylvania, United States.

It was listed on the National Register of Historic Places in 1990.

== History and architectural features ==
Built in 1846, this historic structure is a three-story, frame building, measuring 40 by 30 feet (12.2 by 9.1 m), with a one-story frame office attached. It sits on a rubble stone foundation and has clapboard siding. The mill ceased operation between 1973 and 1974, but continues as a livestock feed mill.
