= Pulpit Rocks =

- U.S. National Register of Historic Places
- U.S. National Historic Landmark
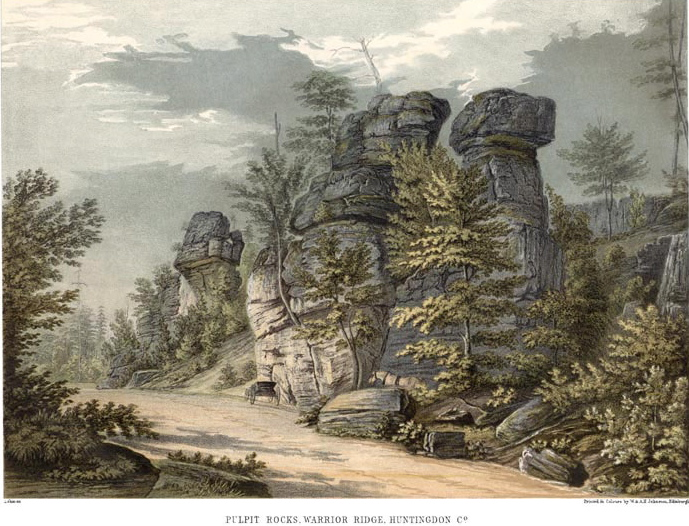
- as painted in 1858

- Location within Pennsylvania Location within the United States
- Location: Pike St. (Old US 22), northwest of Huntingdon, Pennsylvania
- Coordinates: 40°31′6.5″N 78°2′56.5″W
- Area: 4.5 acres (1.8 ha)
- NRHP reference No.: 93001614

Significant dates
- Added to NRHP: November 4, 1993
- Designated NHL: November 4, 1993

Pulpit Rocks is a geological formation adjacent to Pike Road, or Alexandria Pike Road, Old U.S. Route 22, northwest of Huntingdon in Huntingdon County, Pennsylvania. These weathered rock formations were instrumental in the determination of the stratigraphy of the Appalachian Mountains in the mid-19th century by the Pennsylvania Geological Survey. This work was influential in opening up new fields of geological research.

The site was declared a National Historic Landmark in 1993. It is partially owned by Juniata College, whose geology department uses the site for educational purposes. A plaque marks its location.

== Description and history ==
The Pulpit Rocks are located along Warrior Ridge, a formation located between Huntingdon and Alexandria in the Appalachian Mountains in central Pennsylvania. They are located on the north side of Pike Road, an old alignment of US 22, which now runs further south. The rock formations are essentially weathered pillars, about 50 feet (15 m) in height, that are isolated from one another by about 10 feet (3.0 m), spaces wide enough for a human to pass through. At the time research on this formation was first published in 1858, the accompanying watercolor painting (pictured here) was described as an accurate rendition of their state. The rocks are formed out of what is called Oriskany sandstone, and rest upon layers of limestone. The stone was laid down about 390 million years ago, when the area was covered by an inland sea, and have been eroding slowly ever since.

Pennsylvania's Geological Survey was established in 1836, with its survey work conducted between 1836 and 1842. The Huntingdon area was one of the first to be surveyed, and John Frazer, one of the geologists on the survey team, realized that the geology of this area strongly suggested that conventional wisdom about its structure was incorrect. The prevailing belief at the time was that there were single layers of sandstone and conglomerate underlying the ridges. In this area, in particular around the Pulpit Rocks, it was clear that there were in fact multiple layers of sandstone, separated from one another by thick layers of other types of rock. This realization immediately illuminated findings of surveys in neighboring New York and Virginia as to the structure of the mountain formations in those states. The Pennsylvania Geological Survey's first major report, published in 1858, featured the watercolor pictured here, highlighting the formation's importance in furthering the understanding of Appalachian (and more broadly all mountain) geology.

== See also ==
- List of National Historic Landmarks in Pennsylvania
- National Register of Historic Places listings in Huntingdon County, Pennsylvania
