= Marklesburg, Pennsylvania =

Borough in Pennsylvania, US

- Borough
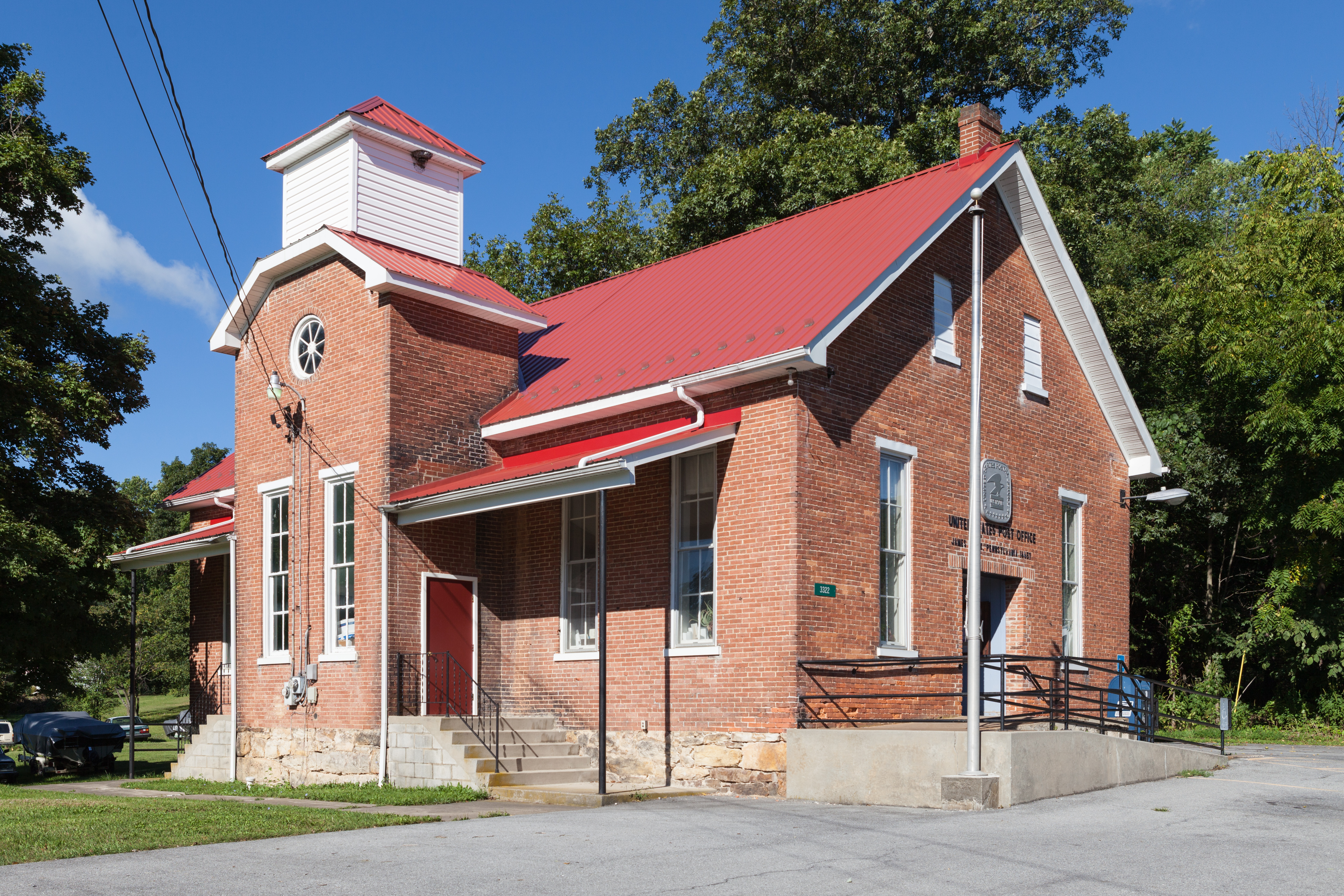
- The former James Creek School

- Location of Marklesburg in Huntingdon County, Pennsylvania.

- Location within Pennsylvania
- Coordinates: 40°22′35″N 78°10′11″W
- Country: United States
- State: Pennsylvania
- County: Huntingdon

Government
  - Type: Borough Council

Area
  - Total: 1.05 sq mi (2.72 km^{2})
  - Land: 1.03 sq mi (2.68 km^{2})
  - Water: 0.015 sq mi (0.04 km^{2})
- Elevation: 837 ft (255 m)

Population (2020)
  - Total: 200
  - Density: 193.1/sq mi (74.54/km^{2})
- Time zone: UTC-5 (Eastern (EST))
  - Summer (DST): UTC-4 (EDT)
- Zip code: 16657
- Area code: 814
- FIPS code: 42-47544
- GNIS feature ID: 1215272
- Website: https://marklesburgborough.com/
- Local phone exchanges: 658

Marklesburg is a borough in Huntingdon County, Pennsylvania, United States. As of the 2020 census, Marklesburg had a population of 200.

== History ==
The Marklesburg Historic District was listed on the National Register of Historic Places in 1996.

== Geography ==
Marklesburg is located near the western shore of Raystown Lake, just uphill from the flooded village of Aitch.

According to the United States Census Bureau, the borough has a total area of 0.9 square miles (2.3 km^{2}), all land.

=== Adjacent Municipalities ===
All municipalities listed are in Huntingdon County unless otherwise noted.

- Penn Township
- Lincoln Township

== Demographics ==
Historical population
Census	Pop.	Note	%±
1880	232		—
1890	279		20.3%
1900	260		−6.8%
1910	211		−18.8%
1920	198		−6.2%
1930	226		14.1%
1940	198		−12.4%
1950	219		10.6%
1960	197		−10.0%
1970	232		17.8%
1980	188		−19.0%
1990	165		−12.2%
2000	216		30.9%
2010	204		−5.6%
2020	200		−2.0%

At the 2000 census there were 216 people, 89 households, and 63 families residing in the borough. The population density was 243.5 inhabitants per square mile (94.0/km^{2}). There were 138 housing units at an average density of 155.6 per square mile (60.1/km^{2}). The racial makeup of the borough was 99.07% White, and 0.93% from two or more races. There were 89 households, 22.5% had children under the age of 18 living with them, 61.8% were married couples living together, 7.9% had a female householder with no husband present, and 28.1% were non-families. 25.8% of households were made up of individuals, and 13.5% were one person aged 65 or older. The average household size was 2.43 and the average family size was 2.92.

In the borough the population was spread out, with 18.5% under the age of 18, 10.2% from 18 to 24, 21.8% from 25 to 44, 28.7% from 45 to 64, and 20.8% 65 or older. The median age was 43 years. For every 100 females there were 89.5 males. For every 100 females age 18 and over, there were 89.2 males.

The median household income was $43,333 and the median family income was $46,500. Males had a median income of $38,333 versus $20,000 for females. The per capita income for the borough was $22,329. About 3.0% of families and 6.0% of the population were below the poverty line, including none of those under the age of eighteen or sixty five or over.
