= Monroe Furnace =

- U.S. National Register of Historic Places
- U.S. Historic district
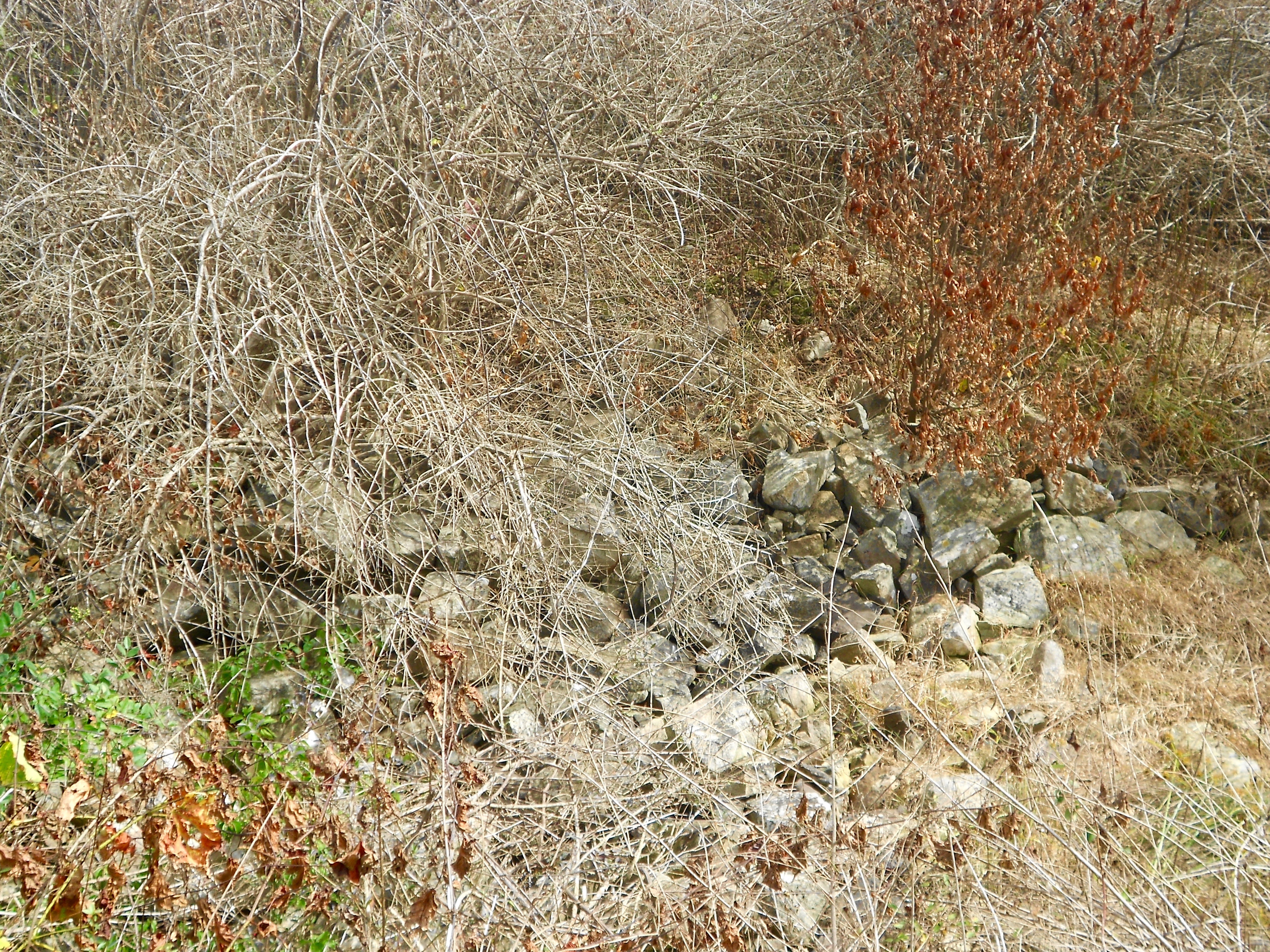
- Ruins of the foundations

- Location within Pennsylvania Location within the United States
- Location: Junction of Pennsylvania Route 26 and Legislative Route 31076, 6 miles (9.7 km) northwest of McAlevys Fort, Barree Township, Pennsylvania
- Coordinates: 40°41′45″N 77°53′37″W
- Area: 3 acres (1.2 ha)
- Built: 1847
- Architectural style: Iron plantation
- MPS: Industrial Resources of Huntingdon County, 1780--1939 MPS
- NRHP reference No.: 89001818
- Added to NRHP: November 13, 1989

The Monroe Furnace is a national historic district and historic iron furnace that are located in Barree Township in Huntingdon County, Pennsylvania.

It was listed on the National Register of Historic Places in 1989.

== History and architectural features ==
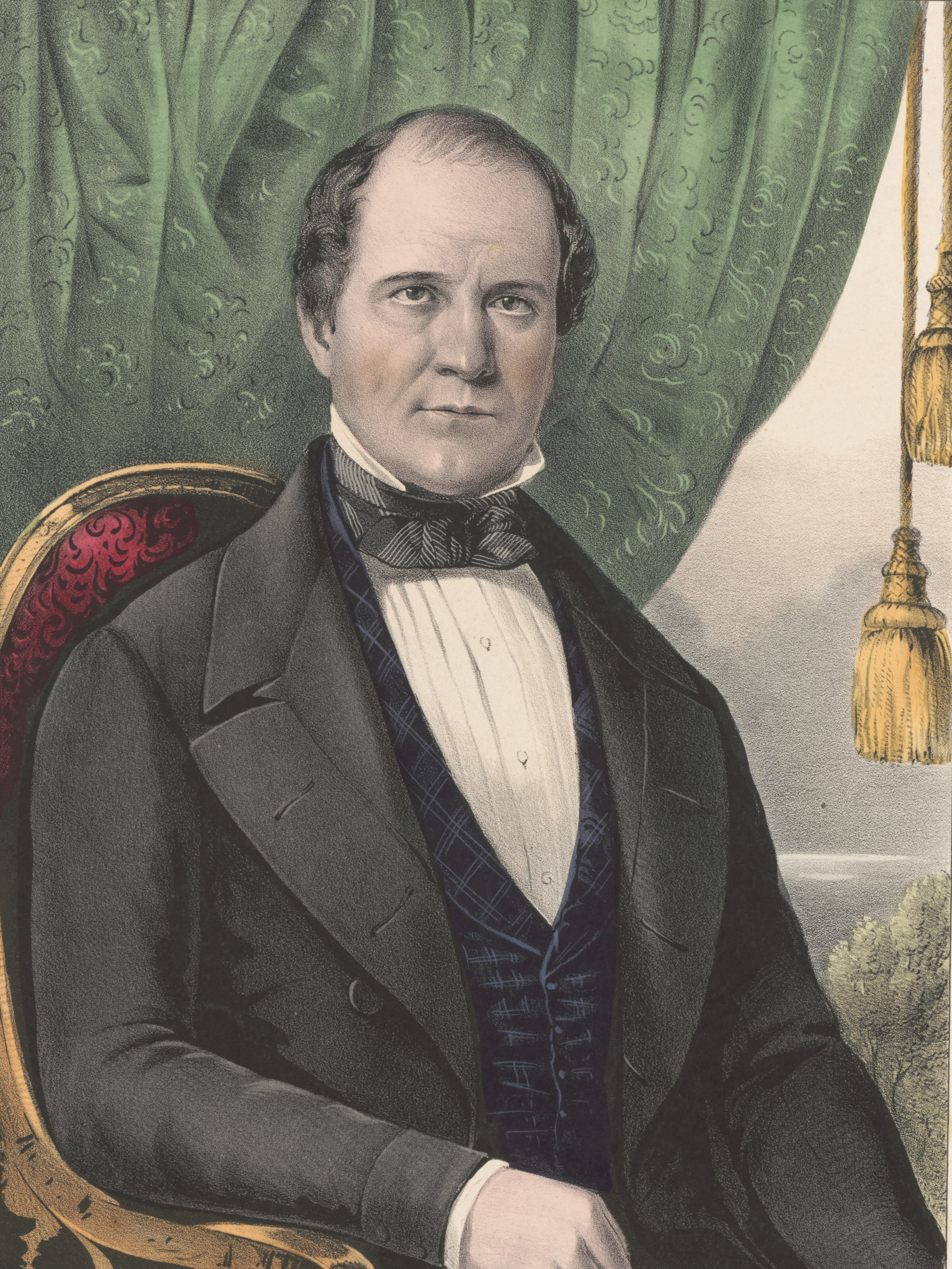
James Irwin, Founder of the Furnace

This district consists of one contributing site and one contributing structure. They are the remains of the furnace stack, its immediate surroundings, and the visible foundation remains of fourteen workers' houses. The furnace stack measures 30 square feet (2.8 m^{2}) at the base and stands 20 feet (6.1 m) tall. The furnace was established between 1846 and 1849 by General James Irvin It was in operation until 1863 and is included in the Pennsylvania State University Experimental Forest.

It was listed on the National Register of Historic Places in 1989.
