= Barree Forge and Furnace =

- U.S. National Register of Historic Places
- U.S. Historic district
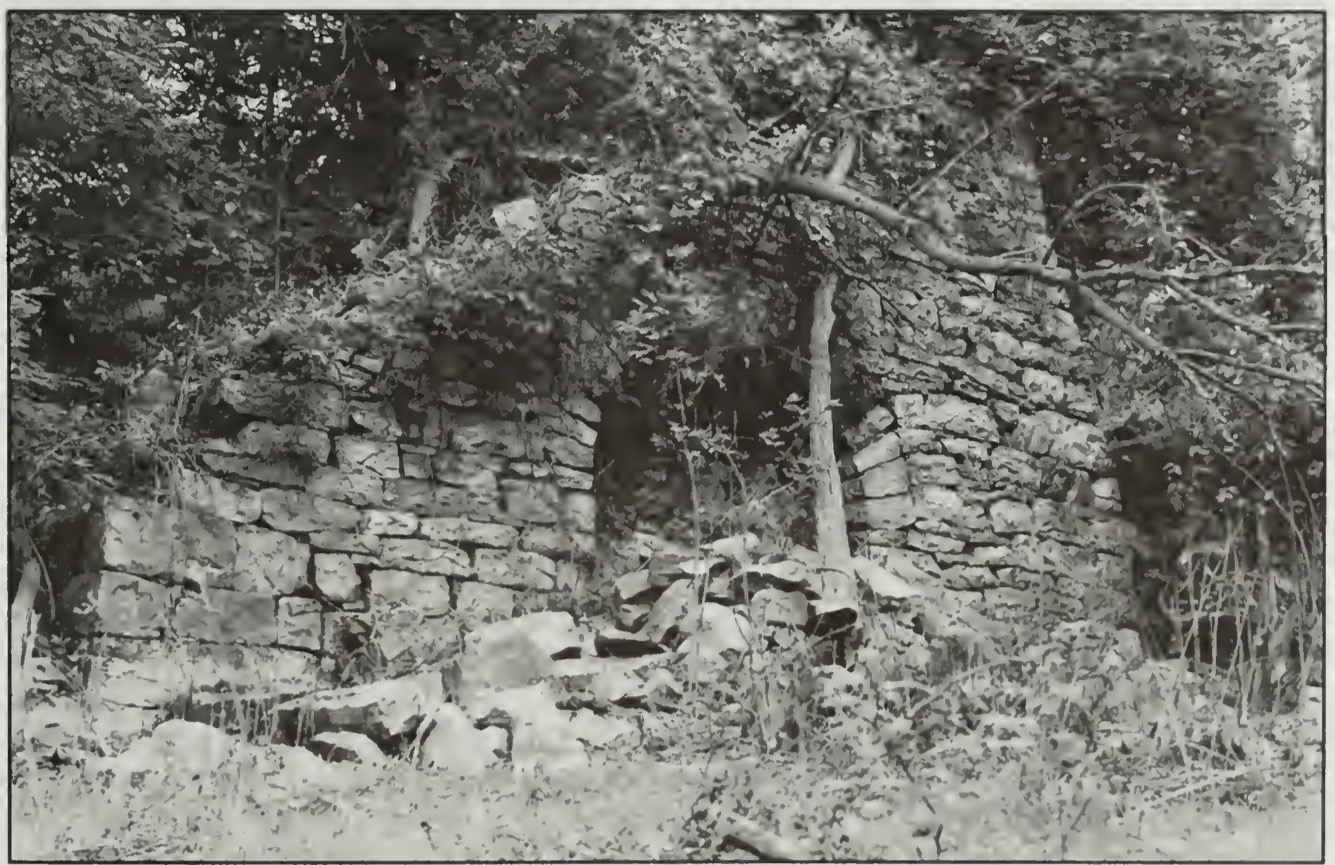
- Ruins, c. 1991

- Location within Pennsylvania Location within the United States
- Location: 2 miles (3.2 km) north of Alexandria along the Juniata River, Porter Township, Pennsylvania
- Coordinates: 40°35′18″N 78°06′04″W
- Area: 8 acres (3.2 ha)
- MPS: Industrial Resources of Huntingdon County, 1780--1939 MPS
- NRHP reference No.: 90000405
- Added to NRHP: March 20, 1990

Barree Forge and Furnace, now known as Greene Hills Methodist Camp, is a national historic district located at Porter Township in Huntingdon County, Pennsylvania. It consists of two contributing buildings, one contributing site, and one contributing structure associated with a former ironworks. They are the ironmaster's mansion, furnace stack, a barn, and the site of the Barree iron forge built about 1797. The ironmaster's mansion was built in the 1830s, and is a 2 1/2-story brick house painted white. The furnace stack dates to 1864, and is a 30-foot square, coursed limestone structure. It measures between 6 and 15 feet tall. The ironworks closed in the 1880s. The property was acquired in 1963, by the United Methodist Church for use as a church camp.

It was listed on the National Register of Historic Places in 1990.
