= Logan Township, Huntingdon County, Pennsylvania =

Township in Pennsylvania, US

Coordinates: 40°34′00″N 77°58′59″W

- Township
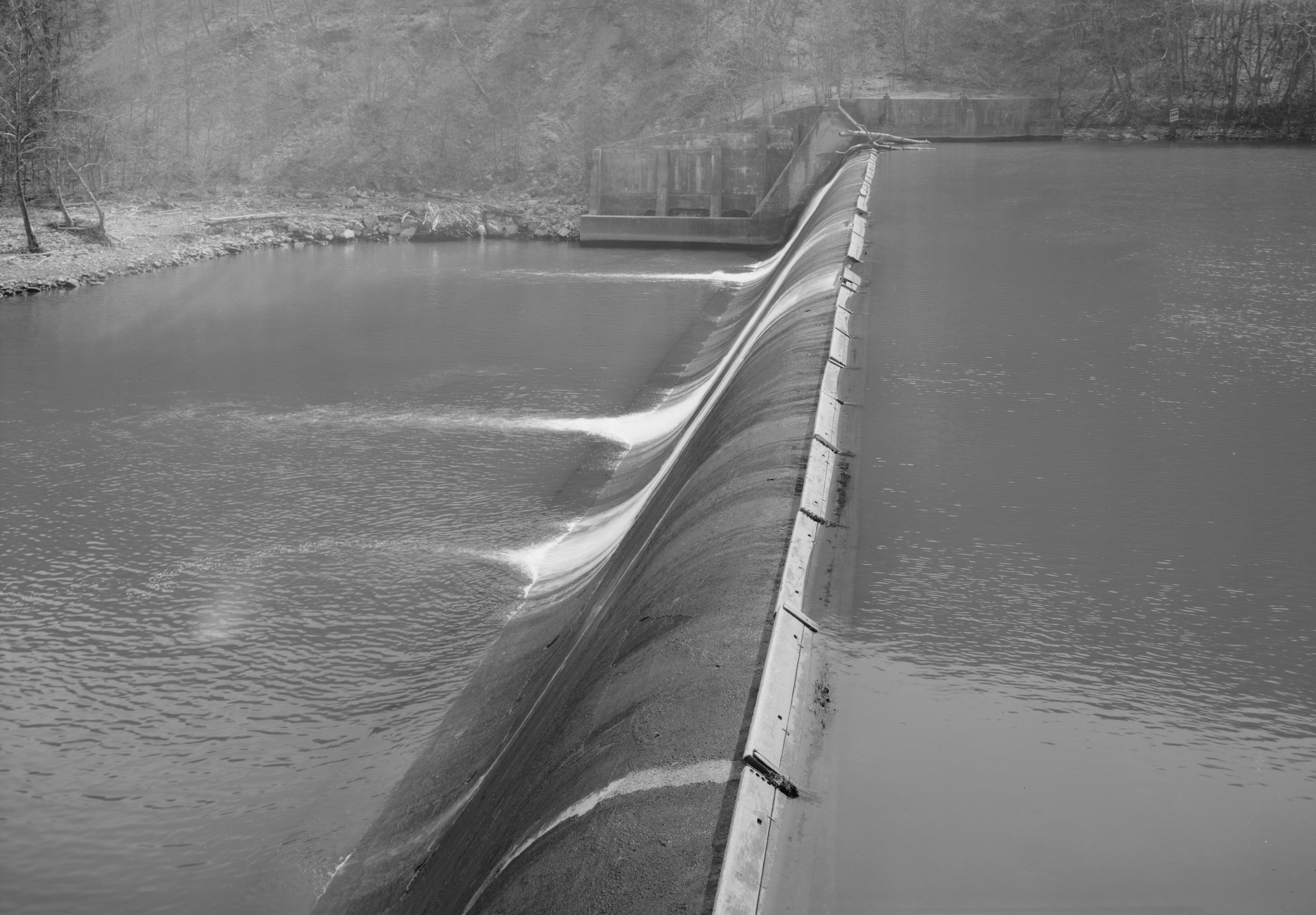
- Warrior Ridge Dam

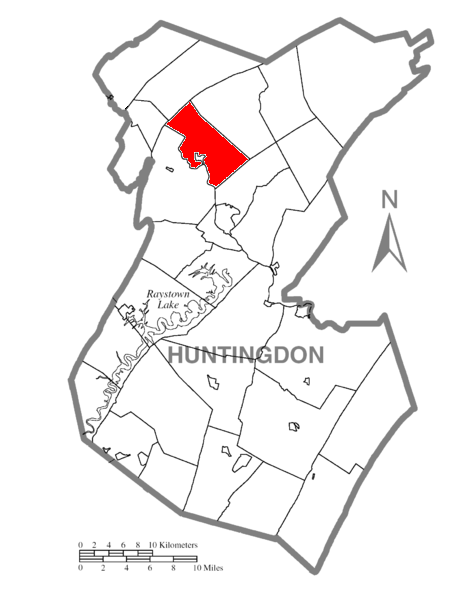
- Map of Huntingdon County, Pennsylvania Highlighting Logan Township

- Map of Huntingdon County, Pennsylvania
- Country: United States
- State: Pennsylvania
- County: Huntingdon

Area
  - Total: 23.02 sq mi (59.63 km^{2})
  - Land: 22.87 sq mi (59.23 km^{2})
  - Water: 0.15 sq mi (0.40 km^{2})

Population (2020)
  - Total: 614 ▼
  - Estimate (2022): 606
  - Density: 29.1/sq mi (11.23/km^{2})
- Time zone: UTC-5 (Eastern (EST))
  - Summer (DST): UTC-4 (EDT)
- Zip code: 16669
- Area code: 814
- FIPS code: 42-061-44344
- Local phone exchanges: 667, 669

Logan Township is a township that is located in Huntingdon County, Pennsylvania, United States. The population was 614 at the time of the 2020 census.

According to the United States Census Bureau, the township has a total area of 22.8 square miles (59.2 km^{2}), of which 22.7 square miles (58.8 km^{2}) is land and 0.2 square mile (0.4 km^{2}) (0.66%) is water.

== Demographics ==
Historical population
| Census | Pop. | Note | %± |
|---|---|---|---|
| 2000 | 703 | | — |
| 2010 | 678 | | −3.6% |
| 2020 | 614 | | −9.4% |
| 2022 (est.) | 606 | | −1.3% |
U.S. Decennial Census

At the time of the 2000 census there were 703 people in 273 households, including 202 families, in the township.

The population density was 31.0 inhabitants per square mile (12.0/km^{2}). There were 315 housing units at an average density of 13.9/sq mi (5.4/km^{2}).

The racial makeup of the township was 97.72% White, 1.56% African American, 0.14% Native American, 0.14% Asian, and 0.43% from two or more races. Hispanic or Latino of any race were 0.14%.

There were 273 households, 33.0% had children under the age of eighteen living with them; 64.5% were married couples living together, 8.1% had a female householder with no husband present, and 26.0% were non-families. 23.4% of households were made up of individuals, and 12.1% were one-person households with residents who were aged sixty-five or older.

The average household size was 2.58 and the average family size was 3.06.

The age distribution was 24.3% who were under the age of eighteen, 7.8% who were aged eighteen to twenty-four, 26.7% who were aged twenty-five to forty-four, 27.3% who were aged forty-five to sixty-four, and 13.8% who were aged sixty-five or older. The median age was forty years.

For every one hundred females there were 100.9 males. For every one hundred females who were aged eighteen or older, there were 101.5 males.

The median household income was $36,083 and the median family income was $39,531. Males had a median income of $26,667 compared with that of $23,438 for females.

The per capita income for the township was $15,051.

Approximately 8.0% of families and 8.5% of the population were living below the poverty line, including 8.4% of those who were under the age of eighteen and 9.5% of those who were aged sixty-five or older.
