= Lloyd and Henry Warehouse =

- U.S. National Register of Historic Places
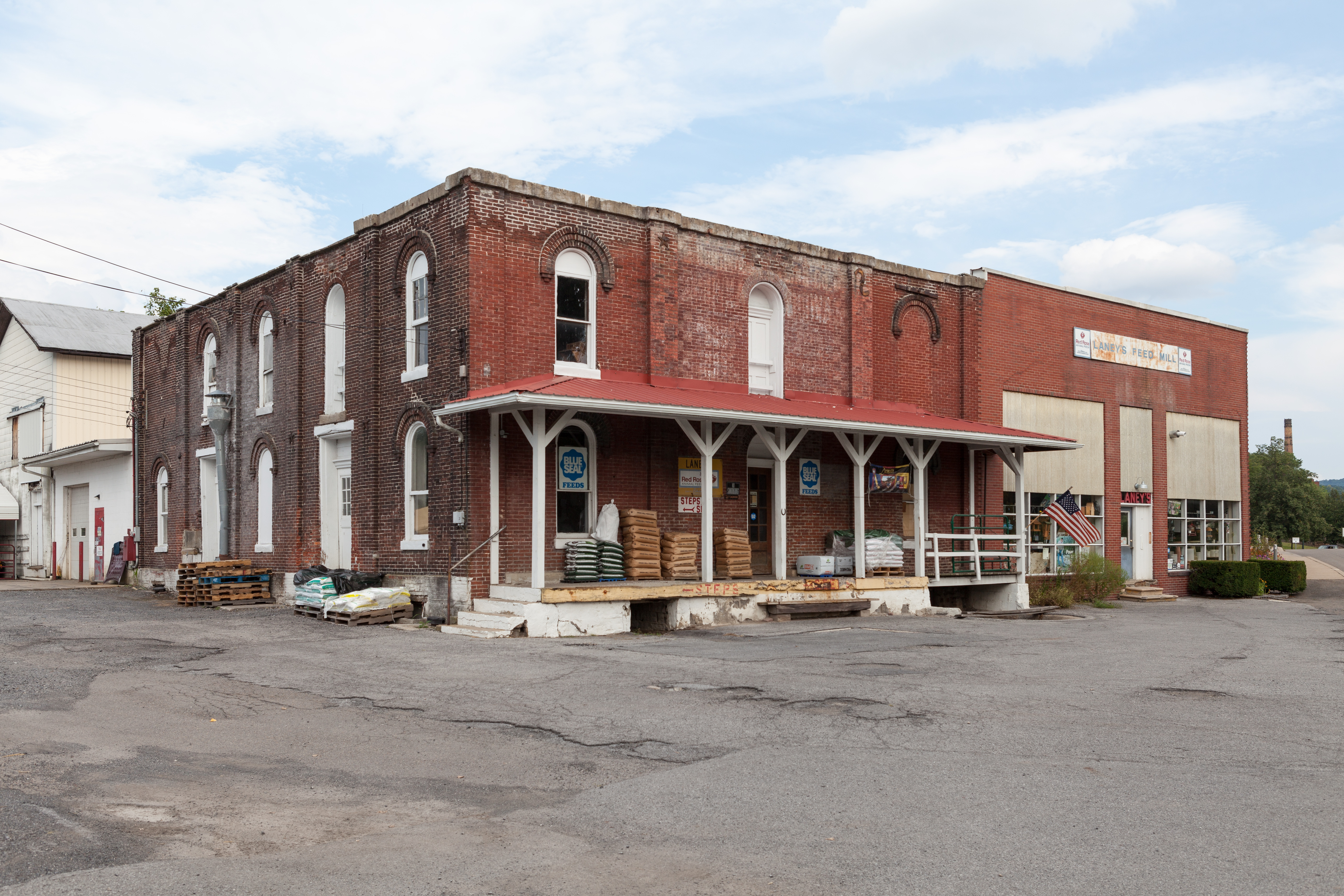
- The warehouse in September, 2014

- Location within Pennsylvania Location within the United States
- Location: Ice Plant Rd., Huntingdon, Pennsylvania
- Coordinates: 40°29′11″N 78°1′5″W
- Area: less than one acre
- Built: 1863
- MPS: Industrial Resources of Huntingdon County, 1780--1939 MPS
- NRHP reference No.: 90000397
- Added to NRHP: March 20, 1990

The Lloyd and Henry Warehouse, also known as Laney's Feed Mill, is an historic warehouse in Huntingdon in Huntingdon County, Pennsylvania, United States.

It was listed on the National Register of Historic Places in 1990.

== History and architectural features ==
This historic structure is two-and-one-half stories tall with a low-pitched, gable roof and full basement. It measures 97 by 35 feet (30 by 11 m). Built by the Pennsylvania Railroad and originally located along the Pennsylvania Canal and railroad line, it was moved to its present location in 1889, after the Johnstown Flood.
