= Porter Township, Huntingdon County, Pennsylvania =

Township in Pennsylvania, US

Coordinates: 40°29′59″N 78°04′59″W

- Township
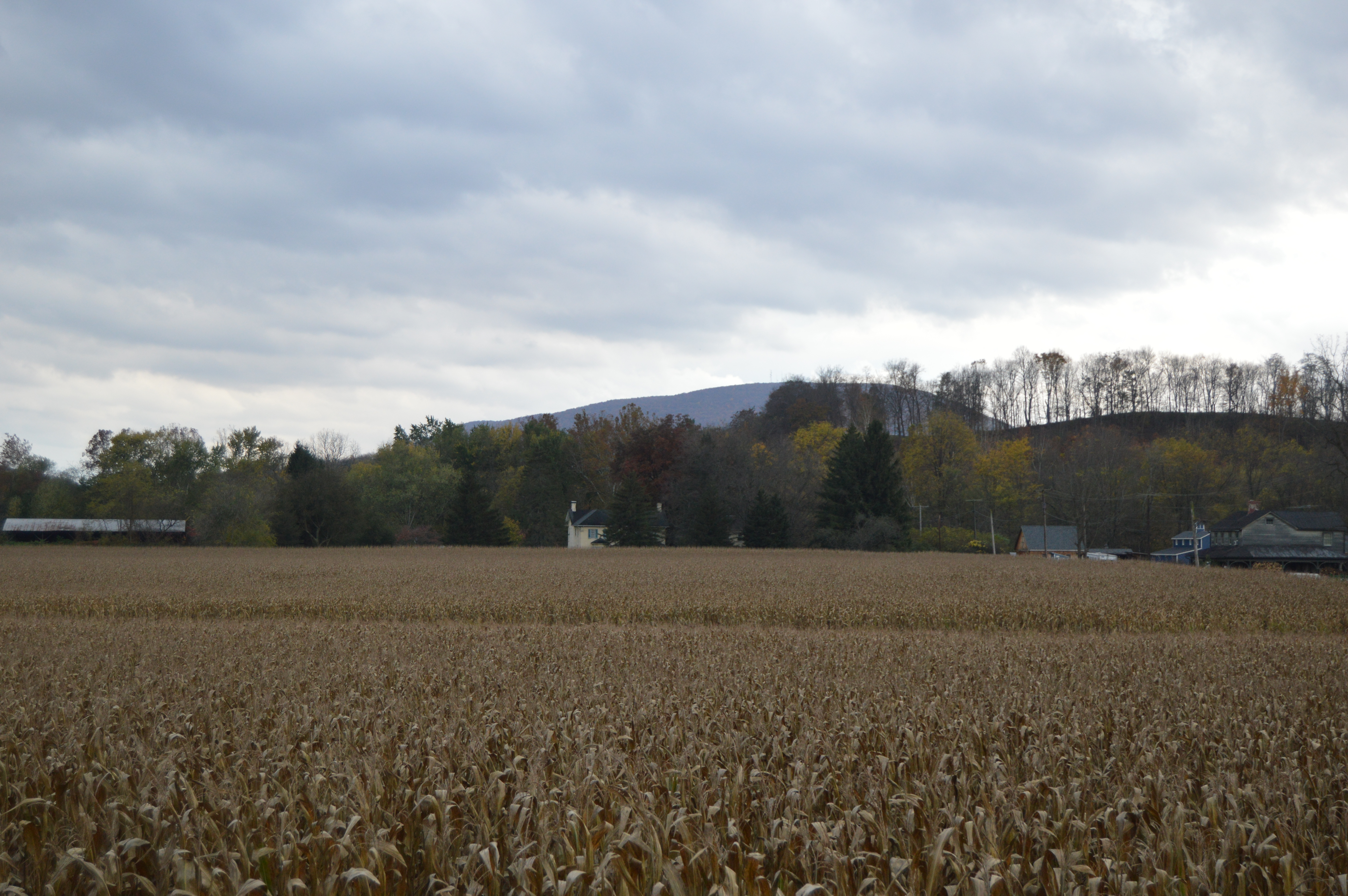
- Fields east of Alexandria

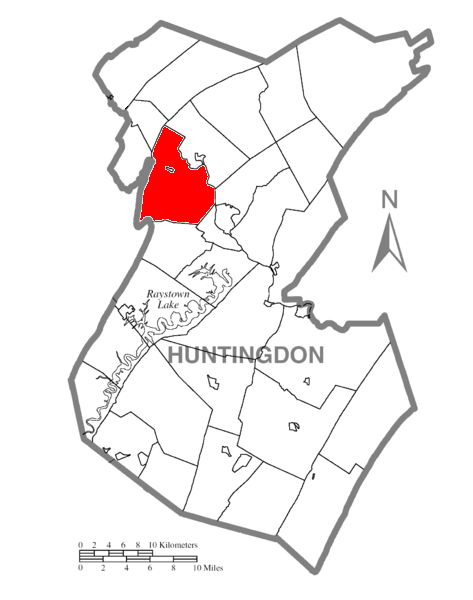
- Map of Huntingdon County, Pennsylvania Highlighting Porter Township

- Map of Huntingdon County, Pennsylvania
- Country: United States
- State: Pennsylvania
- County: Huntingdon

Area
  - Total: 35.47 sq mi (91.87 km^{2})
  - Land: 35.25 sq mi (91.29 km^{2})
  - Water: 0.22 sq mi (0.58 km^{2})

Population (2020)
  - Total: 1,907 ▼
  - Density: 55/sq mi (21.3/km^{2})
- Time zone: UTC-5 (Eastern (EST))
  - Summer (DST): UTC-4 (EDT)
- Zip code: 16611, 16652
- Area code: 814
- FIPS code: 42-061-62160
- Local phone exchanges: 641, 643, 644, 669

Porter Township is a township that is located in Huntingdon County, Pennsylvania, United States. The population was 1,907 at the time of the 2020 census.

== History ==
Porter Township was formed in 1814 out of the former Huntingdon Township and was named for Andrew Porter.

The Juniata Iron Works, Barree Forge and Furnace, and Pulpit Rocks are listed on the National Register of Historic Places.

== Geography ==
According to the United States Census Bureau, the township has a total area of 35.6 square miles (92.3 km^{2}), of which 35.4 square miles (91.6 km^{2}) is land and 0.2 square mile (0.6 km^{2}) (0.67%) is water.

== Demographics ==
Historical population
Census	Pop.	Note	%±
1990	1,906		—
2000	1,917		0.6%
2010	1,968		2.7%
2020	1,907		−3.1%
2022 (est.)	1,879		−1.5%
U.S. Decennial Census

As of the census of 2000, there were 1,917 people, 768 households, and 565 families residing in the township.

The population density was 54.2 inhabitants per square mile (20.9/km^{2}). There were 870 housing units at an average density of 24.6/sq mi (9.5/km^{2}).

The racial makeup of the township was 99.27% White, 0.21% African American, 0.10% Asian, 0.26% from other races, and 0.16% from two or more races. Hispanic or Latino of any race were 0.63% of the population.

There were 768 households, out of which 30.6% had children who were under the age of eighteen living with them; 60.0% were married couples living together, 9.2% had a female householder with no husband present, and 26.4% were non-families. 23.3% of all households were made up of individuals, and 11.1% had someone living alone who was sixty-five years of age or older.

The average household size was 2.50 and the average family size was 2.93.

Within the township, the population was spread out, with 23.7% of residents who were under the age of eighteen, 6.7% who were aged eighteen to twenty-four, 26.1% who were aged twenty-five to sixty-four, 29.7% who were aged forty-five to sixty-four, and 13.8% who were sixty-five years of age or older. The median age was forty-one years.

For every one hundred females, there were 96.8 males. For every one hundred females who were aged eighteen or older, there were 91.7 males.

The median income for a household in the township was $38,145, and the median income for a family was $43,813. Males had a median income of $30,863 compared with that of $23,819 for females.

The per capita income for the township was $16,764.

Approximately 8.3% of families and 10.7% of the population were living below the poverty line, including 15.3% of those who were under the age of eighteen and 7.3% of those who were aged sixty-five or older.

== Gallery ==
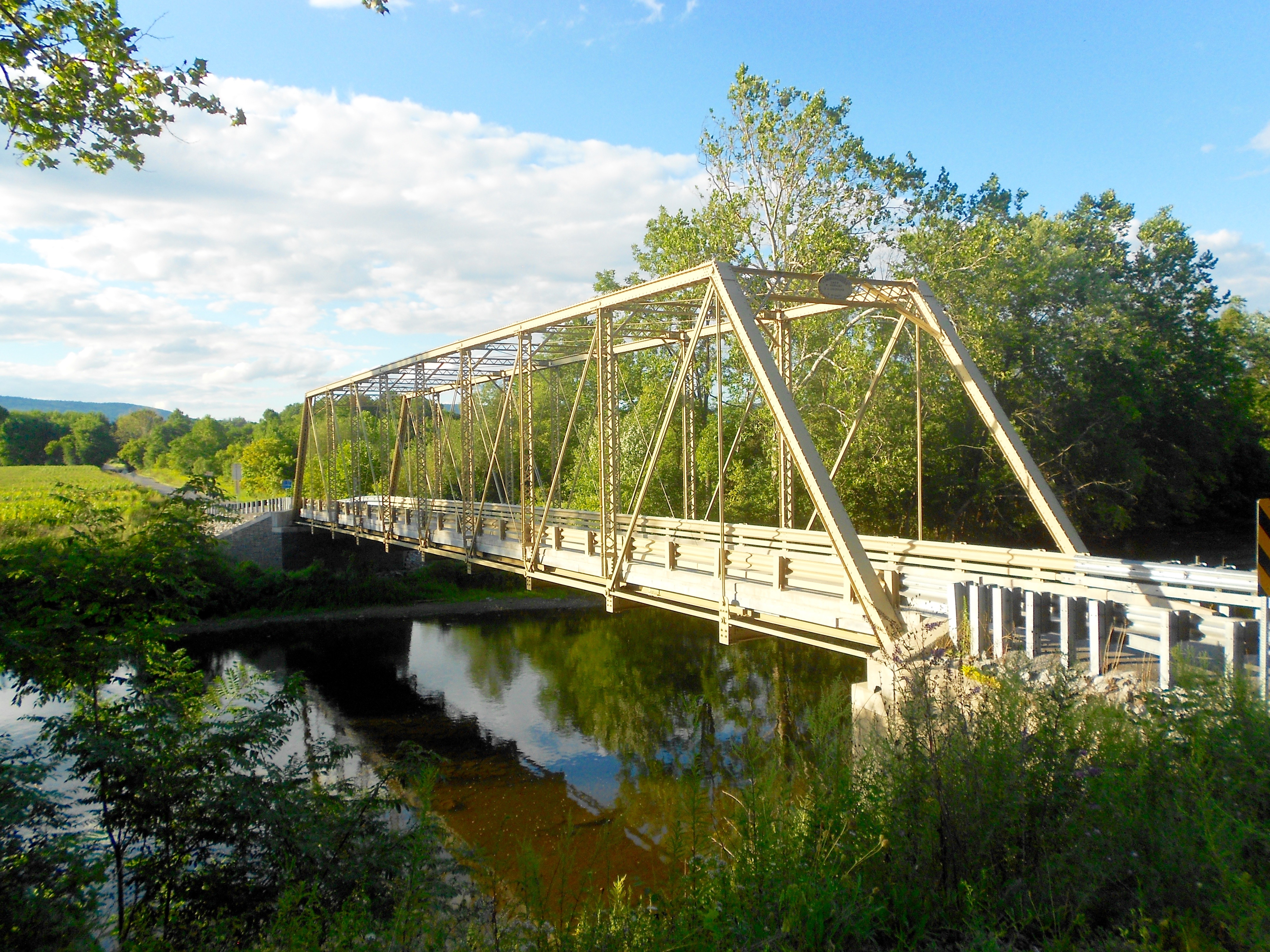
Neff Bridge

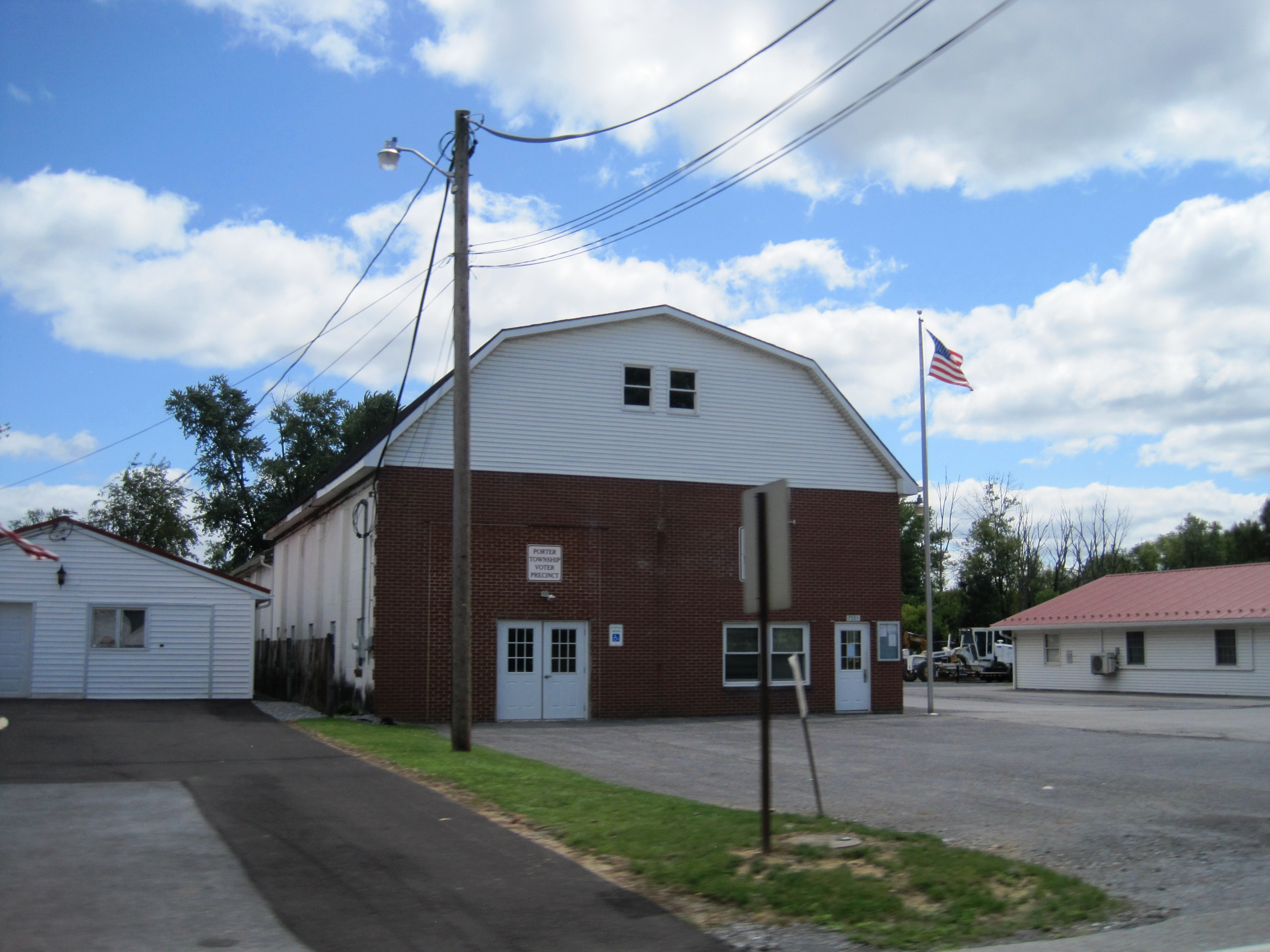
Porter Municipal Building
