= Juniata Iron Works =

- U.S. National Register of Historic Places
- U.S. Historic district
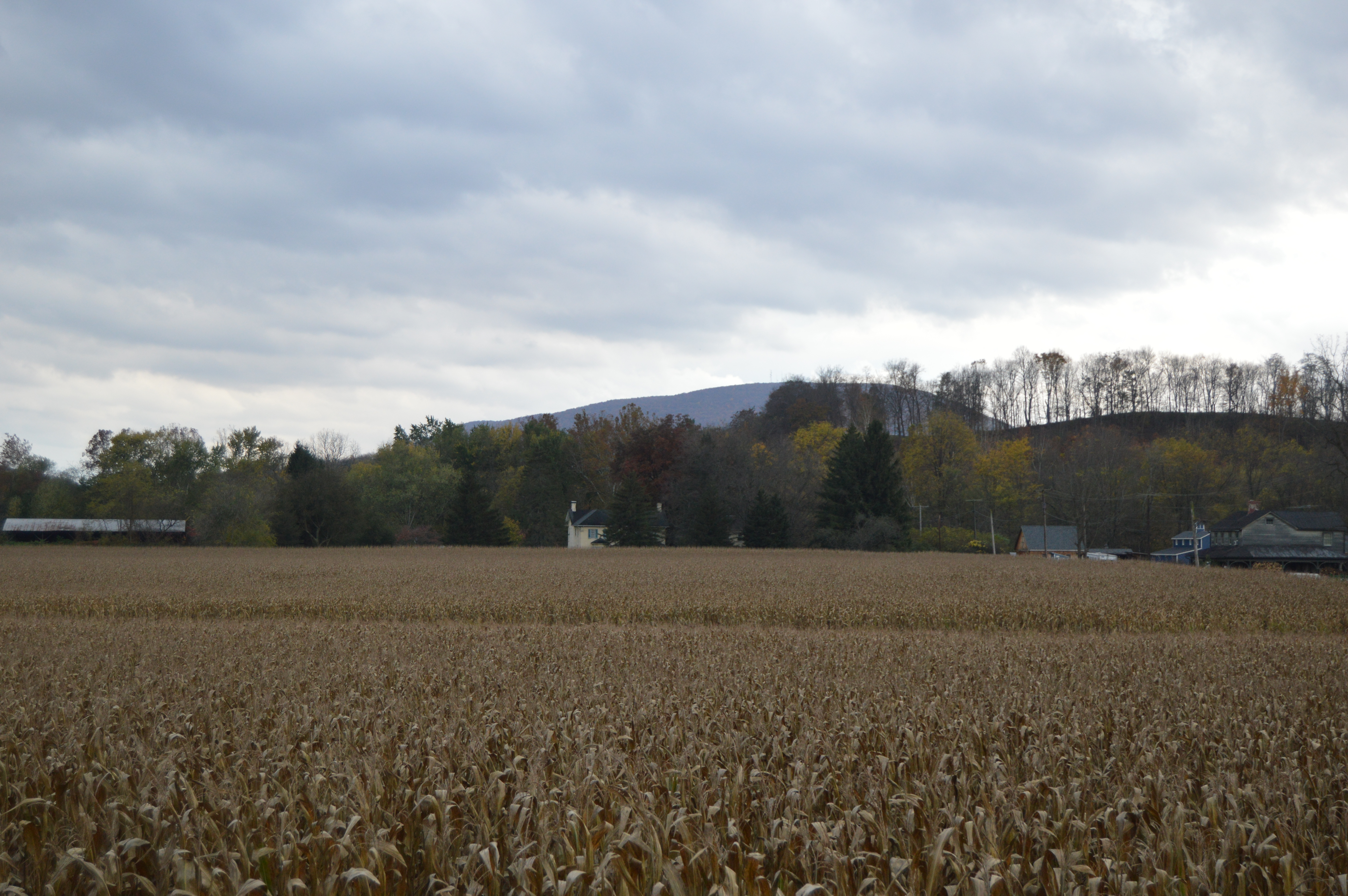
- Overview of the site

- Location within Pennsylvania Location within the United States
- Location: Off Pennsylvania Route 885, 1.5 miles (2.4 km) east of Alexandria, Porter Township, Pennsylvania
- Coordinates: 40°32′32″N 78°05′08″W
- Area: 5 acres (2.0 ha)
- Architectural style: Federal
- MPS: Industrial Resources of Huntingdon County, 1780-1939 MPS
- NRHP reference No.: 90000404
- Added to NRHP: March 20, 1990

The Juniata Iron Works, also known as the Hatfield Iron Works, is a national historic district that is located in Porter Township in Huntingdon County, Pennsylvania.

It was listed on the National Register of Historic Places in 1990.

== History and architectural features ==
This district consists of six contributing buildings that are associated with a former ironworks: two ironmaster's mansions, a store and post office, a grist mill, and two workers houses. The first ironmaster's mansion was built in 1841, and is a 2 1/2-story brick house with a rear ell. The second ironmaster's mansion dates to 1867, and is a 2 1/2-story brick house with a rear ell. It features a Federal-style main entrance. The store and post office has a brick first story and frame second story, and houses a bed and breakfast. The 3 1/2-story grist mill was built in 1856. The buildings are associated with a historic iron furnace that was first developed on the south side of the Frankstown Branch of the Juniata River. The complex moved to the north side in the late-1840s. The iron works closed in the mid-1870s and the machinery dismantled.
