= H.O. Andrews Feed Mill =

- U.S. National Register of Historic Places
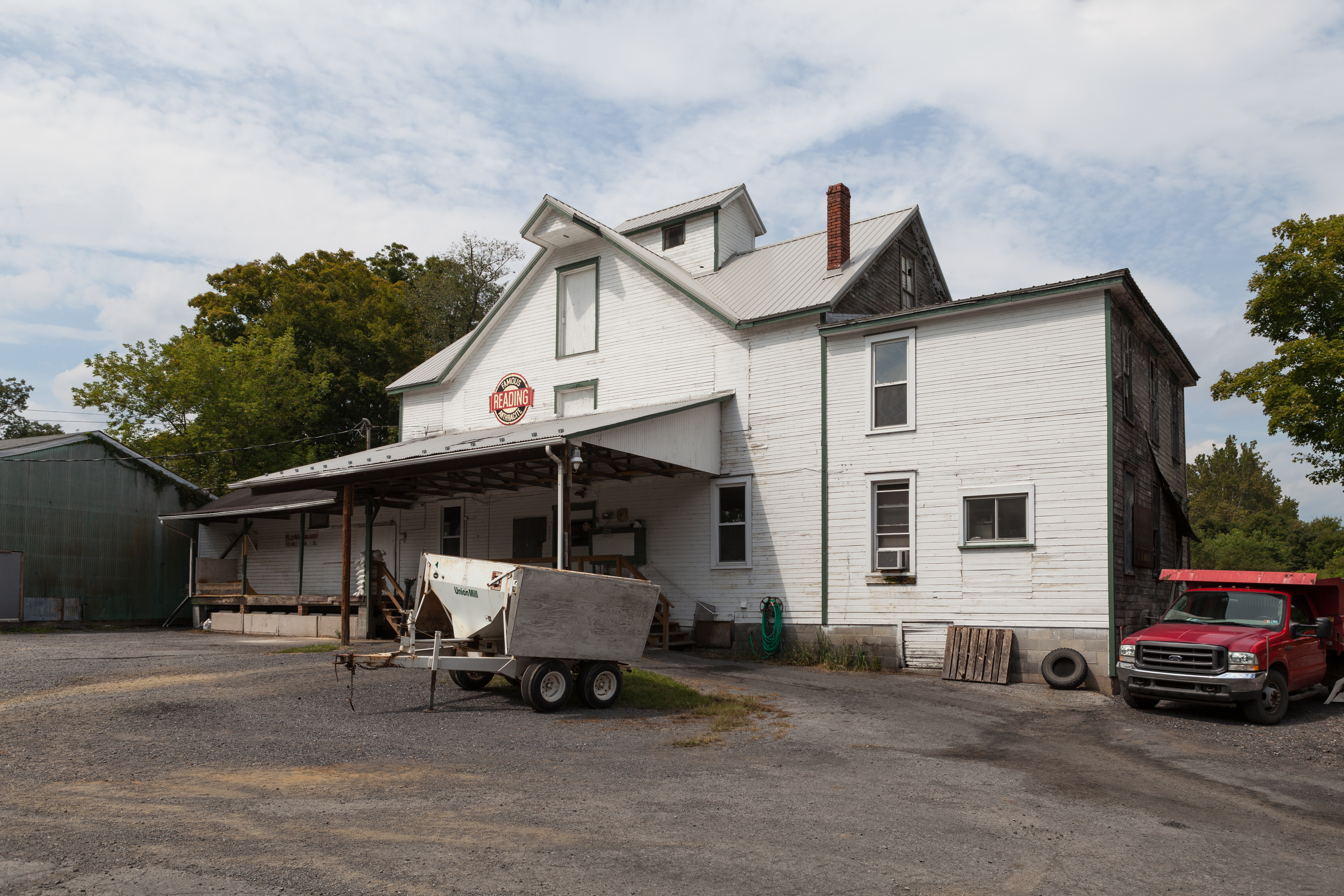
- The mill in September 2014

- Location within Pennsylvania Location within the United States
- Location: W. Main St., Mapleton, Pennsylvania
- Coordinates: 40°23′42″N 77°56′35″W
- Area: 1 acre (0.40 ha)
- Built: 1914
- Built by: Anderson Dell
- MPS: Industrial Resources of Huntingdon County, 1780--1939 MPS
- NRHP reference No.: 90000399
- Added to NRHP: March 20, 1990

The H.O. Andrews Feed Mill, also known as Mapleton Farm and Garden, is an historic feed mill which is located in Mapleton in Huntingdon County, Pennsylvania.

It was listed on the National Register of Historic Places in 1990.

== History and architectural features ==
Built in 1914, this historic mill is a three-and-one-half-story frame building, measuring forty feet by thirty-five feet. It sits on a concrete block foundation and has clapboard siding. Attached to the mill is a two-story frame addition, a coal and lumber storage shed, and one-story frame addition.
