= Dublin Township, Huntingdon County, Pennsylvania =

Township in Pennsylvania, US

Coordinates: 40°06′00″N 77°51′59″W

- Township
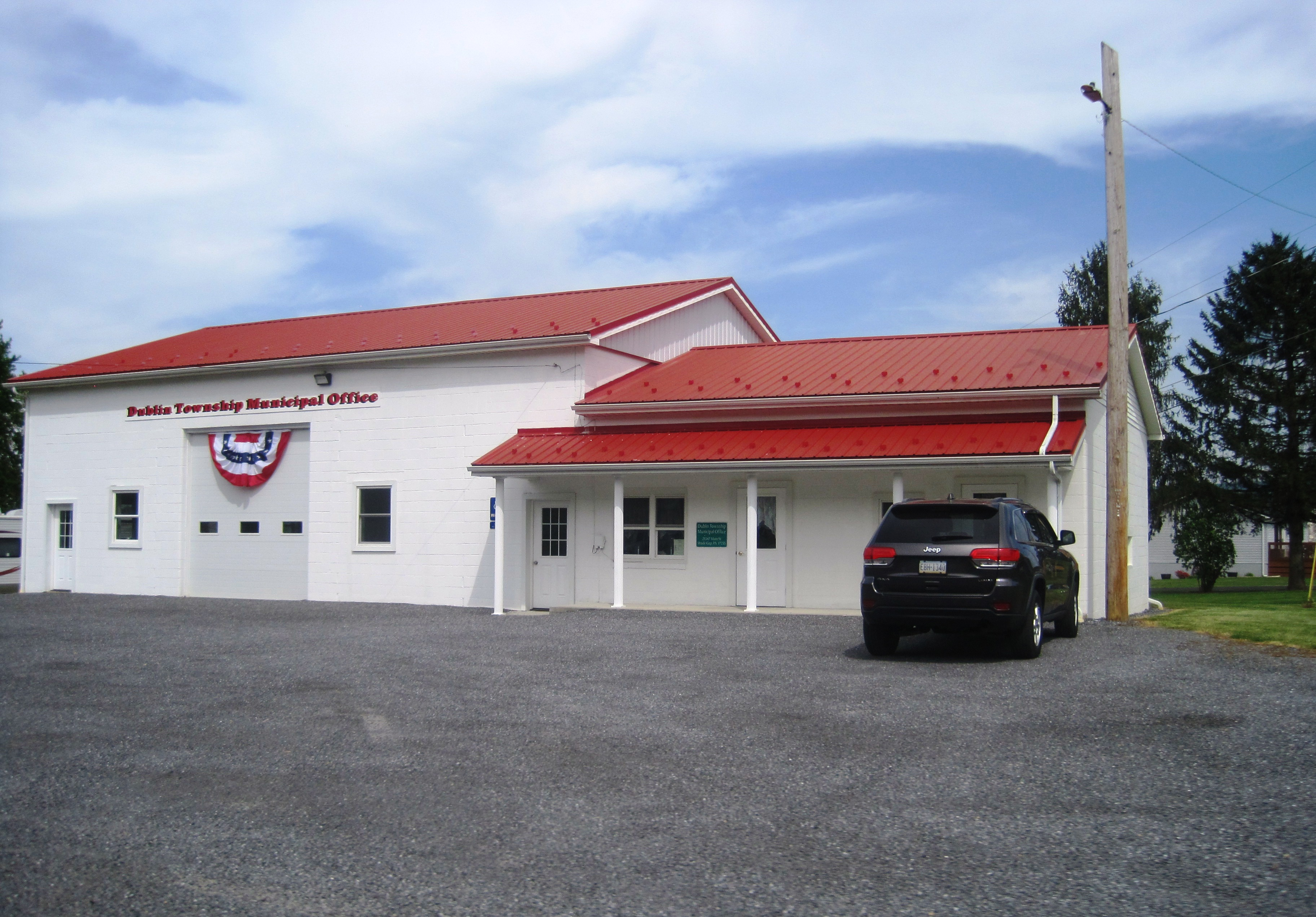
- Dublin municipal building

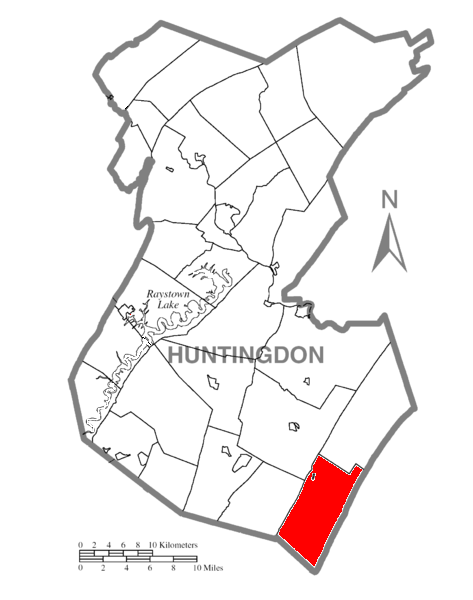
- Map of Huntingdon County, Pennsylvania Highlighting Dublin Township

- Map of Huntingdon County, Pennsylvania
- Country: United States
- State: Pennsylvania
- County: Huntingdon

Area
  - Total: 36.82 sq mi (95.36 km^{2})
  - Land: 36.81 sq mi (95.35 km^{2})
  - Water: 0.0039 sq mi (0.01 km^{2})

Population (2020)
  - Total: 1,182 ▼
  - Estimate (2022): 1,182
  - Density: 34.7/sq mi (13.39/km^{2})
- Time zone: UTC-5 (Eastern (EST))
  - Summer (DST): UTC-4 (EDT)
- FIPS code: 42-061-20120

Dublin Township is a township in Huntingdon County, Pennsylvania, United States. The population was 1,182 at the 2020 census.

== General information ==
- ZIP Code: 17255
- Area Code: 814
- Local phone exchange: 259
- School District: Southern Huntingdon County School District

== History ==
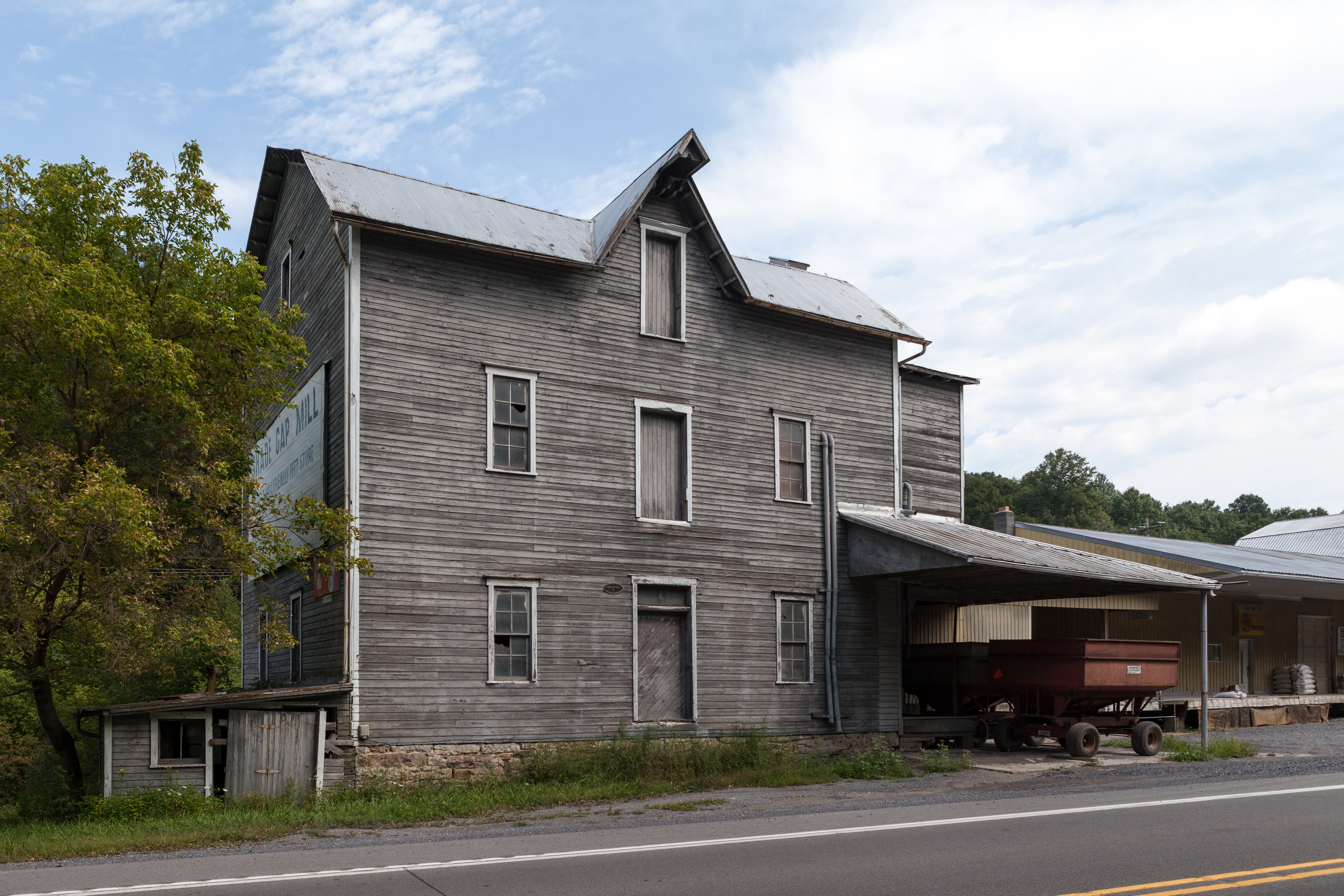
Shade Gap Feed and Flour Mill

The Shade Gap Feed and Flour Mill was listed on the National Register of Historic Places in 1990.

== Geography ==
According to the United States Census Bureau, the township has a total area of 36.7 square miles (95 km^{2}), of which 36.7 square miles (95 km^{2}) is land and 0.03% is water.

== Demographics ==
Historical population
Census	Pop.	Note	%±
2000	1,280		—
2010	1,290		0.8%
2020	1,182		−8.4%
2022 (est.)	1,182		0.0%
U.S. Decennial Census

As of the census of 2000, there were 1,280 people, 478 households, and 364 families residing in the township. The population density was 34.9 inhabitants per square mile (13.5/km^{2}). There were 607 housing units at an average density of 16.5/sq mi (6.4/km^{2}). The racial makeup of the township was 98.75% White, 0.31% African American, 0.16% Native American, 0.08% from other races, and 0.70% from two or more races. Hispanic or Latino of any race were 0.70% of the population.

There were 478 households, out of which 33.3% had children under the age of 18 living with them, 66.3% were married couples living together, 4.8% had a female householder with no husband present, and 23.8% were non-families. 20.7% of all households were made up of individuals, and 8.2% had someone living alone who was 65 years of age or older. The average household size was 2.67 and the average family size was 3.05.

In the township the population was spread out, with 24.5% under the age of 18, 10.1% from 18 to 24, 27.7% from 25 to 44, 23.4% from 45 to 64, and 14.2% who were 65 years of age or older. The median age was 37 years. For every 100 females there were 107.8 males. For every 100 females age 18 and over, there were 106.0 males.

The median income for a household in the township was $35,703, and the median income for a family was $38,750. Males had a median income of $30,865 versus $21,618 for females. The per capita income for the township was $18,592. About 6.0% of families and 8.8% of the population were below the poverty line, including 11.2% of those under age 18 and 9.7% of those age 65 or over.

== See also ==
Irish Place Names in Other Countries
