= Marklesburg Historic District =

Historic district in Pennsylvania, United States

- U.S. National Register of Historic Places
- U.S. Historic district
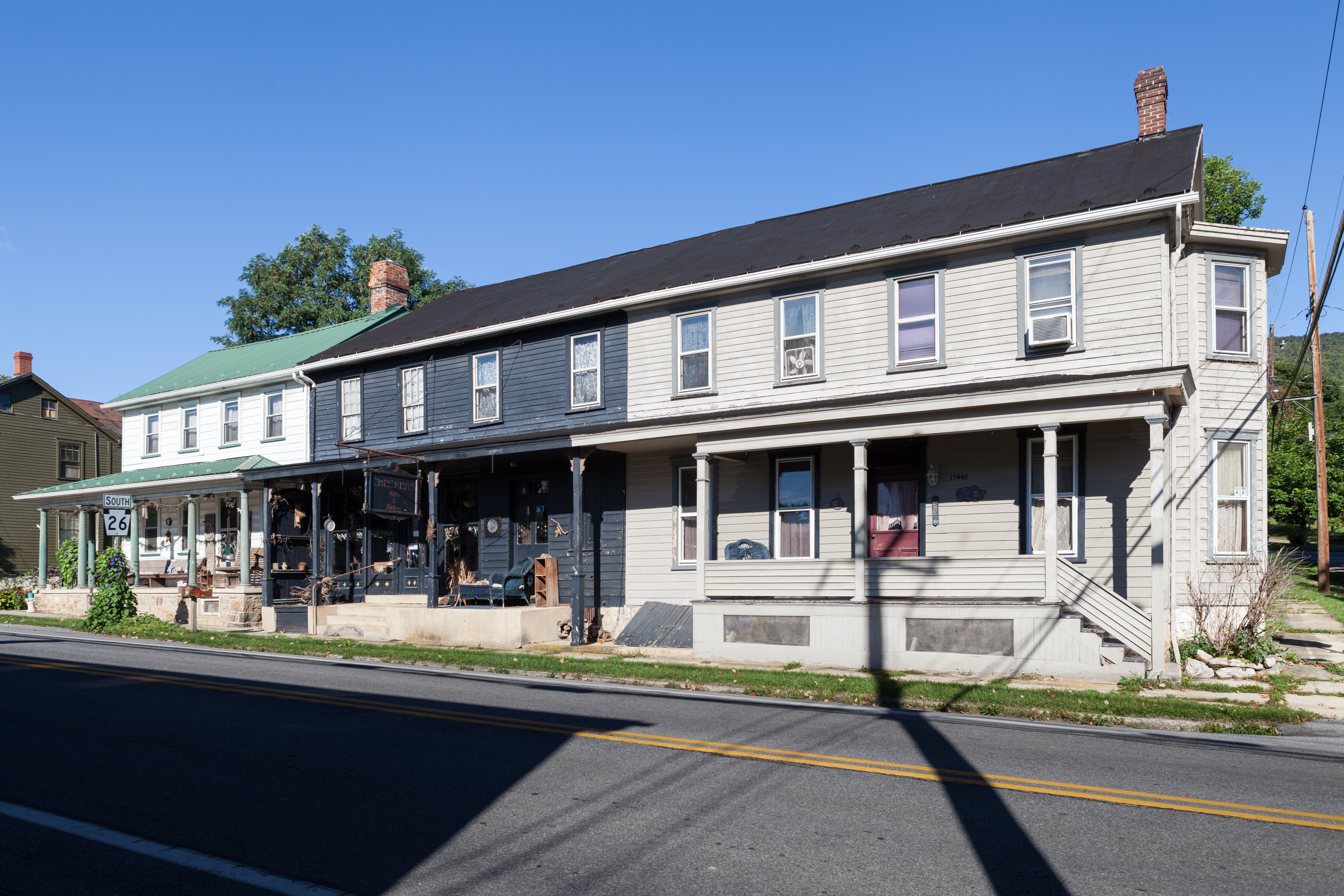
- The northwest side of Raystown Rd at the intersection with Chestnut and Aitch (also known as Clay, PA 3010, and Railroad St)

- Location within Pennsylvania Location within the United States
- Location: Jct. of PA 26 and PA 3010, Marklesburg, Pennsylvania
- Coordinates: 40°22′57″N 78°10′22″W
- Area: 35 acres (14 ha)
- Architectural style: Gothic Revival
- NRHP reference No.: 96000084
- Added to NRHP: February 16, 1996

The Marklesburg Historic District is a national historic district that is located in Marklesburg in Huntingdon County, Pennsylvania.

It was listed on the National Register of Historic Places in 1996.

== History and architectural features ==
The district includes fifty-eight contributing buildings and one contributing site. The buildings primarily date from circa 1845 to 1870 and include notable example of the Gothic Revival style. They are primarily of wood construction, and reflect the development of the community as a local service and commercial center for local agricultural and industrial customers. Notable buildings include the former Town Hall, former Indian Queen Hotel, former James Creek School House, former Methodist Episcopal Church, and St. Matthew's Lutheran Church. The Union Cemetery is the contributing site.
