= Mapleton, Pennsylvania =

Borough in Pennsylvania, US

- Borough
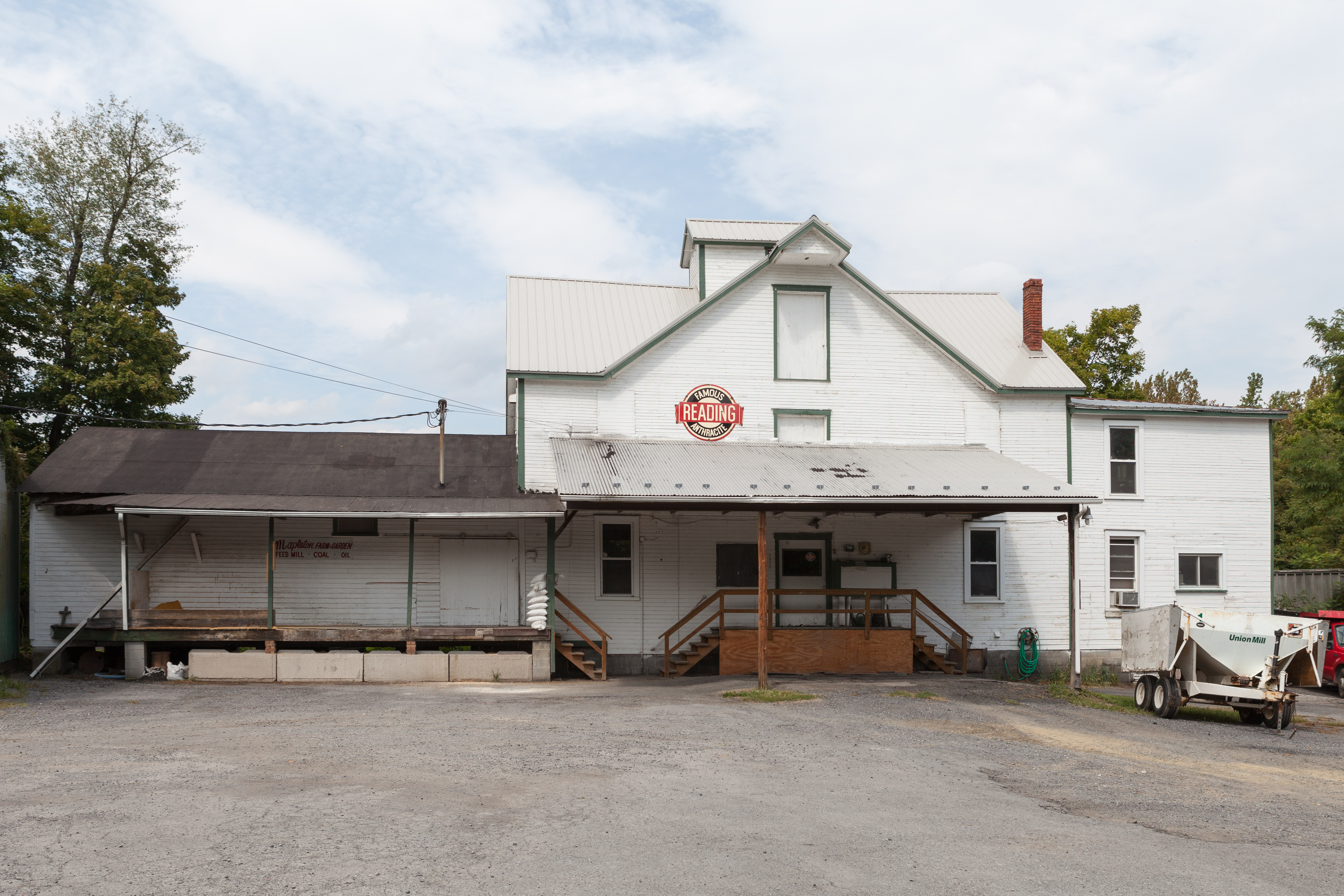
- H.O. Andrews Feed Mill on Main Street

- Location of Mapleton in Huntingdon County, Pennsylvania.

- Location within Pennsylvania Location within the United States
- Coordinates: 40°23′34″N 77°56′28″W
- Country: United States
- State: Pennsylvania
- County: Huntingdon

Government
  - Type: Borough Council
  - Mayor: Bonnie Cramer

Area
  - Total: 0.19 sq mi (0.50 km^{2})
  - Land: 0.18 sq mi (0.47 km^{2})
  - Water: 0.0077 sq mi (0.02 km^{2})
- Elevation: 594 ft (181 m)

Population (2020)
  - Total: 418
  - Density: 2,285.2/sq mi (882.32/km^{2})
- Time zone: UTC-5 (Eastern (EST))
  - Summer (DST): UTC-4 (EDT)
- Zip code: 17052
- Area code: 814
- FIPS code: 42-47248
- GNIS feature ID: 1215271
- Website: http://www.mapleton-pa.com/index.htm
- Local phone exchanges: 542, 543

Mapleton is a borough in Huntingdon County, Pennsylvania, United States. As of the 2020 census, Mapleton had a population of 418. It is located on the Juniata River, which is a tributary of the Susquehanna River.

== History ==
Mapleton was founded when the Pennsylvania Railroad was extended to that point. The community was named for a grove of maple trees near the original town site.

The H.O. Andrews Feed Mill was listed on the National Register of Historic Places in 1990.

== Geography ==
Mapleton is located in east-central Huntingdon County on the south bank of the Juniata River at the west entrance of that river's water gap through Jacks Mountain. Pennsylvania Route 655 passes through the center of the borough, leading south 14 miles (23 km) to Saltillo and north 2 miles (3 km) to U.S. Route 22. US 22 leads east 4 miles (6 km) to Mount Union and northwest 8 miles (13 km) to Huntingdon, the county seat.

According to the United States Census Bureau, Mapleton has a total area of 0.19 square miles (0.5 km^{2}), of which 0.01 square miles (0.02 km^{2}), or 4.40%, are water.

== Demographics ==
Historical population
Census	Pop.	Note	%±
1870	389		—
1880	444		14.1%
1890	715		61.0%
1900	612		−14.4%
1910	752		22.9%
1920	802		6.6%
1930	894		11.5%
1940	803		−10.2%
1950	742		−7.6%
1960	666		−10.2%
1970	661		−0.8%
1980	591		−10.6%
1990	529		−10.5%
2000	470		−11.2%
2010	439		−6.6%
2020	418		−4.8%

As of the census of 2000, there were 473 people, 191 households, and 135 families residing in the borough. The population density was 2,173.1 inhabitants per square mile (839.0/km^{2}). There were 201 housing units at an average density of 923.5 per square mile (356.6/km^{2}). The racial makeup of the borough was 97.67% White, 0.42% African American, 0.21% from other races, and 1.69% from two or more races. Hispanic or Latino of any race were 0.21% of the population.

There were 191 households, out of which 28.3% had children under the age of 18 living with them, 58.1% were married couples living together, 7.9% had a female householder with no husband present, and 28.8% were non-families. 22.0% of all households were made up of individuals, and 12.6% had someone living alone who was 65 years of age or older. The average household size was 2.48 and the average family size was 2.89.

In the borough the population was spread out, with 22.0% under the age of 18, 7.0% from 18 to 24, 28.1% from 25 to 44, 26.2% from 45 to 64, and 16.7% who were 65 years of age or older. The median age was 41 years. For every 100 females there were 88.4 males. For every 100 females age 18 and over, there were 92.2 males.

The median income for a household in the borough was $32,500, and the median income for a family was $38,125. Males had a median income of $35,556 versus $19,286 for females. The per capita income for the borough was $14,431. About 12.6% of families and 15.6% of the population were below the poverty line, including 17.9% of those under age 18 and 9.8% of those age 65 or over.
