= Christian Oyer Jr. House =

Historic house in Pennsylvania, United States

- U.S. National Register of Historic Places
- Location within Pennsylvania Location within the United States
- Location: Township Road 513, northeast of Huntingdon, Barree Township, Pennsylvania
- Coordinates: 40°36′34″N 77°53′54″W
- Area: 1.8 acres (0.73 ha)
- Built: c. 1830
- Architectural style: Federal
- NRHP reference No.: 95000882
- Added to NRHP: July 21, 1995

Christian Oyer Jr. House, also known as Harmon House, is a historic home located at Barree Township in Huntingdon County, Pennsylvania. It was built about 1830, and is a two-story, five-bay, rectangular Federal style stone dwelling. It measures 32 feet by 42 feet.

It was listed on the National Register of Historic Places in 1995.
