= Mount Union Refractories Company =

- Formerly listed on the U.S. National Register of Historic Places
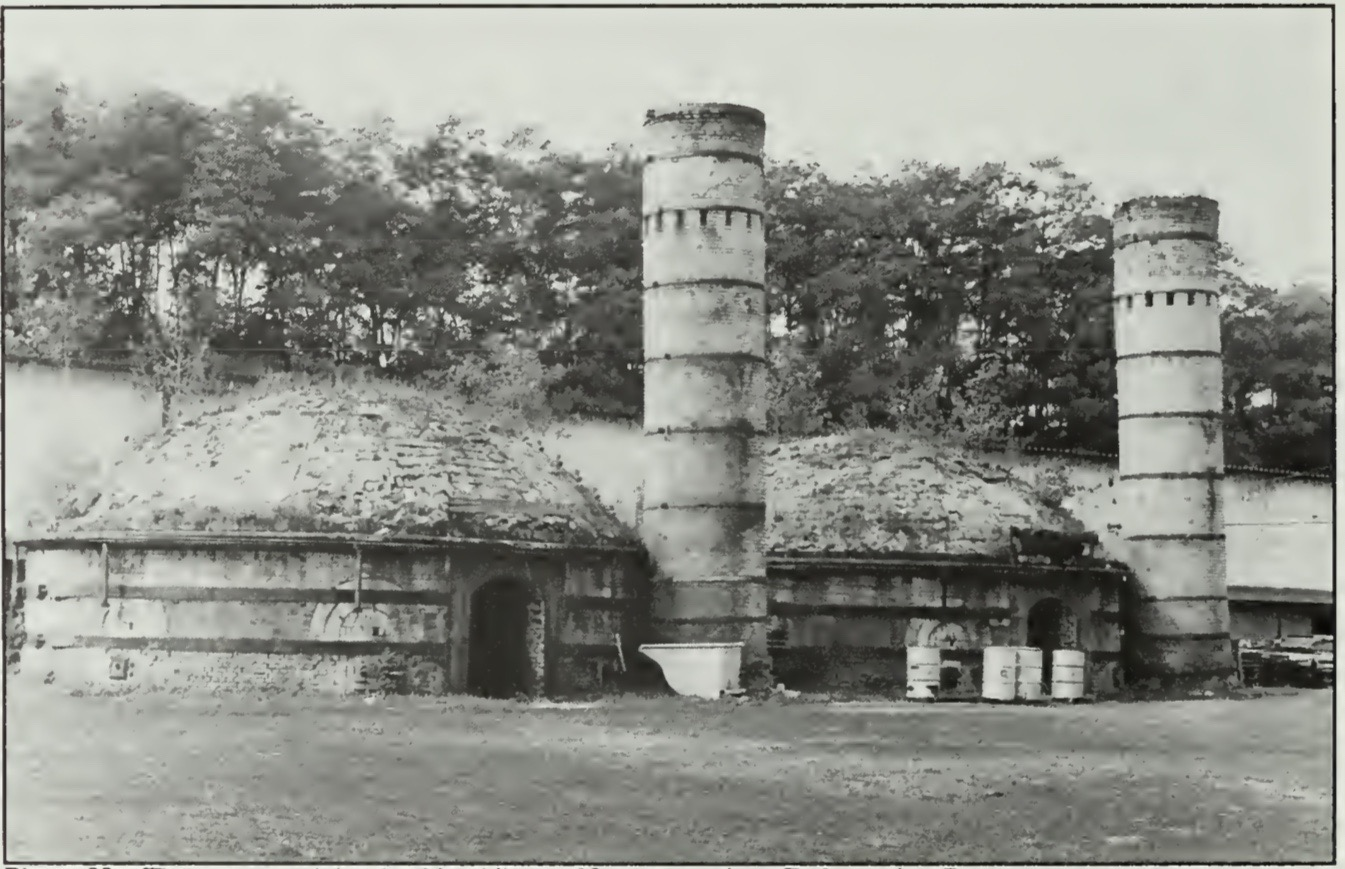
- Mount Union Refractories beehive ovens, 1991

- Location within Pennsylvania
- Location: Pennsylvania Ave. at Juniata River, Mount Union, Pennsylvania
- Coordinates: 40°23′26″N 77°53′30″W
- Area: 7 acres (2.8 ha)
- Built: 1912-1939
- MPS: Industrial Resources of Huntingdon County, 1780--1939 MPS
- NRHP reference No.: 90000398

Significant dates
- Added to NRHP: March 20, 1990
- Removed from NRHP: September 13, 1996

The Mount Union Refractories Company was a national historic district and historic refractory brick manufacturing complex located at Mount Union in Huntingdon County, Pennsylvania. The historic district encompassed nine contributing buildings (office, production building, maintenance building, dust or mortar mill, and storage sheds) and two contributing structures (brick kilns).

It was listed on the National Register of Historic Places in 1990, and delisted in 1996, after many of the contributing buildings were demolished.
