= Barree Township, Pennsylvania =

Township in Pennsylvania, US

Coordinates: 40°40′00″N 77°54′59″W

- Township
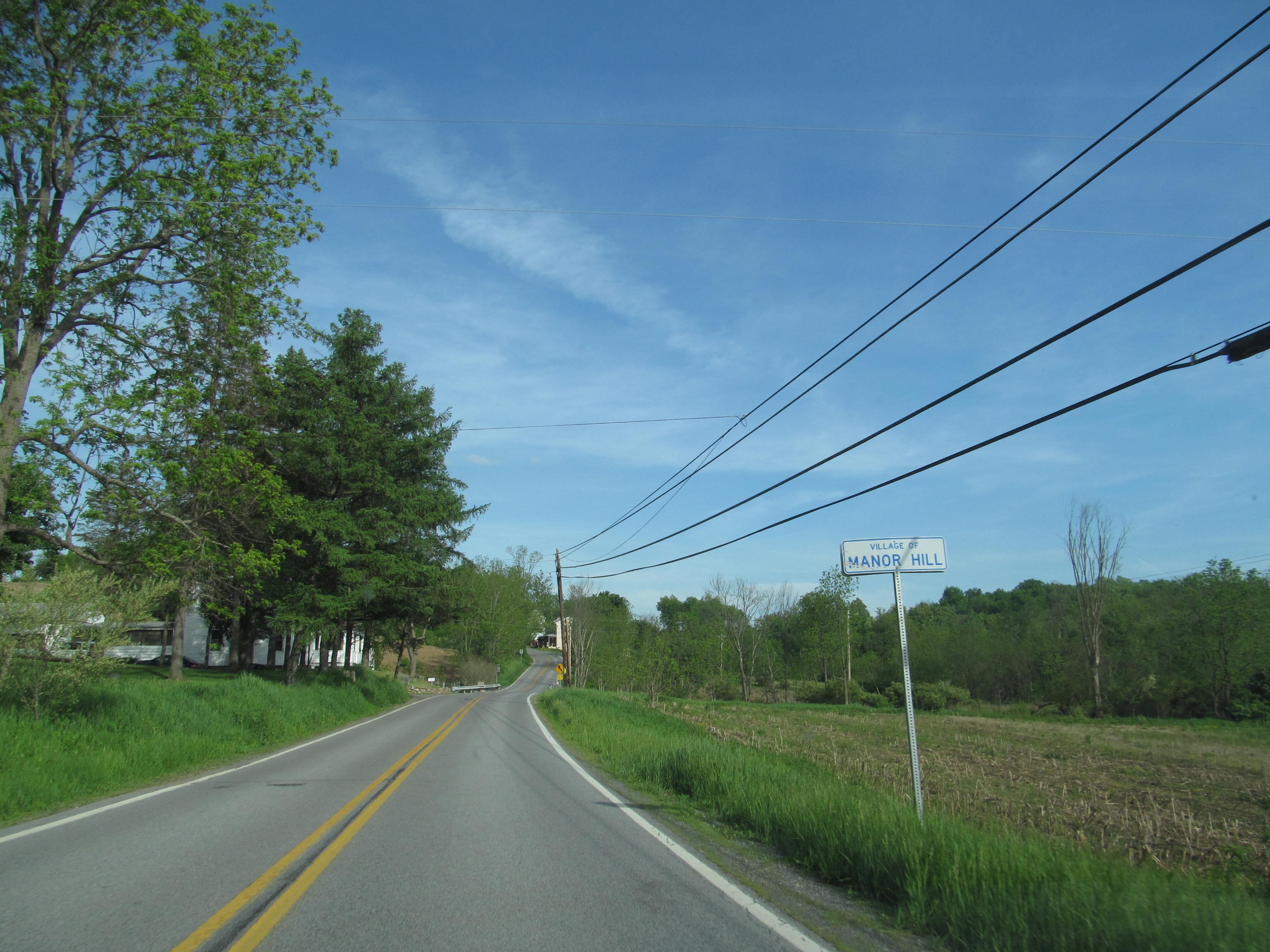
- PA 305 entering the Barree Township village of Manor Hill

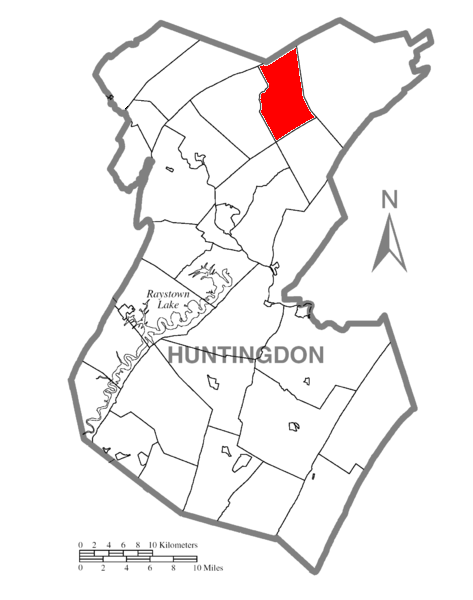
- Map of Huntingdon County, Pennsylvania Highlighting Barree Township

- Map of Huntingdon County, Pennsylvania
- Country: United States
- State: Pennsylvania
- County: Huntingdon

Area
  - Total: 24.11 sq mi (62.44 km^{2})
  - Land: 24.00 sq mi (62.15 km^{2})
  - Water: 0.12 sq mi (0.30 km^{2})

Population (2020)
  - Total: 432 ▼
  - Estimate (2022): 425
  - Density: 19.7/sq mi (7.61/km^{2})
- Time zone: UTC-5 (Eastern (EST))
  - Summer (DST): UTC-4 (EDT)
- FIPS code: 42-061-04288

Barree Township is a township in Huntingdon County, Pennsylvania, United States. The population was 432 at the 2020 census.

== History ==
The Monroe Furnace and Christian Oyer Jr. House are listed on the National Register of Historic Places.

== Geography ==
According to the United States Census Bureau, the township has a total area of 24.1 square miles (62 km^{2}), of which 23.9 square miles (62 km^{2}) is land and 0.1 square miles (0.26 km^{2}) (0.50%) is water.

== Demographics ==
Historical population
Census	Pop.	Note	%±
2000	460		—
2010	469		2.0%
2020	432		−7.9%
2022 (est.)	425		−1.6%
U.S. Decennial Census

As of the census of 2000, there were 460 people, 178 households, and 132 families residing in the township. The population density was 19.2 people per square mile (7.4/km^{2}). There were 247 housing units at an average density of 10.3/sq mi (4.0/km^{2}). The racial makeup of the township was 99.78% White, and 0.22% from two or more races.

There were 178 households, out of which 29.8% had children under the age of 18 living with them, 65.2% were married couples living together, 6.7% had a female householder with no husband present, and 25.8% were non-families. 21.9% of all households were made up of individuals, and 7.9% had someone living alone who was 65 years of age or older. The average household size was 2.58 and the average family size was 3.04.

In the township the population was spread out, with 25.2% under the age of 18, 6.5% from 18 to 24, 30.2% from 25 to 44, 28.9% from 45 to 64, and 9.1% who were 65 years of age or older. The median age was 37 years. For every 100 females, there were 114.0 males. For every 100 females age 18 and over, there were 103.6 males.

The median income for a household in the township was $39,740, and the median income for a family was $41,818. Males had a median income of $29,028 versus $26,786 for females. The per capita income for the township was $17,762. None of the families and 2.8% of the population were living below the poverty line, including no under eighteens and 10.8% of those over 64.
