= Spruce Creek Township, Pennsylvania =

Township in Pennsylvania, US

Coordinates: 40°37′36″N 78°07′28″W

- Township
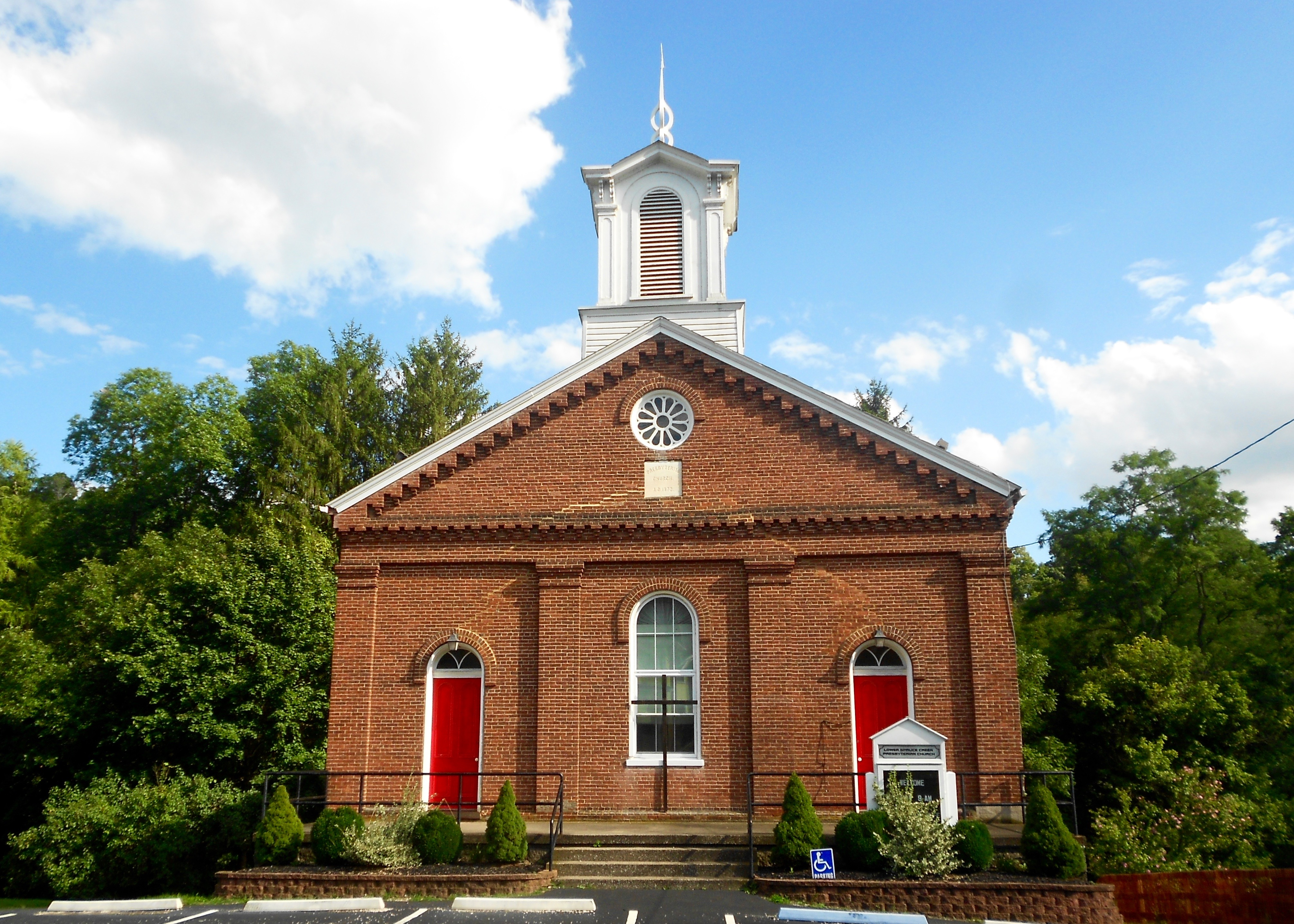
- Lower Spruce Creek Presbyterian Church in the village of Spruce Creek

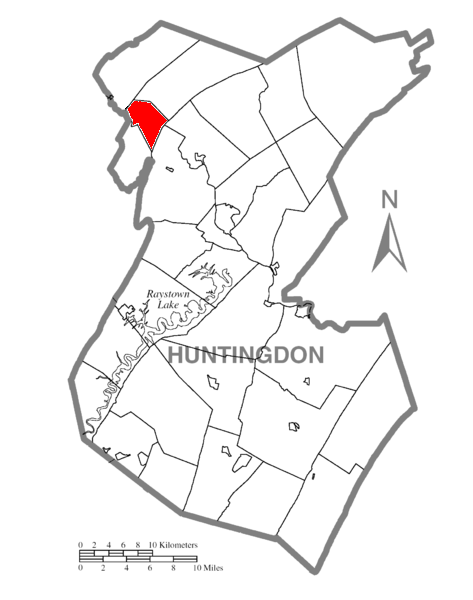
- Map of Huntingdon County, Pennsylvania Highlighting Spruce Creek Township

- Map of Huntingdon County, Pennsylvania
- Country: United States
- State: Pennsylvania
- County: Huntingdon

Area
  - Total: 8.54 sq mi (22.13 km^{2})
  - Land: 8.46 sq mi (21.92 km^{2})
  - Water: 0.081 sq mi (0.21 km^{2})

Population (2020)
  - Total: 201 ▼
  - Density: 23.51/sq mi (9.078/km^{2})
- Time zone: UTC-5 (Eastern (EST))
  - Summer (DST): UTC-4 (EDT)
- FIPS code: 42-061-73488

Spruce Creek Township is a township that is located in Huntingdon County, Pennsylvania, United States. The population was 201 at the time of the 2020 census.

== Geography ==
According to the United States Census Bureau, the township has a total area of 8.2 square miles (21.4 km^{2}), of which 8.2 square miles (21.2 km^{2}) is land and 0.1 square mile (0.2 km^{2}) (0.73%) is water.

== Demographics ==
Historical population
Census	Pop.	Note	%±
1900	789		—
1910	757		−4.1%
1920	718		−5.2%
1930	525		−26.9%
1940	386		−26.5%
1950	338		−12.4%
1960	335		−0.9%
1970	348		3.9%
1980	366		5.2%
1990	281		−23.2%
2000	263		−6.4%
2010	238		−9.5%
2020	201		−15.5%
2022 (est.)	198		−1.5%
U.S. Decennial Census

As of the census of 2000, there were 263 people, 117 households, and 76 families residing in the township.

The population density was 32.1 inhabitants per square mile (12.4/km^{2}). There were 146 housing units at an average density of 17.8/sq mi (6.9/km^{2}).

The racial makeup of the township was 100.00% White.

There were 117 households, out of which 29.9% had children under the age of 18 living with them; 54.7% were married couples living together, 7.7% had a female householder with no husband present, and 34.2% were non-families. 31.6% of all households were made up of individuals, and 11.1% had someone living alone who was 65 years of age or older.

The average household size was 2.25 and the average family size was 2.77.

Within the township, the population was spread out, with 21.3% of residents who were under the age of 18, 5.3% from 18 to 24, 27.4% from 25 to 44, 33.8% from 45 to 64, and 12.2% who were 65 years of age or older. The median age was 43 years.

For every 100 females, there were 97.7 males. For every 100 females age 18 and over, there were 89.9 males.

The median income for a household in the township was $33,750, and the median income for a family was $47,188. Males had a median income of $30,156 versus $26,250 for females.

The per capita income for the township was $18,148.

Approximately 5.2% of families and 9.2% of the population were living below the poverty line, including 3.4% of those under the age of eighteen and 11.5% of those who were sixty-five or older.
