= Buchanan State Forest =

State forest in Pennsylvania, United States

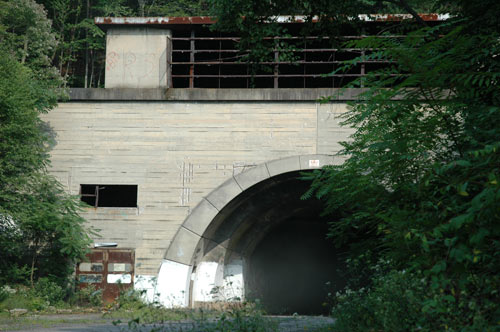
- Sideling Hill Tunnel is now surrounded by Buchanan State Forest

- Location within Pennsylvania
- Type: State park
- Location: Bedford, Franklin, Fulton counties
- Coordinates: 39°49′55″N 78°32′54″W
- Area: 71,683 acres (29,009 ha)
- Elevation: 2,484 feet (757 m)
- Created: between 1909 and 1930s
- Etymology: James Buchanan, 15th President of the United States
- Owner: Commonwealth of Pennsylvania
- Operator: Pennsylvania Department of Conservation and Natural Resources
- Open: Yes
- Camp sites: Yes - primitive
- Hiking trails: Yes
- Terrain: Various
- Website: www.dcnr.state.pa.us/forestry/stateforests/buchanan/index.htm

Buchanan State Forest is a Pennsylvania State Forest in Pennsylvania Bureau of Forestry District #2. The main office is located in McConnellsburg in Fulton County, Pennsylvania, in the United States. The forest also includes tracts in Franklin and Bedford Counties. It is named for James Buchanan of Pennsylvania, the fifteenth President of the United States.

The forest is found in the Ridge-and-Valley Appalachians of south-central Pennsylvania and comprises 71,683 acres (29,009 ha) divided into several units located in Bedford, Fulton, and Franklin Counties.

== History ==
Buchanan State Forest was formed as a direct result of the depletion of the forests of Pennsylvania that took place during the mid-to-late 19th century. Conservationists like Dr. Joseph Rothrock became concerned that the forests would not regrow if they were not managed properly. Lumber and Iron companies had harvested the old-growth forests for various reasons. The clear cut the forests and left behind nothing but dried tree tops and rotting stumps. The sparks of passing steam locomotives ignited wildfires that prevented the formation of second growth forests. The conservationists feared that the forest would never regrow if there was not a change in the philosophy of forest management. They called for the state to purchase land from the lumber and iron companies and the lumber and iron companies were more than willing to sell their land since that had depleted the natural resources of the forests. The changes began to take place in 1895 when Dr. Rothrock was appointed the first commissioner of the Pennsylvania Department of Forests and Waters, the forerunner of today's Pennsylvania Department of Conservation and Natural Resources. The Pennsylvania General Assembly passed a piece of legislation in 1897 that authorized the purchase of "unseated lands for forest reservations." This was the beginning of the State Forest system.

There are several areas of historical significance in and around Buchanan State Forest. The Forbes Road built during the French and Indian War by John Forbes passed through what is now Buchanan State Forest. Forbes built his road from Carlisle to Pittsburgh as a supply line for the British soldiers that were trying to capture Fort Duquesne. Remnants of the road are still visible in the state forest and are used by visiting hunters, hikers and mountain bikers. Cowans Gap State Park is located in an area that was one of the first to be settled in this part of Pennsylvania. British Major John Cowan and his wife Mary who migrated to the area just after the American Revolution. Buchanan's Birthplace State Park the location of President James Buchanan's birth and his boyhood home.

Buchanan State Forest was acquired by the Commonwealth of Pennsylvania following the lumber era that swept through most of Pennsylvania during the mid-to-late 19th century. Vast stands of old growth forests were harvested by various lumber companies. These lumber companies left behind a "barren wasteland" of stumps and drying treetops that were vulnerable to fire. The sparks cast off by passing steam trains set off massive forest fires. These fires slowed the development of the second growth forest that now covers Buchanan State Forest. The forests have largely regrown with the hemlock and white pine trees being replaced with thriving populations of various hardwood trees, thanks in large part to the efforts of the young men of the Civilian Conservation Corps during the Great Depression.

CCC Camp No. S-52 was built in 1933 on Sideling Hill near Oregon Creek. The young men of the CCC cleared the forest and stream beds of dried underbrush and built many of the forest roads and trails that are in Buchanan State Forest. This camp is now known as Oregon Ranger Station. It also served as quarters for conscientious objectors during World War II and was later turned into a Prisoner of War camp for German prisoners in 1944.

An abandoned aqueduct is hidden in Woodrige Hollow in Buchanan State Forest. It was constructed by several hundred stonemasons who were brought to Pennsylvania from Sicily by a railroad company in the 1880s. The aqueduct was completed in 1884 or 1885. It was constructed of native sandstone and measures 15 feet high, 10 feet wide and is 199 feet in length. It was meant to carry water from Woodridge Run beneath the South Penn Railroad that was being built across the northern portions of Fulton County through tunnels in Sideling and Rays Hills. The project was never completed, but much of the land cleared and the tunnels built by the railroad company was later used by the Pennsylvania Turnpike.

Sideling Hill Tunnel is one of three original Pennsylvania Turnpike tunnels which were abandoned (this one in 1968) after two massive realignment projects. It is now surrounded by Buchanan State Forest. Sideling Hill Tunnel is 6,782 feet (2,067 m) long. It was the longest of the original tunnels on Pennsylvania Turnpike. Alongside the Rays Hill Tunnel, the Sideling Hill Tunnel is now part of the Pike2Bike Trail. Together, the two tunnels as well as the roadway are commonly known as the Abandoned Pennsylvania Turnpike.

== Natural and wild areas ==
- Sweet Root Natural Area
- Martin Hill Wild Area

== Nearby state parks ==
- Cowans Gap State Park is located in Fulton and Franklin Counties within Buchanan State Forest.
- Buchanan's Birthplace State Park (Franklin County)
- Shawnee State Park (Bedford County)
- Warriors Path State Park (Bedford County)

== Neighboring state forest districts ==
- Rothrock State Forest (north)
- Tuscarora State Forest (northeast)
- Michaux State Forest (east)
- Forbes State Forest (west)
- Gallitzin State Forest (northwest)
