= Sideling Hill =

Mountain ridge in the Appalachian Mountains, U.S.

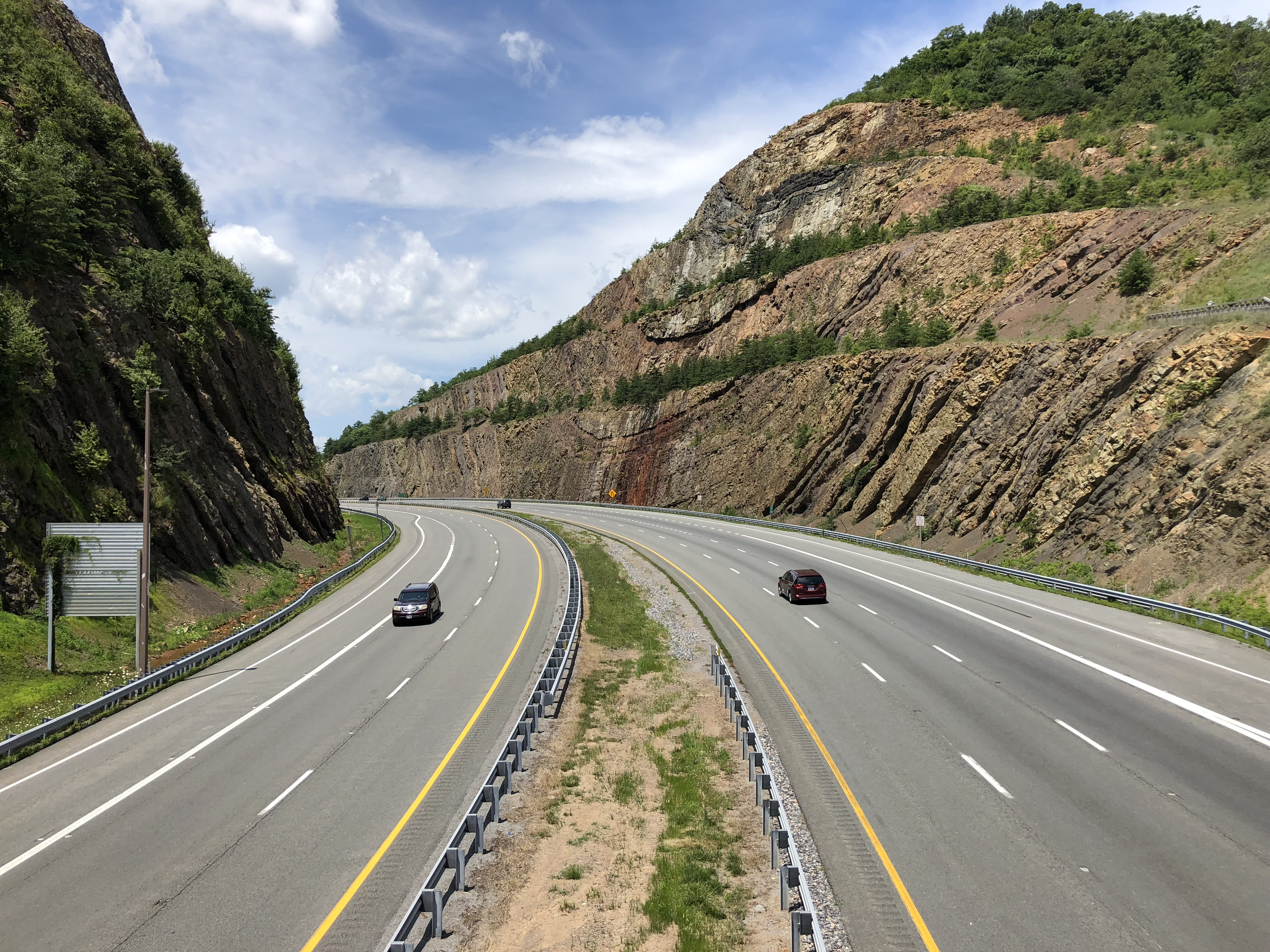
- Interstate 68 road cut in Sideling Hill in Western Maryland

Highest point
- Elevation: 2,311 ft (704 m)
- Prominence: 280
- Coordinates: 40.0090°N 78.1295°W at Fisher Point

Geography
- Location: West Virginia, Maryland, and Pennsylvania, U.S.
- Parent range: Ridge-and-Valley province, Appalachian Mountains
- Topo map: USGS Wells Tannery

Sideling Hill, also Side Long Hill, is a long, steep, narrow mountain ridge in the Ridge-and-Valley (or Allegheny Mountains) physiographic province of the Appalachian Mountains, located in Washington County in western Maryland and adjacent West Virginia and Pennsylvania, United States. The highest point on the ridge is Fisher Point, at 2,310 feet (700 m) in Fulton County, Pennsylvania.

== Geology ==
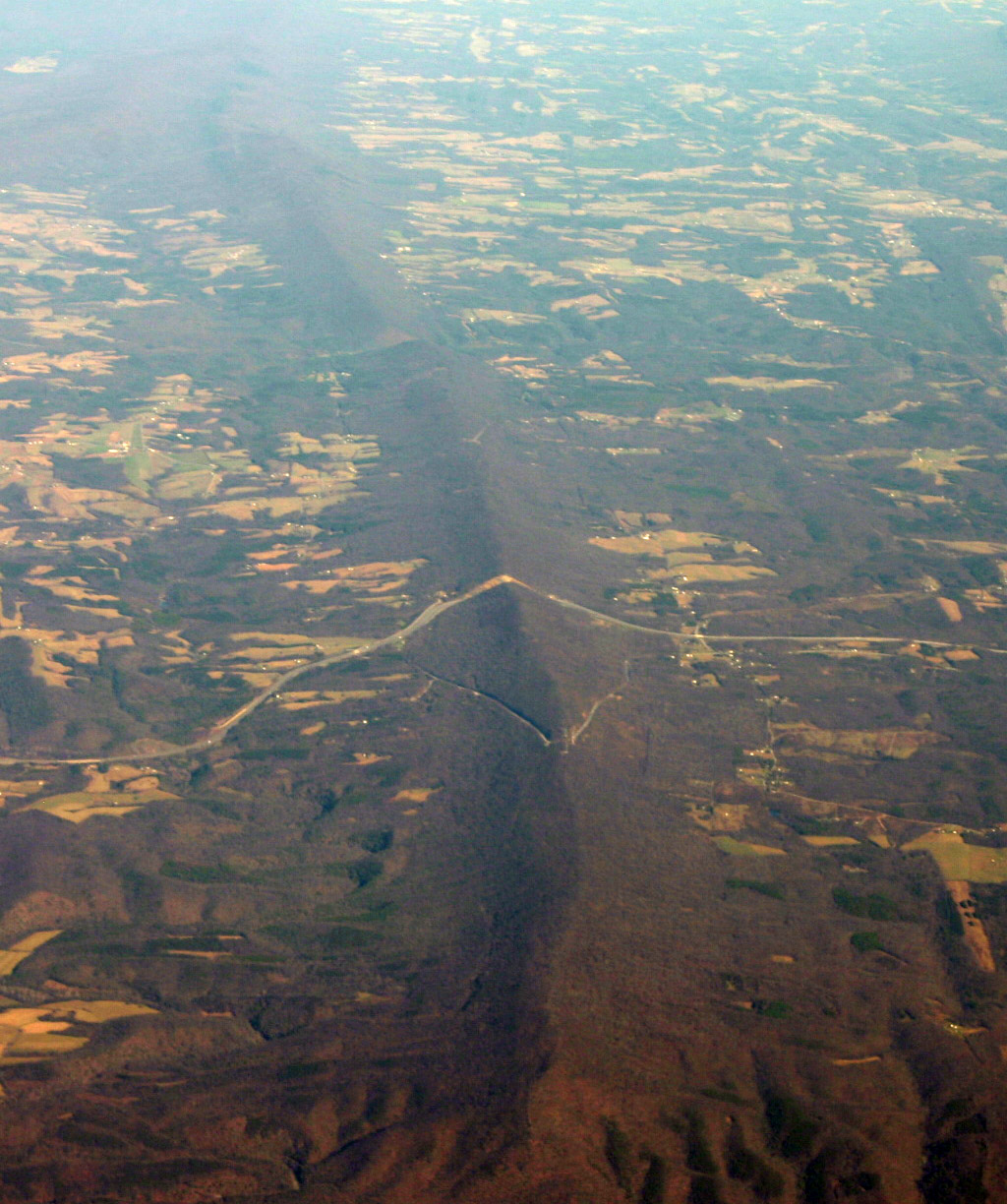
Oblique air photo of Sideling Hill, facing north, with the I-68 road cut near center, and the path of the National Road (Scenic US 40) visible to the south

Sideling Hill is a syncline mountain, in a region of downward-folded (synclinal) rock strata between two upfolded anticlines. The ridge is capped by an erosion-resistant conglomerate and sandstone of Mississippian (early Carboniferous) geologic age, the Purslane Sandstone of the Pocono Formation. The ridge's slopes are formed of much more easily eroded kinds of rock, including the Devonian-Mississippian Rockwell Formation, with long, narrow valleys paralleling the ridge on either side.

== Ecology ==
Most of the crest of Sideling Hill is forested, primarily with various deciduous tree species such as oaks (Quercus) and hickories (Carya), along with occasional evergreen pines (Pinus).

== Highway, railroad, and canal crossings ==
Only a few major highways, one active railroad and two former ones, and one former canal cross this steep mountain ridge.

=== East Broad Top Railroad Tunnel (Pennsylvania) ===
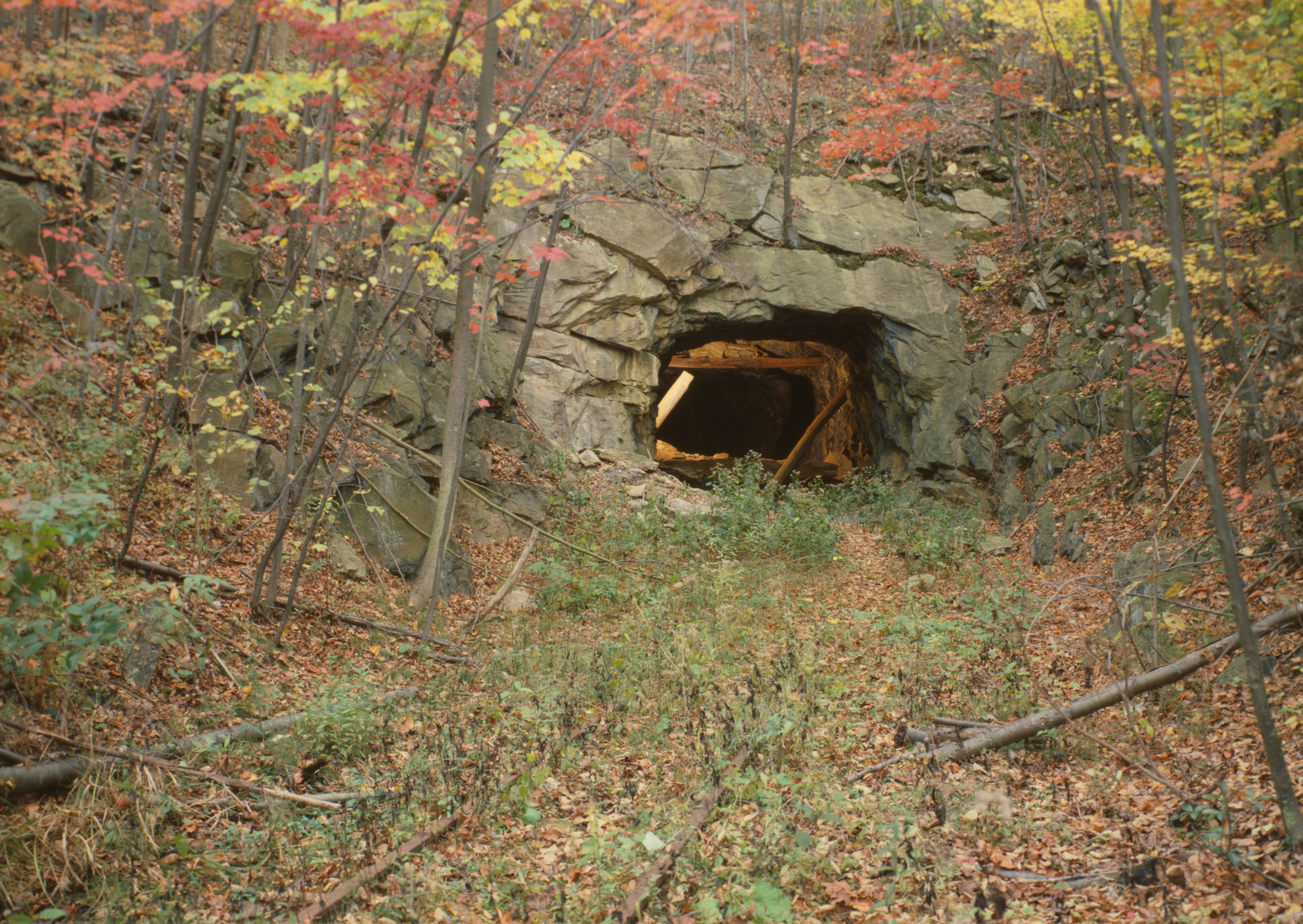
East Broad Top Railroad Tunnel at Sideling Hill, south portal

The East Broad Top Railroad constructed a tunnel through Sideling Hill in 1873–1874 as part of its mainline construction. The tunnel predates the South Pennsylvania Railroad tunnel construction 11 miles (18 km) to the south by eight years. The tunnel is single-tracked, and curved at each end. It originally had a stone portal on its eastern (RR North) end and a natural stone portal at its western (RR South) end, but about 1919 the north portal was replaced with a concrete one.

The north portal was equipped with doors to prevent wind from blowing through the tunnel as the wind caused water percolating into the tunnel to freeze on the tracks in the winter. In 1911, this ice caused the brand new locomotive #12 to derail its pilot axle inside the tunnel then derail the entire locomotive at the Kimmel switch just beyond the tunnel. In the 1940s, the doors were equipped with remote actuators mounted on poles a few hundred feet before each portal. This allowed the crews to open and close the doors without stopping. The system did not work flawlessly and a door was ripped off by a caboose cupola.

The tunnel was in service from 1874 until the railroad ceased operations in 1956. The line is technically out of service (but not abandoned), and the track is still in place through the tunnel, although not serviceable. The tunnel and rail line are private property and not open to the public.

=== Pennsylvania Turnpike (I-76) ===
The Pennsylvania Turnpike (Interstate 76, I-76) crosses Sideling Hill east of Breezewood, Pennsylvania, bypassing the two-lane Sideling Hill Tunnel and the nearby Rays Hill Tunnel that were formerly used by the Turnpike. Completed at a cost of $17,203,000, the Sideling Hill bypass opened on November 26, 1968, and the former alignment through the tunnels became known as the Abandoned Pennsylvania Turnpike. A rest area next to the ridge was a stop on Bill Clinton and Al Gore's post-convention bus tour in 1992.

=== Sideling Hill Tunnel (Pennsylvania) ===
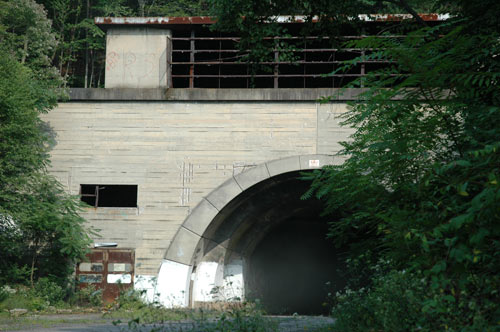
The western portal of the now-abandoned Sideling Hill Tunnel, along the former mainline of the Pennsylvania Turnpike

The Sideling Hill Tunnel, through Sideling Hill in Pennsylvania east of Breezewood, is currently in its third phase of life. In the 1880s, a tunnel was partially bored through the mountain by the South Pennsylvania Railroad. The railroad project ceased, and the tunnel was left abandoned. When construction of the Pennsylvania Turnpike was begun in the 1930s by the Pennsylvania Turnpike Commission on the right-of-way of the South Pennsylvania Railroad, the tunnel was completed for highway use by the turnpike.

The tunnel, the longest of the seven original turnpike tunnels at 6,782 feet (2,067 m) long, was used from the turnpike's opening in 1940 until 1968. Due to increasing traffic on the highway, the turnpike commission began upgrading all of its two-lane tunnels, constructing twin bores for its tunnels through the Allegheny, Tuscarora, Kittatinny, and Blue mountains, and bypassing the tunnels under Laurel Hill, Rays Hill, and Sideling Hill with new, six-lane highways climbing the adjacent hills. The Sideling Hill Tunnel and the nearby Rays Hill tunnel, along with connecting segments of four-lane highway, were used for many years as a testing facility for new highway technologies.

In 2001, the Sideling Hill Tunnel was sold for $1 to the Southern Alleghenies Conservancy, which now operates it as a bike trail.

=== Sideling Hill Road Cut (I-68 and US 40, Maryland) ===
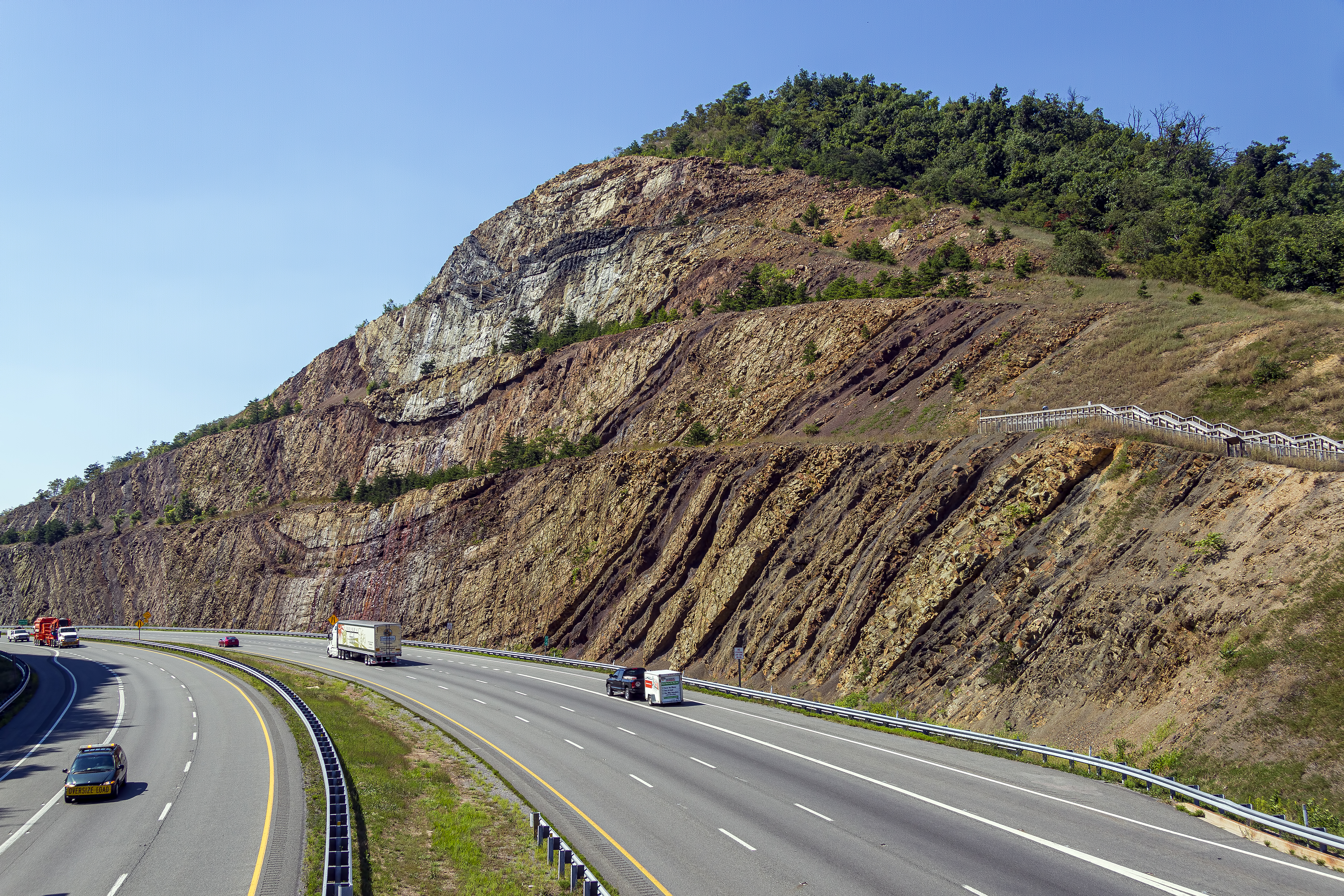
The Sideling Hill cut from the rest stop pedestrian bridge

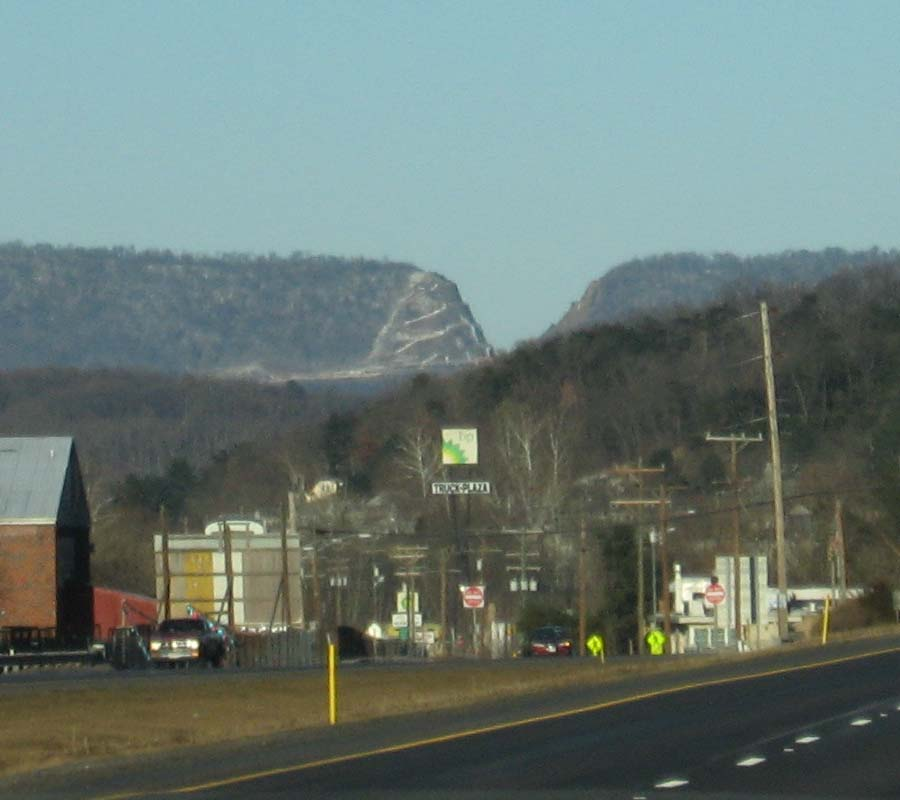
The Sideling Hill Road Cut, as seen from I-70

The Sideling Hill Road Cut on I-68 and US 40 is a 340-foot-deep (100 m) notch excavated from the ridge of Sideling Hill, about five miles (8.0 km) west of Hancock in Washington County, Maryland. Blasting was completed in August 1984. It is notable as an impressive man-made mountain pass, visible from miles away, and is considered to be one of the best rock exposures in Maryland and the entire northeastern United States. Almost 810 feet (250 m) of strata in a tightly folded syncline are exposed in this road cut. Although other exposures may surpass Sideling Hill in either thickness of exposed strata or in quality of geologic structure, few can equal its combination of both. The exposed rocks consist of the Devonian-Mississippian Rockwell Formation, underlying the Mississippian Purslane Sandstone.

==== Rest stop and former exhibit center ====
A highway rest stop, located near the eastern side of the Sideling Hill Road Cut on I-68 west of Hancock, includes a pedestrian bridge crossing I-68, connecting the eastbound and westbound rest areas and offering views of the cut, in which stopping is prohibited.

The rest stop formerly included the Sideling Hill Exhibit Center, a four-level geological museum and travel information center which opened in 1991. Due to state budget cuts, this facility was closed on August 15, 2009, as part of a $280 million budget reduction package, saving the state about $110,000 annually. Before its closing, the center served about 95,000 visitors a year. Many of the geological exhibits from the former Exhibit Center are now displayed at the Hancock Museum in nearby Hancock, Maryland.

The former exhibit center building was reopened as a welcome center on October 9, 2015. Only part of the facility is open, with the former exhibit center exhibits remaining at the Hancock Museum.

=== National Road (US 40 Scenic) ===
Before construction of I-68, US 40 (now US 40 Scenic), the National Road, crossed Sideling Hill with a steep grade on each side and a sharp hairpin turn at the crest of the mountain.

=== Potomac River Water Gap ===
The water gap cut through Sideling Hill by the Potomac River southwest (upstream) of Hancock, Maryland, provides a low-level crossing of the ridge for the CSX Railroad, formerly the main line of the Baltimore and Ohio (B&O) Railroad, on the southern (West Virginia) side of the river, and on the northern (Maryland) side, the former Chesapeake and Ohio Canal, now a national historical park, and the former Western Maryland Railroad (now a rail trail).

== See also ==
- Laurel Hill Tunnel
- Sideling Hill Creek (disambiguation)
