= Sideling =

Sideling may refer to:

In the United States:

- Sideling Hill, part of the Allegheny Mountains
- Sideling Hill Creek (Aughwick Creek), a tributary of Aughwick Creek
- Sideling Hill Creek (Potomac River), a tributary of the Potomac River
- Sideling Hill Tunnel, one of three original Pennsylvania Turnpike tunnels
- Sideling Hill Wildlife Management Area, Maryland
- Sideling Lock, one of several Locks on the C&O Canal

In Australia:

- Sideling Range, Tasmania
- Narangba railway station, Brisbane, previously known as Sideling Creek Station

Other:

- SS Sideling Hill, a ship
- Sideling, a geologic feature
