= Laurel Hill Tunnel =

Abandoned tunnel in Pennsylvania, United States

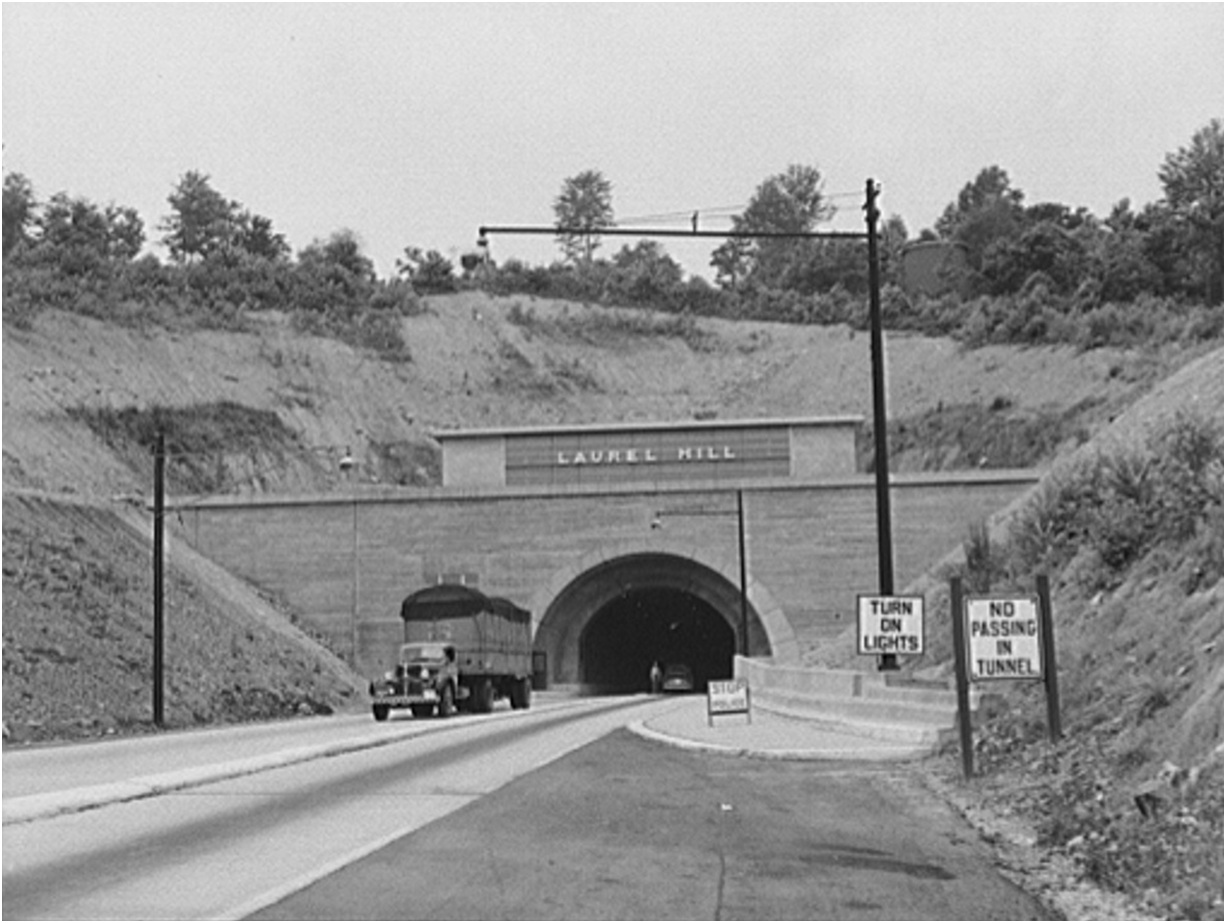
- Laurel Hill Tunnel in 1942
- Interactive map of Laurel Hill Tunnel

Overview
- Line: South Penn abandoned
- Location: Laurel Hill; Westmoreland and Somerset counties, Pennsylvania
- Coordinates: 40°6′0.4″N 79°13′38.4″W
- Status: Closed to traffic, leased to Chip Ganassi Racing for testing
- Crosses: Laurel Hill

Operation
- Work began: 1881, railway 1938, highway
- Constructed: 1881–1885, railway 1938–1940, highway
- Opened: October 1, 1940
- Closed: October 30, 1964, I-70/I-76 (aged 24 years)
- Owner: Pennsylvania Turnpike Commission

Technical
- Length: 5,450 ft (1,660 m), railway 4,541 ft (1,384 m), highway
- No. of lanes: 2

Laurel Hill Tunnel is a 4,541-foot-long (1,384 m) tunnel on the Pennsylvania Turnpike that was bypassed and abandoned in 1964. It is bored through Laurel Ridge, spanning the border of Westmoreland and Somerset counties. Its western portal may be seen from the eastbound side of the Turnpike at milepost 99.3.

The tunnel was built for the never-completed South Pennsylvania Railroad, as were two other tunnels to its east—Sideling Hill and Rays Hill—that were similarly on the original Turnpike and abandoned after being bypassed.

== Bypass ==
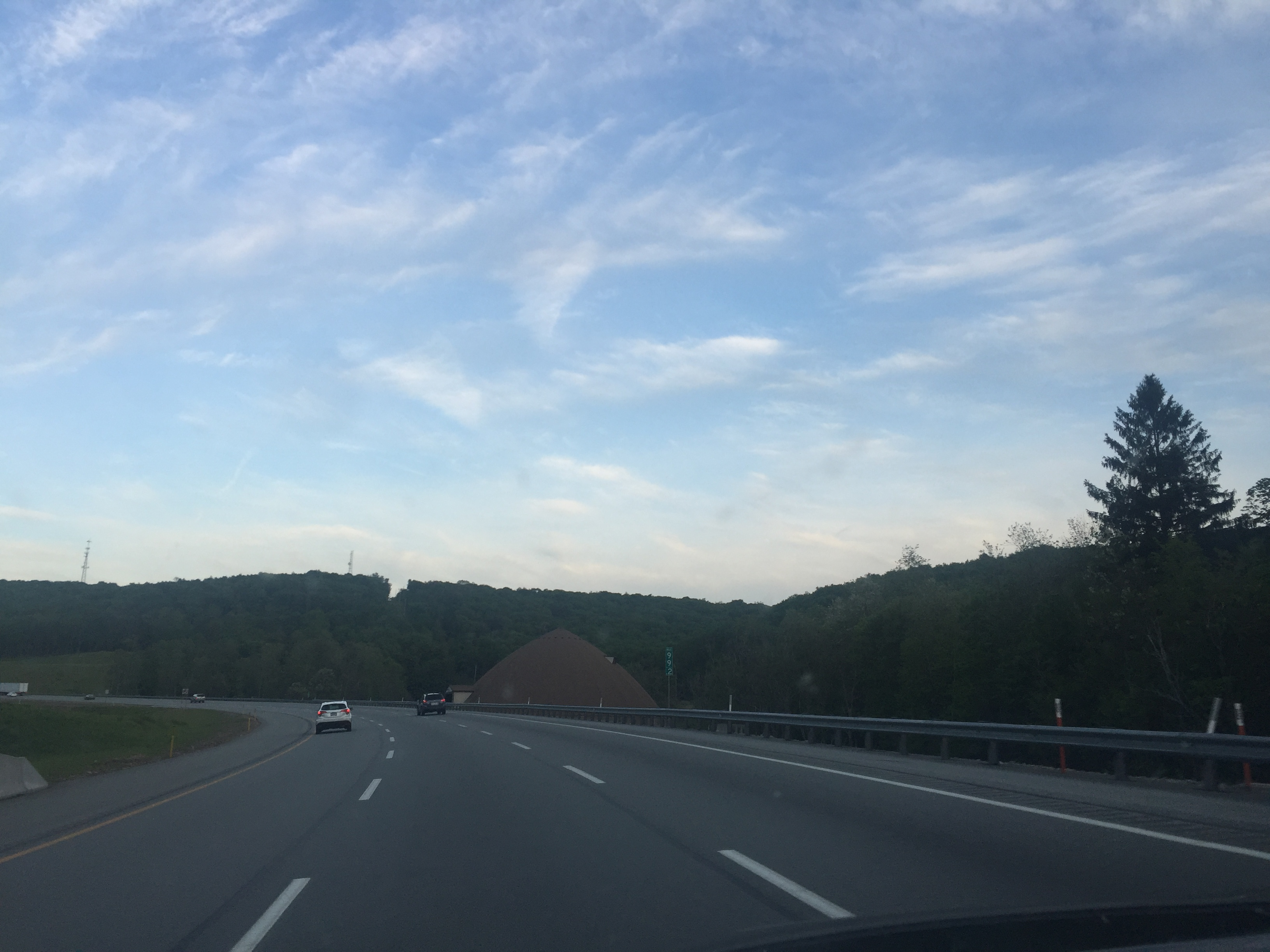
The point eastbound where the turnpike curves north (to the left) to bypass the Laurel Hill Tunnel. The abandoned tunnel can be seen where there is a path of trees removed from the top of the mountain. Notice the jersey barriers end with the beginning of a wide grassy median.

The tunnels on the Turnpike had been bottlenecks ever since the Turnpike's opening in 1940 due to reduced speeds and two-way traffic in a single tube. A second tube was added to four tunnels—Allegheny Mountain, Tuscarora Mountain, Kittatinny Mountain, and Blue Mountain—where it was the less expensive option.

Unlike the Sideling Hill and Rays Hill tunnels, the Laurel Hill Tunnel is not on the bypassed section commonly known as the Abandoned Pennsylvania Turnpike and is still owned by the Pennsylvania Turnpike Commission. It is not open to the public and is routinely patrolled by the Pennsylvania State Police for trespassers.

The highest point on the Turnpike, 2,603 feet (793 m), is on the Laurel Hill Tunnel bypass at milepost 100.45 in Somerset County.

== Testing use ==
The tunnel is used by Chip Ganassi Racing for high-speed race car aerodynamic testing. The tunnel has been repaved, equipped with climate control, safety equipment, and data collection systems. The tunnel was first used for testing in 2004 to develop the G-Force Indycar.

== See also ==
- Catesby Tunnel
