= Sideling Hill Tunnel =

Abandoned highway tunnel in Pennsylvania, United States of America

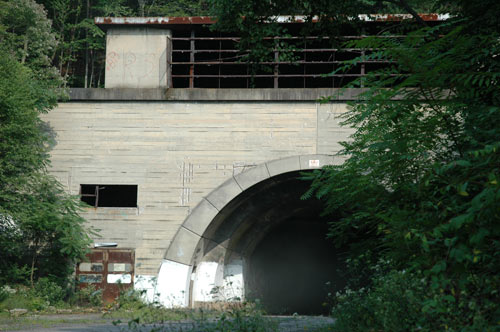
- West portal
- Interactive map of Sideling Hill Tunnel

Overview
- Line: South Pennsylvania Railroad abandoned
- Location: Blueridge Mountain; Fulton County, Pennsylvania, US
- Coordinates: 40.048056°N 78.129167°W
- Status: Abandoned Pennsylvania Turnpike; Currently Pike2Bike Trail
- Crosses: Sideling Hill

Operation
- Work began: 1881 (South Pennsylvania Railroad); 1938 (Pennsylvania Turnpike)
- Constructed: 1881–1885 (South Pennsylvania Railroad); 1938–1940 (Pennsylvania Turnpike)
- Opened: October 1, 1940
- Closed: November 26, 1968, I-76 (aged 28 years)
- Owner: South Pennsylvania Railroad abandoned Pennsylvania Turnpike Commission abandoned Pike2Bike Trail
- Character: Hiking, biking and skateboard trail (rail trail)

Technical
- Length: 6,662 ft (2,031 m) (South Pennsylvania Railroad); 6,782 feet (2,067 m) (Pennsylvania Turnpike)
- No. of lanes: 2
- Min elevation: 1,277 ft (389 m)

Sideling Hill Tunnel is an abandoned tunnel, formerly part of the Pennsylvania Turnpike.

Sideling Hill Tunnel is 6,782 feet (2,067 m) long. It was the longest of the original tunnels on the Pennsylvania Turnpike. The Ray's Hill Tunnel and Sideling Hill Tunnel are now part of the Pike2Bike Trail. Together, the two tunnels as well as the roadway are commonly known as the Abandoned Pennsylvania Turnpike.

From the Turnpike's opening in 1940 until the realignment projects, the tunnels were bottlenecks; opposing traffic in the same tubes reduced speeds. Four other tunnels on the Turnpike – Allegheny Mountain, Tuscarora Mountain, Kittatinny Mountain, and Blue Mountain – each had a second tube bored, the least expensive option.

All of the original tunnels except for the Allegheny Mountain Tunnel were part of "Vanderbilt's Folly", the never-completed South Pennsylvania Railroad.

This is not to be confused with an identically named tunnel several miles north built by the East Broad Top Railroad to connect Saltillo and Robertsdale.

== History ==
=== Construction ===
The Sideling Hill Tunnel's original plans date back to the year 1881, when surveying for the South Pennsylvania Railroad began. Construction began that year, with the plans for nine brand-new tunnels, most of which were drilled by 1885. The Sideling Hill Tunnel was built before December 1884 by John O'Brien, an engineer from Rhinebeck, New York. On July 6, 1885, a blast occurred at the end of the Sideling Hill Tunnel. The blast, which was caused by dynamite, claimed the lives of three people, including O'Brien. Several other people were injured in the blast.

Just sixteen days later, another blast occurred in the tunnel, taking the lives of a Hungarian worker, along with two African Americans, two Italians, and one Irishman. The bodies were so cut by the rocks during the blast, that the people were almost unidentifiable. Unfortunately William H. Vanderbilt, who had started the plans for the railroad, noticed that expenses began to inflate, and he began to look for a second way to work things out. The construction was abandoned and never finished.

In 1938, the Pennsylvania Turnpike Commission took over the entire grade of the abandoned railway.

The Pennsylvania Turnpike Commission started construction on a new toll highway from Carlisle, Pennsylvania to Irwin, Pennsylvania in 1938. When the Pennsylvania Turnpike opened on October 25, 1940, the Sideling Hill Tunnel was one of the seven original tunnels along the highway, six of which were built from the old railroad tunnels from the 1880s. The Allegheny Mountain Tunnel was constructed from scratch rather than from the tunnels because of structural concerns.

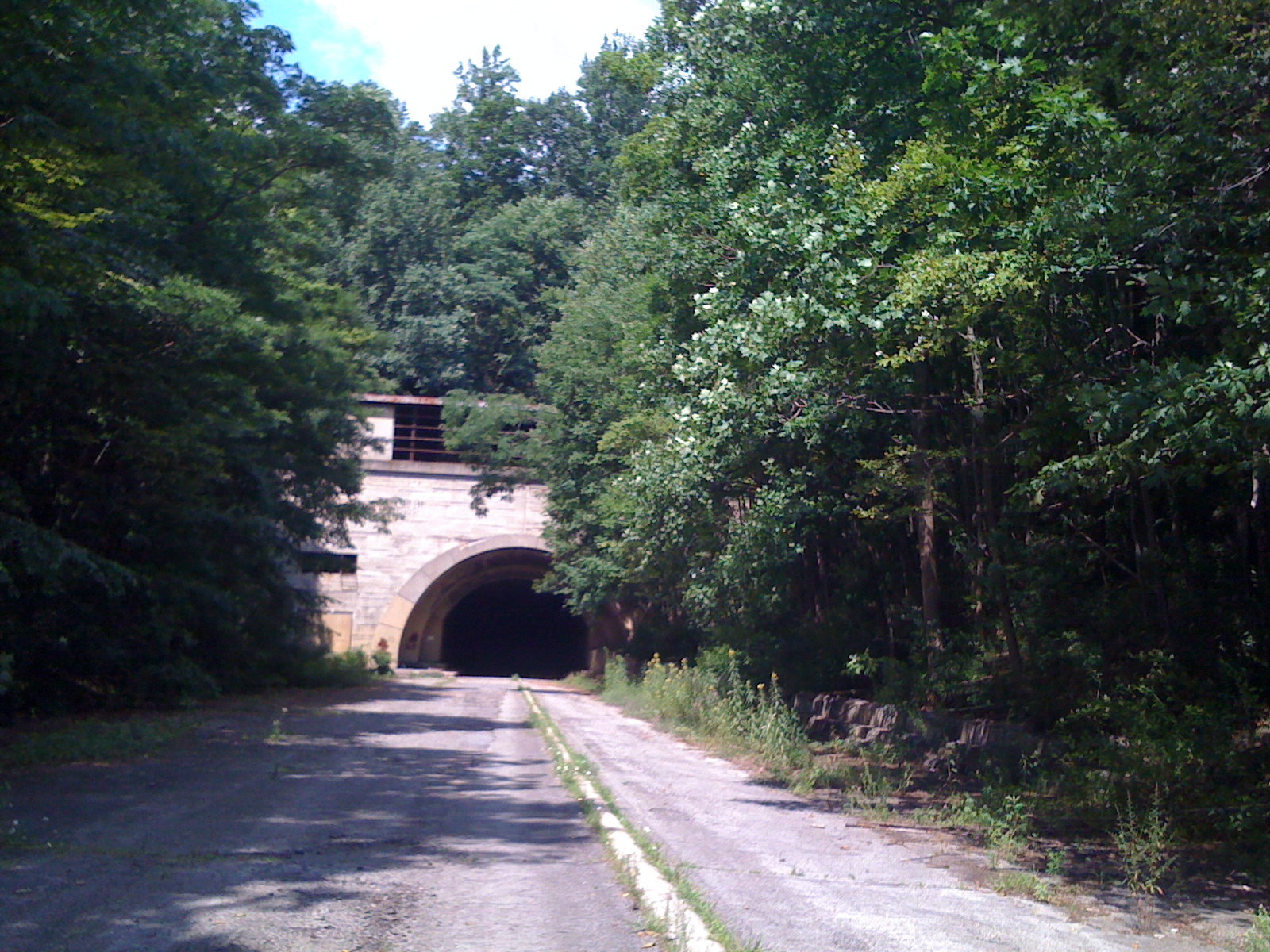
The eastern portal of the Sideling Hill Tunnel in 2009

Beginning in 1951, the eastbound traffic at the Laurel Hill Tunnel would back up during the summer weekends. By 1958, the Laurel Hill experienced congestion anytime from June to November. Because of the long bottlenecks, the Commission started looking into ways to remove the congestion. There were studies that began in the mid-1950s to decide on what to do with the tunnels. The studies looked into the major tunnels, the Laurel Hill and Allegheny Mountain, and the possibility of adding a second tube, or "twinning", to them.

=== Tunnel bypass actions ===
Studies were completed for the remaining five mainline tunnels to determine the cost benefit of twinning of the tunnels, or complete bypass. After the studies completed, the decision was made to go ahead with a US $100 million (Note: In 1962 the contract cost on average of $100 million. This is equivalent to $1.06 billion in 2025.) construction project to work with the tunnels. Construction began on September 6, 1962, with the first subproject being a bypass of the Laurel Hill Tunnel. On October 30, 1964, just two years after construction began, the Laurel Hill Bypass was completed and opened.

The Laurel Hill Tunnel was permanently closed on that day; however, this was not the last bypass to occur for tunnels along the turnpike. Two years after the closing of the Laurel Hill, the Allegheny Mountain became the first tunnel to be twinned, and opened on August 25, 1966. With the twinning of the Blue Mountain, Kittatinny Mountain and Tuscarora Mountain tunnels under construction, the Commission turned its focus to the remaining two mainline tunnels, the Rays Hill Tunnel (the shortest tunnel) and the Sideling Hill Tunnel (the longest tunnel).

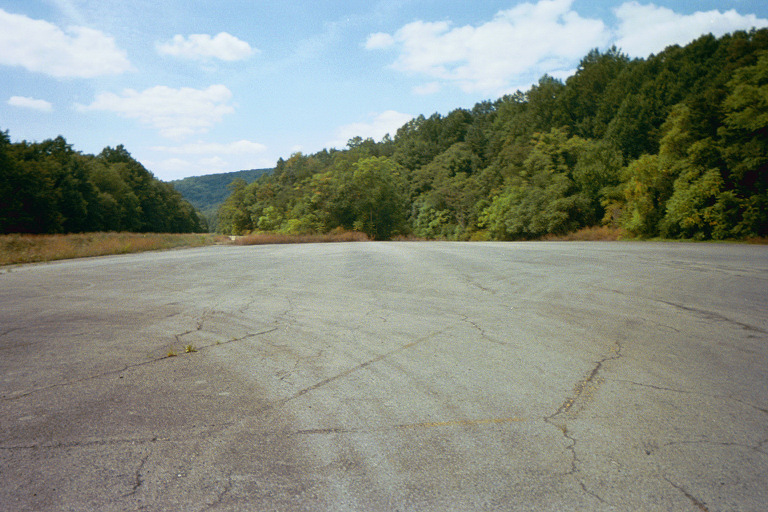
The site of the former Cove Valley Travel Plaza. The Sideling Hill Tunnel is about a half mile to the west

An engineering report dating back to 1961 suggested that building a bypass around the last two mainline tunnels was the best way to solve the congestion. The commission awarded three contracts to construct the bypass from July 1966 to March 1967. The contracts cost $17.2 million (Note: In 1966 the contract cost on average of $17.2 million. This is equivalent to $171 million in 2025.) for roadway and another $2.5 million (Note: In 1966 the contract cost on average of $2.5 million. This is equivalent to $24.8 million in 2025.) for construction of a new Sideling Hill Service Plaza to replace the Cove Valley Service Plaza, which was along the to-be-bypassed alignment. The $2.5 million project was to include ramps from both directions to the service plaza, so it could serve both directions. The style of the tunnel bypass was to follow the same style as the Laurel Hill bypass. On November 26, 1968, the three twinned tunnels opened, and the bypass of the Rays Hill and Sideling Hill Tunnels opened. The new bypass also opened the Breezewood Interchange and the number of lanes along the turnpike expanded to four (two in each direction) or five (two in each direction, plus a climbing lane going uphill).

In 2001, the Turnpike Commission gave control of the 13.5 miles (21.7 km) length of the Rays Hill and Sideling Hill Tunnels and other roadways to the Southern Alleghenies Conservancy, who began work to convert the stretch into a bicycle trail. The trail is used by hundreds of bicycle riders, and studies occurred in 2004 and 2005 to figure how to best safely construct the trail. Because there is a lack of good lighting in the tunnels the conservancy wants to look into how to solve it. The system is called the Pike2Bike Trail and is planned to be an 18 miles (29 km) mountain bicycle loop that serves access to the Pennsylvania Department of Transportation's BicyclePA Route S.

== See also ==
- Rail trail
- The Road (2009 film)
