= Breezewood, Pennsylvania =

Unincorporated town in Pennsylvania, United States

- Unincorporated town
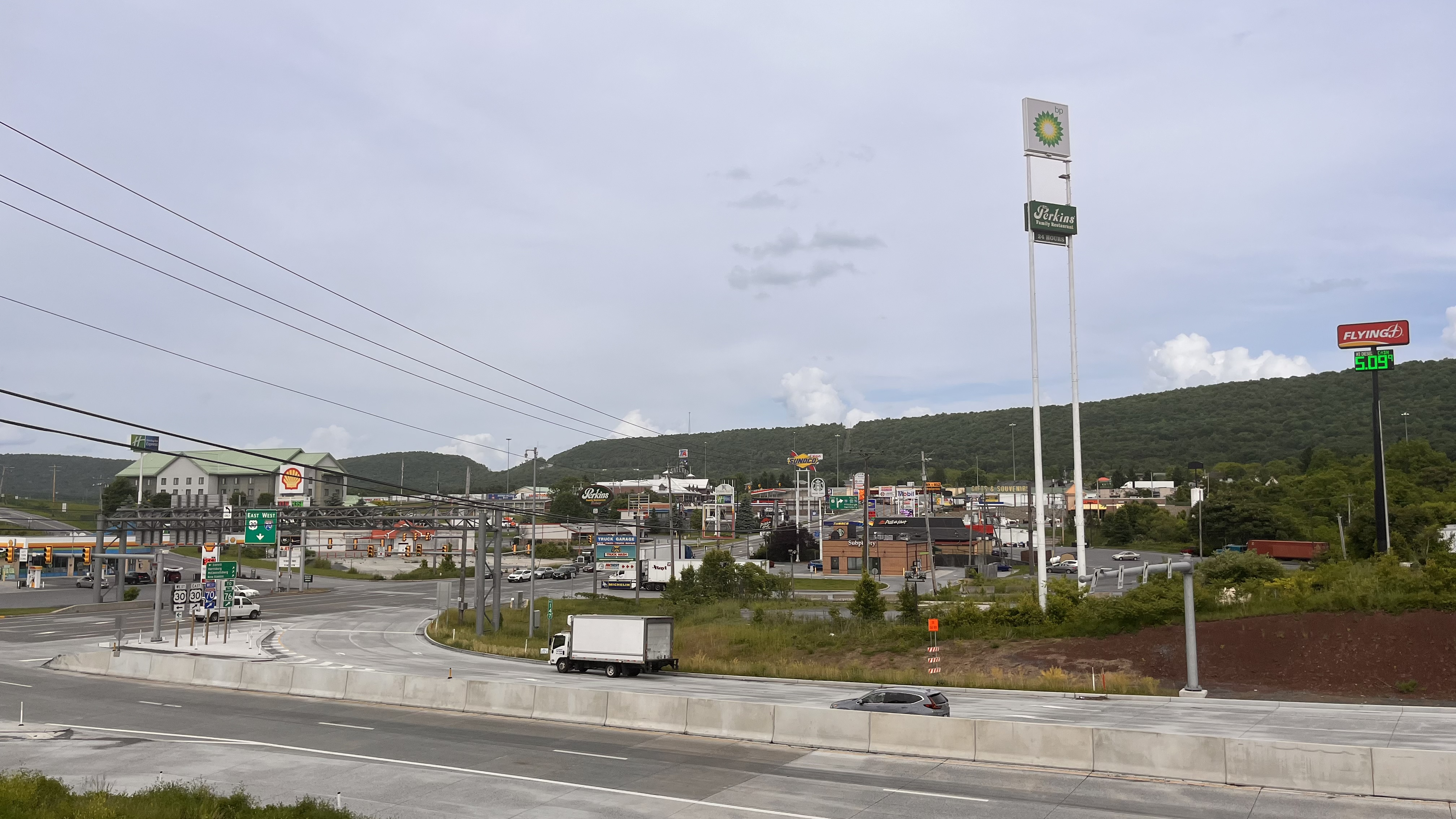
- The stretch of U.S. Route 30 in Breezewood, Pennsylvania (looking east), is one of the few gaps in the Interstate Highway System. Interstate 70 traffic uses this surface street to connect the untolled interstate highway with the Pennsylvania Turnpike.
- Interactive map of Breezewood, Pennsylvania
- Location within Pennsylvania Location within the United States
- Coordinates: 39°59′49″N 78°14′26″W
- Country: United States
- State: Pennsylvania
- County: Bedford
- Township: East Providence
- Time zone: UTC-5 (Eastern (EST))
  - Summer (DST): UTC-4 (EDT)
- ZIP codes: 15533
- Area code: 814
- GNIS feature ID: 1170190

Breezewood is an unincorporated town in East Providence Township, Bedford County, Pennsylvania, United States. Along a traditional pathway for Native Americans, European settlers, and British troops during colonial times, in the early 20th century, the small valley that became known as Breezewood was a popular stopping place for automobile travelers on the Lincoln Highway, beginning in 1913. It has about 200 residents.

In 1940, Breezewood was designated exit 6 on the just-opened Pennsylvania Turnpike. In the 1960s, Breezewood became the junction of the Turnpike and the new Interstate 70. Later renumbered exit 12, it is now exit 161 on the Turnpike following a change to mileage-based exit numbering. Breezewood has been labeled a "tourist trap" and choke point because traffic between I-70 to the south and the Turnpike, which carries I-70 westward from Breezewood, is routed along surface streets lined with gasoline stations, hotels, restaurants, and traffic lights, rather than directly via a freeway-to-freeway junction. This segment of I-70 is one of the few parts of the Interstate Highway System that is not a controlled-access highway. Greyhound Lines opened a bus facility in the town in 1964; it closed in 2004. In 2024, plans were announced for new construction so that the Breezewood interchange will allow avoiding the surface street connection and directly connect the turnpike and I-70.

== History ==
The community that became known as Breezewood has a long history of serving cross-country travelers.

=== Early history ===
Before the Europeans arrived, an old trail of the Native Americans crossed through there. Later, in colonial times before the American Revolutionary War (1776–1781) and the Conestoga wagons of the westbound settlers, a wagon road passed through. A British military trail was built in 1758 by General John Forbes from Chambersburg to Pittsburgh during the French and Indian War. It was later known as the Pittsburgh Road and the Conestoga Road. Through the tiny valley was built the Chambersburg-Bedford Turnpike, a private toll road that came later.

=== South Pennsylvania Railroad ===
Late in the 19th century, leaders of the New York Central Railroad (NYC) dreamed of building an east–west railroad across southern Pennsylvania through the Breezewood area to compete with the Pennsylvania Railroad (PRR). Over $10 million was spent and 26 lives lost when work on William H. Vanderbilt's planned South Pennsylvania Railroad project was halted in 1886. Control shifted to financier J.P. Morgan and PRR interests. The potentially competing South Pennsylvania Railroad was promptly abandoned and never completed, although much grading and tunneling work had been done.

=== Developing the community ===
A community called Rays Hill (or Nycumtown) was located just east of present-day Breezewood where a man named John Nycum had a small store. In 1836, he succeeded in establishing the Rays Hill Post Office and he served as the first Postmaster. The Rays Hill Post Office was the smallest in the country, at six feet by eight feet. On the western edge of Breezewood (or known as White Hall in the early 1800s), stands the Federal style mansion known as the Maple Lawn Inn (originally called Martin's Tavern), which opened around 1789. The 22-room building boasts 11 fireplaces, patriotic/masonic medallions, and was used as a stage coach stop and underground railroad safehouse, with a foundation several feet thick, and walls 3 to 4 bricks thick. It has been nominated to the National Register of Historic Places.

With the advent of the automobile, by the early 20th century, the area in a small valley between Rays Hill and the Maple Lawn Inn had become known locally as Breezewood. The name was applied to a repair garage built in 1937. Maps published around that time locate Breezewood as the collection of buildings at the intersection of U.S. Route 30/Lincoln Highway and Pennsylvania Route 126 (now North Main Street); Pennsylvania Department of Transportation maps still do.

=== 1913: Lincoln Highway, U.S. Route 30 ===
On July 1, 1913, American automotive pioneer Carl G. Fisher and other automobile enthusiasts and industry officials announced plans for the Lincoln Highway, the first transcontinental paved roadway in the United States to be created specifically for motorists. Former U.S. President Theodore Roosevelt and Thomas A. Edison, both friends of Fisher, sent checks, as well as then-current President Woodrow Wilson, who has been noted as the first U.S. president to make frequent use of an automobile for what was described as stress-relief relaxation rides.

In 1919, around the end of World War I, the U.S. Army undertook its first Transcontinental Motor Convoy. It followed the Lincoln Highway from Gettysburg, Pennsylvania, to San Francisco, California, passing through Breezewood. The trip demonstrated the potential military importance of such a roadway, as well as the need for consistency in both improvements and maintenance. One of the young Army officers was Dwight David Eisenhower, then a Lt. Colonel. The convoy was memorable enough for him to include a chapter on the trip entitled "Through Darkest America With Truck and Tank," in At Ease: Stories I Tell to Friends (Doubleday and Company, Inc., 1967). During World War II, then-General Eisenhower was also deeply impressed with the German autobahn roadway network. Those experiences combined to convince him the need to support construction of the Interstate Highway System when he became President of the United States in 1953. The portion of the Lincoln Highway from Philadelphia to Pittsburgh received the transcontinental U.S. Route 30 designation, which it still bears.

=== 1940: Pennsylvania Turnpike ===
When the Pennsylvania Turnpike was built in the 1930s, the tiny eastern Bedford County locality made sure it would be served by the new highway. Breezewood is at the original exit 6 of the Turnpike, which opened on October 1, 1940. The new turnpike used much of the earlier South Pennsylvania Railroad project for its right-of-way, grading, and tunnels.

Breezewood, with a faded sign proclaiming it the "Town of Motels" and the "Traveler's Oasis", boomed after the Pennsylvania Turnpike opened, with one gas station and the first traveler's stop, the Gateway Motel and Restaurant. Gateway remains open as of early 2025 as a truck stop affiliated with T/A, competing with other gas stations, hotels, restaurants, and a Flying J franchise.

=== 1960s: Connecting the Turnpike with the new I-70 ===
Abandoned Turnpike (red) in relation to Breezewood (at left)

Over 25 years later, when Interstate 70 was built through Pennsylvania, it was co-signed with the Pennsylvania Turnpike for 86 miles, between Breezewood and New Stanton. The I-70 section of the Turnpike included tunnels under the eastern continental divide of the Allegheny Mountains and Laurel Hill, crossing some of Pennsylvania's most rugged terrain. The Laurel Hill Tunnel was later abandoned.

About the same time as I-70 was built, in the early and mid-1960s, a major group of improvements was made to the original turnpike. These included roadway capacity improvement along the portion shared with I-70 at the two major mountains, where traffic had been reduced to two lanes in tunnels, and a realignment of the Breezewood exit and the turnpike to the east from there. This created the abandoned Pennsylvania Turnpike, which became a bicycle trail.

==== Unusual I-70 alignment ====
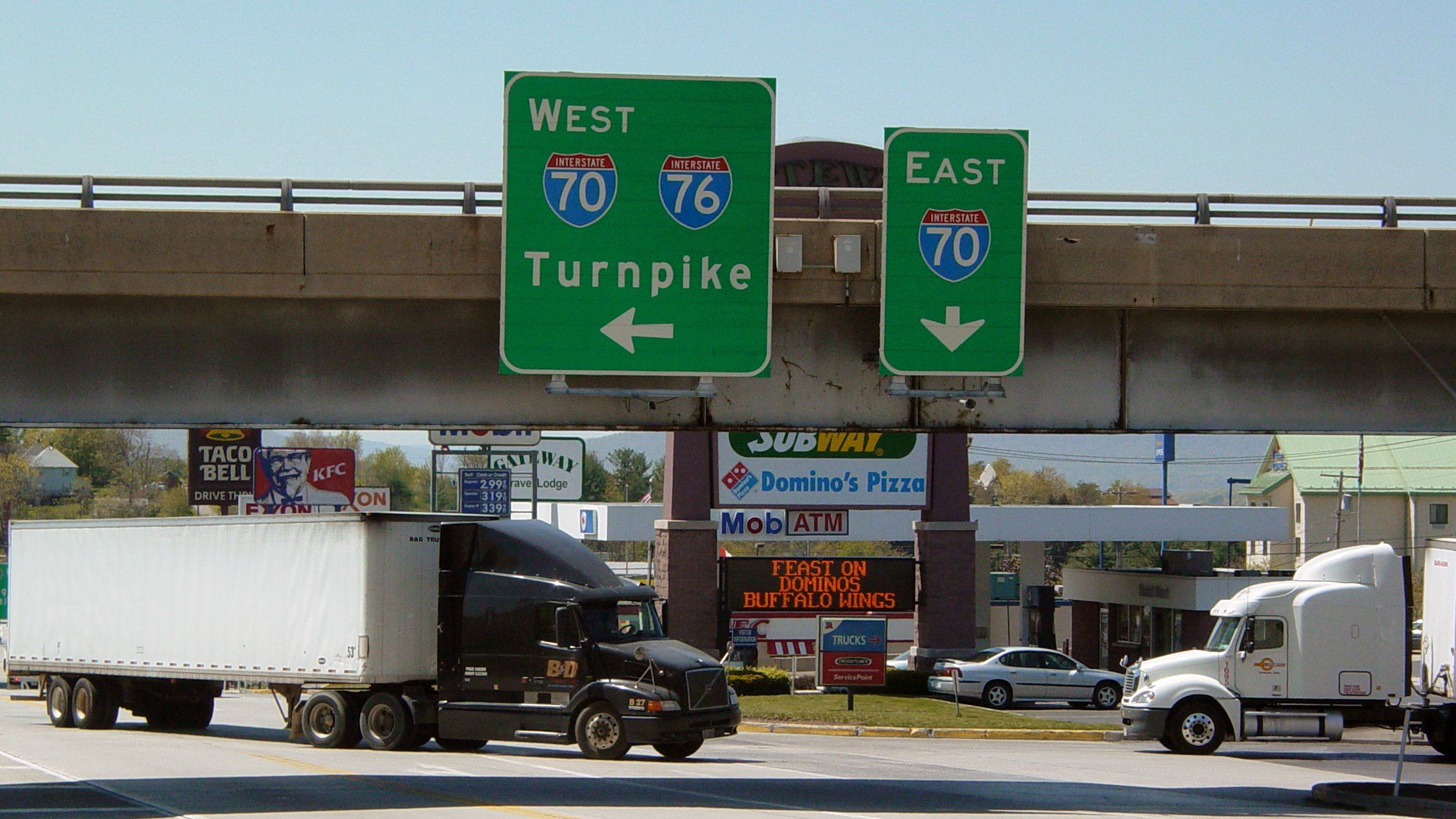
Turnpike access from Lincoln Highway (looking west)

I-70 traffic uses a surface road (part of US 30) with at-grade intersections to connect the freeway heading south to Hancock, Maryland with the ramp to the Pennsylvania Turnpike. According to the Federal Highway Administration, the peculiar arrangement at Breezewood resulted because at the time I-70's toll-free segment was built, the state did not qualify for federal funds under the Federal Aid Highway Act of 1956 to build a direct interchange, unless it agreed to cease collecting tolls on the Turnpike once the construction bonds were retired—a direct interchange would have meant that a westbound driver on I-70 could not choose between the toll route and a free alternative, but would be forced to enter the Turnpike. The Pennsylvania Turnpike Commission was not willing to build the interchange with its own funds, due to the expected decrease in revenue once I-80 was completed through the state. Accordingly, the state chose to build the unusual Breezewood arrangement in lieu of a direct interchange, thus qualifying for federal funds because this arrangement gave drivers the option of continuing on US 30 which was free of any tolls.

Although laws have been relaxed since then, local businesses, including many traveler services like fast food restaurants, gas stations and motels, have lobbied to keep the gap and not directly connect I-70 to the Turnpike, fearing a loss of business. In order for a bypass to be considered, Breezewood's own Bedford County must propose it through the State's highway project process. In practice, this is "just not an issue that really appears on the radar for us," Donald Schwartz, the Bedford County planning director, said in 2017.

The short stretch of I-70 through Breezewood is one of only two locations in the U.S. where there are traffic lights on a two-digit Interstate Highway (the other being I-78 in Jersey City, New Jersey between the Newark Bay Extension of the New Jersey Turnpike and the west portal of the Holland Tunnel). Former Pennsylvania State Senate President Pro Tempore Robert Jubelirer was not in favor of building a direct interchange between the two interstates.

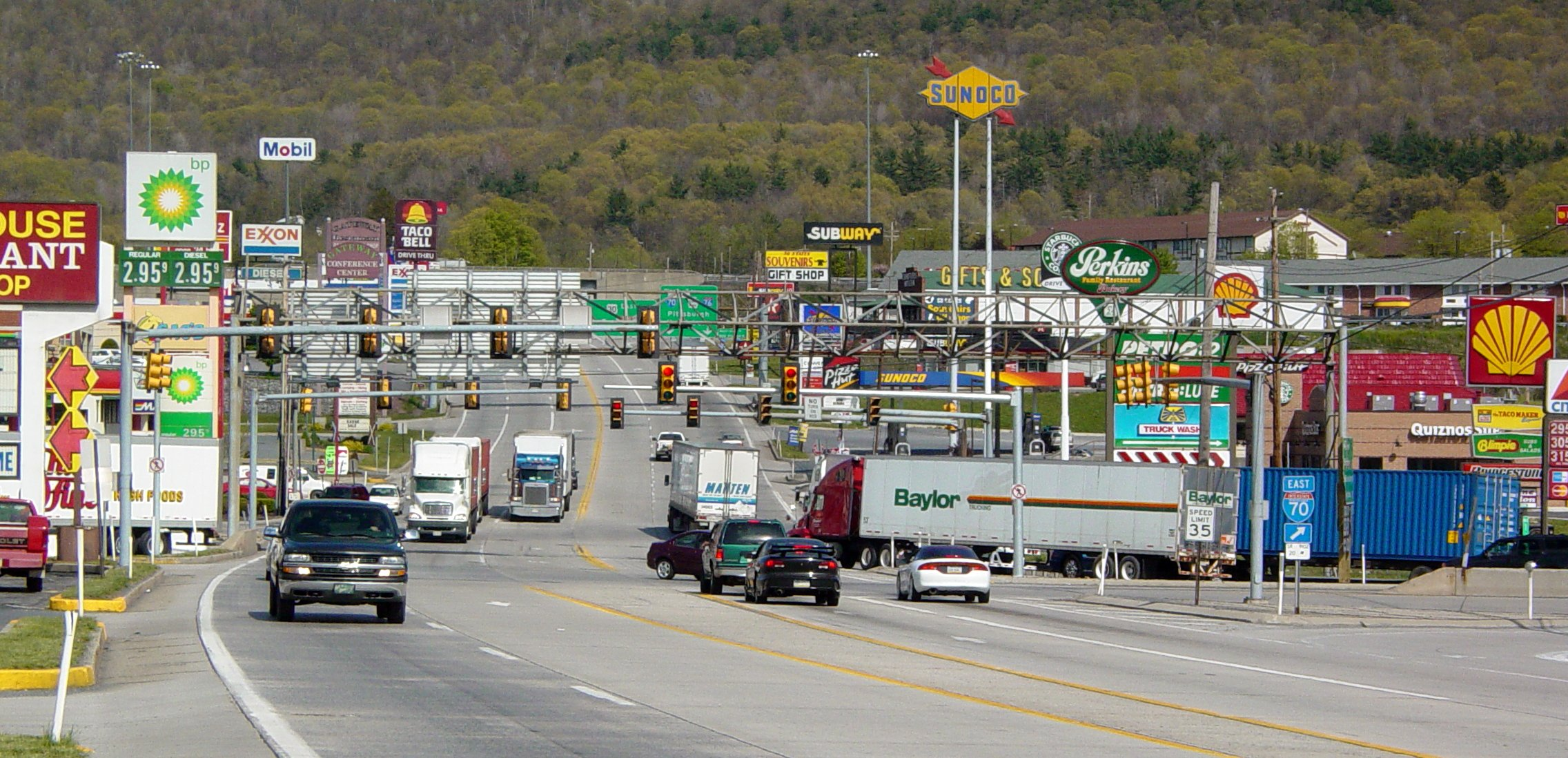
Breezewood in 2006 (looking east)

Despite this abnormality, this is not the only area where the Pennsylvania Turnpike has had an indirect interchange with an Interstate highway due to this funding quirk, although it is the only one where an Interstate highway has had to run onto a surface street. I-79 in Cranberry Township; I-81 near Carlisle; and I-95 in Bristol Township have had, for decades, no direct connection to the mainline Turnpike, with I-79 relying on U.S. Route 19 to get onto the Turnpike and vice versa, while I-81 has had to rely on U.S. Route 11 for Turnpike access and vice versa, and I-95 had no access to the Turnpike at all until 2018. (Interstate 99, which relies on U.S. Route 220 for Turnpike access near Bedford, was only designated in 1998.) While direct access between I-79 and the Turnpike was constructed in 2003 and another interchange to connect I-95 with the Turnpike opened in 2018, the indirect access in Carlisle remains.

In 2024, the Pennsylvania Turnpike Commission announced plans to redesign the Breezewood interchange to include a direct connection between the turnpike and I-70. In February 2025, it named a lead designer for the project.

==== Post House Cafeteria ====
Post House Cafeteria was a 2.2-acre (8,900 m^{2}) complex built in 1964 with a 48,800-square-foot (4,530 m^{2}) restaurant, arcade, and gift shop, with a separate bus station and garage for Greyhound Lines. Ten Greyhound buses stopped at the site daily. According to the Los Angeles Times, the restaurant was "one of a handful of independent restaurants still left in Breezewood." The facility was considered lifeless outside a twenty-minute period when it was served by the Red-Eye bus service. On September 20, 1990, the U.S. District Court found "reasonable cause" that unfair labor practices took place in Post House Cafeteria. It closed on June 27, 2004, because Aramark declined to renew the lease due to decline in tourism after the September 11 attacks.

== Tourist services and amenities ==
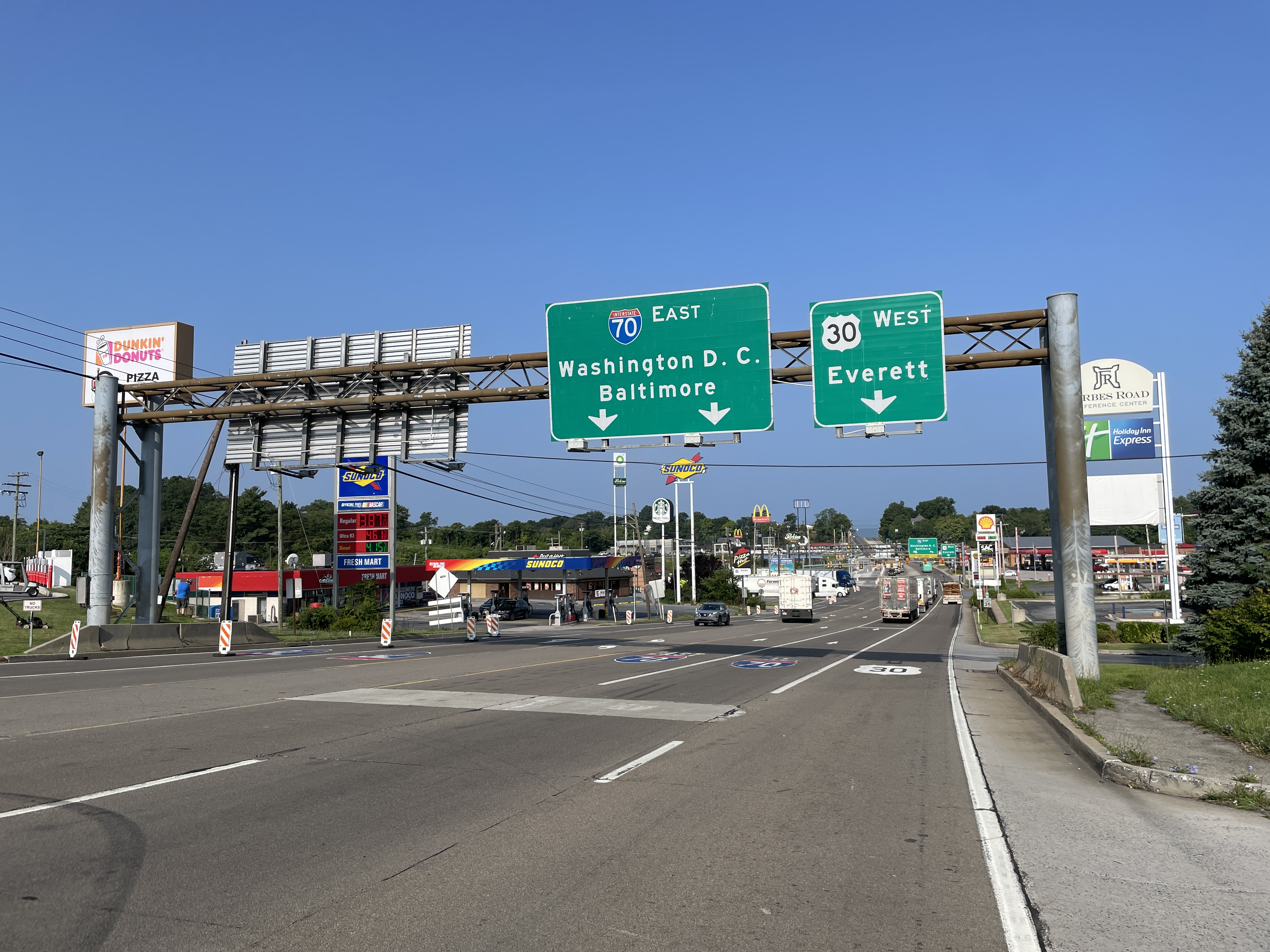
View to the west along the Lincoln Highway in Breezewood, with numerous businesses lining the road

Approximately 2.6 million vehicles exited the turnpike through Breezewood in 1995. By 2003, that figure had increased to 3.4 million. During high traffic periods, the arrangement can result in extended traffic jams on all three highways.

According to a 1990 article in The New York Times, Breezewood offered "no less than 10 motels, 14 fast-food restaurants and 7 fuel and service stations, including two sprawling truck stops." As of 1997 approximately 1,000 people were employed in Breezewood's commercial district.

Business Week stated in 1991 that Breezewood is "perhaps the purest example yet devised of the great American tourist trap...the Las Vegas of roadside strips, a blaze of neon in the middle of nowhere, a polyp on the nation's interstate highway system."

Since May 12, 2022, OurBus has served Breezewood with intercity bus service to New York City, Pittsburgh, and Philadelphia.

By 2024 many of the businesses in Breezewood had closed.

== Community ==
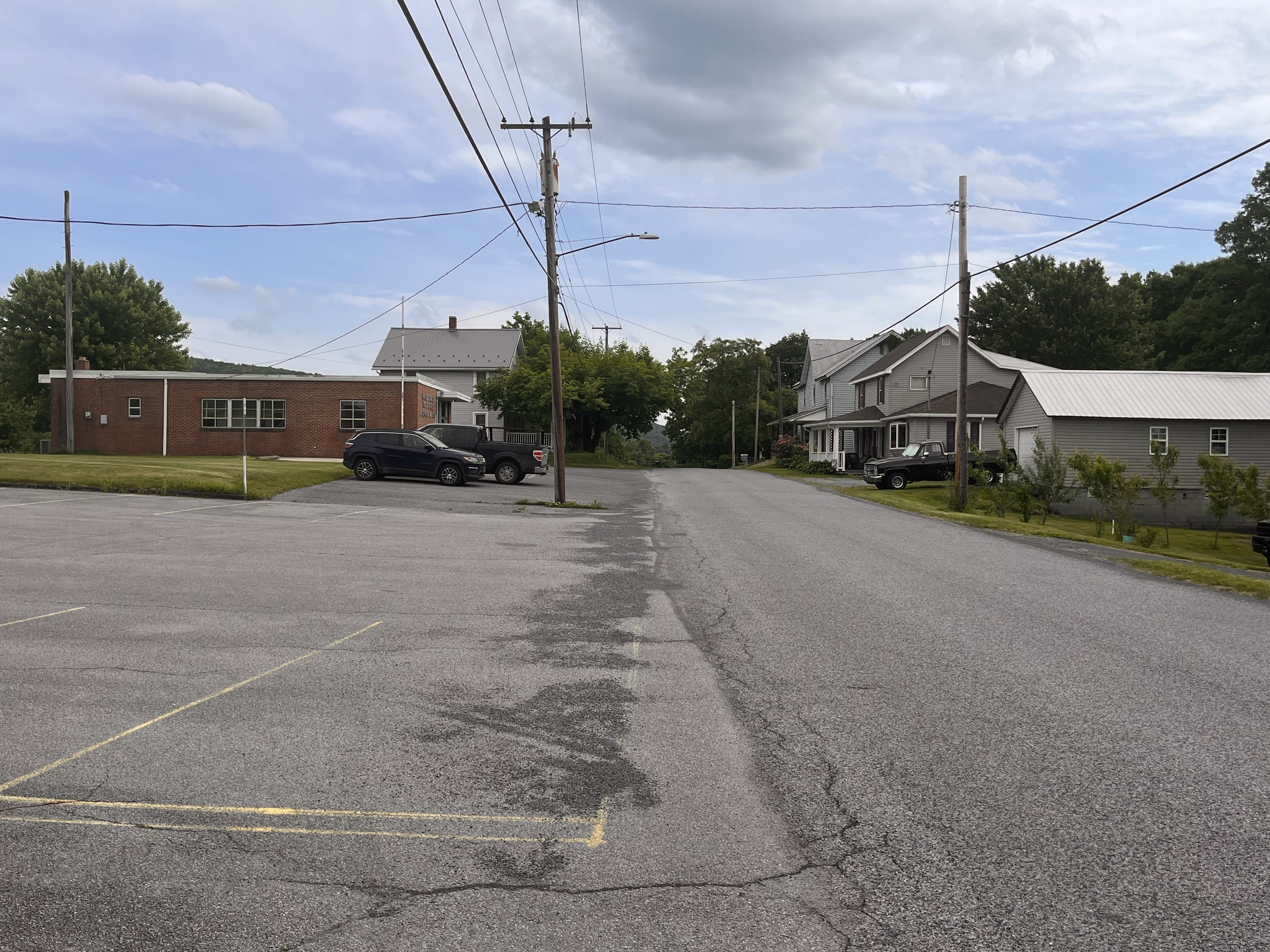
North Main Street, where most notable buildings in Breezewood outside of U.S. Route 30 are located, including the post office

The Breezewood community is not incorporated under Pennsylvania law and is treated as a portion of East Providence Township. Commerce in Breezewood was about 75 percent of East Providence Township's tax base in 1997.

The community has a post office that has been assigned the ZIP Code of 15533. Breezewood also has a fire station and East Providence Township Hall. The elementary school there closed in 2024.

There are few residences in the immediate area of Breezewood.

== Geography ==
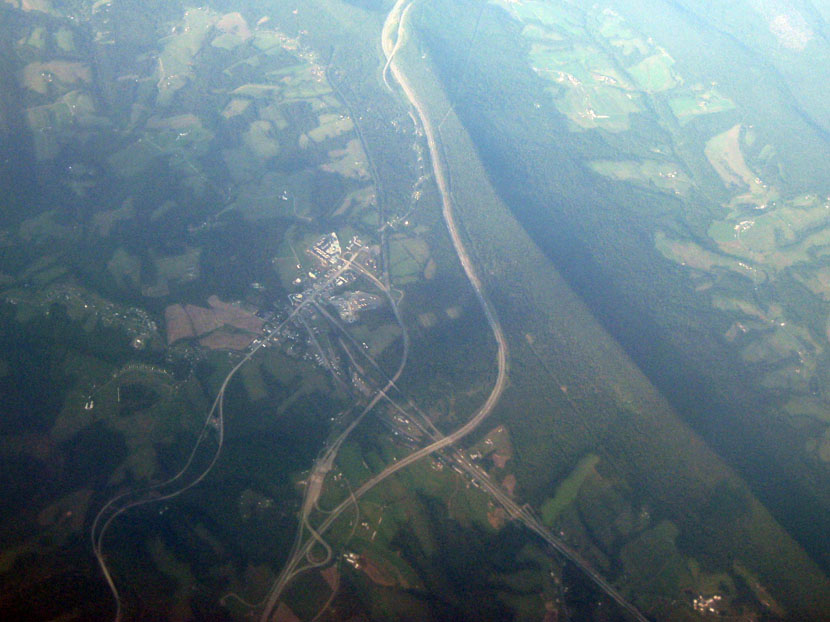
Oblique air photo of Breezewood and vicinity, facing northeast, and showing Interstate 70, the Pennsylvania Turnpike, U.S. Route 30, and Rays Hill. The Abandoned Pennsylvania Turnpike can also be seen paralleling the Turnpike northeast of Breezewood.

Breezewood is situated in the Ridge and Valley Physiographic Province of the Appalachian Mountains of Pennsylvania. It lies on the western edge of Rays Hill.

== See also ==
- List of gaps on Interstate Highways
- South of the Border (attraction) in South Carolina
- Wall Drug in South Dakota
