= Abandoned Pennsylvania Turnpike =

Bike trail and former alignment of the Pennsylvania Turnpike

- Length: 12.9 miles (20.8 km)
- Trailheads: Tannery Road, Breezewood; Pump Station Road, Fulton County; PA 915 Oregon Road, Wells Tannery
- Use: Hiking, biking, recreation
- Sights: Rays Hill Tunnel and Sideling Hill Tunnel

Trail map
- Publicly accessible portions in red, closed portions in gray, Rays Hill Tunnel in magenta, Sideling Hill Tunnel in dark magenta

The abandoned Pennsylvania Turnpike is the common name of a 13-mile (21 km) section of roadbed which was built and opened in 1940 to be a part of the Pennsylvania Turnpike and that was replaced in 1968 by a new alignment. This was done to eliminate traffic congestion caused by the two-lane Sideling Hill Tunnel and Rays Hill Tunnel. The Cove Valley travel plaza along this section was also demolished. The original 1940 and replacement 1968 alignments diverge eastbound at the heavily congested Breezewood Interchange (Exit 161) for Interstate 70 (I-70). The interchange was rebuilt two years after the new alignment opened. This section, like all of the original 160 miles of the turnpike that opened in 1940 was originally built for the South Pennsylvania Railroad which was never completed. The property is now officially named The Old PA Pike Trail.

== History ==
=== Opening and realignment ===
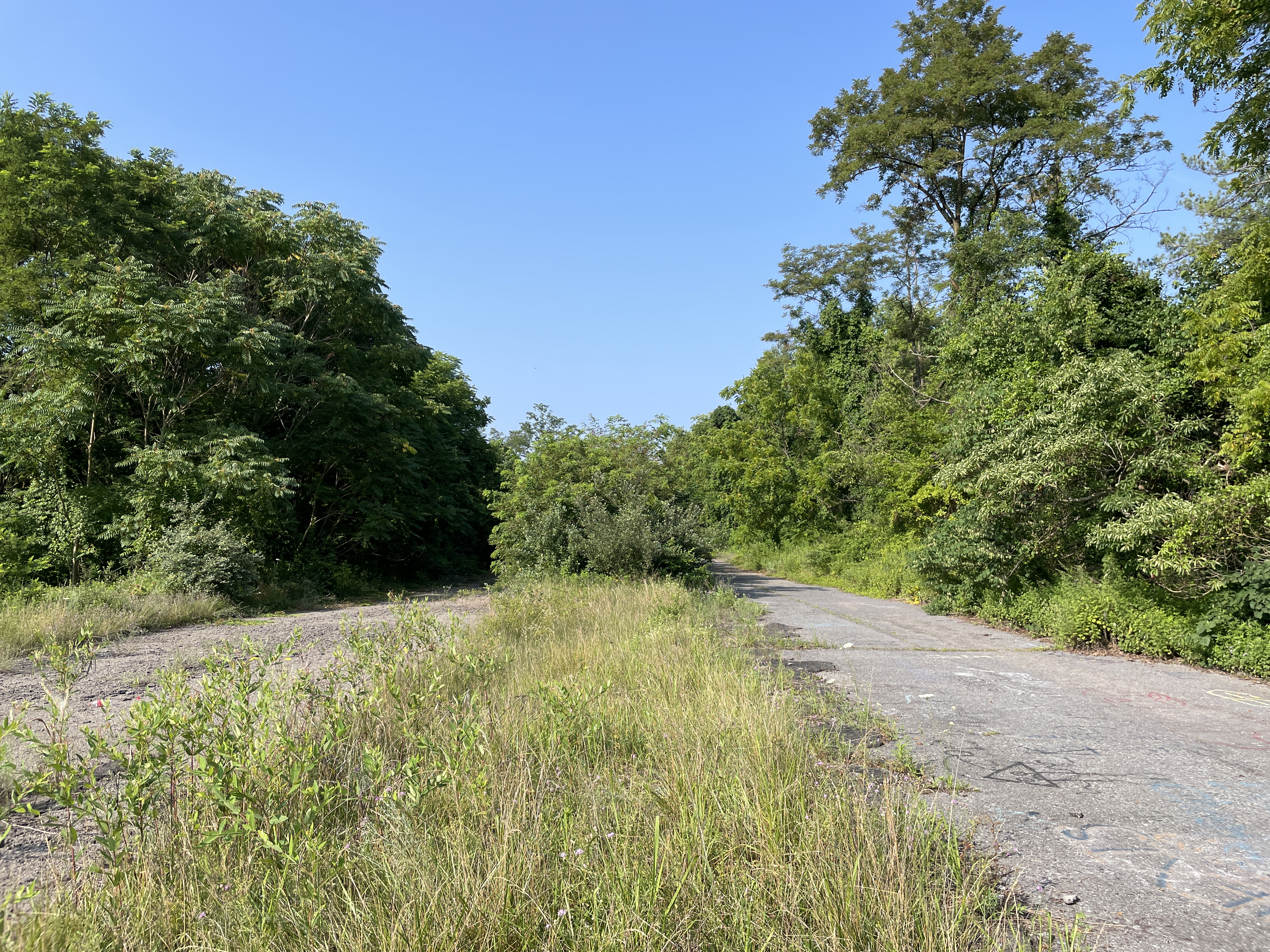
Nature is starting to reclaim parts of the original 1940s roadway.

When the Pennsylvania Turnpike opened in 1940, it was known as the "Tunnel Highway" because it traversed seven tunnels: from east to west, Blue Mountain, Kittatinny Mountain, Tuscarora Mountain, Sideling Hill, Rays Hill, Allegheny Mountain, and Laurel Hill. The Turnpike was built as a four-lane roadway with a grass median strip its entire length, except at each of the seven tunnels. At each tunnel the two lanes in each direction merged into one because each tunnel was only a single tube of two lanes, one in each direction. These tunnels were originally excavated to be part of the South Pennsylvania Railroad in the early 1880s, although the railroad was never completed and the tunnels were not drilled the entire way through until the Turnpike construction. The railroad's Quemahoning and Negro Mountain Tunnels were not used by the Turnpike, replaced with open cuts through the mountains which were judged to be cheaper and easier to build. The original Allegheny Mountain Tunnel was not used due to structural concerns, so a new tunnel was drilled just to the south of it.

=== Abandonment and later uses ===
The Turnpike was the first four-lane limited access superhighway in the nation, and the traffic estimates made during the road's construction in 1938 and 1939 turned out to be significantly lower than the demands placed on it by post-war traffic. By the late 1950s, the turnpike was so heavily used that traffic congestion caused significant bottlenecks where the four lanes of traffic had to merge into the two-lane tunnels, particularly on summer weekends. The Pennsylvania Turnpike Commission (PTC) conducted studies on either expanding or bypassing each of the seven tunnels. Following these studies, the PTC decided to construct new tubes at four of the tunnels and bypass the remaining three. Blue Mountain, Kittatinny Mountain, Tuscarora Mountain and Allegheny Mountain were each "twinned" with a second tube for four lane tunnel traffic. Laurel Hill was bypassed with a three mile alignment and a cut through the mountain which opened in 1964. The Sideling Hill and Rays Hill tunnels were bypassed by a 13-mile (21 km) new highway, as was the westbound-only Cove Valley Travel Plaza, which was located at the eastern portal of the Sideling Hill Tunnel. Instead, a new Sideling Hill Travel Plaza was built to cater for travelers in both directions on the turnpike. The turnpike bypass of Rays Hill and Sideling Hill tunnels opened to traffic on November 26, 1968.

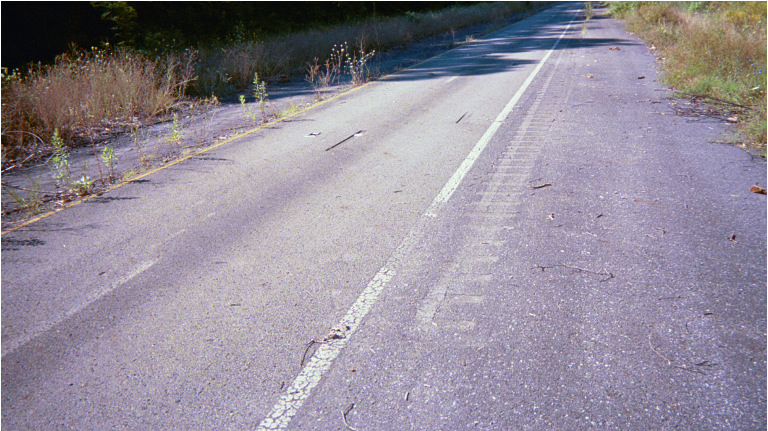
Test rumble strips from the SNAP project, just outside the western portal of the Rays Hill Tunnel

In the early 1970s, the emission levels of unleaded gasoline were tested in Rays Hill Tunnel. A Plymouth Satellite was used as the test vehicle. The PTC and PennDOT used the highway to train maintenance workers, as well as for testing of rumble strips. The site of the former Cove Valley Travel Plaza was used as a shooting range for the Pennsylvania State Police. There have also been numerous military uses for the highway; the tunnels were considered as a storage area for weapons, as was the open highway for aircraft. The military also used the highway for training soldiers for Iraq in the early 2000s, even after the highway was sold to the SAC. The PTC sold most of the property to the Southern Alleghenies Conservancy (SAC) for $1 in 2001. The property was then managed by Friends of the Pike 2 Bike, a coalition of non-profit groups (including the SAC) that eventually converted the stretch into a bike trail.

A business plan and feasibility study was completed by Gannett Fleming in 2005. It proposed various ideas to make the trail as accessible as possible for cyclists, hikers, inline skaters, and equestrians.

In 2008 the highway was used for the filming of the Dimension Films movie The Road starring Viggo Mortensen. The studios mildly restored the exterior of the eastern portal of the Ray's Hill Tunnel when it was used for filming.

In October 2018, Bedford and Fulton Counties approved Articles of Incorporation of The Bedford Fulton Joint Recreation Authority (BFJRA), a Pennsylvania Municipal Authority made up of members from Bedford County and Fulton County. The Authority subsequently purchased the property from SAC, and it was renamed The Old PA Pike (TOPP) Trail.

In 2023, the BFJRA was awarded a $358,000 Appalachian Regional Commission (ARC) grant. In 2024, the BFJRA was awarded a Greenways, Trails and Recreation Program grant. In 2025, the BFJRA was awarded a $138,900 grant from the Pennsylvania Department of Conservation and Natural Resources to develop a master plan for rehabilitating two historic tunnels along The Old PA Pike Trail in Bedford and Fulton counties.

Today, the TOPP Trail is a popular tourist attraction. The tunnel's entrances have deteriorated due to vandalism, and the lettering with the names of the tunnels in the windows over the portals were taken sometime between 1981 and 1992. However, the tunnel structure is still sound despite not having been maintained for decades.

== Access ==
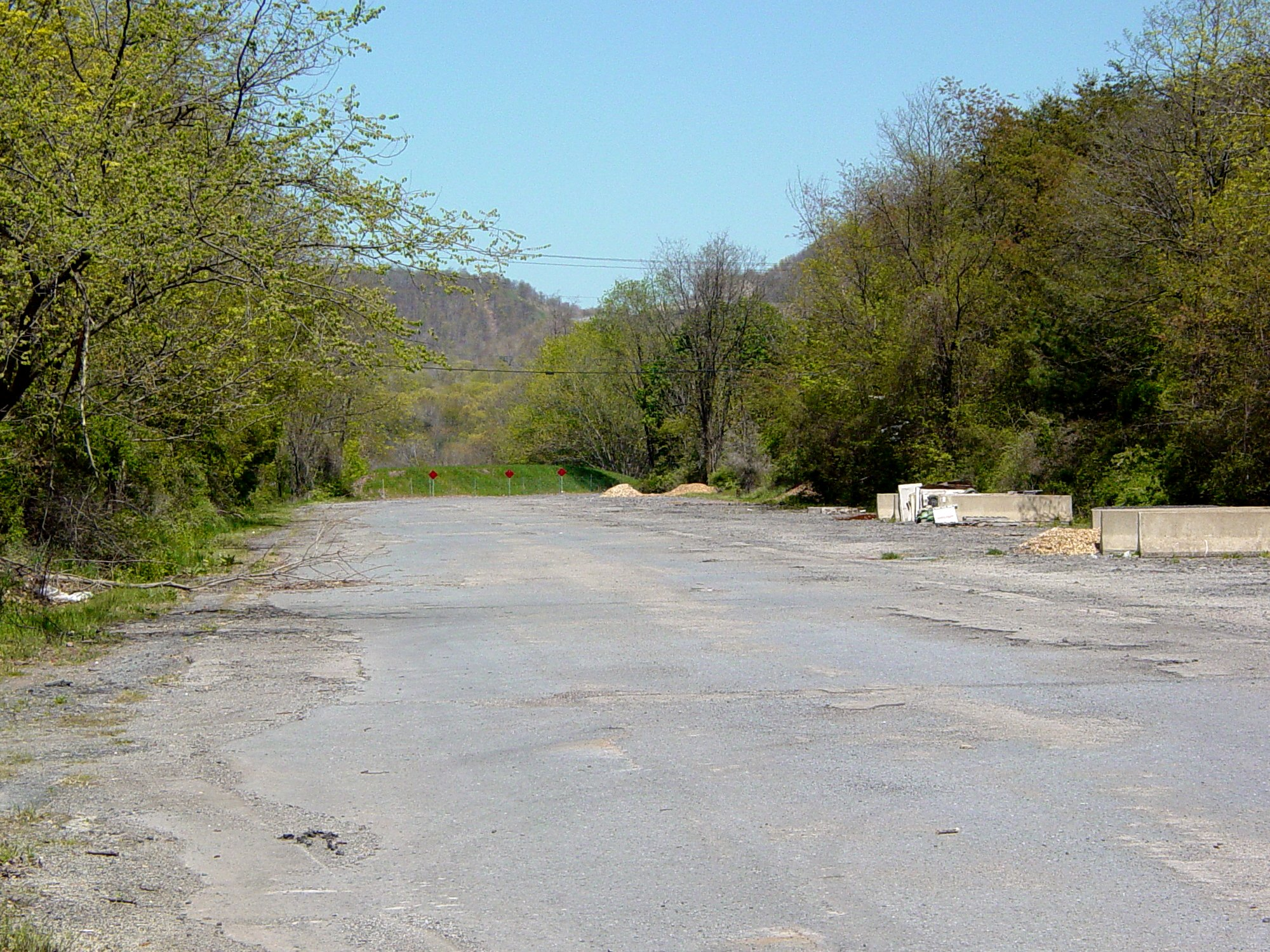
End of the remaining PTC-owned stub of the abandoned Pennsylvania Turnpike following the demolition of a bridge over US 30

The western end of the bypassed alignment is located at the Breezewood Interchange, whose toll booths opened in 1970. The old turnpike alignment continues east from here and is still in use as the four-lane road connecting the new Breezewood Interchange with the old interchange, some of the ramps of which are used to connect to US 30, and the unused ramps are also still visible. The eastern end of the old alignment connects with the mainline Turnpike just east of the Sideling Hill Service Plaza. For many years the old alignment was blocked off with a simple chain-link fence and gates that were frequently left open, meaning that cars, ATVs and other vehicles could still drive the abandoned alignment from end to end through both tunnels, over bridges and under overpasses, and although this was posted as being prohibited it was still commonly done by local residents and those who were aware of the abandoned roadway.

In 2005, the PTC restricted access to the abandoned turnpike by demolishing an overpass over U.S. Route 30 (US 30) in Breezewood and an overpass on Pump Station Road near the site of the old Cove Valley Travel Plaza. The demolition of the overpasses removed the liability and expense of repairing the aging bridges, marked the property lines between the public and the PTC-owned sections of the property, and prevented motorized vehicles from easily entering the abandoned turnpike.

The original plans for the removal included an access road, but somewhere along the way, it was removed and not known to Pike 2 Bike officials until it was too late. As of 2012, the Friends of the Pike 2 Bike were seeking to obtain grants that will allow the building of an access road and to rebuild the last remaining original toll booth, which was obtained in 2006. The toll booth will collect a parking donation that will be used to pay for site maintenance and upkeep. An access road was built in the late 2000s on the PTC-owned side of the former Pump Station Road overpass, making the 3.5-mile (5.6 km) section still owned by the PTC a de facto access road to the active turnpike in itself; however, like other access roads along the turnpike, it is off-limits to the public and is only used by the PTC or Pennsylvania State Police.

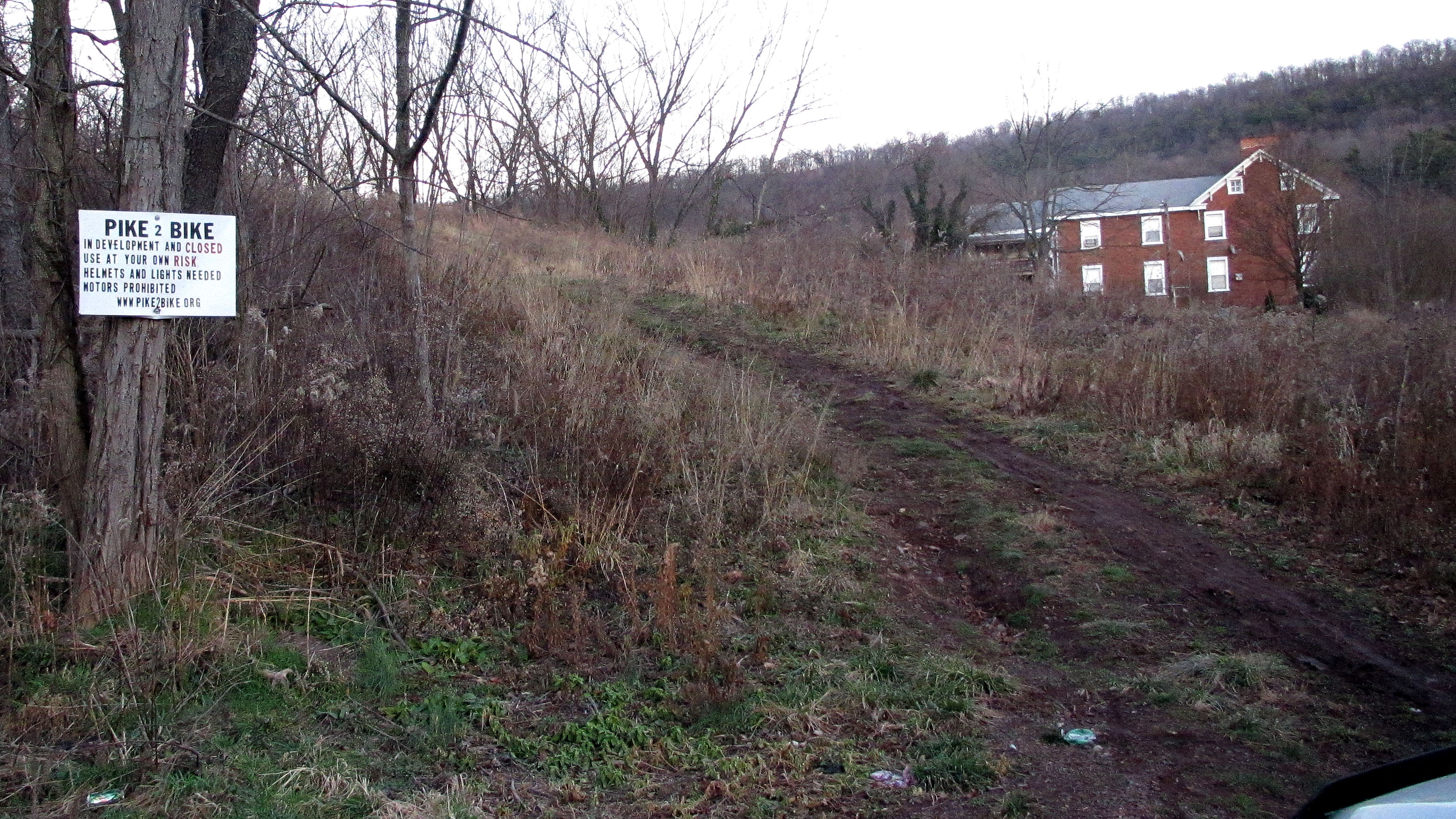
Access point at US 30 and Tannery Road

There are three access points to the public section of the abandoned highway:

- The intersection of Tannery Road and US 30 is just east of the Breezewood Interchange where I-70, US-30, and I-76 meet. It sits near the western end of the former turnpike, which can be reached by climbing a small hill. Parking is available in front of the gate at the top of the hill. Rays Hill Tunnel lies about two miles east of this point.
- A parking lot exists on the trail at the eastern end of the turnpike off Pump Station Road north of US 30; the entrance is a service road just south of where a turnpike overpass was removed in 2005. This access point lies near the site of the former Cove Valley Travel Plaza and about one mile east of the Sideling Hill Tunnel.
- A gravel road maintained by the State Forest Service called Oregon Road leaves US Route 30 at that highway's intersection with Pennsylvania Route 915 about a mile east of the crest of Ray's Hill. Oregon Road runs north from US Route 30 for several hundred feet, then bears to the right after it passes under the Pennsylvania Turnpike (I-76). The road to the left is a privately owned driveway leading to Valley-Hi. The road to the right is Oregon Road, which runs for several miles of dirt and gravel road before reconnecting with PA 915 just south of Wells Tannery. Oregon Road runs parallel and adjacent to the abandoned highway for much of its length, and several clearings in the forest allow for parking and access to the road. These access points lie between the two tunnels: Rays Hill is about three miles west and Sideling Hill is about two miles east.

== Other tunnel bypasses ==
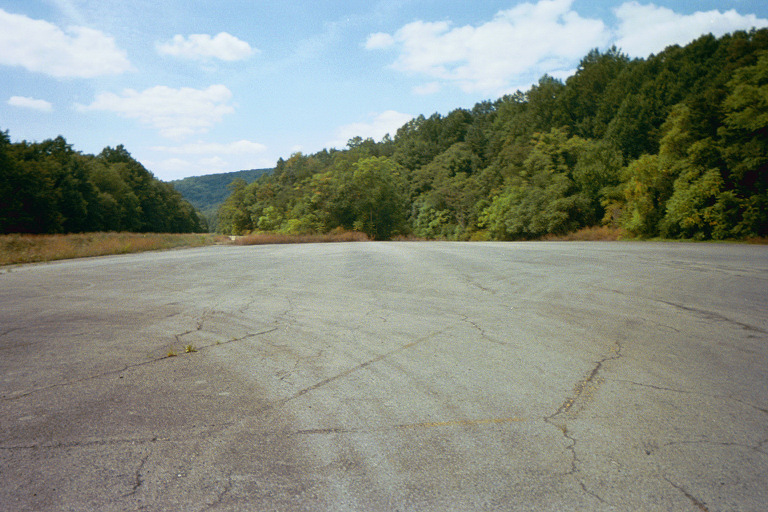
Site of the former Cove Valley Travel Plaza, the Sideling Hill Tunnel is about a half mile to the west

The abandoned turnpike is perhaps the best-known of tunnel bypasses on toll roads. Among the other bypassed tunnels:

- The Laurel Hill Tunnel, which preceded the Sideling Hill and Rays Hill bypass by four years.
- The Memorial Tunnel on the West Virginia Turnpike was bypassed in 1987 to complete upgrading that highway to Interstate standards. Unlike the Pennsylvania Turnpike, the West Virginia Turnpike was only built as a two-lane highway for almost its entire length, and needed an additional two lanes in order to get the I-77 and I-64 designations.
- The PTC considered bypassing the Lehigh Tunnel on the Northeast Extension before ultimately deciding on twinning the tunnel. Cost for the bypass and unnecessary added mileage to the highway were deciding factors.
- The PTC has been considering bypassing the deteriorating Allegheny Mountain Tunnel to alleviate traffic congestion. Boring a third tunnel is also being considered. Planning resumed in 2014.
