= Sweet Root Natural Area =

Natural area in Pennsylvania

- Location within Pennsylvania
- Location: Bedford County, Pennsylvania
- Nearest town: Chaneysville
- Coordinates: 39°50′25″N 78°31′42″W
- Area: 1,526 acres (618 ha)

Sweet Root Natural Area is a 1,526-acre (618 ha) protected area in Bedford County, Pennsylvania, United States. It is part of Buchanan State Forest.

== Description ==
The Natural Area was originally established to protect a small grove of old-growth hemlock trees, but most of those were damaged by a woolly adelgid infestation. However, a 69-acre parcel of old-growth hemlocks survived and are protected within the Natural Area. The area has since been expanded to protect a second-growth forest of oaks and other hardwoods.

The area has been added to the Old-Growth Forest Network because even the second-growth trees have surpassed 150 years old, never having been harvested by loggers during the Pennsylvania logging era because of the rugged terrain. The area has a history of saltpeter mining dating back to the American Revolution, and if protects the watershed of Sweet Root Run, which in turn has been designated as a protected wild trout stream.
