= Tuscarora Mountain Tunnel =

Tunnel in Pennsylvania, USA

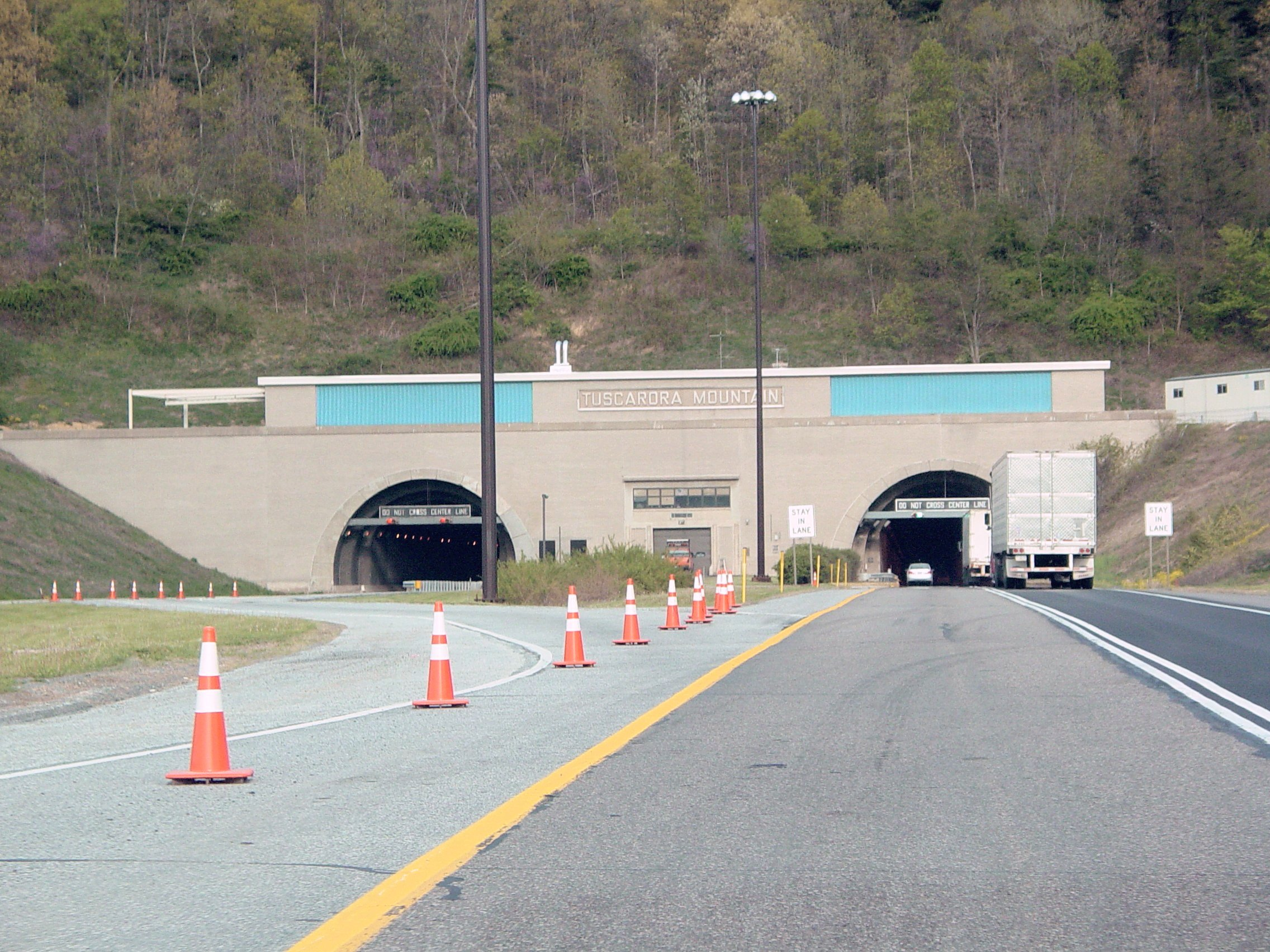
- Tuscarora Tunnel, Western Portal
- Interactive map of Tuscarora Mountain Tunnel

Overview
- Location: Tuscarora Mountain, Franklin / Huntingdon counties, Pennsylvania, USA
- Coordinates: 40.0892°N 77.8446°W
- Route: I-76 / Penna Turnpike
- Crosses: Tuscarora Mountain

Operation
- Operator: Pennsylvania Turnpike Commission
- Toll: Tolls vary by location of entry and exit of turnpike, E-ZPass available

Technical
- Length: 5,326 feet (1,623 m) or 1.1 miles (1.8 km)
- No. of lanes: 4
- Tunnel clearance: 14 feet (4.3 m) (estimated)

The Tuscarora Mountain Tunnel is one of four original Pennsylvania Turnpike tunnels still in active use. A second tube was bored in the late 1960s to ease traffic conditions. The tunnel measures 1.1 miles (1.8 km) in length and is the second-longest active tunnel on the turnpike. The 1.3-mile-long (2.1 km) Sideling Hill Tunnel is the longest overall, but was abandoned in 1968. The Allegheny Mountain Tunnel is the longest in active use. The Tuscarora Mountain Tunnel sits on the Huntingdon/Franklin County line.
