= Sideling Hill Creek =

Sideling Hill Creek may refer to:

- Sideling Hill Creek (Aughwick Creek tributary), Huntingdon County, Pennsylvania, U.S.
- Sideling Hill Creek (Potomac River tributary), Maryland and Pennsylvania, U.S.
