= Southern Alleghenies Conservancy =

Southern Alleghenies Conservancy is a non-profit nature group preserving the environment in South Western and South Central Pennsylvania, covering Bedford, Blair, Cambria, Fulton, Huntingdon, and Somerset counties.

== Current projects ==
The SAC has many projects in preserving the environment in South Western and South Central PA, the most notable include converting the Abandoned Pennsylvania Turnpike (which the SAC bought from the Pennsylvania Turnpike Commission in 2001 for $1) into a biketrail and, to a lesser extent, some involvement in getting a permanent Flight 93 memorial built in Somerset County to honor the victims of 9/11. In the case of the Abandoned Turnpike, the property is currently leased to the Pike2Bike, a coalition of other non-profit groups including the SAC to convert it into the biketrail.

== See also ==
- Abandoned Pennsylvania Turnpike
- Flight 93 Memorial
