= Allegheny Mountain Tunnel =

Vehicular tunnel carrying the Pennsylvania Turnpike through the Allegheny Mountains

Coordinates: 39°57′41.7″N 78°51′24.1″W

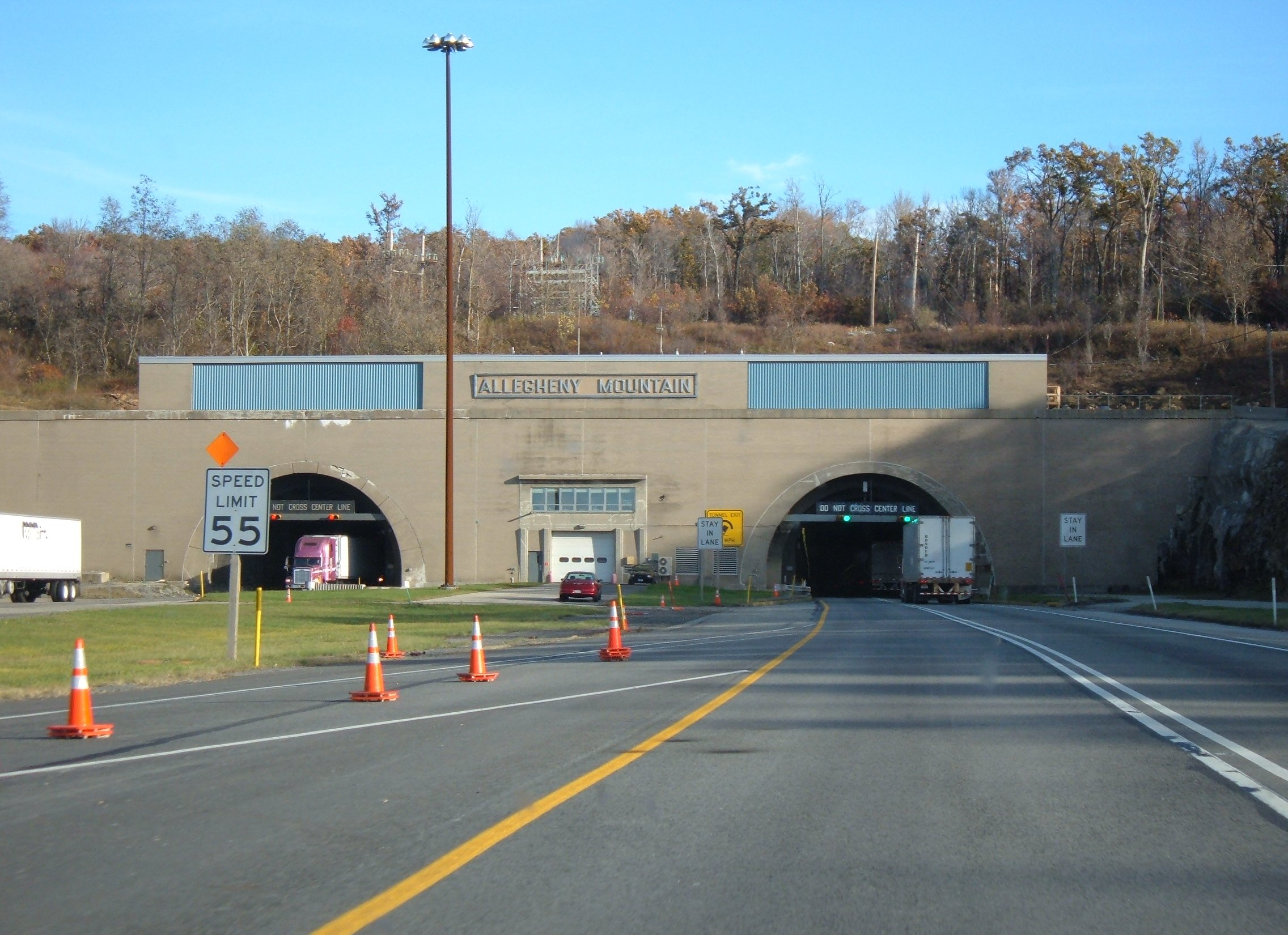
- The westbound tubes entrance, this was the tube constructed as part of the original Turnpike
- Interactive map of Allegheny Mountain Tunnel

Overview
- Location: Somerset County, Pennsylvania
- Route: I-70 / I-76 / Penna Turnpike

Operation
- Constructed: 1939
- Opened: October 1, 1940 (present-day westbound tube); March 15, 1965 (eastbound tube)
- Operator: Pennsylvania Turnpike Commission
- Character: Twin-bore tunnel

Technical
- Length: 6,070 feet (1,850 m)
- No. of lanes: 4 (two in each direction)
- Max elevation: 2,314 feet (705 m)

The Allegheny Mountain Tunnel is a vehicular tunnel carrying the Pennsylvania Turnpike through the Allegheny Mountains. At this point, the Turnpike carries Interstates 70 and 76. When the tunnel was built, it was considered an "engineering marvel."

The tunnel was built in 1939 and is used by 11 million vehicles annually today. Throughout the 2000s, state officials attempted to implement plans to replace the tunnel, citing the westbound tube's age.

Tunnel hazmat restrictions sign

== History ==
The original Allegheny Mountain Tunnel was built in the late 19th century for the South Pennsylvania Railroad, which was never completed. This tunnel was not used due to concerns about its structural integrity.

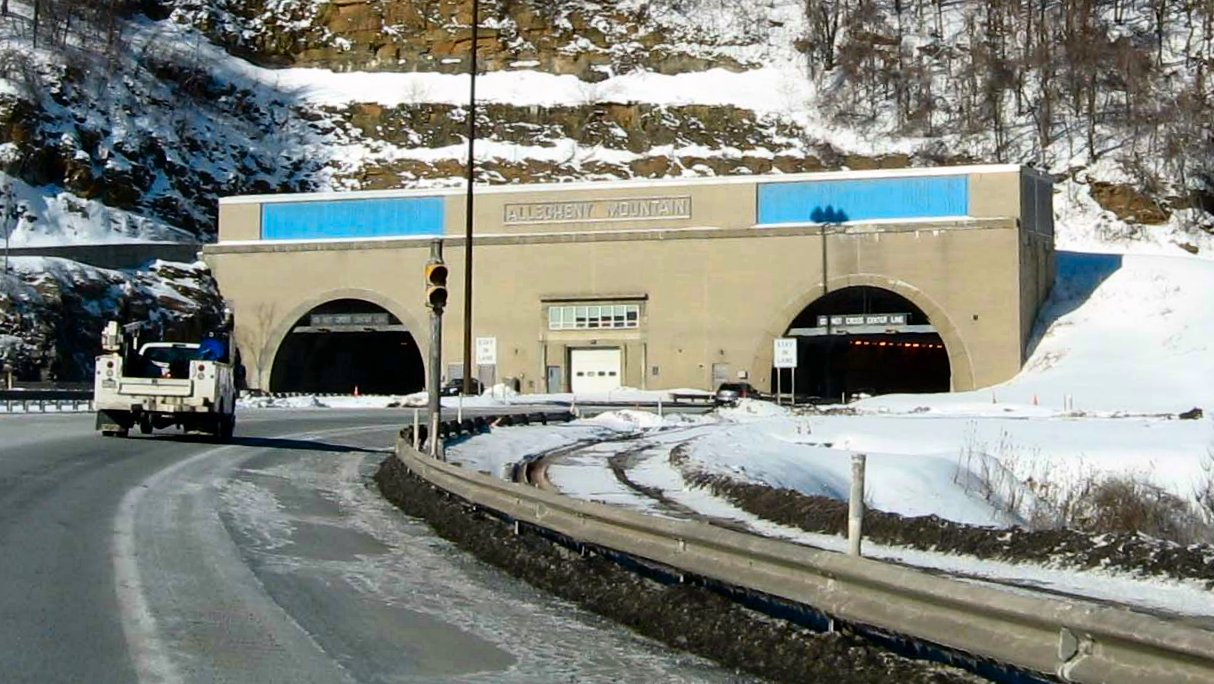
Eastern entrance to the tunnel

The eastern end of this original tunnel can be seen by parking on the service road at the turnpike's eastern portal and walking up to the area just above and a bit north of the turnpike portal. The opening is visible in the rocks just uphill. Entering this old tunnel is prohibited.

The current westbound tunnel was built in 1939 as part of the original construction for the highway. It was opened to general traffic in 1940 after the Pennsylvania Turnpike was opened. At first, this tunnel served both westbound and eastbound traffic with a single lane in each direction.

In 1964, I-76 was routed into the tunnel.

Work on boring the second tube at Allegheny Mountain Tunnel also began on September 6, 1962. The former South Pennsylvania Railroad tunnel was considered but was again rejected because of its poor condition. On March 15, 1965, the new tube opened to traffic, after which the original tube was closed to allow updates to be made. It reopened on August 25, 1966. The construction of the second tube at Allegheny Mountain cost $12 million (equivalent to $88.4 million in 2024). Both tunnels are approximately 6,070 feet (1,850 m) in length, making them the longest tunnels on the Pennsylvania Turnpike that are still in use (the bypassed Sideling Hill Tunnel is slightly longer, at 6,782 feet (2,067 m)). Explosives and other hazardous materials are not allowed in the tunnels. Vehicles carrying these materials must exit the turnpike at Bedford to the east or Somerset to the west and take other roads around the tunnel. Restrictions on some hazardous materials in non-bulk form have been lifted.

== Planned bypassing ==
Long term plans call for major maintenance to be performed on the tunnels; however, this presents a major problem for traffic. Terrible backups prompted officials to build the second tube. With today's traffic volumes, it would not be feasible to close one tube and route all traffic through the other.

On October 22, 2013, WJAC-TV reported that the Pennsylvania Turnpike Commission had decided to replace the tunnel with either a new tunnel or a bypass. The reason for the replacement was that officials determined that the tunnel had reached old age and was becoming run-down. By 2013, the original (westbound) tunnel was 73 years old, servicing approximately 11 million vehicles every year. A local hunting group called Mountain Field and Stream Club owns 1,000 acres of land around the tunnel, and the group had opposed plans to replace the tunnel in 2001. Possible plans include building a third tunnel, as well as bypassing the tunnels completely as was done for the Laurel Hill in 1964 and the Rays Hill and Sideling Hill tunnels in 1968. On December 24, 2014, the PTC announced it was going forward with plans to replace the Allegheny Mountain Tunnel.

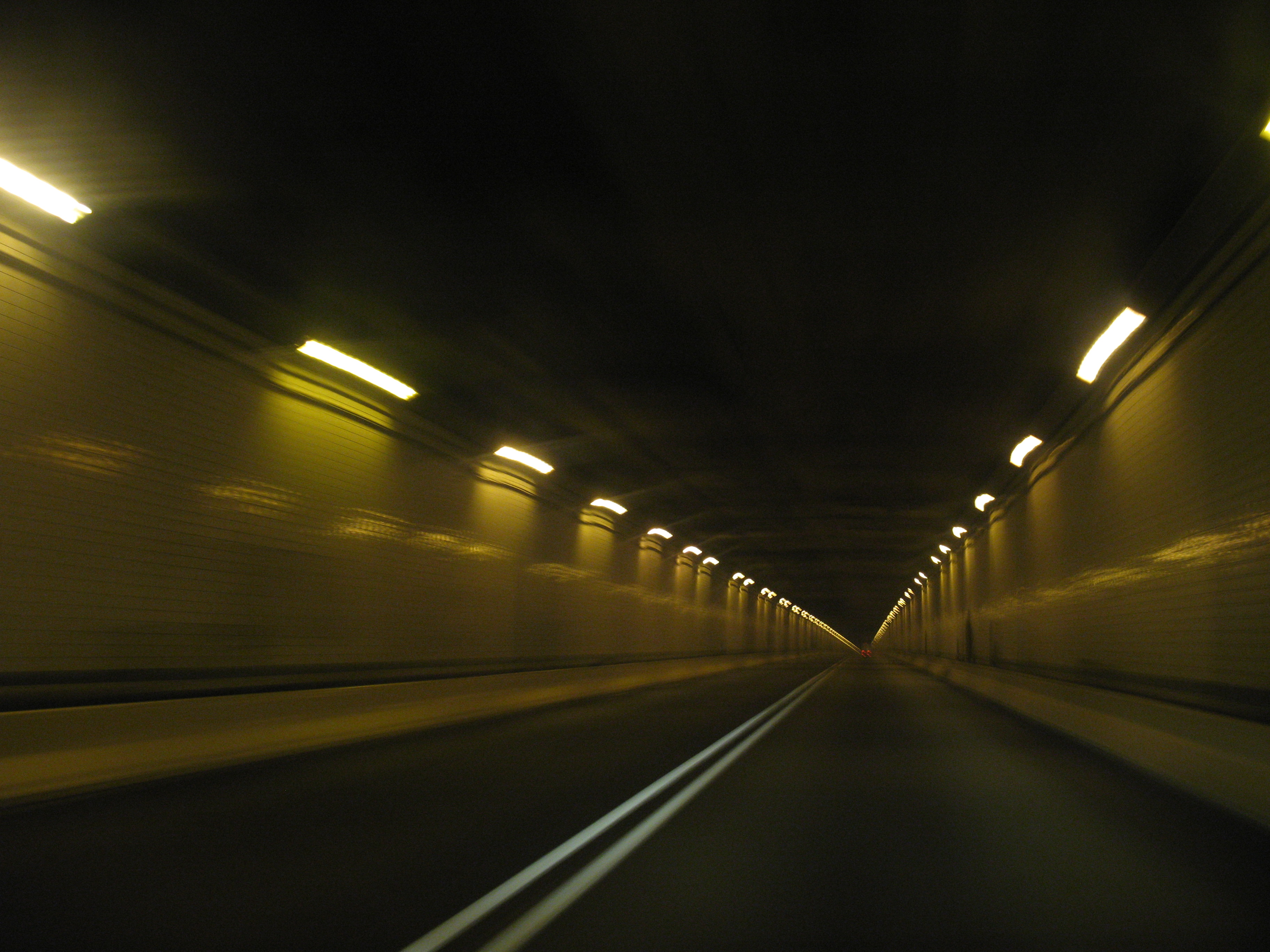
Interior of the tunnel

In 2020, following analysis of several design alternatives, the Pennsylvania Turnpike Commission opted for a new road-only alignment to the south of the tunnels. The choice of this option was due to its lower cost ($332 million versus $628 million for a replacement tunnel), and its lesser disruption to the environment. Several sharp curves to the east of the tunnel will be redesigned to meet current standards. The project is funded for design, but not for construction. As of 2026 construction was planned to start in 2032.

== Sources ==
- Dakelman, Mitchell E. & Schorr, Neal A. (2004). The Pennsylvania Turnpike. Images of America. Mount Pleasant, SC: Arcadia Publishing. ISBN 0-7385-3532-X. OCLC 55992362.
