= Rays Hill Tunnel =

Tunnel on the original Pennsylvania Turnpike

- Rays Hill Tunnel at night in 1942, photographed by Arthur Rothstein
- Interactive map of Rays Hill Tunnel

Overview
- Line: South Pennsylvania Railroad abandoned
- Location: Rays Hill, Bedford / Fulton counties, Pennsylvania, USA
- Coordinates: 40°01′05″N 78°12′14″W
- Status: Abandoned Pennsylvania Turnpike; Currently Pike2Bike Trail
- Crosses: Rays Hill

Operation
- Work began: 1881 - railway 1938 - highway
- Constructed: 1881–1885 - railway 1938–1940 - highway
- Opened: October 1, 1940
- Closed: November 26, 1968 - Interstate 76 (aged 28 years)
- Owner: South Pennsylvania Railroad abandoned Pennsylvania Turnpike Commission abandoned Pike2Bike Trail
- Character: Hiking, biking, and skateboard trail

Technical
- Length: 3,532 feet (1,077 m) - highway
- No. of lanes: 2

Rays Hill Tunnel is an abandoned tunnel, formerly part of the Pennsylvania Turnpike.

Rays Hill Tunnel is 3,532 feet (1,077 m) long. It was the shortest of the seven original tunnels on Pennsylvania Turnpike. Due to its short length, its ventilation fans were installed only at its western portal. Its eastern portal is the only one of the 14 tunnel portals on the original turnpike that has no ventilation fan housing. This difference could be seen by westbound traffic on the Turnpike.

The tunnel connects Bedford and Fulton Counties in South Central Pennsylvania.

== Replacement ==
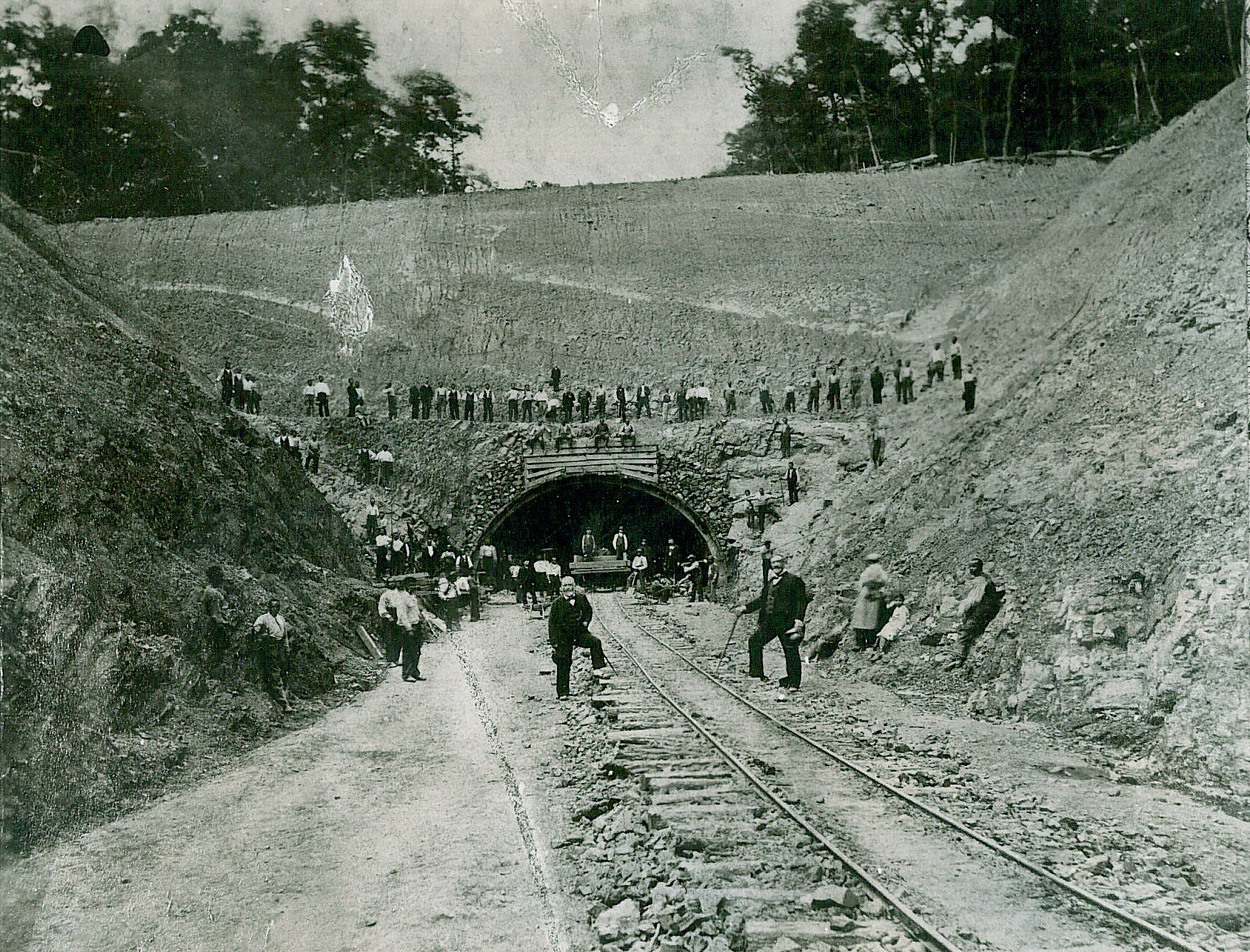
Rays Hill Tunnel during construction of the railroad tunnel in the 1880s. Andrew Carnegie is present in the middle of the photo

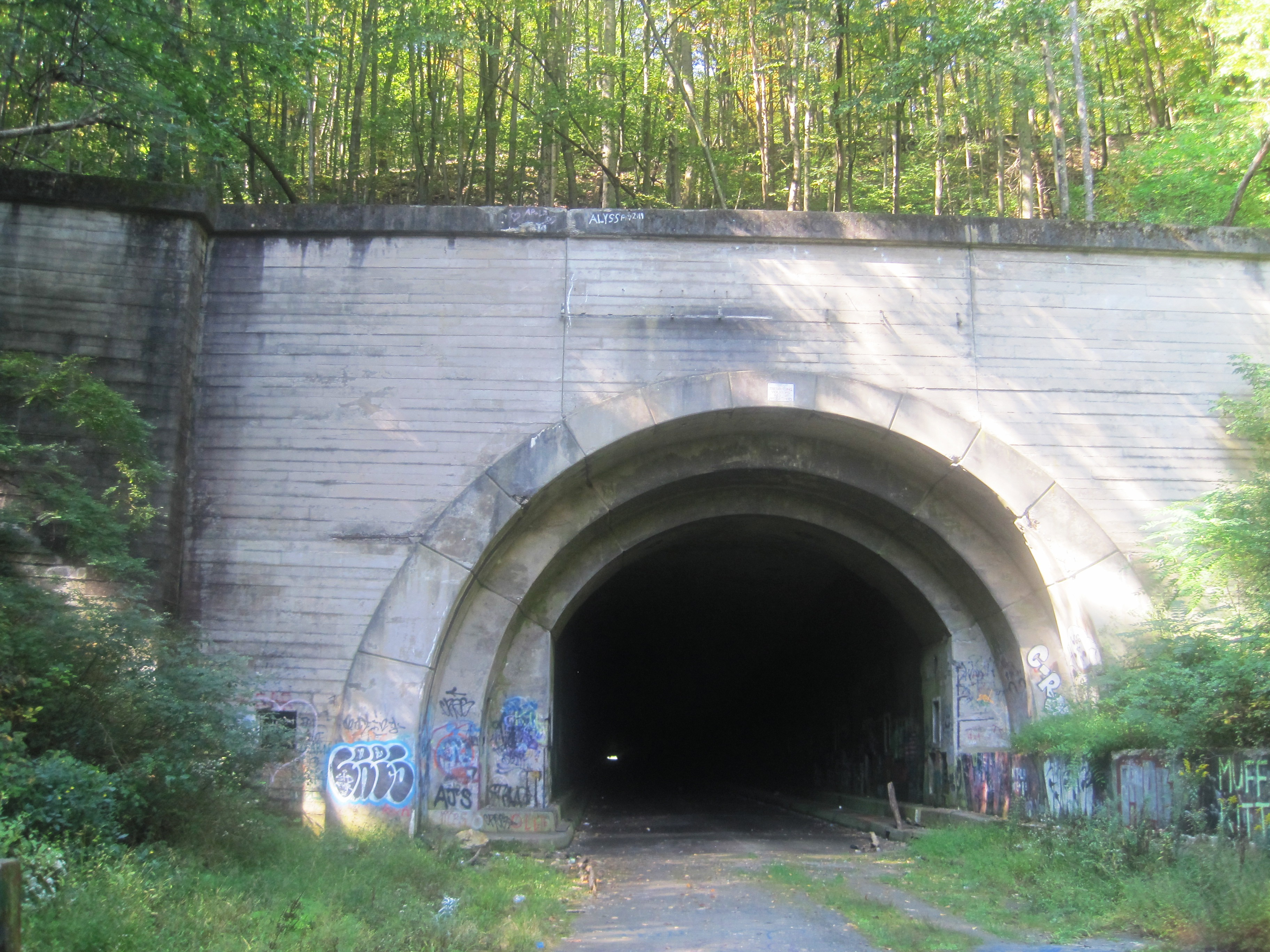
East portal to Rays Hill Tunnel in 2019

From the Turnpike's opening in 1940 until the realignment projects, the tunnels were bottlenecks due to reduced speeds with opposing traffic in the same tubes. Studies were completed for the remaining five mainline tunnels to determine the cost benefit of twinning of the tunnels, or complete bypass. After the studies completed, the decision was made to go ahead with a US $100 million (Note: In 1962 the contract cost on average of $100 million. This is equivalent to $1.06 billion in 2025.) construction project to work with the tunnels. Construction began on September 6, 1962, with the first subproject being a bypass of the Laurel Hill Tunnel. On October 30, 1964, just two years after construction began, the Laurel Hill Bypass was completed and opened.

The Laurel Hill Tunnel was permanently closed on that day; however, this was not the last bypass to occur for tunnels along the turnpike. Two years after the closing of the Laurel Hill, the Allegheny Mountain became the first tunnel to be twinned, and opened on August 25, 1966. With the twinning of the Blue Mountain, Kittatinny Mountain and Tuscarora Mountain tunnels under construction, the Commission turned its focus to the remaining two mainline tunnels, the Rays Hill Tunnel (the shortest tunnel) and the Sideling Hill Tunnel (the longest tunnel).

An engineering report dating back to 1961 suggested that building a bypass around the last two mainline tunnels was the best way to solve the congestion. The commission awarded three contracts to construct the bypass from July 1966 to March 1967. The contracts cost $17.2 million (Note: In 1966 the contract cost on average of $17.2 million. This is equivalent to $171 million in 2025.) for roadway and another $2.5 million (Note: In 1966 the contract cost on average of $2.5 million. This is equivalent to $24.8 million in 2025.) for construction of a new Sideling Hill Service Plaza to replace the Cove Valley Service Plaza, which was along the to-be-bypassed alignment. The $2.5 million project was to include ramps from both directions to the service plaza, so it could serve both directions. The style of the tunnel bypass was to follow the same style as the Laurel Hill bypass. On November 26, 1968, the three twinned tunnels opened, and the bypass of the Rays Hill and Sideling Hill Tunnels opened. The new bypass also opened the Breezewood Interchange and the number of lanes along the turnpike expanded to four (two in each direction) or five (two in each direction, plus a climbing lane going uphill).

In 2001, the Turnpike Commission gave control of the 13.5 miles (21.7 km) length of the Rays Hill and Sideling Hill Tunnels and other roadways to the Southern Alleghenies Conservancy, who began work to convert the stretch into a bicycle trail. The trail is used by hundreds of bicycle riders, and studies occurred in 2004 and 2005 to figure how to best safely construct the trail. Because there is a lack of good lighting in the tunnels the conservancy wants to look into how to solve it. The system is called the Pike2Bike Trail and is planned to be an 18 miles (29 km) mountain bicycle loop that serves access to the Pennsylvania Department of Transportation's BicyclePA Route S. Four other tunnels on the Turnpike – Allegheny Mountain, Tuscarora Mountain, Kittatinny Mountain, and Blue Mountain – each had a second tube bored, as it was determined in these instances to be the less expensive option. All of the original tunnels were part of the never-completed South Pennsylvania Railroad which history has dubbed "Vanderbilt's Folly."

== Current ==
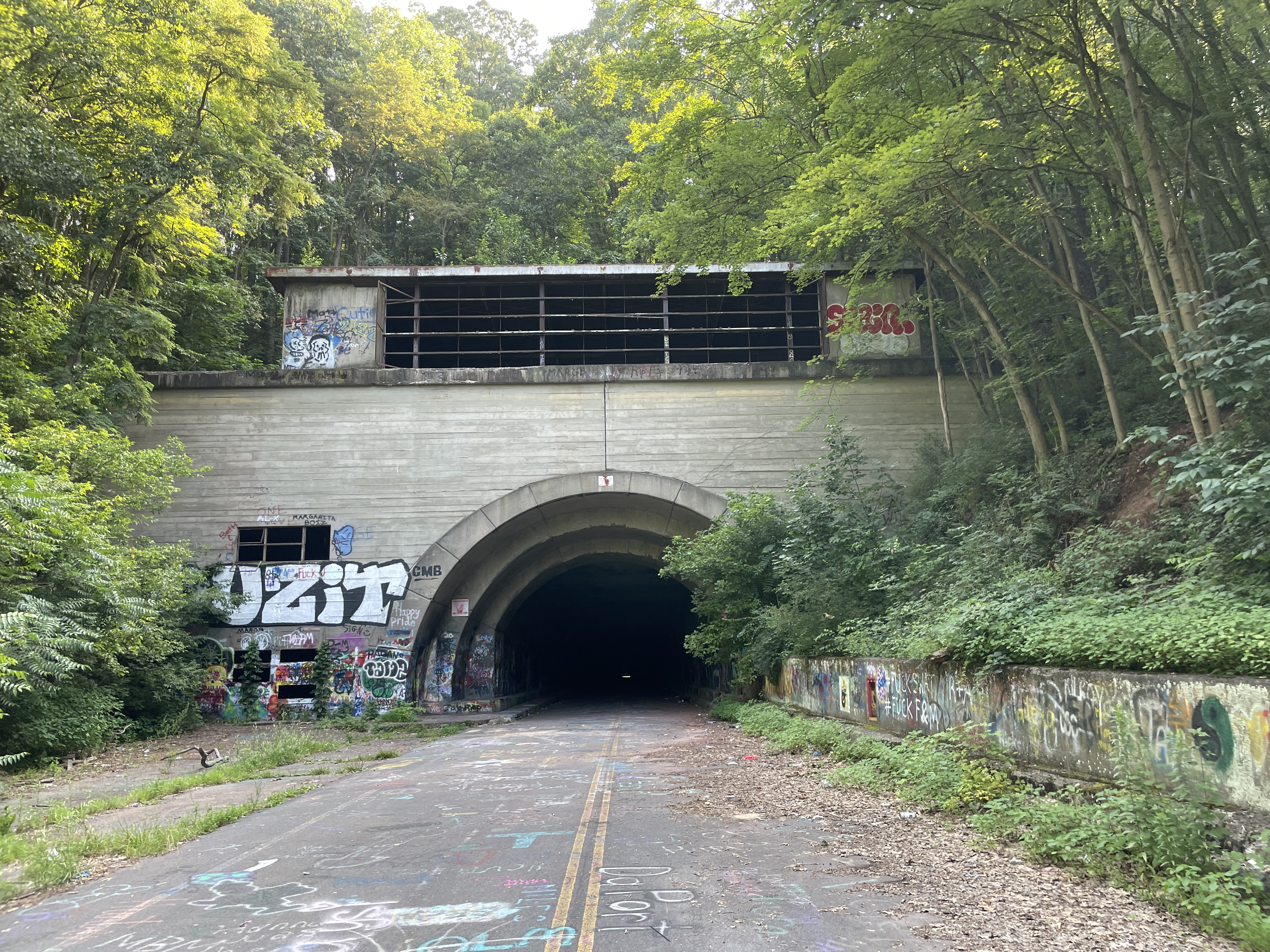
West portal to Rays Hill Tunnel in 2023

At the present time, the tunnels remain unlit and unimproved since their closure in 1968. The entire length of the bypassed section is now commonly known as the Abandoned Pennsylvania Turnpike.

== Trivia ==
The tunnel was prominently featured in the 2005 music video for the song "Foxtrot Uniform Charlie Kilo" by American rock band Bloodhound Gang.
