= Kittatinny Mountain Tunnel =

Tunnel in Pennsylvania, United States

Coordinates: 40°09′10″N 77°40′14″W

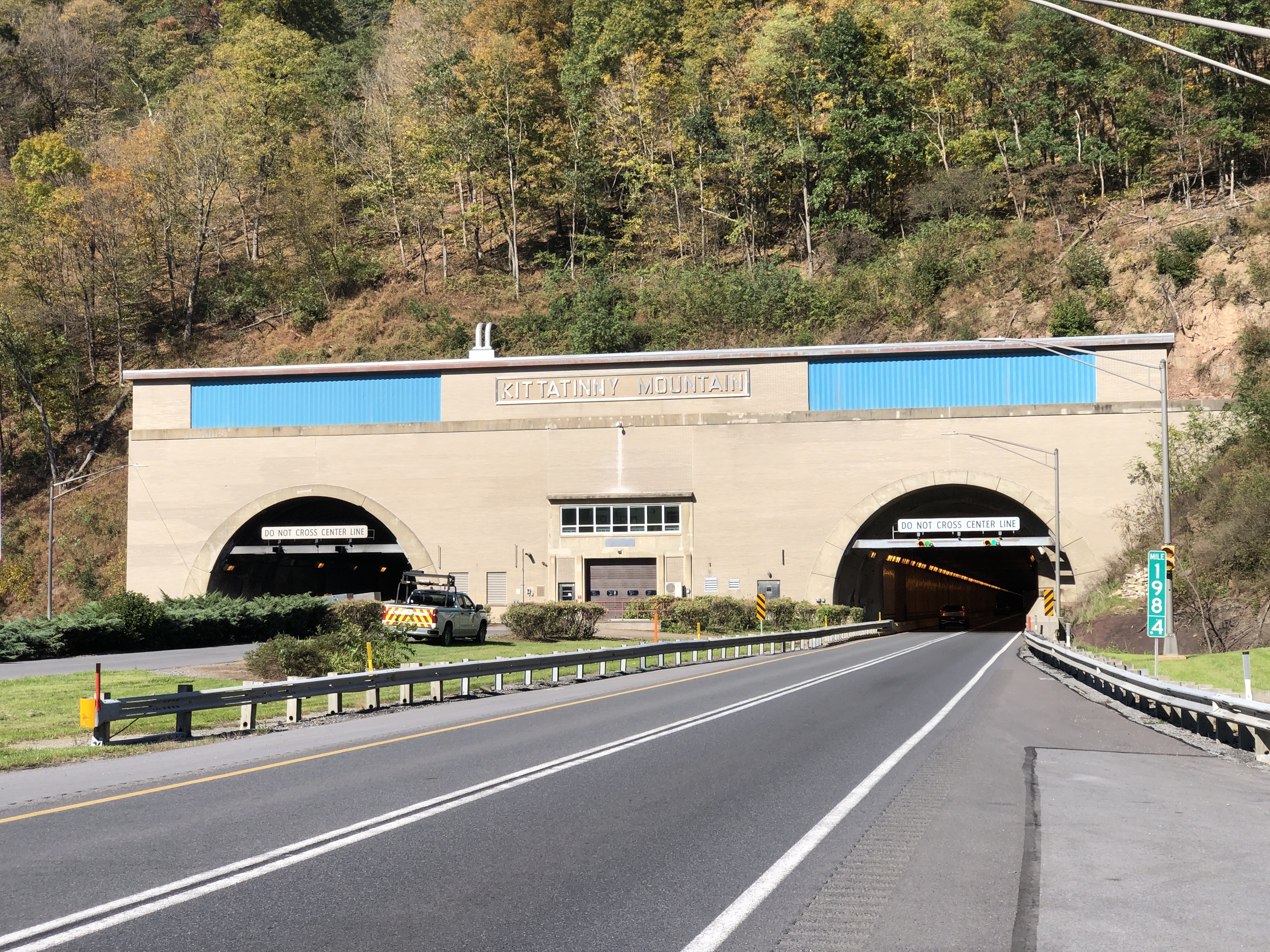
- The eastern portal of the Kittatinny Mountain Tunnel
- Interactive map of Kittatinny Mountain Tunnel

Overview
- Location: Kittatinny Mountain
- Route: I-76 / Penna Turnpike
- Crosses: Kittatinny Mountain

Operation
- Operator: Pennsylvania Turnpike Commission

Technical
- Length: 4,727 feet (1,441 m)
- No. of lanes: 4 (two in each direction)

The Kittatinny Mountain Tunnel is a 4,727 ft (1,441 m) tunnel which carries the Pennsylvania Turnpike through Kittatinny Mountain in Franklin County, Pennsylvania. One of seven tunnels completed for the turnpike, and one of four still in use today, it is located 600 feet (180 m) west of the Blue Mountain Tunnel, separated by the Gunter Valley.

== Popular culture ==
The Kittatinny Mountain Tunnel's western portal is featured on the first postcard during the opening sequence of National Lampoon's Vacation.
