= Tussey Mountain School District =

School district in Pennsylvania

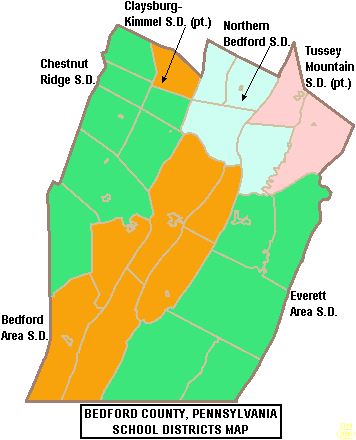

Location
- Bedford and Huntingdon counties Saxton / Robertsdale / Defiance, Pennsylvania, 16678 (Main Office); United States

District information
- Type: Public

Students and staff
- District mascot: Titan
- Colors: Black and Red

Other information
- Website: www.tmsd.net

The Tussey Mountain School District is a public school district serving parts of Bedford County, Pennsylvania and Huntingdon County, Pennsylvania. The rural district serves a large number of communities. In Huntingdon County, it encompasses the boroughs of Broad Top City, Dudley, and Coalmont as well as the townships of Carbon, Hopewell, Todd, and Wood. In Bedford County, it serves Coaldale and Saxton Boroughs, as well as Broad Top and Liberty Townships. The district encompasses approximately 173 square miles. According to 2000 federal census data, it serves a resident population of 7,689.

The district is named after a mountain of the same name just to the northeast of the area.

== Schools ==
The district operates one elementary school (All K-4), and a Junior/Senior High School (5–12).

- Saxton-Liberty Elementary School
  - 1110 Mifflin St.
    Saxton, Pennsylvania 16678
- Tussey Mountain Junior/Senior High School
  - 199 Front St.
    Saxton, Pennsylvania 16678
