= Tussey Mountain Junior/Senior High School =

Coordinates: 40.22018°N 78.23681°W

Location
- 199 Front Street; Saxton, Pennsylvania 16678; United States

Information
- School district: Tussey Mountain School District
- NCES District ID: 4223970
- Superintendent: Jerry Shoemake
- NCES School ID: 422397000753
- Senior High Principal: Matthew McCahan
- Faculty: 45
- Grades: 5–12
- Enrollment: 529 (2009-10)
- Student to teacher ratio: 12:1
- Team name: Titans
- Communities served: Broad Top City, Coaldale, Coalmont, Dudley, Saxton
- Feeder schools: Tussey Mountain Elementary School

Tussey Mountain Junior/Senior High School is a comprehensive high school, located in extreme northeastern Bedford County, Pennsylvania serving around 525 students in grades 7–12.

== Graduation requirements ==
A student wishing to graduate from Tussey Mountain must obtain 25 credits, complete a Graduation Project, as well as score profiecent or above on the Pennsylvania System of State Assessments.

=== Course breakdown ===
- English - 4.0 Credits
- Science - 3.0 Credits
- Social Studies - 3.0 Credits
- Mathematics - 3.0 Credits
- Arts, Humanities, or Arts & Humanities - 2.0 Credits
- Physical Education - 1.5 Credits
- Health - 0.5 Credit
- Electives - 6.5 Credits
- Applied Life Skills - 0.5 Credit
- 1.0 Credit in an Academic or Vocational Area

== Courses of study ==
There are several courses of study available to the TMHS student, as follows:

- Business Vocational
- Production Industries
- Home Economics Occupations
- Building Construction Occupations
- Electronics
- Academic - Business Emphasis
- Academic - Math/Science Emphasis
- Academic - Arts/Communications Emphasis

== Athletics ==
- Baseball – Class A
- Basketball – Class AA
- Football – Class A
- Golf – Class A
- Softball – Class A
- Boys Tennis – Class AA
- Track and Field – Class AA
- Volleyball – Class A
- Wrestling – Class AA
