= Huntingdon and Broad Top Mountain Railroad and Coal Company =

American short line railroad company

Huntingdon and Broad Top Mountain Railroad (H&BTM) (reporting mark HBTM) is a former short line railroad company operating passenger and freight service on standard gauge track in south central Pennsylvania.

Operational headquarters were in Huntingdon and Saxton, with financial and business offices located in Philadelphia. The primary shop facilities were located in Saxton; auxiliary car shop facilities were at Huntington. Turntables were located at Huntingdon, Saxton and Mount Dallas, Pennsylvania.

== History ==
=== Construction ===
The Huntingdon and Broad Top Mountain Railroad and Coal Company was chartered on May 6, 1852, and organized on January 10, 1853. The purpose of the line was to provide a rail link from Huntingdon to Bedford, and to provide a competitive alternate route to local coal producers to break the Baltimore and Ohio Railroad's monopoly on coal that was being shipped from the Cumberland, Maryland, area. The existence of high quality semi-bituminous coal in the Broad Top Mountain region was known since colonial times. Before the railroad, wagon or pole barge was the only practical method of bringing the coal from the remote region to market.

The 31 mile portion of the main line from Huntingdon to Hopewell, via Saxton and Riddlesburg, was completed in 1855. On February 3, 1859, the Bedford Railroad Company was chartered to provide a railroad connection for Bedford, and was incorporated February 19, 1859. This company, with financial assistance from the Pennsylvania Railroad (PRR), built a line from Mount Dallas to Hopewell in July 1863, connecting with the H&BTM. It was merged into the H&BTM on August 17, 1864. Total track mileage at the company's height was just over 72 miles.

=== Coal branches ===
A number of branches were built to serve the Broad Top coal fields, beginning as soon as the railroad reached the area in 1853–1855.

- Shoups Run Branch — from Saxton to Broad Top City via Coalmont and Dudley. It was extended to Barnettstown, near Dudley, in 1856. Passenger service was operated on this branch between 1859 and 1917, from Saxton to Dudley only.
- Coalmont Branch — from Coalmont to Hickory Hill
- Miller's Run Branch — from Shoups Branch between Coalmont and Dudley to Kenrock and beyond along Miller's Run. It was built in 1908.
- Six Mile Run Branch — from Riddlesburg to North Point via Defiance and Coaldale The branch was opened to Defiance in 1862 and subsequently extended.
- Shreeves Run Branch — from North Point to Finleyville
- Sandy Run Branch — from Hopewell to the Garlick Mine via Langdondale
- Long's Run Branch — from Langdondale to Kearney. The branch was opened in 1883.
- Kimber Run Branch — from south of Hopewell at the confluence of Kimber Run and the Raystown Branch of the Juniata River up Broad Top Mountain. This branch lasted only a few years at the beginning of the 20th century.

=== Interchanges ===
The H&BTM connected with the PRR at Huntingdon, and with the Bedford and Bridgeport Railroad at Mount Dallas. It operated the B&B via lease in 1871, however the PRR, which had provided the majority of financial backing for the B&B's construction, took over operation of the B&B the following year. The H&BTM would continue to operate passenger service via trackage rights to Bedford over the B&B until 1953, but from 1872 onwards, its southern freight terminus was at Mount Dallas. The B&B was under complete control of the PRR from 1872 onwards but was separated from the contiguous PRR system until 1910, when they completed their Bedford Division between Cessna and Brookes Mills. The H&BTM served as a PRR bridge line for traffic between its two end points until that time. After 1910, the majority of bridge traffic was shifted to the PRR's Bedford Division.

The H&BTM also supported some minor industrial lines, mostly logging railroads and iron ore, as well as the coal-hauling Juniata and Southern Railway, which connected at Marklesburg. Glendale, the terminus of the Sandy Run Branch, originally was an interchange with the narrow gauge Reichley Brothers logging railroad, which operated near Wells Tannery in Fulton County. When the branch was extended from Glendale up Broad Top Mountain in the early 1920s to access the Garlick Mine, the Reichleys abandoned their right of way on the western slope of the mountain and moved their interchange point to the community of Reichley, the location of the brothers' sawmill.

Though similar in name, there was no formal interchange connection or business relationship between the H&BTM and the narrow gauge East Broad Top Railroad. Through the Juniata and Southern Railroad, a physical connection existed at Jacobs, but its doubtful that any cargo was exchanged between the two railroads.

=== Later history ===
The railroad was at its height in the last decades of the 19th century and the pre-World War I period of the 20th century. The completion of the Bedford Division allowed the PRR to divert most of the lucrative through traffic from the Cumberland area away from the H&BTM. The decline of the Broad Top Mountain coal fields, the maturity of construction bonds, and many ill-advised right of way improvements and equipment purchases took their financial toll. The Huntingdon and Broad Top Mountain Railroad declared bankruptcy on October 11, 1953, operated its last passenger train in November 1953 and ceased operations on March 31, 1954.

The Everett Railroad took over the southernmost four miles of H&BTM trackage, between Tatesville and Mount Dallas on April 1, 1954. They operated until 1982, when they closed due to Conrail's abandonment of the remainder of the Bedford Division, by then known as the Conrail's Bedford and Mount Dallas Branches. The trackage was removed in 1985.

The railroad's trackage in Huntingdon, Pennsylvania was sold to the Pennsylvania Railroad. The PRR and its successors Penn Central (PC) and Conrail (CR) operated the track as a means of accessing an industrial park in the Smithfield portion of Huntingdon. Though the northern portion of the trackage remains, it has not been used since the late 1990s.

Roster:

*Note all engine after the second 29 & 28 (listed) had the same 66-inch boilers from Baldwin to make repairs easier

Engine	Wheel Configuration	Build Date	Notes
28&29	2-8-0		2nd set of engines ordered from Baldwin, the previous 28&29 were 4-6-0's, both scrapped
30	4-4-0	32305, November 1907	66-inch drivers, 30-inch front trucks, scrapped 1949 at what is now the B&O Railroad Museum yards.
31&32	2-8-0	1910	51-inch drivers, 30-inch front trucks, 31's & 32's front number plates still exist. Both Scrapped Share the exact same blueprints for 37's & 38's ash pan.
33&34	2-8-0	Late 1910s	51-inch drivers, 30 inch front trucks, Both Scrapped
35&36	4-6-0	1933	30 inch front trucks, no known measurements of the drivers
37&38	2-8-0	59945 & 59946 April 1927	38 is the final engine of the railroad and is owned by Everett Railroad in Hollidaysburg, is currently being restored as of 2022, and 38's unofficial planned completion date is April 2027, the 100th birthday of the engine
M-39	Brill Gas Electric Motor Car, 75 ft	Mid 1920s	Crashed in 1940, turned into passenger car 27, Still exists and is at the Central New York Chapter Museum of the NRHS
40	2-8-0	Unknown	Previously Western Maryland 351 made by Baldwin, not much is known else about this engine, however 51-inch drivers, 30-inch front trucks

== Preservation ==
H&BTM's only surviving locomotive is Number 38, a 1927 Baldwin Locomotive Works 2-8-0. After the H&BTM closed, this locomotive was sold to the Rail City Historical Museum in Sandy Creek, New York. Railway Post Office car 5436, coach 27, caboose 17, and various pieces of tools and other hardware were also acquired and preserved by the museum. Locomotive No. 38 would later be sold to the Livonia, Avon and Lakeville Railroad, which restored it to service, and finally, Sloan Cornell of the Gettysburg Railroad. The locomotive was transferred to Cornell's Knox and Kane Railroad at Marienville, Pennsylvania in the 1980s. After it was removed from tourist service in the 1990s, No. 38 was stored at the Marienville enginehouse, where it received a new tender and H&BT lettering. After the K&K ceased tourist operations, it was moved to Kane, Pennsylvania and stored inside the railroad's expanded enginehouse. However, that structure was burnt in an arson-related fire on March 16, 2008, damaging 38 in the process. The locomotive was sold at auction to Alan Maples, the owner of the Everett Railroad on October 10, 2008, and is starting to be restored as of 2022.

The last surviving piece of revenue freight equipment was G-22 gondola 3807, which had been sold to the Bellefonte Central Railroad in the late 1930s. Converted to a work car, it was scrapped in the 1980s.

Caboose 15 is at the Williams Grove Historical Steam Association's park in Williams Grove, Pennsylvania. Caboose 16 is now at the Railroad Museum of Pennsylvania previously owned by Larry Williams of Saxton, Pa who owns H&BT engine 31's Baldwin Number plate. Caboose 17 survived after Rail City's closure; its current whereabouts are unknown, although it is believed to be in New England. RPO 5436 was scrapped on the grounds of Rail City. Coach 27 was acquired by the Central New York Chapter of the National Railway Historical Society and is preserved at their Central Square Station Museum.

Depots still exist at Riddlesburg (converted to a church), Everett (along with the separate freight house structure), Hopewell and Dudley (the latter being the depot from Broad Top City, Pennsylvania. The Dudley water tank, an enclosed wooden structure, remains as well.
