= Pennsylvania Route 913 =

State highway in Pennsylvania, US

Pennsylvania Route 913

Route information
- Maintained by PennDOT
- Length: 17.690 mi (28.469 km)

Major junctions
- West end: PA 26 in Saxton
- East end: PA 655 in Taylor Township

Location
- Country: United States
- State: Pennsylvania
- Counties: Bedford, Huntingdon, Fulton

Highway system
- Pennsylvania State Route System; Interstate; US; State; Scenic; Legislative
← PA 911	→ PA 914

Pennsylvania Route 913 (PA 913) is a 17.7-mile-long (28.5 km) state highway located in Bedford, Huntingdon, and Fulton counties in Pennsylvania. The western terminus is at PA 26 in Saxton. The eastern terminus is at PA 655 in Taylor Township.

== Route description ==
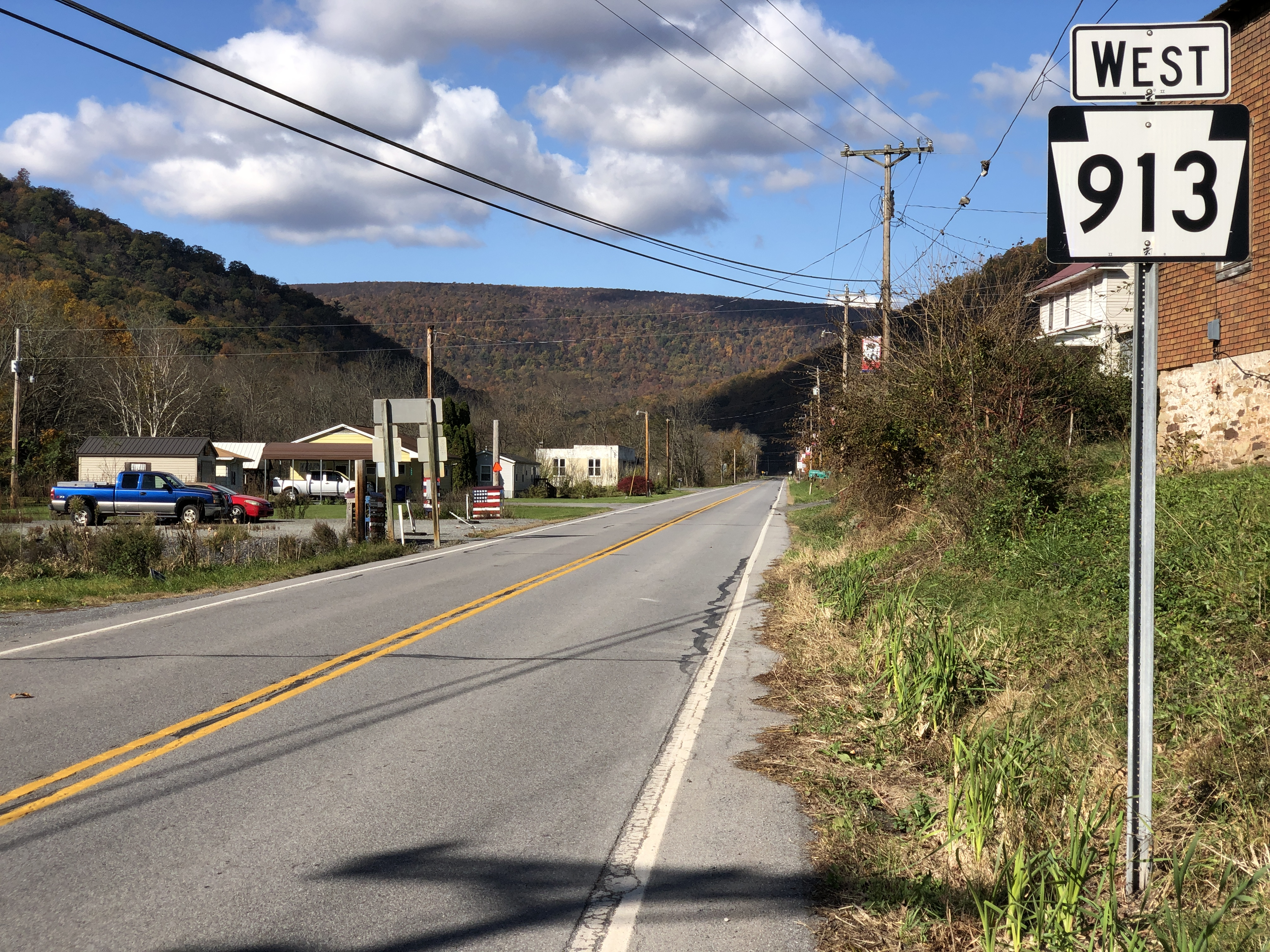
PA 913 westbound past PA 655 in Waterfall

PA 913 begins at an intersection with PA 26 in Liberty Township, Bedford County, heading east on a two-lane undivided road. The route runs through farmland, crossing the Raystown Branch Juniata River and running through a portion of the Raystown Lake National Recreation Area. The road curves northeast and passes homes in the community of Stonerstown, where it turns to the southeast. PA 913 turns to the east and heads into the borough of Saxton, where it becomes Main Street and runs past more residences before heading through the commercial downtown. The route turns north onto 6th Street and passes more home before crossing back into Liberty Township. At this point, the road becomes Saxton Road and Broad Top Mountain Road and curves northeast into wooded areas with some homes.

PA 913 crosses into Hopewell Township in Huntingdon County and heads east through more rural areas with some residences. The road crosses Shoups Run at Puttstown and heads southeast through woodland, turning northeast into Carbon Township. The route curves east before turning southeast in Middletown past more rural homes. PA 913 passes through woodland before heading into the borough of Coalmont and becoming Barnett Road, passing a few homes and turning to the east. The route heads back into Carbon Township again and becomes Broad Top Mountain Road and curves northeast into wooded areas with some homes, passing through more woods. The road turns south and enters the borough of Dudley, passing more scattered homes and becoming Main Street, curving east. PA 913 heads back into Carbon Township and runs through forests, turning southeast into the borough of Broad Top City and becoming Railroad Avenue. In this area, the route curves east and passes several residences. The road crosses into Wood Township and becomes North Main Street, heading southeast through more forests. PA 913 turns to the south and heads into the residential community of Robertsdale, where it heads southwest briefly before a turn to the south. The route heads back into forested areas and curves southeast before turning south.

PA 913 heads into Wells Township in Fulton County and becomes New Grenada Highway, turning east into a mix of farmland and woodland with some homes in the community of New Grenada. The road heads into wooded areas and passes to the north of Sideling Hill Creek, briefly heading through Clay Township and Wood Township, Huntingdon County before entering Taylor Township, Fulton County. PA 913 passes through farm fields with some homes prior to ending at PA 655 in Waterfall.

== Major intersections ==
County	Location	mi	km	Destinations	Notes
Bedford	Liberty Township	0.000	0.000	PA 26 (Raystown Road) – Everett, Huntingdon	Western terminus
Huntingdon	No major junctions				
Fulton	Taylor Township	17.690	28.469	PA 655 (Waterfall Road) – Saltillo, Hustontown	Eastern terminus
1.000 mi = 1.609 km; 1.000 km = 0.621 mi
