= Puttstown, Pennsylvania =

Unincorporated community in Pennsylvania, US

- Unincorporated community
- Location within Pennsylvania Location within the United States
- Coordinates: 40°22′48″N 78°23′44″W
- Country: United States
- State: Pennsylvania
- County: Huntingdon
- Township: Hopewell
- Founded: 1840

Government
- Time zone: UTC-5 (Eastern (EST))
  - Summer (DST): UTC-4 (EDT)
- ZIP code: 16678
- Area code: 814

Puttstown is an unincorporated community in Hopewell Township in southwestern Huntingdon County, Pennsylvania, United States. The community is situated along Pennsylvania Route 913, east of Saxton, near the Huntingdon-Bedford County line.

== History ==
The small community was first established in 1840, when Henry Putt erected a homestead and a grist mill adjacent to Shoups Run. It was first a log mill, with one run of stones that were quarried on Broad Top Mountain. It was propelled by water from Shoup's Run. In 1853 the old log mill was taken down and a framed structure erected on its site by Levi Putt, a son of Henry. In this there are three run of burr stones. By 1880, Puttstown had developed a grist mill, a tannery and about 30 dwellings.
