= Coaldale =

Coaldale may refer to:

== Canada ==
- Coaldale, Alberta
  - Coaldale (Rednek Air) Aerodrome

== United States ==
- Coaldale, Colorado
- Coaldale, Nevada
- Coaldale, Bedford County, Pennsylvania
- Coaldale, Schuylkill County, Pennsylvania
- Coaldale, West Virginia
