= Broad Top Township, Pennsylvania =

Township in Pennsylvania, US

Coordinates: 40°04′18″N 78°15′19″W

- Township
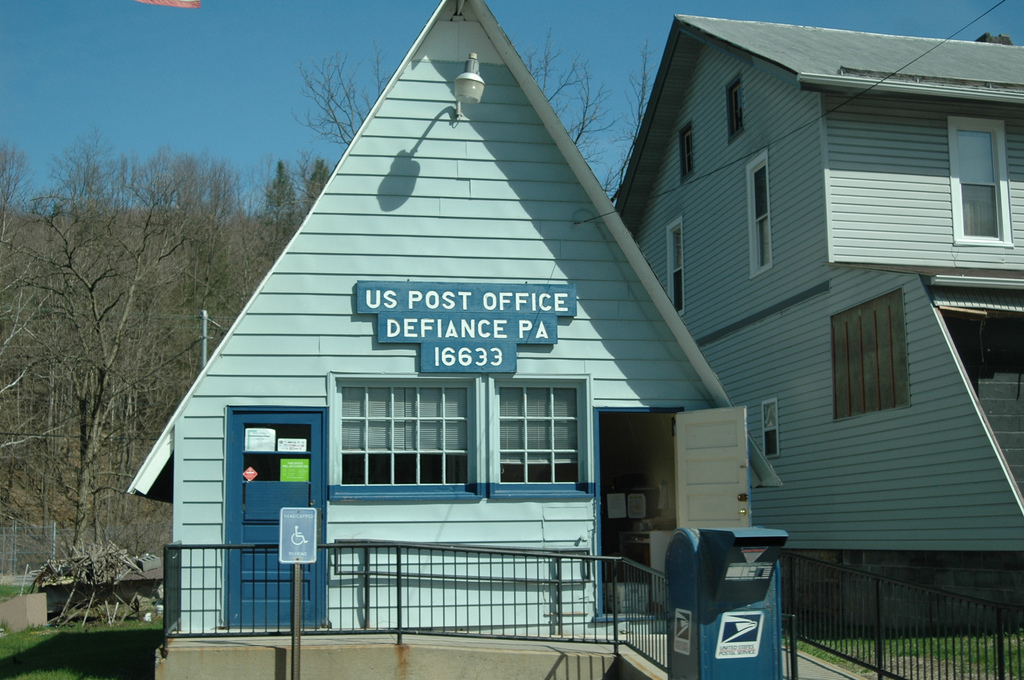
- The post office in Defiance, Broad Top Township

- Seal

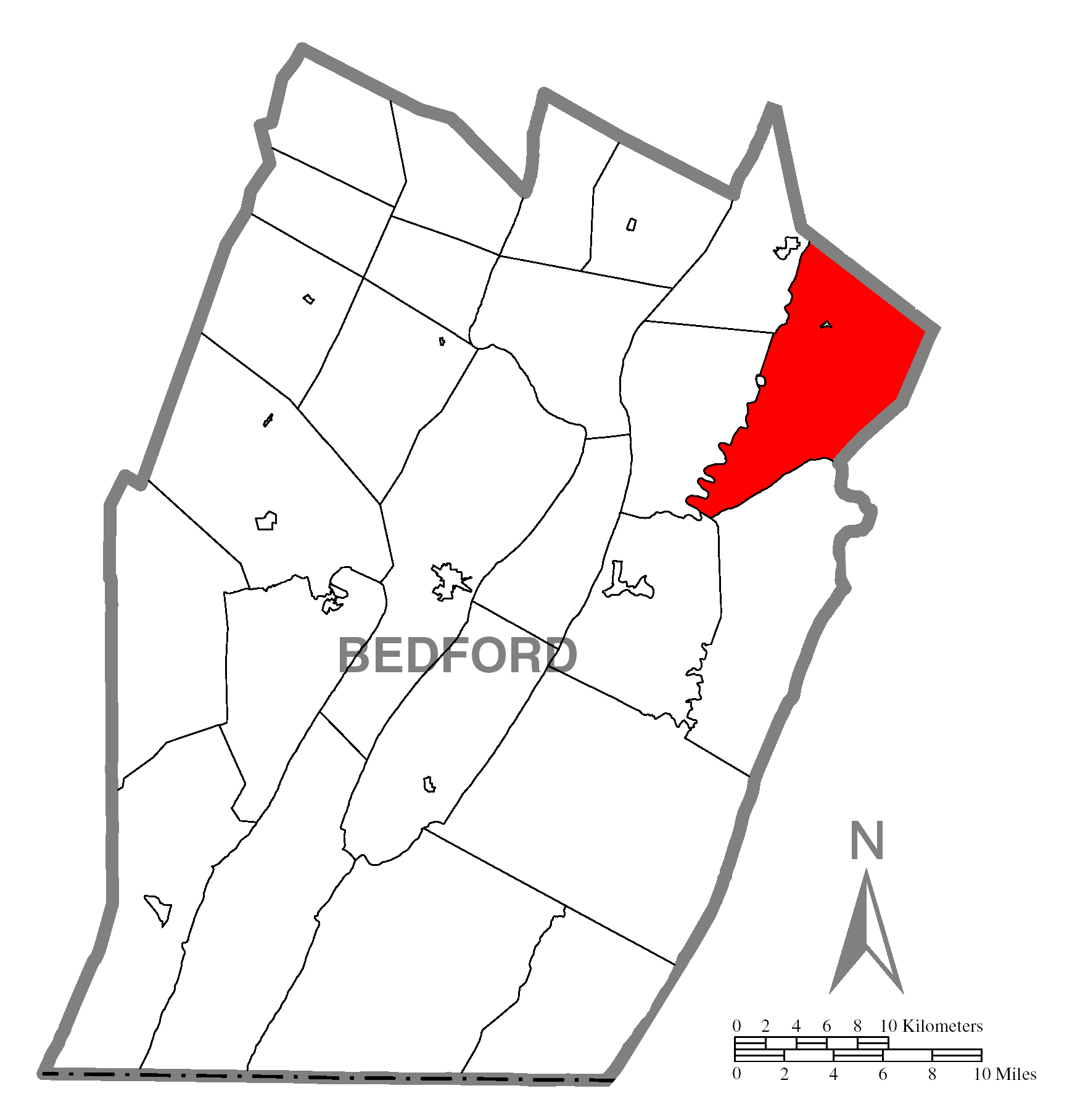
- Map of Bedford County, Pennsylvania highlighting Broad Top Township

- Map of Bedford County, Pennsylvania
- Country: United States
- State: Pennsylvania
- County: Bedford
- Settled: 1785
- Incorporated: 1838

Area
  - Total: 48.48 sq mi (125.57 km^{2})
  - Land: 48.17 sq mi (124.77 km^{2})
  - Water: 0.31 sq mi (0.79 km^{2})

Population (2020)
  - Total: 1,440 ▼
  - Estimate (2023): 1,449
  - Density: 33.9/sq mi (13.09/km^{2})
- Time zone: UTC-5 (Eastern (EST))
  - Summer (DST): UTC-4 (EDT)
- Area code: 814
- FIPS code: 42-009-08880
- Website: BROAD TOP TOWNSHIP

Broad Top Township is a township in Bedford County, Pennsylvania, United States. The population was 1,440 at the 2020 census.

== General information ==
- ZIP codes: 16678, 16679
- Area code: 814
- Local telephone exchanges: 635, 928

== Geography ==
Broad Top Township is located in northeastern Bedford County, situated on a portion of the Broad Top plateau. Most of its western boundary follows the Raystown Branch of the Juniata River, and its southern boundary follows the ridgecrest of Harbor Mountain.

The township is bordered to the south by East Providence Township, to the southwest by West Providence Township, to the west by Hopewell Township, and to the northwest by Liberty Township. To the north is Huntingdon County, with Hopewell Township touching at Broad Top Township's northernmost point, Carbon Township to the north, and Wood Township to the northeast. To the east, in Fulton County, is Wells Township.

The township includes the unincorporated community of Defiance. The boroughs of Coaldale and Hopewell are each surrounded by but are not part of Broad Top Township.

According to the United States Census Bureau, the township has a total area of 48.5 square miles (125.6 km^{2}), of which 48.2 square miles (124.8 km^{2}) is land and 0.31 square miles (0.8 km^{2}), or 0.63%, is water.

== Recreation ==
A portion of the Buchanan State Forest along the eastern border of the township with Taylor Township, and the entire Pennsylvania State Game Lands Number 261 is located in the township southeast of Hopewell.

== Demographics ==
Historical population
Census	Pop.	Note	%±
2010	1,687		—
2020	1,440		−14.6%
2023 (est.)	1,449		0.6%
U.S. Decennial Census

As of the census of 2000, there were 1,827 people, 708 households, and 523 families residing in the township. The population density was 37.9 inhabitants per square mile (14.6/km^{2}). There were 888 housing units at an average density of 18.4/sq mi (7.1/km^{2}). The racial makeup of the township was 99.12% White, 0.22% African American, 0.16% Native American, 0.16% Asian, and 0.33% from two or more races. Hispanic or Latino of any race were 0.33% of the population.

There were 708 households, out of which 31.9% had children under the age of 18 living with them, 58.5% were married couples living together, 8.9% had a female householder with no husband present, and 26.1% were non-families. 23.3% of all households were made up of individuals, and 10.6% had someone living alone who was 65 years of age or older. The average household size was 2.57 and the average family size was 2.98.

In the township the population was spread out, with 24.3% under the age of 18, 8.7% from 18 to 24, 27.9% from 25 to 44, 24.0% from 45 to 64, and 15.2% who were 65 years of age or older. The median age was 39 years. For every 100 females, there were 103.0 males. For every 100 females age 18 and over, there were 104.9 males.

The median income for a household in the township was $30,250, and the median income for a family was $33,289. Males had a median income of $29,280 versus $18,229 for females. The per capita income for the township was $14,781. About 10.0% of families and 13.1% of the population were below the poverty line, including 11.6% of those under age 18 and 14.1% of those age 65 or over.
