= Tatman =

Tatman may refer to:

== People ==
- Pete Tatman (born 1945), American football player
- TimTheTatman (born 1990), American live streamer and YouTube personality
- Ryan Roberts (baseball) (born 1980), American baseball player nicknamed Tatman

== Other uses ==
- Tatman Run, stream in the U.S. state of Pennsylvania
- Tatman Formation, geologic formation in the U.S. state of Wyoming
