= Bloody Run (Raystown Branch Juniata River tributary) =

River in Pennsylvania, United States

Coordinates: 40°00′36″N 78°22′16″W

Bloody Run is a 1.4-mile-long (2.3 km) tributary of the Raystown Branch Juniata River in Bedford County, Pennsylvania, in the United States.

Bloody Run flows down a valley between Tussey Mountain and Warrior Ridge, and enters the Raystown Branch in Everett, Pennsylvania.

== History ==
The creek acquired its name from the rather gruesome battles of the area in the 1750s during the French and Indian War, as well as from the many travelers who were killed by the Indians who had a settlement on the site of the town eventually named after the creek. Bloody Run was laid out on June 15, 1795, by Michael Barndollar, who purchased 400 acres (1.6 km^{2}) which included the Bloody Run creek. This early town was named Waynesburg in honor of George Wayne, but the post office bore the title of Bloody Run. The town held the name Waynesburg until 1860, when it was officially changed to Bloody Run. On or about the year 1875, at a borough election, the majority of voters adopted the new town name of Everett, after statesman and orator Edward Everett, one-time governor of Massachusetts and president of Harvard University, who is best known as the speaker opposite Abraham Lincoln at the reading of the Gettysburg Address.

== Today ==
Today, there are many events and organizations named after this tributary. "The Bloody Run Historical Society was formed to preserve the history of the community of Everett (Bloody Run) and maintain the properties at the Everett Train Station." The Raystown Canoe Club organizes the Bloody Run Canoe Classic. Another example of name use is the Bloody Run 10k run and 5k walk.

== See also ==
- List of rivers of Pennsylvania
- Bloody Run Canoe Classic
