= Saxton Nuclear Generating Station =

Decommissioned nuclear power plant in Pennsylvania

Saxton Nuclear Experiment Station
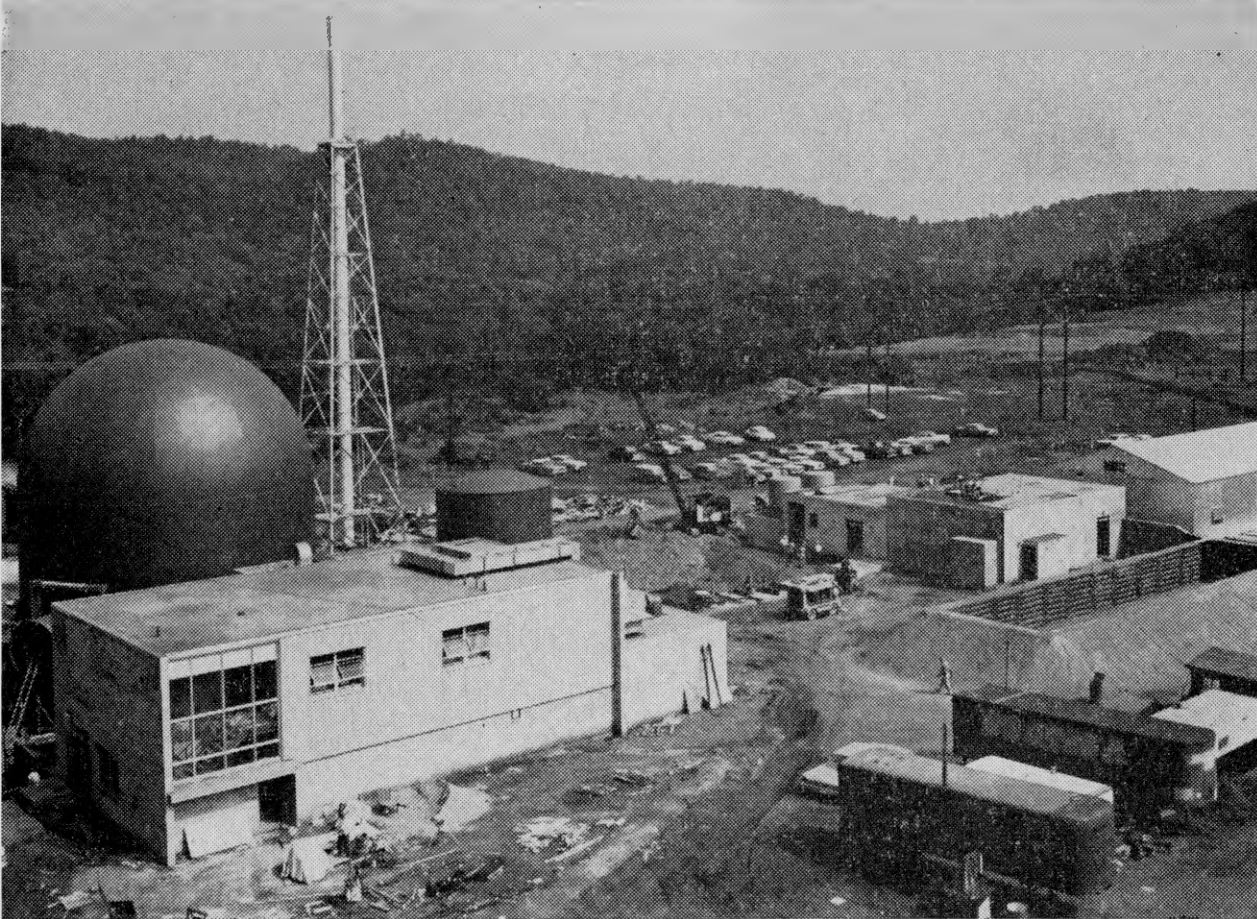
- The Saxon nuclear power plant under construction in 1961. The hemispherical-topped structure to the left housed the nuclear reactor.
- Country: United States
- Location: Liberty Township, Bedford County, near Saxton, Pennsylvania
- Coordinates: 40°13′37″N 78°14′31″W
- Status: Decommissioned; site released for unrestricted use
- Construction began: 1960
- Commission date: November 1961
- Decommission date: May 1972
- Owners: Saxton Nuclear Experimental Corp (SNEC) and GPU Nuclear
- Operators: Saxton Nuclear Experimental Corp (SNEC) and GPU Nuclear

Nuclear power station
- Reactor type: Pressurized Water Reactor
- Reactor supplier: Westinghouse

Power generation
- Nameplate capacity: 23.5 MW-thermal

External links
- Commons: Related media on Commons

The Saxton Nuclear Experiment Station, also known as the Saxton Nuclear Generating Station or Saxton Nuclear Experimental Corporation Facility, was a small nuclear power plant located in Bedford County, near Saxton, Pennsylvania.

== Design ==
The Saxton nuclear power plant was a small, light water, pressurized water reactor. The plant was sited immediately east of an existing coal fueled electricity generating plant, the 1923 Saxton Steam Generating Station, to share systems and components; the nuclear power plant did not have its own turbine or generator.

The nuclear reactor and associated systems were designed and constructed by Westinghouse Electric Corporation; nuclear fuel was likewise fabricated and supplied by Westinghouse from allocations of uranium-235 provided by the Atomic Energy Commission. The reactor coolant system contained a single loop of piping and components, including the reactor vessel, reactor coolant pump, pressurizer, and steam generator. Unlike some contemporary low pressure and low temperature pressurized water reactors (e.g. the Westinghouse TR-2), Saxton operated at pressures and temperatures typical of later commercial nuclear reactors; nominal reactor coolant system pressure was 2,250 psig and reactor vessel average temperature of 493 degrees Fahrenheit. As the facility was designed to perform testing and development functions, a superheated steam test loop was among the reactor's features. Additional equipment included process systems piping and components, a water filled spent fuel pool, and an overhead polar crane.

The reactor vessel and reactor coolant system were housed inside of a steel containment vessel. The steel containment vessel was a right cylinder topped by a hemispherical dome with an embedded semi-hemispherical lower head. The containment vessel was 109 feet tall by 50 feet in diameter. To provide radiological shielding and protection from environmental hazards, approximately 50 percent of the structure was below the surrounding grade. Underground tunnels connected the containment vessel and enclosed systems to other facilities and the adjacent steam plant.

The plant was located in a elbow of the Raystown Branch Juniata River, approximately 3/4 mile north of downtown Saxton.

== Nuclear fuel ==
The Saxton reactor was unique and notable in its early, routine use of mixed oxide fuels, use of fuel assemblies with different fuels together in the same core, and use of fuels with differing cladding materials. By way of example, the second core loading contained fuel assemblies of the following attributes:

- stainless steel clad low enriched uranium oxide (UO_{2});
- Zirconium clad mixed plutonium oxide (PuO_{2}) - uranium oxide (UO_{2});
- Zirconium / stainless steel clad PuO_{2} - UO_{2}.

The stainless steel, Zirconium, and Zirconium / stainless steel fuel rods were contained within cylindrical fuel "cans" fabricated of perforated stainless steel. The cans were in turn held in a 9 x 9 rod position matrix in fuel assemblies with a square cross section. Fuel assemblies included positions for control rods, instrumentation, and other inserts; fuel assemblies contained between 32 and 72 individual fuel rods. The Saxton core held a total of 21 fuel assemblies.

== Operation ==
Construction began in February 1960 on the Saxton Nuclear Experimental Generating Station. The facility was privately financed. Westinghouse Electric Corporation designed and built the reactor. By the end of 1960, construction was about 35 percent complete. Construction was essentially complete in late 1961. The plant was connected to an existing turbine generator at the immediately adjacent Saxton Steam Generating Station of Pennsylvania Electric Company for production of electrical power.

The plant received its Atomic Energy Commission license to begin operations November 15, 1961.

It had a net power output of 23.5 MW-thermal and 3.25 MW-electric, and its purposes were primarily to research various aspects of nuclear reactor technology and to train personnel. Major areas of research for the plant were the chemical control of reactivity using boron and the use of MOX fuel. The plant hosted many reactor operator trainees from SNEC and customers of Westinghouse. Routine plant operation was more focused on operator training exercises such as reactor shut downs and startups than maximizing electrical generation. For example, in July 1969 the reactor was shut down and then brought back to criticality 79 times to provide training opportunities.

== Shutdown and decommissioning ==
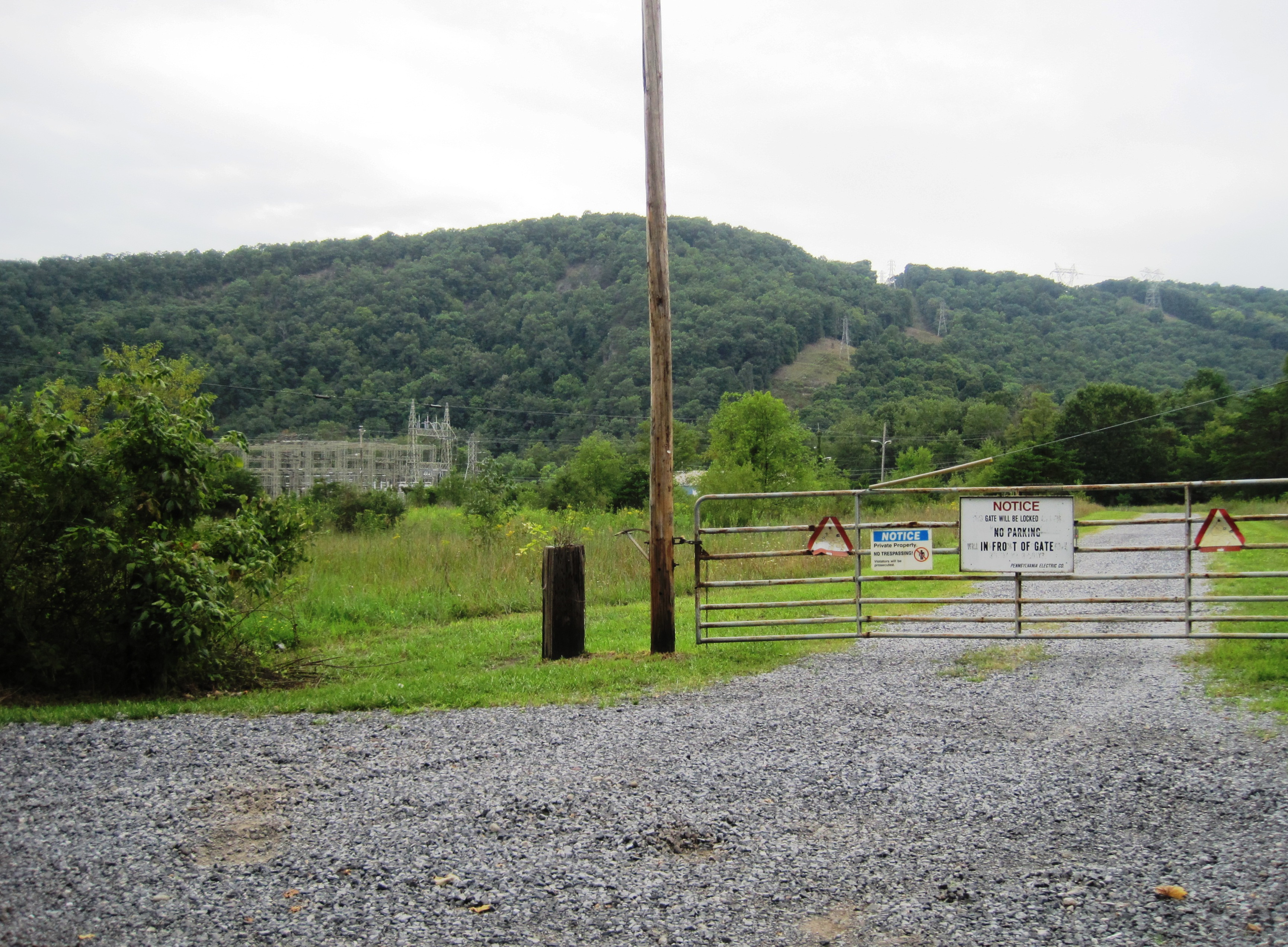
August 2024 photo of the former plant site

The plant was shut down in May 1972 and decommissioned. After shutdown, the reactor fuel was removed from the facility and shipped to the Department of Energy Savannah River Site in South Carolina.

All site decommissioning, decontamination, and remediation work was completed by 2005. Other than some electrical infrastructure which remains as part of the local electricity grid, above ground structures were demolished and removed.

== Owners/operators ==
The owners/operators of the facility were Saxton Nuclear Experimental Corporation (SNEC) and, ultimately through a series of mergers, General Public Utilities Nuclear. Saxton Nuclear Experimental Corporation was a consortium of Mid-Atlantic electrical utilities interested in nuclear power.

== Status ==
On November 7, 2005, the Nuclear Regulatory Commission terminated Facility Operating License Number DPR-4 on NRC Docket No. 50-146 and released the site for unrestricted use.

== See also ==
- List of nuclear reactors
