= Warriors Path State Park =

State park in Bedford County, Pennsylvania

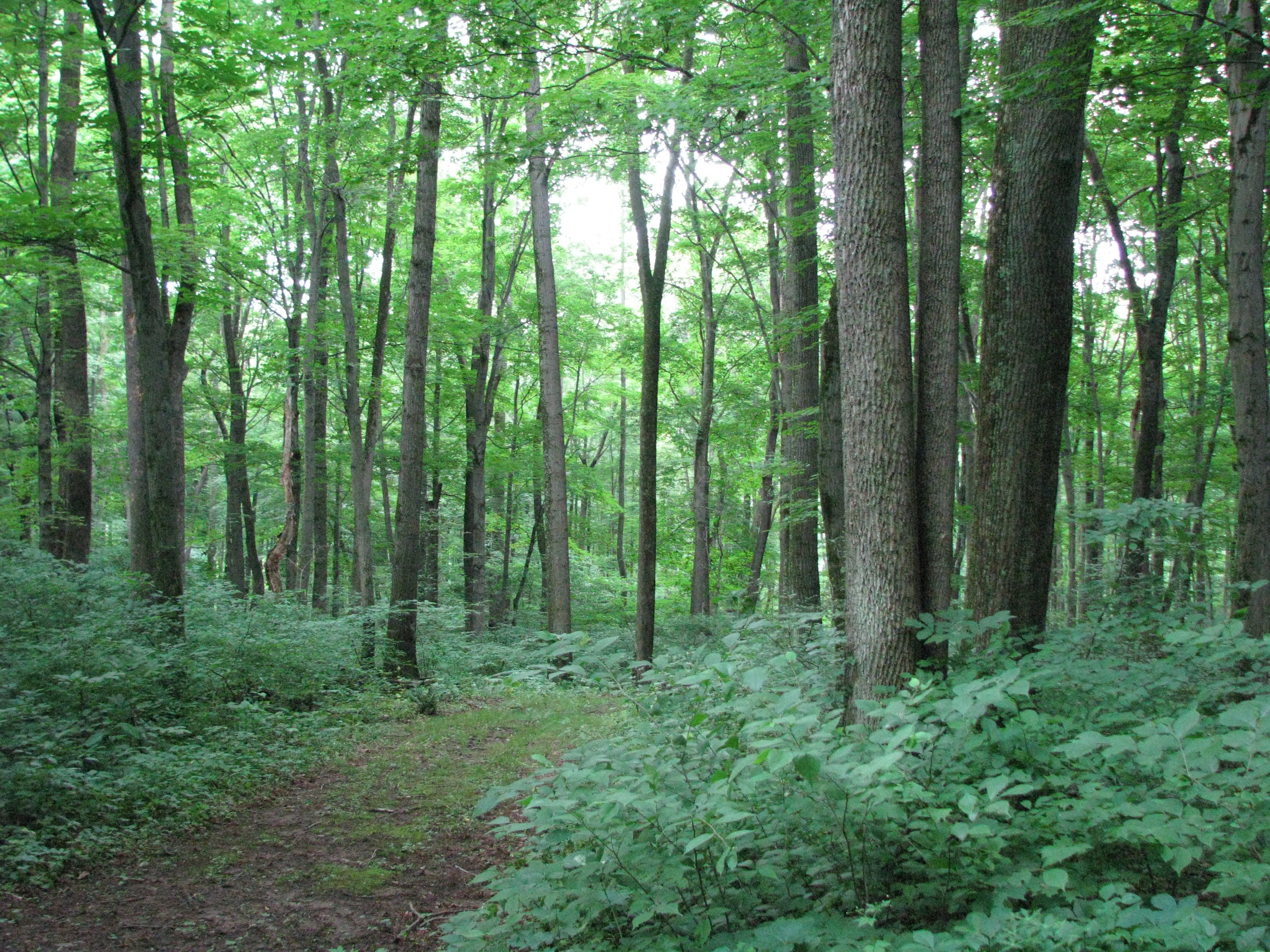

- Location within Pennsylvania Location within the United States
- Interactive map of Warriors Path State Park
- Location: Liberty Township, Bedford County, Pennsylvania, United States
- Coordinates: 40°11′34″N 78°14′57″W
- Area: 349 acres (141 ha)
- Elevation: 883 feet (269 m)
- Established: 1965
- Administrator: Pennsylvania Department of Conservation and Natural Resources
- Website: Official website
- Pennsylvania State Parks

Warriors Path State Park is a Pennsylvania state park on 349 acres (141 ha) in Liberty Township, Bedford County, Pennsylvania, in the United States. It is named for the Great Indian Warpath that was used by the Iroquois in war raids with the Cherokee and other tribes. Warriors Path State Park is surrounded on three sides by the Raystown Branch Juniata River. The park is a seasonal day use park. The park can be accessed by foot from the main gate when the gate is closed November through mid-April.

The land for the park was acquired in three main parcels between 1959 and 1964. A stone with a bronze marker remembers the gift by Mr. and Mrs. Samuel Bussard of one parcel, stating that the land will "be maintained and used as a park forever". 282 acres (114 ha) were originally purchased from the Nimchishin family in 1959. Mr. Nimchishin lived on the remaining 37 acres (15 ha) until his death, but sold that land to the state in 1987 and it became part of the park.

== Raystown Branch of the Juniata River ==
The Raystown Branch of the Juniata River is accessed from the park for fishing and boating. The river is home to smallmouth and rock bass, carp, sucker, eel, catfish, walleye, and muskellunge. The waters of the river are usually too shallow for motorboating during the summer months, but Raystown Branch is ideal for canoes, rafts and other small boats. All boats must have a current registration with any state. Backflow from the river has created a fresh water swamp that provides habitat for wood ducks, river otter and mallards.

== Trails ==
The trails of Warriors Path State Park are open to hiking and cross-country skiing. The trails also provide access to the woods for hunters during hunting season. All hikers and skiers are asked to wear blaze orange during the hunting seasons.

== Hunting ==
Hunting is permitted at Warriors Path State Park. Hunters are expected to follow the rules and regulations of the Pennsylvania State Game Commission. The common game species are ruffed grouse, squirrels, turkey, white-tailed deer, pheasant, and rabbits. The hunting of groundhogs is prohibited.
