= Corbin Bridge =

- U.S. National Register of Historic Places
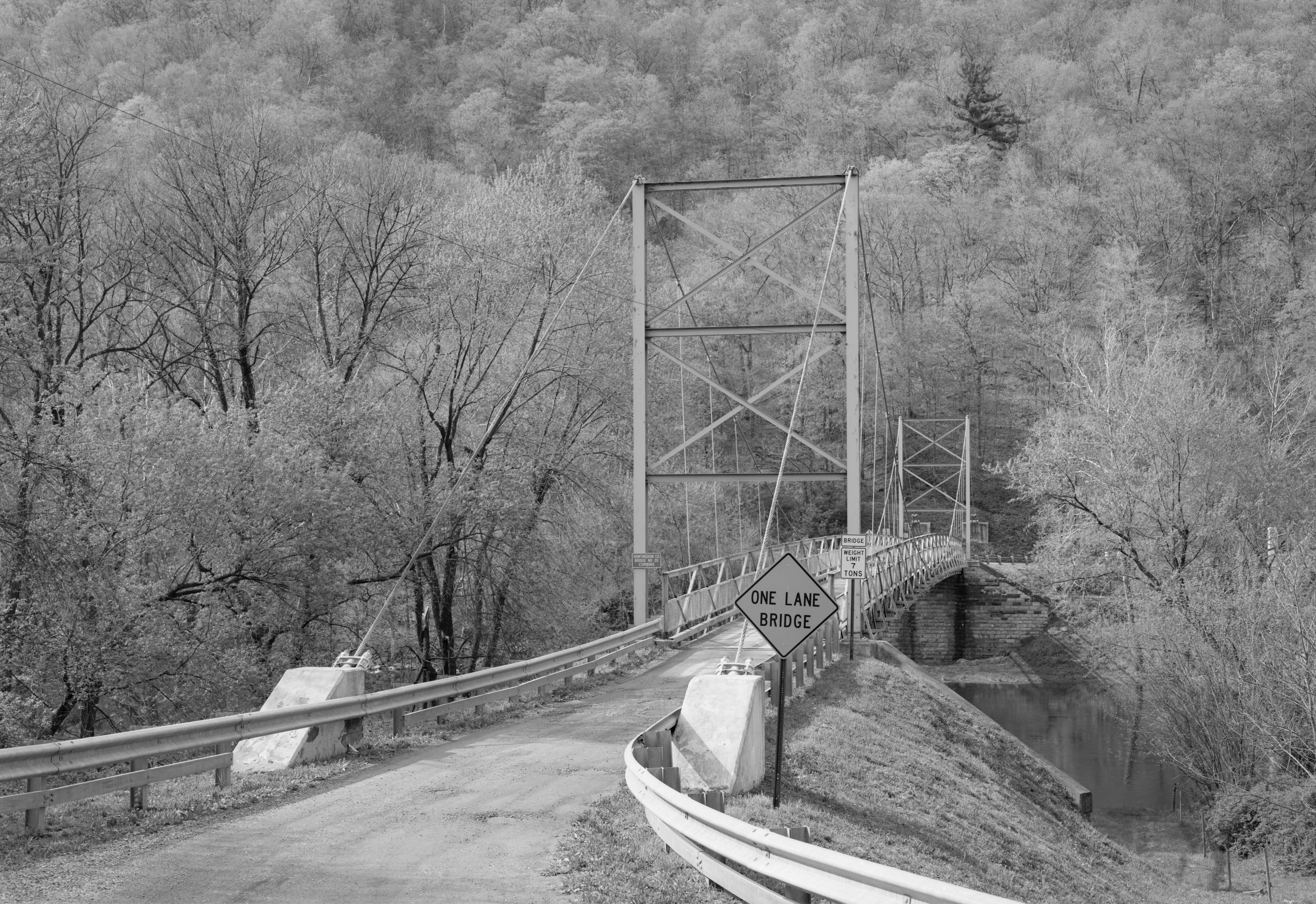
- Corbin Bridge, May 1989

- Location within Pennsylvania Location within the United States
- Location: Township Road 428 over the Raystown Branch, southwest of Huntingdon and 0.5 miles (0.80 km) west of its confluence with the Juniata River, Juniata Township, Pennsylvania
- Coordinates: 40°27′17″N 77°58′59″W
- Area: less than one acre
- Built: 1937
- Architect: Reading Steel Products Inc.
- Architectural style: Suspension bridge
- MPS: Industrial Resources of Huntingdon County, 1780-1939 MPS
- NRHP reference No.: 90000402
- Added to NRHP: March 20, 1990

Corbin Bridge, also known as Huntingdon County Bridge No. 20, is a historic suspension bridge spanning the Raystown Branch Juniata River and located at Juniata Township, Huntingdon County, Pennsylvania. It was built by the Reading Steel Products Inc. in 1937. It measures 322-foot-long (98 m) and has a 12.5-foot-wide (3.8 m) deck. It is the only road suspension bridge in Huntingdon County.

It was added to the National Register of Historic Places in 1990.

== See also ==
- List of bridges documented by the Historic American Engineering Record in Pennsylvania
