= Billy Clapper =

American basketball coach

Current position
- Record: 38–112 (.253)

Biographical details
- Born: December 25, 1982 (age 43)

Playing career
- 2001–2002: Mount Aloysius
- 2004–2005: Youngstown State
- Position: Guard

Coaching career (HC unless noted)
- 2005–2006: Penn State Altoona (asst.)
- 2006–2007: Indiana State (grad asst.)
- 2007–2009: Pitt Johnstown (asst.)
- 2009–2015: Penn State Altoona
- 2015–present: IMG Academy

Head coaching record
- Overall: 38–112 (.253)

Billy Clapper (born December 25, 1982, in Altoona, Pennsylvania) is an American basketball coach at IMG Academy in Bradenton, Florida. He is a basketball camp clinician and skills instructor; having worked with numerous NBA players and overseas professional players. He was the head men's basketball coach at Penn State Altoona from 2009 to 2015.

== Coaching career ==
After 10 seasons coaching at the college level, Clapper joined the basketball coaching staff at IMG Academy in 2015. This position has included being a coach for the post-graduate and varsity teams, delivering basketball camps, and offering skills instruction to players of all ages. A number of his players have been chosen in the NBA draft.

He was hired as the head coach of the Penn State Altoona Lions on September 16, 2009. Clapper was relieved of his position on March 26, 2015, after six seasons as the head coach of the Lions, a member of the Allegheny Mountain Collegiate Conference and an NCAA Division III institution. The Lions had a combined 38–112 record during his six seasons. The Lions had seven all-conference selections: Zach Spitz (2010), Kirk Peters (2010, 2011), Matt Gehret (2013), and Durant Harvin (2013). He coached the school's only all-region selection, Kirk Peters (2011), and one AMCC defensive player of the year, Matt Gehret (2013). In the spring of 2015, senior forward Joel Redfoot was honored by the National Association of Basketball Coaches as a member of its All State/NABC Good Works Team at the NCAA Final Four in Indianapolis, Indiana.

His coaching career began as an assistant at Penn State Altoona under Alan Seretti in 2005–2006. The program had seven victories that season and the team was led by Tyler Franklin, the program's all-time scoring leader. During the 2006–2007 season, he was a member of the coaching staff at Indiana State University under Coach Royce Waltman. The Sycamores earned 13 victories on the season and had victories over three NCAA tournament participants: Butler, Creighton, and Purdue.

He joined the coaching staff of Bob Rukavina at the University of Pittsburgh at Johnstown prior to the 2008–2009 season and during the next two seasons he helped guide the Mountain Cats to a 47–16 record. They were crowned WVIAC regular-season champions in 2008 and tournament champions in 2009. They advanced to the NCAA tournament during both seasons (2008 – second round and 2009 – first round). He coached two players that earned All-American honors– Chris Gilliam (2007) and Marcus Tullis (2008), whom went on to have professional basketball careers overseas.

== The Basketball Tournament ==
In 2014, Clapper became Coach and General Manager of Sideline Cancer that plays annually in The Basketball Tournament. In the inaugural "winner takes all" $500,000 tournament took place in Philadelphia Sideline Cancer earned its first TBT victory over Team FOE and finished with a 1–1 record advancing to the 2nd round. The team playing in honor of The Greg and Cathy Griffith Family Foundation raises awareness to find a cure for pancreatic cancer. After the first TBT, Clapper moved solely into the General Manager role and has continued in that position.

The franchise is one of only a few of the original 32 TBT teams that remain today and is the only to participate in each of the tournaments. Over the years, the team has compiled a 14–9 record, earned 5 Sweet 16 berths (2014, 2015, 2019, 2020, 2021), 2 Elite selections (2020, 2021), and a championship game appearance (2020). The team has been highlighted over the years by professional players, many whom have starred overseas. This list includes former NCAA scoring champion Marcus Keene, and Indiana Hoosiers guard Maurice Creek. The team has had five former NBA players participate Jamel Artis, Diante Garrett, CJ Miles, Daniel Santiago, and Diamond Stone.

== Playing career ==
Clapper played high school basketball at Tussey Mountain HS (Saxton, Pennsylvania) until his senior season. He attended Hollidaysburg Area HS (Hollidaysburg, Pennsylvania) during his senior year where he was a member of the basketball team. His high school career was full of team success as his teams won four league titles, a district title, and each year was state ranked.

His collegiate playing career began at Mount Aloysius College where he played his freshman season under Coach Bob Williams. He scored 19 points for the Mounties while appearing in 20 games including one start against Houghton College.

He then transferred to Youngstown State University where he became a manager for the men's basketball team. He spent two years in that role and would become a practice player during that time for the penguins. He earned a spot on Coach John Robic's team prior to his senior season. Clapper appeared in 6 contests for the penguins including starting on senior night against Butler University. He was a two-time Horizon League academic honor roll selection and was named the Tony Vivo hustle award winner upon completion of his senior season.

== Billy Clapper Basketball ==
In 2005, he created his company Billy Clapper Basketball LLC. and began teaching and instructing his own camps throughout the state of Pennsylvania. His website www.BillyClapperBasketball.com is a resource for player improvement drills and training innovation. His company produced the instructional basketball video, Ballhandling at its Best, which demonstrates the ball handling workouts he used during his own playing career. In recent years Billy Clapper Basketball, has created additional basketball training content that is available to players and coaches exclusively online through its YouTube channel.

In 2006, a college skills camp was offered that introduces teaching and training to participants that are to help boys and girls develop the skills to play basketball in college. In 2014, that camp was rebranded as "The College Skills School", each summer it offers players the opportunity to improve their basketball skills and learn team building, leadership, and motivational strategies through its school component.

In 2001, At the age of 17, he began his coaching and teaching career as a basketball camp instructor under Coach John Swogger. During his college years he traveled the eastern United States and instructed on camp staffs at college basketball camps, including Rhode Island, North Carolina State, Penn State, Pittsburgh, Rutgers, West Virginia, Dayton, Duquesne, Xavier, and Louisville. His ball handling and guard skills station became popular amongst boys and girls at these camps throughout the country.
