= Defiance, Pennsylvania =

Village in Pennsylvania, US

- Census-designated place
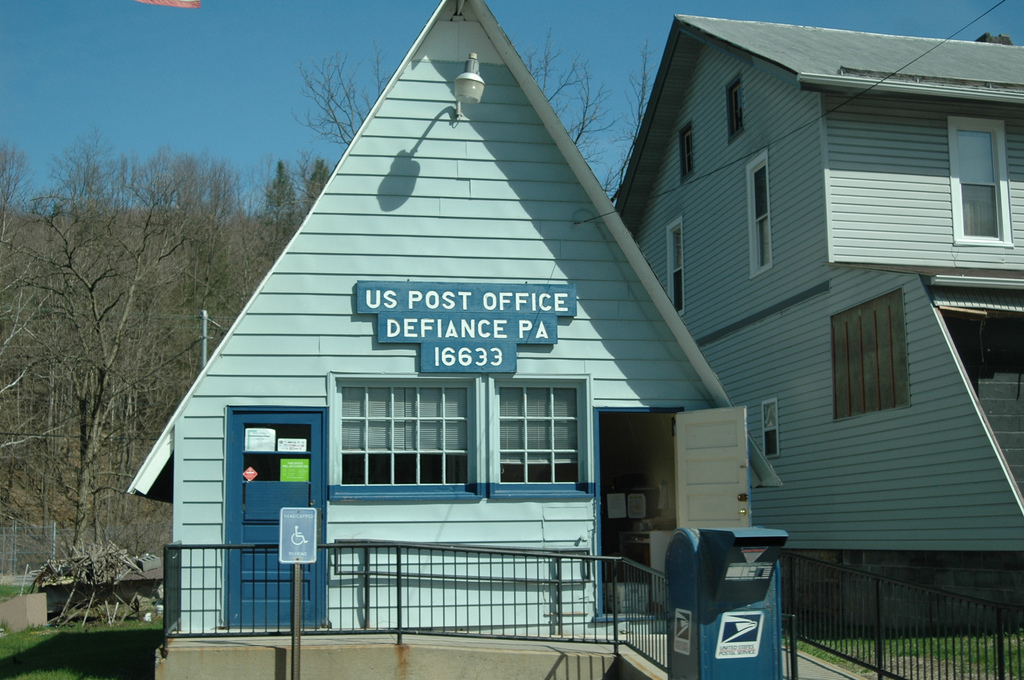
- Post office

- Location within the U.S. state of Pennsylvania
- Coordinates: 40°09′36″N 78°13′54″W
- Country: United States
- State: Pennsylvania
- County: Bedford
- Township: Broad Top

Government
  - Mayor: Amanda Rosewater

Area
  - Total: 0.17 sq mi (0.44 km^{2})
  - Land: 0.17 sq mi (0.44 km^{2})
  - Water: 0 sq mi (0.00 km^{2})
- Elevation: 1,063 ft (324 m)

Population (2020)
  - Total: 196
  - Density: 1,159.7/sq mi (447.78/km^{2})
- Time zone: UTC-5 (Eastern (EST))
  - Summer (DST): UTC-4 (EDT)
- Postal code: 16633
- Area code: 814
- FIPS code: 42-18608
- GNIS feature ID: 2630005

Defiance is a village and census-designated place in Broad Top Township, Bedford County, Pennsylvania, United States. The village was home to 196 residents as of the 2020 census. It is located along Six Mile Run Road (State Route 1036).

The community most likely was named in pioneer days after Fort Defiance.

== Demographics ==
Historical population
Census	Pop.	Note	%±
2020	196		—
U.S. Decennial Census

== Education ==
Public education in Defiance is administered by the Tussey Mountain School District, which operates Defiance Elementary School within the community. Defiance Elementary no longer exists due to consolidation by Tussey Mountain School District. Students are transported to Saxton for curriculum.
