= Bloody Run Canoe Classic =

Community canoe and kayak race

Now known as the Bloody Run Canoe and Kayak Classic (BRCKC) is a community canoe and kayak race along the Raystown Branch of the Juniata River in Everett, Pennsylvania. Historically, this event has comprised a five and nine mile race, with multiple race classes that include "both recreational and competition-class boats".

== Origin and history ==
The Raystown Branch Juniata River Water Trail "hosts the annual Bloody Run Canoe Classic between Bedford, Pennsylvania and Everett, Pennsylvania for both recreational and competition-class boats. The first race took place in 1982 after the founding of the Raystown Canoe Club. Annually held in April or May, there has been good years and bad, like the 1991 race that had high water perfect for racing, but cold weather that put racers at risk for hypothermia. The race was held annually until 2001, when the event was held in conjunction with a Spring Festival and triathlon.

The Bloody Run Canoe Classic returned from a hiatus in 2008 with sponsorship from REI. In addition, community members played a large part helping Raystown Canoe Club to bring this nine-mile race back to life. When revived in 2008, "48 people showed up" and then in 2009 the BRCC attracted more than 60 participants to Everett, Pennsylvania’s local waterways.

The Bloody Run Canoe Classic was named after the original name of its home town, Everett, PA. Everett's original name was 'Bloody Run'. The Raystown Canoe Club owns the rights to and organizes the BRCC.

== Updated communications ==
Previously, the Bloody Run Canoe Classic was only advertised through local radio and newspaper ads. When the BRCC was revived in 2008, new members of the Raystown Canoe Club began targeting people with more tech-savvy media, such as creating a website and a Facebook page. Before these steps were taken, the Raystown Canoe Club and BRCC did not appear when searched with popular online search engines.
