= Riddlesburg, Pennsylvania =

Village in Pennsylvania, US

- Census-designated place
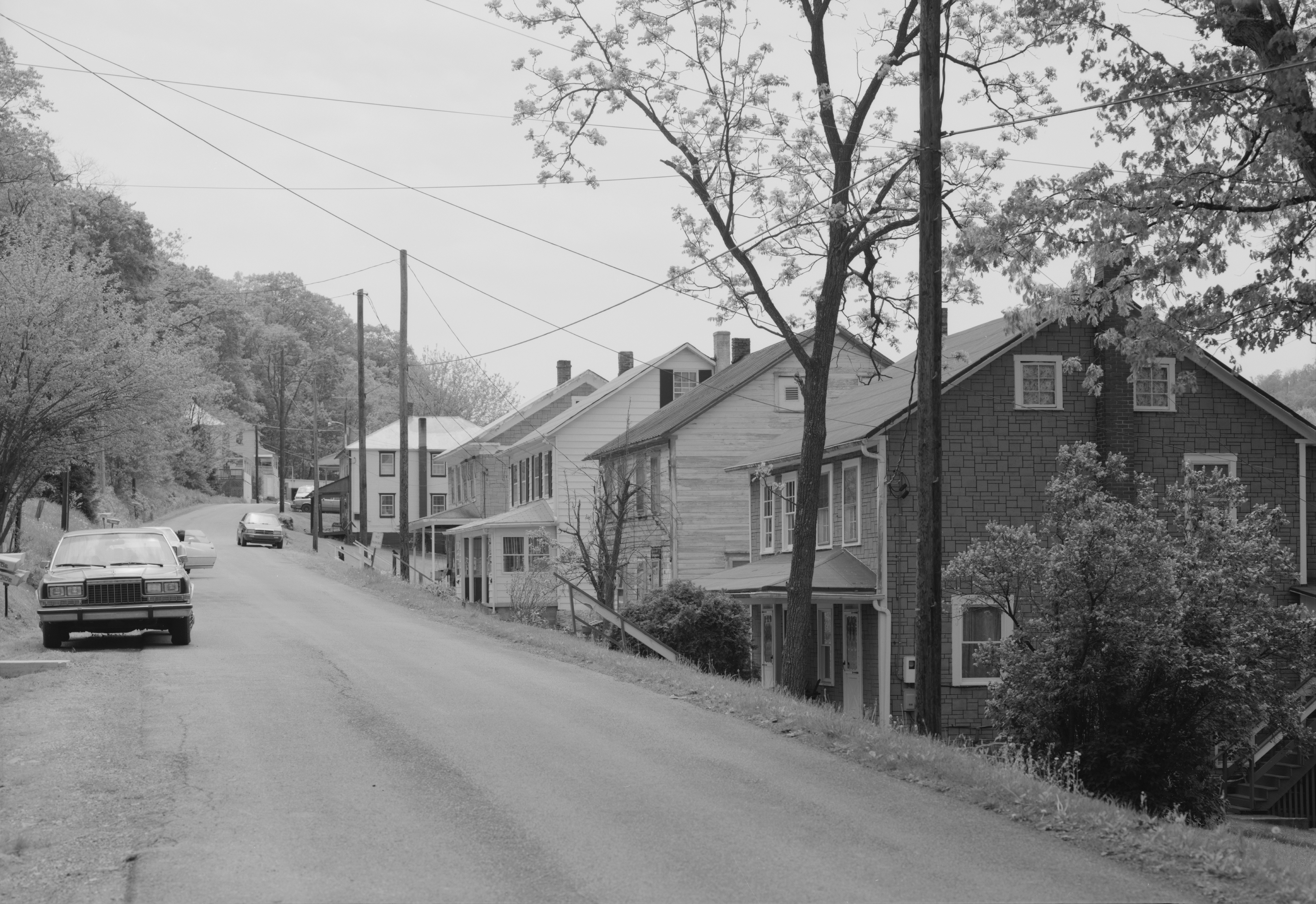
- Old company housing, along Township Route 576

- Location within the U.S. state of Pennsylvania Riddlesburg (the United States)
- Coordinates: 40°09′22″N 78°15′11″W
- Country: United States
- State: Pennsylvania
- County: Bedford
- Elevation: 1,079 ft (329 m)
- Time zone: UTC-5 (Eastern (EST))
  - Summer (DST): UTC-4 (EDT)
- GNIS feature ID: 2830885

Riddlesburg is a small village that is located in Bedford County, in the U.S. state of Pennsylvania. It is situated west of Harrisburg, in the central region of the state.

== History ==
The village features a post office, and an auto garage. There was once a grocery store but it went out of business.

== Geography ==
The main feature of Riddlesburg is the Juniata River that separates the village from Pennsylvania Route 26.

== Demographics ==
Historical population
Census	Pop.	Note	%±

The United States Census Bureau defined Robertsdale as a census designated place (CDP) in 2023.

The 2010 census reported a total population of 187 inhabitants, ninety-four male and ninety-three female, who resided in the 16672 ZIP code. The ZIP code had a land area of 4.33 square miles. The median age was 34.5 years.

There were 118 housing units, with a median home value of $59,100. The median income was $33,636.

High school graduates included 69.5% of the population. At the time of the census, 29.3% of the population lived below the poverty level.

== Gallery ==
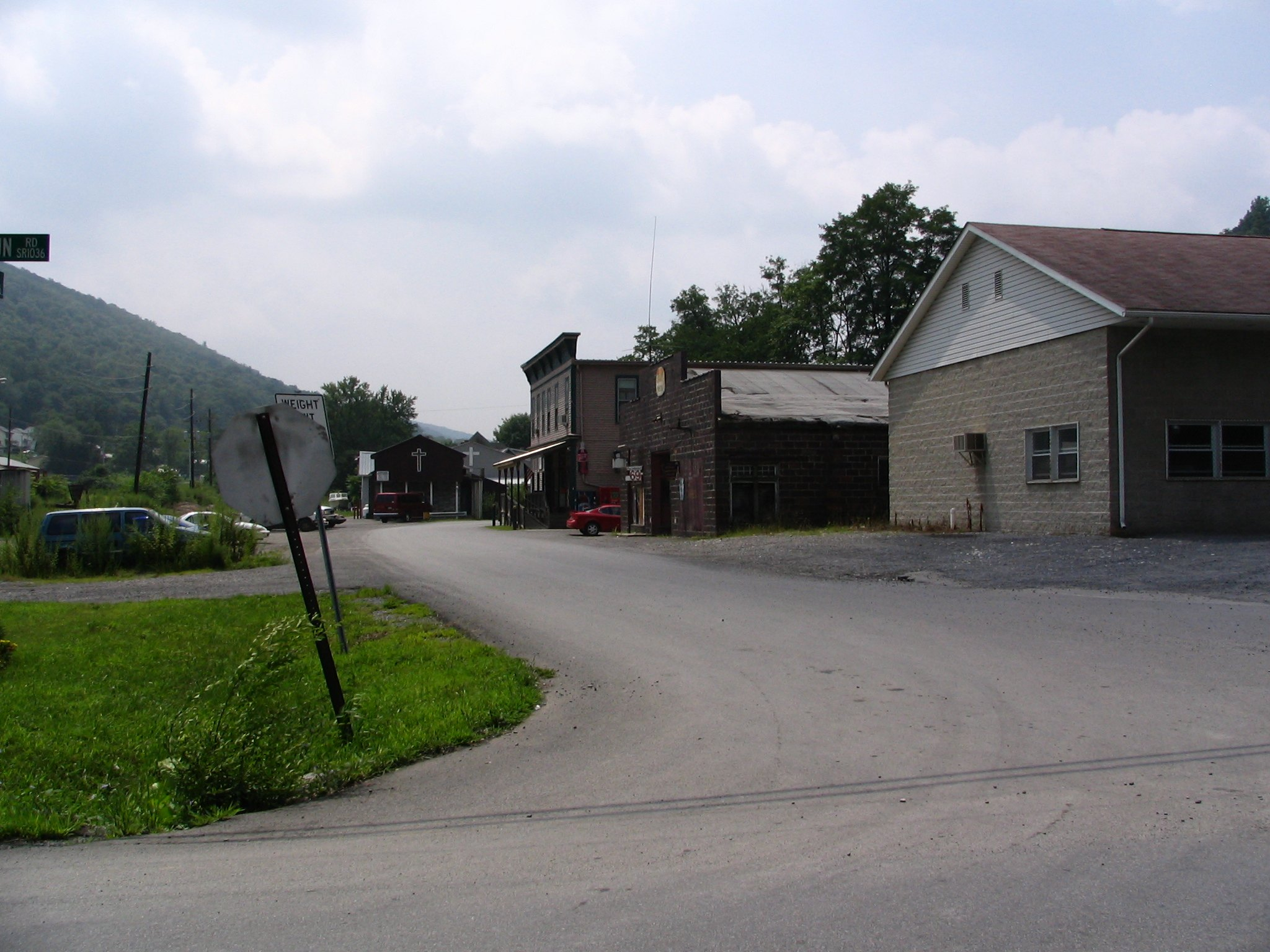
Downtown Riddlesburg

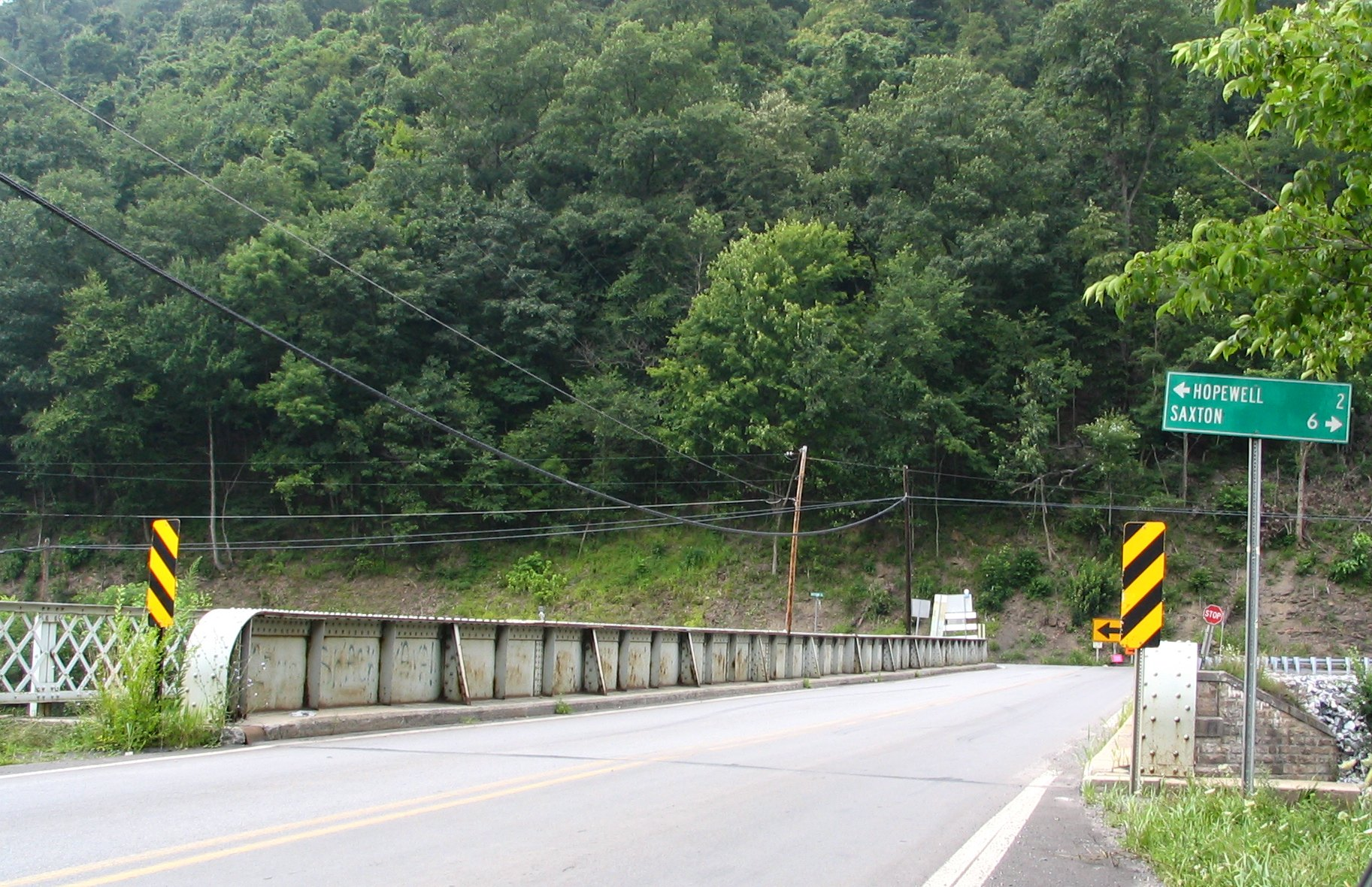
The Riddlesburg Bridge gives access from PA Route 26.
