= Coalmont, Pennsylvania =

Borough in Pennsylvania, US

- Borough
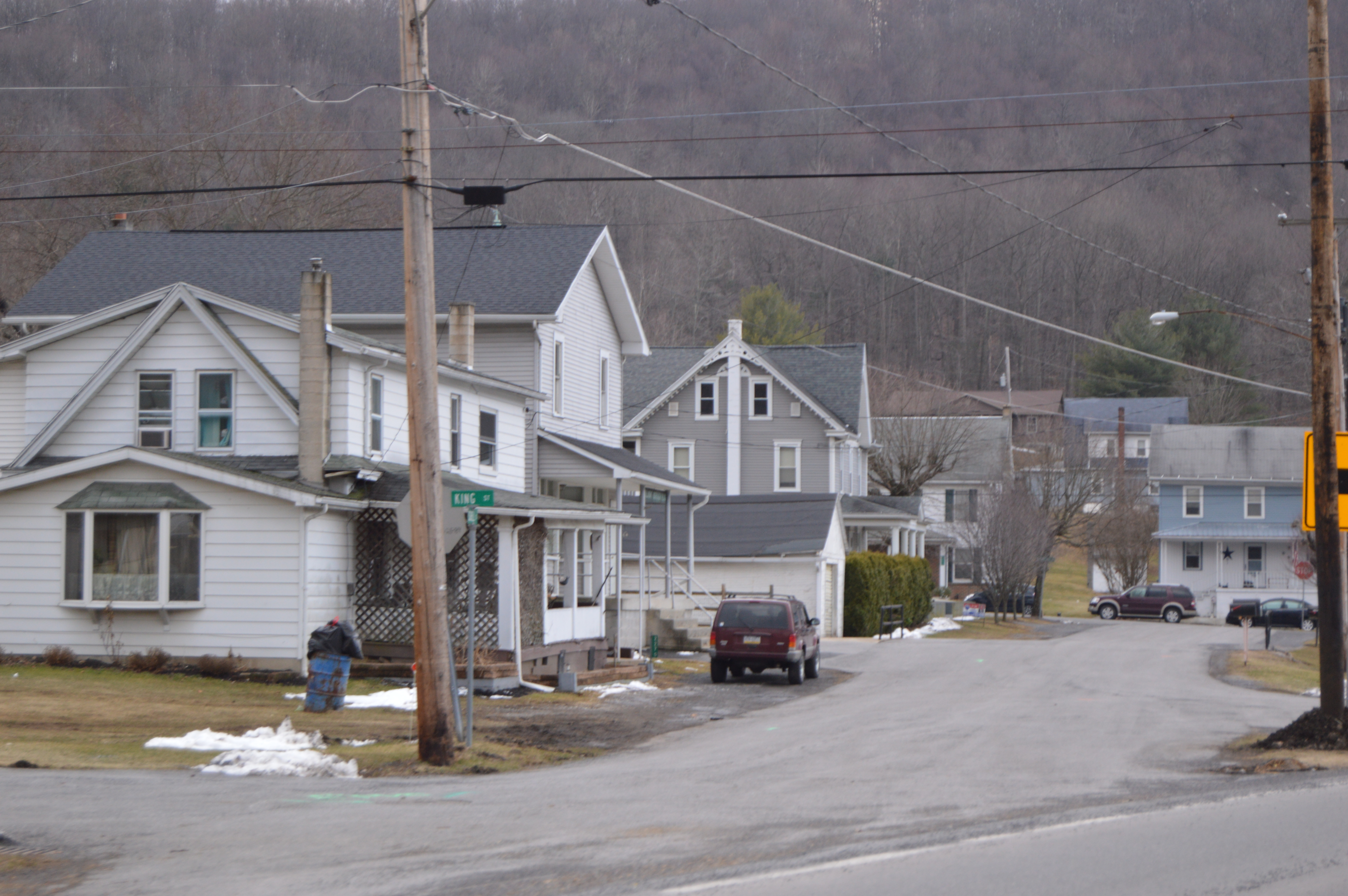
- Scene along Barnett Road

- Location of Coalmont in Huntingdon County, Pennsylvania.

- Location within Pennsylvania Location within the United States
- Coordinates: 40°12′40″N 78°12′00″W
- Country: United States
- State: Pennsylvania
- County: Huntingdon

Government
  - Type: Borough Council
  - Mayor: Pamela McDonald (D)

Area
  - Total: 0.12 sq mi (0.31 km^{2})
  - Land: 0.12 sq mi (0.31 km^{2})
  - Water: 0 sq mi (0.00 km^{2})
- Elevation: 1,106 ft (337 m)

Population (2020)
  - Total: 90
  - Density: 750.3/sq mi (289.69/km^{2})
- Time zone: UTC-5 (Eastern (EST))
  - Summer (DST): UTC-4 (EDT)
- ZIP code: 16678
- Area code: 814
- FIPS code: 42-14640
- GNIS feature ID: 1215268
- Local phone exchanges: 635

Coalmont is a borough in Huntingdon County, Pennsylvania, United States. The population was 91 at the 2020 census.

== Geography ==
Coalmont is located near the southwestern border of Huntingdon County in the valley of Shoup Run, a tributary of the Raystown Branch Juniata River. Pennsylvania Route 913 passes through the center of the borough, leading east (upstream) 2 miles (3 km) to Dudley and west (downstream) 4 miles (6 km) to Saxton.

According to the United States Census Bureau, the borough has a total area of 0.1 square miles (0.26 km^{2}), all land.

== Demographics ==
Historical population
Census	Pop.	Note	%±
1870	189		—
1880	171		−9.5%
1890	219		28.1%
1900	182		−16.9%
1910	228		25.3%
1920	220		−3.5%
1930	159		−27.7%
1940	162		1.9%
1950	207		27.8%
1960	172		−16.9%
1970	129		−25.0%
1980	128		−0.8%
1990	109		−14.8%
2000	128		17.4%
2010	106		−17.2%
2020	90		−15.1%
2021 (est.)	90	Steady	0.0%

As of the census of 2000, there were 128 people, 50 households, and 37 families residing in the borough. The population density was 1,108.2 inhabitants per square mile (427.9/km^{2}). There were 55 housing units at an average density of 476.2 per square mile (183.9/km^{2}). The racial makeup of the borough was 100.00% White.

There were 50 households, out of which 42.0% had children under the age of 18 living with them, 64.0% were married couples living together, 2.0% had a female householder with no husband present, and 26.0% were non-families. 26.0% of all households were made up of individuals, and 18.0% had someone living alone who was 65 years of age or older. The average household size was 2.56 and the average family size was 3.08.

In the borough the population was spread out, with 28.9% under the age of 18, 1.6% from 18 to 24, 36.7% from 25 to 44, 21.1% from 45 to 64, and 11.7% who were 65 years of age or older. The median age was 35 years. For every 100 females there were 93.9 males. For every 100 females age 18 and over, there were 106.8 males.

The median income for a household in the borough was $38,750, and the median income for a family was $52,917. Males had a median income of $30,625 versus $28,750 for females. The per capita income for the borough was $15,260. There were 5.1% of families and 7.6% of the population living below the poverty line, including 11.4% of under eighteens and none of those over 64.
