= Stonerstown, Pennsylvania =

Unincorporated community in Pennsylvania, US

- Census-designated place
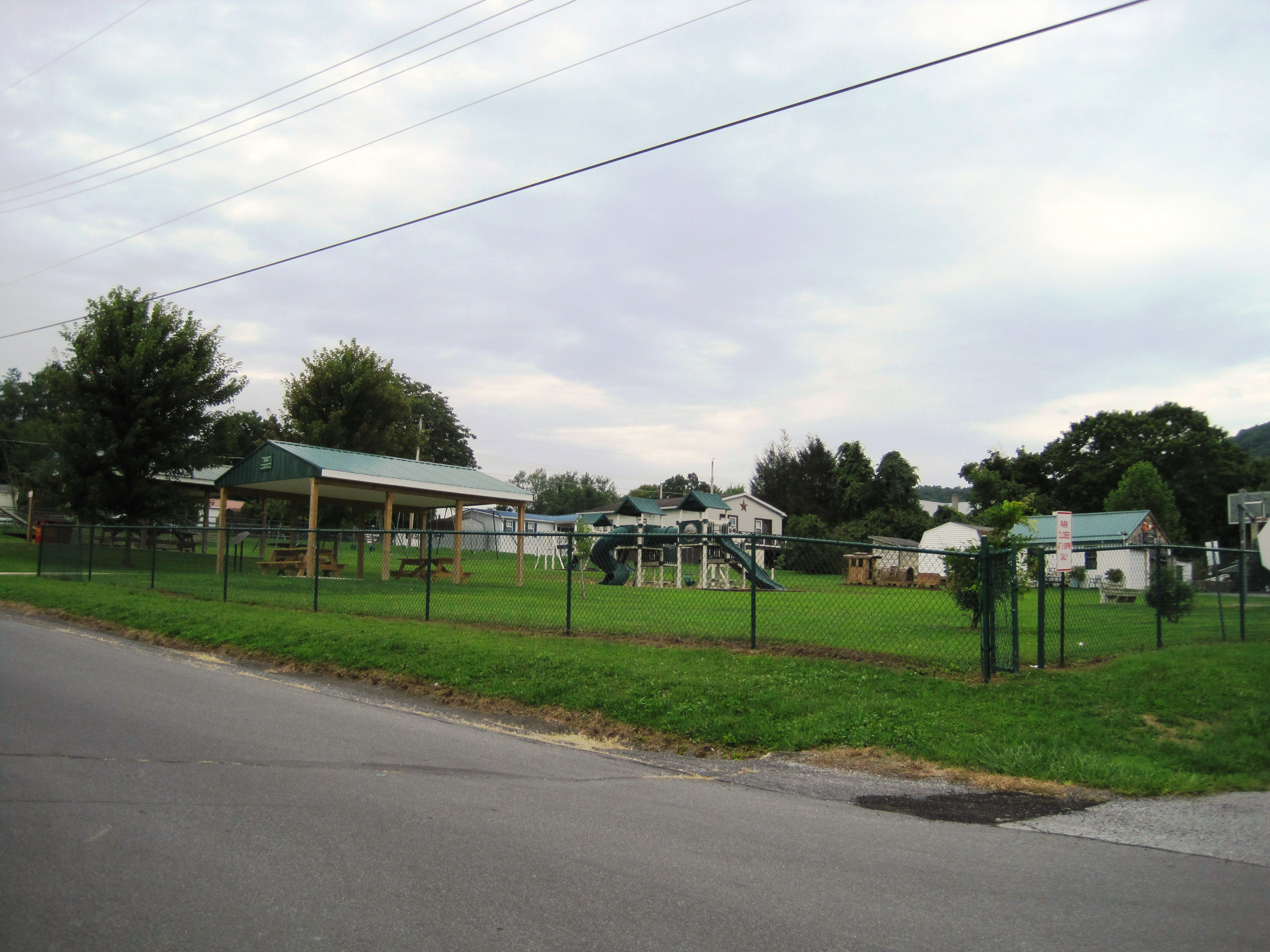
- Park in Stonerstown

- Location in the state of Pennsylvania Stonerstown (the United States)
- Coordinates: 40°12′52″N 78°15′16″W
- Country: United States
- State: Pennsylvania
- County: Bedford
- Township: Liberty

Area
  - Total: 0.35 sq mi (0.9 km^{2})
  - Land: 0.35 sq mi (0.9 km^{2})
  - Water: 0 sq mi (0.0 km^{2})
- Elevation: 889 ft (271 m)

Population (2020)
  - Total: 369
  - Density: 1,060/sq mi (408/km^{2})
- Time zone: UTC-5 (Eastern (EST))
  - Summer (DST): UTC-4 (EDT)
- FIPS code: 42-74360
- GNIS feature ID: 2630041

Stonerstown is a census-designated place in Liberty Township, Bedford County, Pennsylvania, United States. The population was 369 as of the 2020 census. It is located just to the west of the borough of Saxton along Pennsylvania Route 913.
