= Coaldale, West Virginia =

Unincorporated community in West Virginia, United States

- Unincorporated community
- Location within the state of West Virginia Coaldale, West Virginia (the United States)
- Coordinates: 37°21′47″N 81°20′03″W
- Country: United States
- State: West Virginia
- County: Mercer
- Elevation: 2,510 ft (770 m)
- Time zone: UTC-5 (Eastern (EST))
  - Summer (DST): UTC-4 (EDT)
- Area codes: 304 & 681
- GNIS feature ID: 1554163

Coaldale is an unincorporated community in Mercer County, West Virginia, United States. Coaldale is located along U.S. Route 52, 3 miles (4.8 km) northwest of Bramwell.

Coaldale was so named on account of the local coal-mining industry.
