= Tatman Run =

Stream in Pennsylvania, U.S.

Coordinates: 40°18′37″N 78°10′52″W

Tatman Run is a stream in the U.S. state of Pennsylvania.

Tatman Run was named after Joseph Tatman, a pioneer settler.
