= Liberty Township, Bedford County, Pennsylvania =

Township in Pennsylvania, US

Coordinates: 40°15′30″N 78°15′29″W

- Township
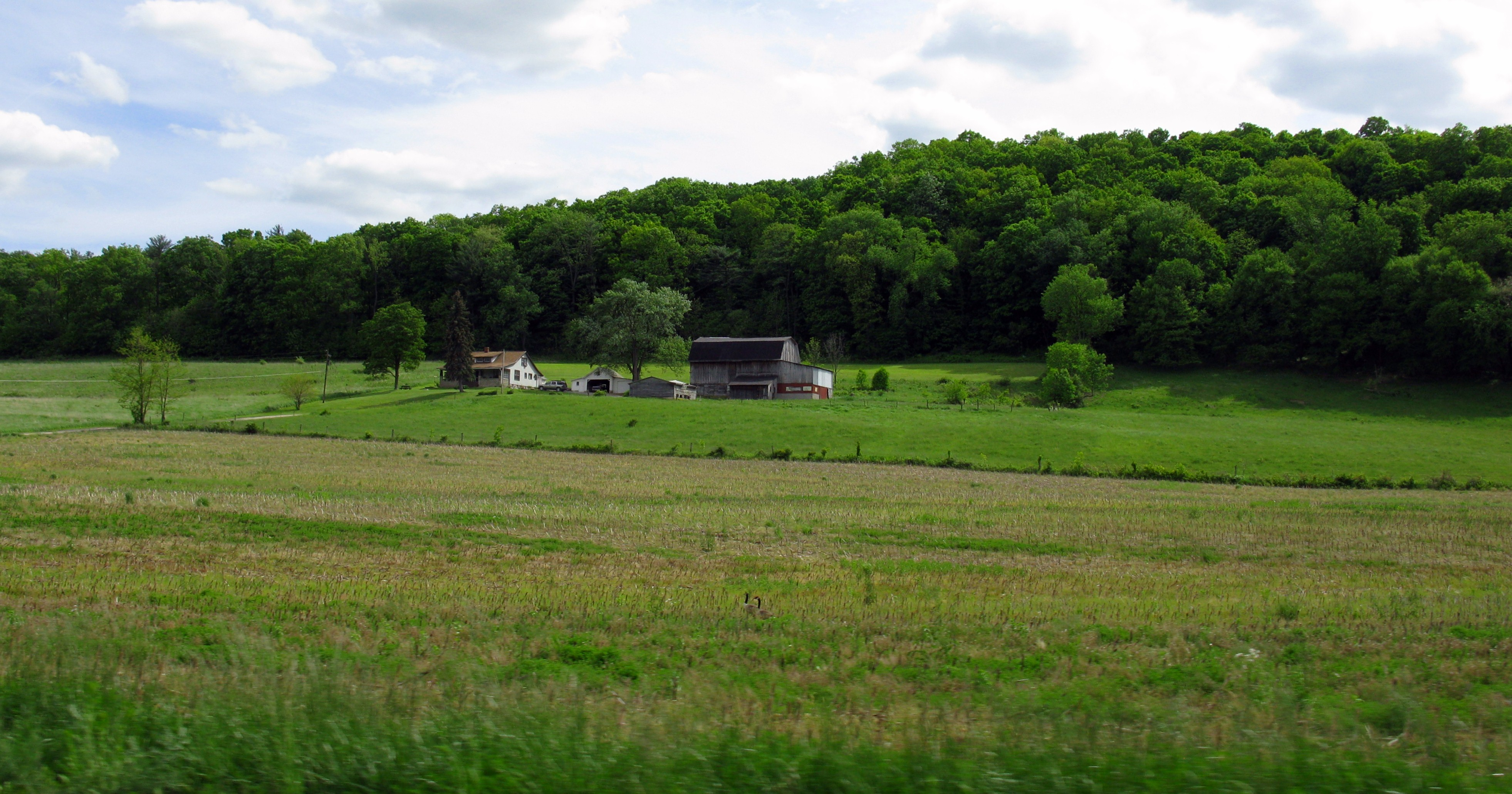
- A farm in Liberty Township

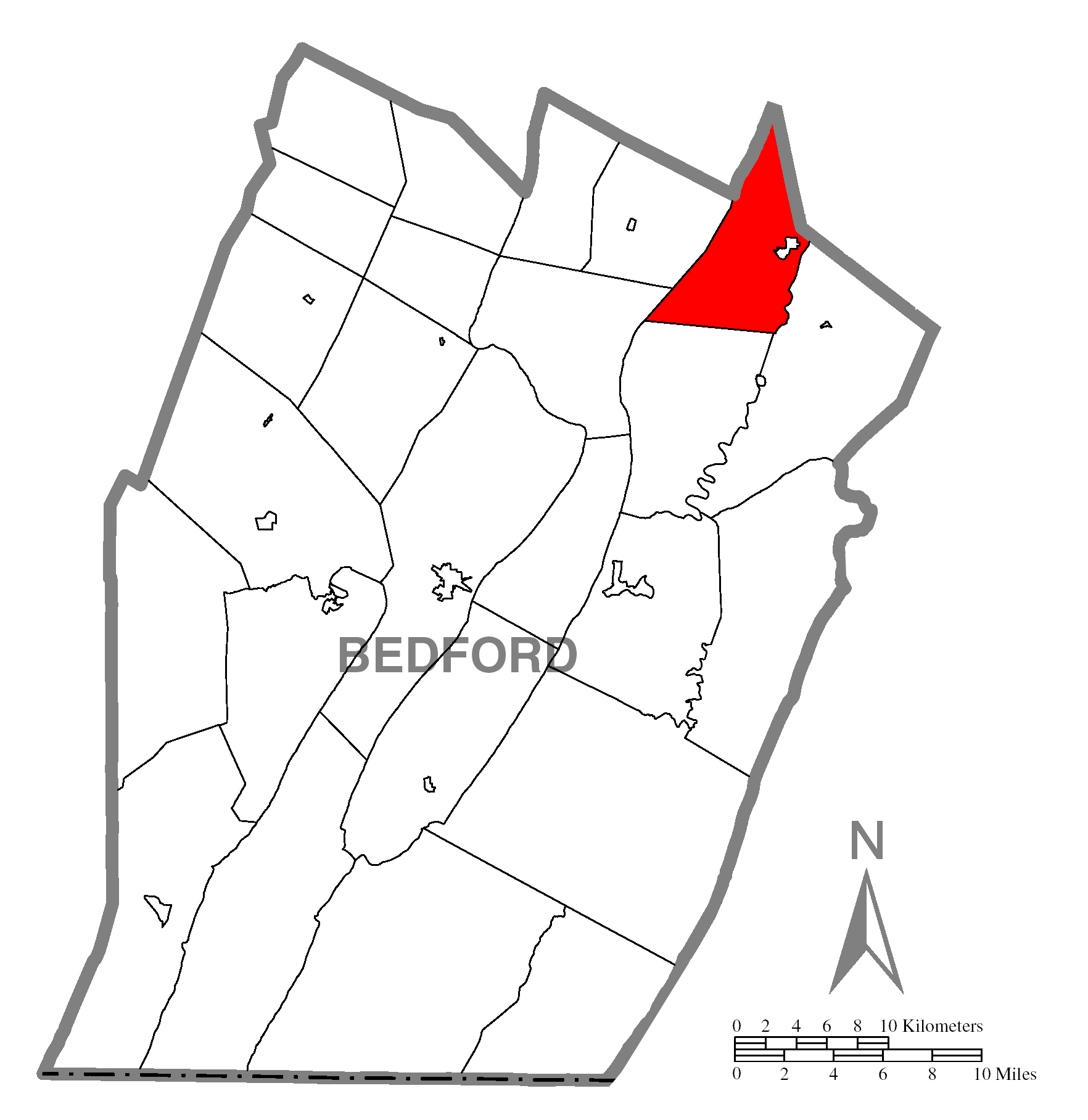
- Map of Bedford County, Pennsylvania highlighting Liberty Township

- Map of Bedford County, Pennsylvania
- Country: United States
- State: Pennsylvania
- County: Bedford
- Settled: 1775
- Incorporated: 1845

Area
  - Total: 26.53 sq mi (68.72 km^{2})
  - Land: 26.19 sq mi (67.82 km^{2})
  - Water: 0.35 sq mi (0.90 km^{2})

Population (2020)
  - Total: 1,383 ▲
  - Estimate (2023): 1,381
  - Density: 49.6/sq mi (19.15/km^{2})
- Time zone: UTC-5 (Eastern (EST))
  - Summer (DST): UTC-4 (EDT)
- Area code: 814
- FIPS code: 42-009-43072

Liberty Township is a township in Bedford County, Pennsylvania, United States. The population was 1,383 at the 2020 census. Warriors Path State Park is located in the township.

== General information ==
- ZIP code: 16678
- Area code: 814
- Local telephone exchange: 635

== Geography ==
Liberty Township is located along the northern border of Bedford County. It includes the unincorporated community of Stonerstown. The borough of Saxton is surrounded by the township but is not part of it. Warriors Path State Park is located south of Saxton, on the inside of a long bend in the Raystown Branch of the Juniata River.

According to the United States Census Bureau, the township has a total area of 26.5 square miles (68.7 km^{2}), of which 26.2 square miles (67.8 km^{2}) is land and 0.35 square miles (0.9 km^{2}), or 1.31%, is water.

== Recreation ==
The Warriors Path State Park and portions of the Pennsylvania State Game Lands Number 73 and Number 108 are located in the township.

== Demographics ==
Historical population
Census	Pop.	Note	%±
2010	1,368		—
2020	1,383		1.1%
2023 (est.)	1,381		−0.1%
U.S. Decennial Census

As of the census of 2000, there were 1,477 people, 597 households, and 445 families residing in the township. The population density was 56.2 inhabitants per square mile (21.7/km^{2}). There were 693 housing units at an average density of 26.4 units per square mile (10.2 units/km^{2}). The racial makeup of the township was 98.78% White, 0.27% African American, 0.14% Asian, and 0.81% from two or more races.

There were 597 households, out of which 30.7% had children under the age of 18 living with them, 61.0% were married couples living together, 11.1% had a female householder with no husband present, and 25.3% were non-families. 21.4% of all households were made up of individuals, and 11.6% had someone living alone who was 65 years of age or older. The average household size was 2.45 and the average family size was 2.85.

In the township the population was spread out, with 22.8% under the age of 18, 7.0% from 18 to 24, 27.2% from 25 to 44, 25.6% from 45 to 64, and 17.3% who were 65 years of age or older. The median age was 41 years. For every 100 females, there were 90.1 males. For every 100 females age 18 and over, there were 87.5 males.

The median income for a household in the township was $32,339, and the median income for a family was $38,207. Males had a median income of $29,402 versus $23,875 for females. The per capita income for the township was $15,468. About 10.9% of families and 13.1% of the population were below the poverty line, including 21.0% of those under age 18 and 13.1% of those age 65 or over.
