= Dudley, Pennsylvania =

Borough in Pennsylvania, US

- Borough
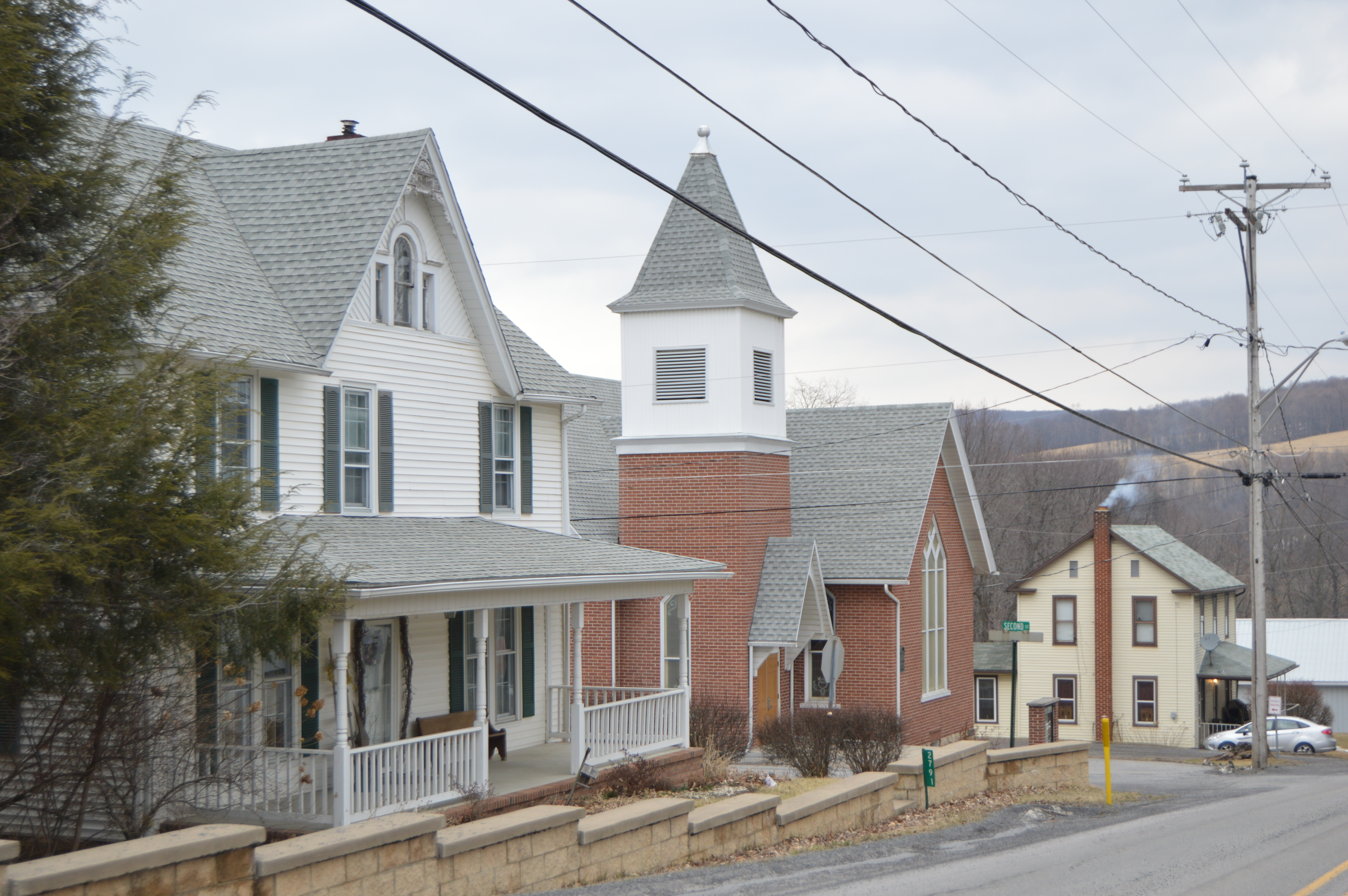
- Houses and the Methodist church

- Location of Dudley in Huntingdon County, Pennsylvania

- Location within Pennsylvania Location within the United States
- Coordinates: 40°12′19″N 78°10′42″W
- Country: United States
- State: Pennsylvania
- County: Huntingdon

Government
  - Type: Borough Council

Area
  - Total: 0.33 sq mi (0.85 km^{2})
  - Land: 0.33 sq mi (0.85 km^{2})
  - Water: 0 sq mi (0.00 km^{2})
- Elevation: 1,457 ft (444 m)

Population (2020)
  - Total: 184
  - Density: 560/sq mi (216.4/km^{2})
- Time zone: UTC-5 (Eastern (EST))
  - Summer (DST): UTC-4 (EDT)
- Zip code: 16634
- Area code: 814
- FIPS code: 42-20152
- GNIS feature ID: 1215269
- Local phone exchanges: 635

Dudley is a borough in Huntingdon County, Pennsylvania, United States. The population was 185 at the 2020 census.

== Geography ==
Dudley is located in southwestern Huntingdon County in the valley of Shoup Run, a west-flowing tributary of the Raystown Branch Juniata River. Pennsylvania Route 913 passes through the borough, leading east (uphill) 2.5 miles (4.0 km) to Broad Top City and west (downstream) 2 miles (3 km) to Coalmont.

According to the United States Census Bureau, the borough of Dudley has a total area of 0.33 square miles (0.85 km^{2}), all land.

== Demographics ==
Historical population
Census	Pop.	Note	%±
1880	203		—
1890	281		38.4%
1900	290		3.2%
1910	440		51.7%
1920	491		11.6%
1930	494		0.6%
1940	410		−17.0%
1950	350		−14.6%
1960	295		−15.7%
1970	232		−21.4%
1980	282		21.6%
1990	232		−17.7%
2000	192		−17.2%
2010	184		−4.2%
2020	184		0.0%
2021 (est.)	183	▼	−0.5%

As of the census of 2000, there were 192 people, 79 households, and 54 families residing in the borough. The population density was 509.8 inhabitants per square mile (196.8/km^{2}). There were 89 housing units at an average density of 236.3 per square mile (91.2/km^{2}). The racial makeup of the borough was 100.00% White.

There were 79 households, out of which 29.1% had children under the age of 18 living with them, 60.8% were married couples living together, 6.3% had a female householder with no husband present, and 30.4% were non-families. 25.3% of all households were made up of individuals, and 15.2% had someone living alone who was 65 years of age or older. The average household size was 2.43 and the average family size was 2.93.

In the borough the population was spread out, with 21.9% under the age of 18, 6.8% from 18 to 24, 28.6% from 25 to 44, 28.6% from 45 to 64, and 14.1% who were 65 years of age or older. The median age was 40 years. For every 100 females there were 102.1 males. For every 100 females age 18 and over, there were 92.3 males.

The median income for a household in the borough was $33,393, and the median income for a family was $40,000. Males had a median income of $28,929 versus $25,313 for females. The per capita income for the borough was $14,984. None of the families and 4.5% of the population were living below the poverty line, including no under eighteens and 14.3% of those over 64.
