= Raystown Branch Juniata River =

Raystown Branch Juniata River Tributary to Juniata River
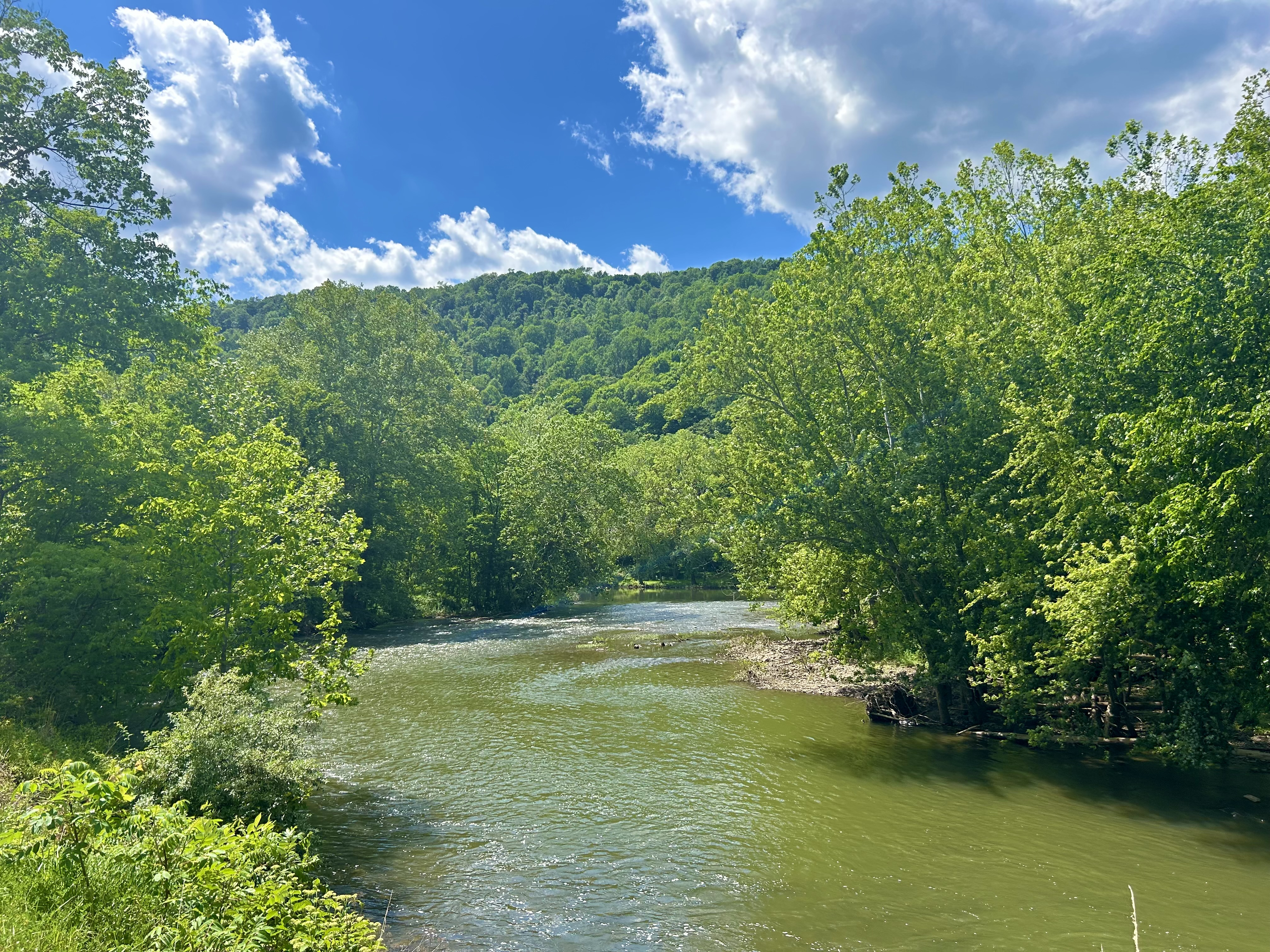
- Raystown Branch of the Juniata River between Saxton and Riddlesburg.

- Location of the mouth of Raystown Branch Juniata River

Location
- Country: United States
- State: Pennsylvania
- Counties: Huntingdon County; Bedford County

Physical characteristics
- Source: divide between Raystown Branch and Wills Creek
  - location: about 1 mile east of Macdonaldton, Pennsylvania
  - coordinates: 39°54′57″N 078°53′00″W
  - elevation: 2,720 ft (830 m)
- Mouth: Juniata River
  - location: Ardenheim, Pennsylvania
  - coordinates: 40°27′17″N 077°58′39″W
  - elevation: 600 ft (180 m)
- Length: 62.14 mi (100.00 km)
- Basin size: 961.96 square miles (2,491.5 km^{2})
- Discharge
  - location: Ardenheim, Pennsylvania
  - average: 1,233.99 cu ft/s (34.943 m^{3}/s) at mouth with Juniata River

Basin features
- Progression: generally north
- River system: Juniata River
- Tributaries
  - left: Breastwork Run; Shawnee Branch; Dunning Creek; Pipers Run; Yellow Creek; Dry Run; Ravers Run; Sugar Camp Run; Shy Beaver Creek; Coffee Run; James Creek; Hawns Run
  - right: Wambaugh Run; Cove Creek; Brush Creek; Tub Mill Run; French Run; Kimber Run; Six Mile Run; Shoup Run; Tatman Run; Great Trough Creek
- Waterbodies: Raystown Lake

The Raystown Branch Juniata River is the largest and longest tributary of the Juniata River in south-central Pennsylvania in the United States.

The Raystown Branch Juniata River begins along the Allegheny Front in Somerset County and flows 123 miles (198 km) to the confluence with the Juniata River near Huntingdon. It passes through the boroughs of Bedford and Everett along its course.

Approximately 5.4 miles (8.7 km) upstream of the mouth, the United States Army Corps of Engineers Raystown Dam forms Raystown Lake, the largest lake entirely within Pennsylvania.

== Course ==
Beginning at an elevation of approximately 2720' in an area of wetlands near the intersection of White Horse Road and Saylor Road near Berlin in Somerset County, the Raystown Branch flows north as a small stream along the forested mountainside of the Allegheny Front.

It passes under the Pennsylvania Turnpike at the eastern portal of the Allegheny Mountain Tunnel. Then the Raystown loosely parallels the highway's path down the mountain, eventually turning East and passing on the north side of the community of New Baltimore.

The river continues to parallel the turnpike to Bedford, where it enters the borough from the north. There are two lowhead dams within its course through the borough.

As it continues East, the river carves a water gap known as the Narrows, through which the turnpike and US 30 both pass. Next, the river flows into the borough of Everett before paralleling US 30 to Juniata Crossing near Breezewood. Notably, this was the site of a rudimentary stockade that was constructed in 1758 by General Forbes as part of his road to resupply troops during the French and Indian War.

After turning north, the river begins a number of serpentine bends before reaching the village of Cypher. At this point, the now-defunct H&BT railroad followed the river's course. Much of this section has recently been turned into a rails-to-trails walking path.

Continuing north, the river passes the communities of Hopewell and Riddlesburg. It then makes a large bend, forming a peninsula which now comprises Warrior's Path State Park.

The Raystown Branch then passes near the community of Stonerstown and the borough of Saxton. Near Saxton, a number of old bridge pillars can be seen where the railroad once crossed.

After passing the site of the decommissioned Saxton Nuclear Generating Station, the river flows into Raystown Lake. Prior to the creation of the lake, the river continued unobstructed for roughly 28 miles of turns and bends through a largely rural, rugged valley.

After Raystown Dam, the river continues about two miles until it meets the Juniata between Ardenheim and Mill Creek.

== Bridges ==
- The Diehls Covered Bridge crosses Raystown Branch Juniata River in Harrison Township, Pennsylvania.
- The Bridge in Snake Spring Township crosses Raystown Branch Juniata River in Snake Spring Township, Pennsylvania.
- The Corbin Bridge crosses Raystown Branch Juniata River in Juniata Township, Pennsylvania.

== Tributaries ==
(Heading downstream)

- Breastwork Run
- Dunning Creek
- Cove Creek
- Bloody Run
- Brush Creek
- Yellow Creek
- Great Trough Creek

== See also ==
- List of rivers of Pennsylvania
- Shawnee State Park (Pennsylvania)
- Warriors Path State Park
- Trough Creek State Park
- Bloody Run Canoe Classic
- The Narrows (Pennsylvania)
