= Coaldale, Bedford County, Pennsylvania =

Borough in Pennsylvania, US

Coaldale, Pennsylvania Six Mile Run
- Borough
- Borough of Coaldale
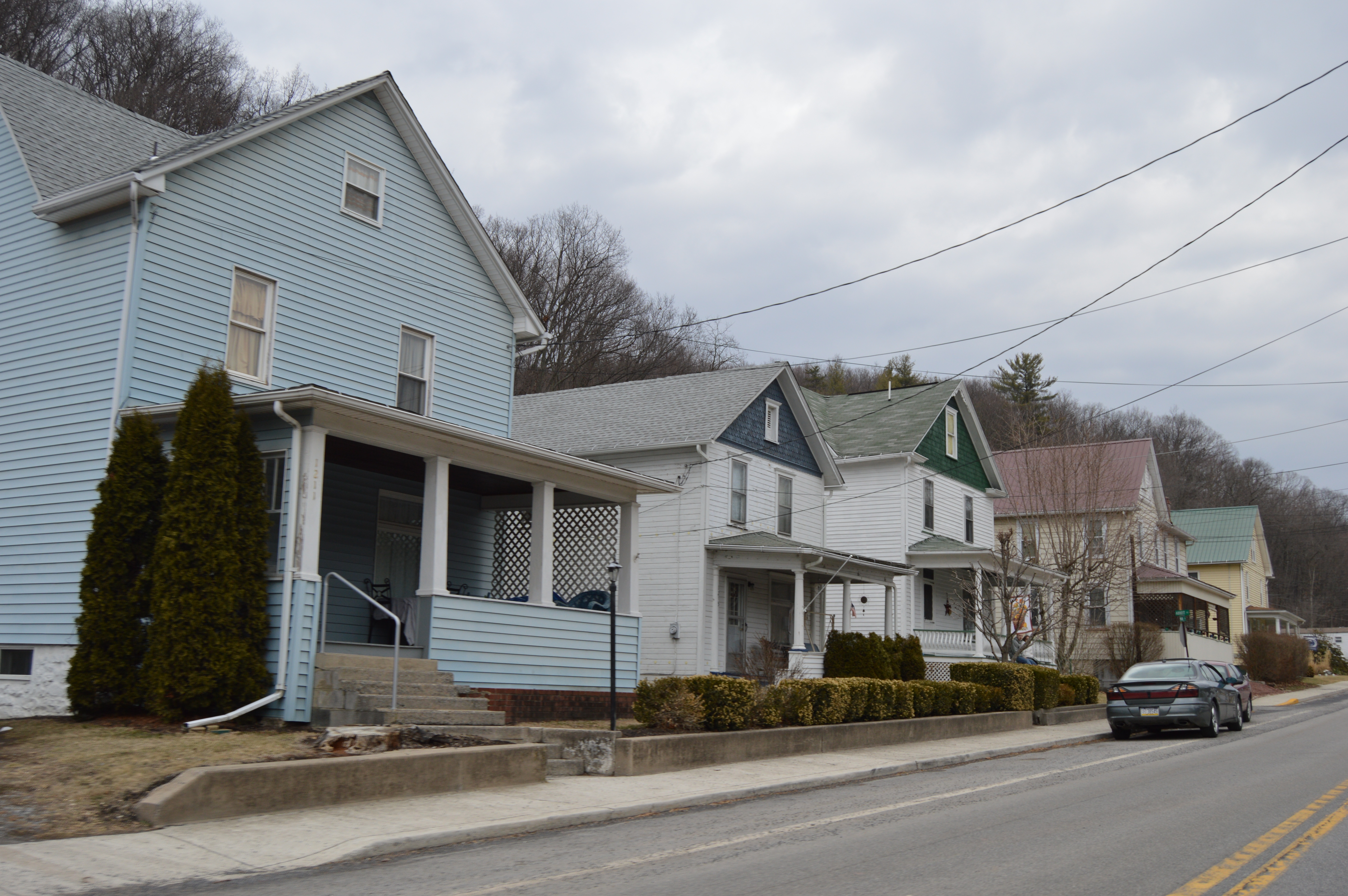
- Houses on Main Street

- Location of Coaldale in Bedford County, Pennsylvania.

- Location within Pennsylvania
- Coordinates: 40°10′04″N 78°12′58″W
- Country: United States
- State: Pennsylvania
- County: Bedford
- Settled: 1855
- Incorporated: 1865

Government
  - Type: Borough Council

Area
  - Total: 0.035 sq mi (0.09 km^{2})
  - Land: 0.035 sq mi (0.09 km^{2})
  - Water: 0 sq mi (0.00 km^{2})
- Elevation: 1,939 ft (591 m)

Population (2020)
  - Total: 126
  - Density: 3,735.0/sq mi (1,442.08/km^{2})
- Time zone: UTC-5 (Eastern (EST))
  - Summer (DST): UTC-4 (EDT)
- ZIP code: 16679
- Area code: 814
- FIPS code: 42-14584
- GNIS feature ID: 1172081

Coaldale is a borough in Bedford County, Pennsylvania, United States. As of the 2020 census the borough population was 126. The post office serving Coaldale is called Six Mile Run.

== Geography ==
Coaldale is located in northeastern Bedford County at 40°10′4″N 78°12′58″W (40.167641, -78.216200). It is surrounded by Broad Top Township and sits in the valley of Six Mile Run, a tributary of the Raystown Branch of the Juniata River. It is 8 miles (13 km) south of the head of Raystown Lake and 26 miles (42 km) northeast of Bedford, the county seat.

According to the United States Census Bureau, the borough has a total area of 0.03 square miles (0.09 km^{2}), all land. It is the smallest municipality in Pennsylvania.

== Demographics ==
Historical population
Census	Pop.	Note	%±
1870	262		—
1880	258		−1.5%
1890	272		5.4%
1900	348		27.9%
1910	311		−10.6%
1920	300		−3.5%
1930	250		−16.7%
1940	273		9.2%
1950	231		−15.4%
1960	187		−19.0%
1970	174		−7.0%
1980	233		33.9%
1990	143		−38.6%
2000	146		2.1%
2010	161		10.3%
2020	126		−21.7%
2021 (est.)	127		0.8%

As of the census of 2000, there were 146 people, 57 households, and 42 families residing in the borough. The population density was 2,960.0 inhabitants per square mile (1,142.9/km^{2}). There were 70 housing units at an average density of 1,419.2 per square mile (548.0/km^{2}). The racial makeup of the borough was 98.63% White, 0.68% African American, and 0.68% from two or more races. Hispanic or Latino of any race were 2.74% of the population.

There were 57 households, out of which 38.6% had children under the age of 18 living with them, 50.9% were married couples living together, 12.3% had a female householder with no husband present, and 24.6% were non-families. 19.3% of all households were made up of individuals, and 8.8% had someone living alone who was 65 years of age or older. The average household size was 2.56 and the average family size was 2.86.

In the borough the population was spread out, with 28.8% under the age of 18, 9.6% from 18 to 24, 28.1% from 25 to 44, 25.3% from 45 to 64, and 8.2% who were 65 years of age or older. The median age was 34 years. For every 100 females there were 108.6 males. For every 100 females age 18 and over, there were 103.9 males.

The median income for a household in the borough was $25,167, and the median income for a family was $25,521. Males had a median income of $26,500 versus $18,750 for females. The per capita income for the borough was $10,072. There were 20.5% of families and 20.6% of the population living below the poverty line, including 8.6% of under eighteens and 18.2% of those over 64.
