= Broad Top City, Pennsylvania =

Borough in Pennsylvania, US

- Borough
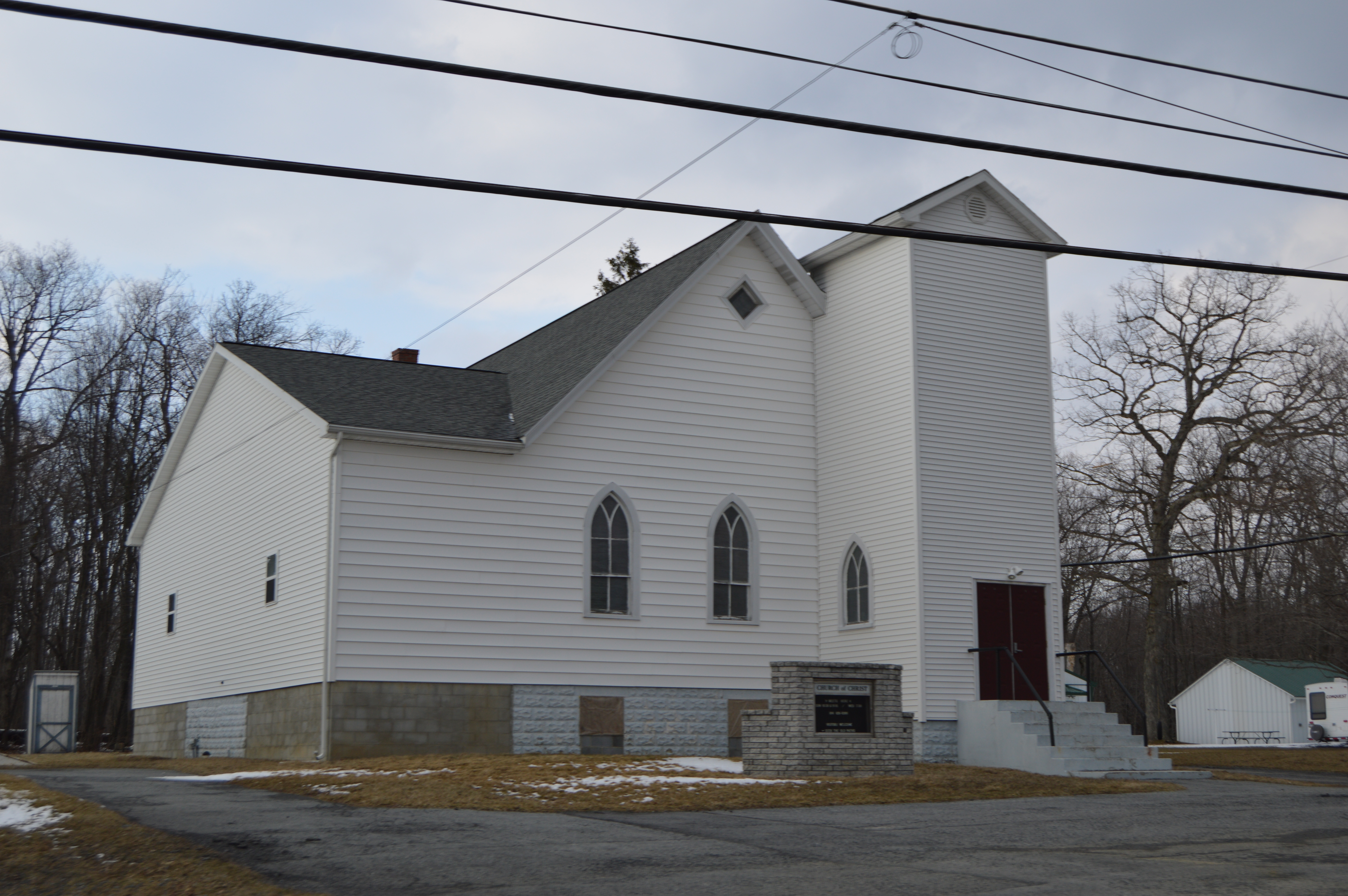
- Church of Christ on Railroad Avenue

- Location of Broad Top City in Huntingdon County, Pennsylvania.

- Location within Pennsylvania Location within the United States
- Coordinates: 40°12′06″N 78°08′23″W
- Country: United States
- State: Pennsylvania
- County: Huntingdon

Government
  - Type: Borough Council
  - Mayor: Nathan Neville (R)

Area
  - Total: 0.68 sq mi (1.75 km^{2})
  - Land: 0.68 sq mi (1.75 km^{2})
  - Water: 0 sq mi (0.00 km^{2})
- Elevation: 1,975 ft (602 m)

Population (2020)
  - Total: 367
  - Density: 542.3/sq mi (209.38/km^{2})
- Time zone: UTC-5 (Eastern (EST))
  - Summer (DST): UTC-4 (EDT)
- ZIP code: 16621
- Area code: 814
- FIPS code: 42-08896
- Local phone exchanges: 635

Broad Top City is a borough in Huntingdon County, Pennsylvania, United States. The population was 371 at the 2020 census, a decline from the figure of 452 tabulated in 2010.

== Geography ==
Broad Top City is located in southwestern Huntingdon County and is bordered to the north, west, and south by Carbon Township and to the east by Wood Township. The borough sits on top of a plateau at an elevation of 1,970 feet (600 m) above sea level.

Pennsylvania Route 913 passes through the center of the borough, leading west 2.5 miles (4.0 km) to Dudley and southeast 2 miles (3 km) to Robertsdale, downhill in both directions.

According to the United States Census Bureau, the borough has a total area of 0.68 square miles (1.75 km^{2}), all land.

== Demographics ==
Historical population
Census	Pop.	Note	%±
1870	327		—
1880	298		−8.9%
1890	240		−19.5%
1900	258		7.5%
1910	478		85.3%
1920	519		8.6%
1930	511		−1.5%
1940	610		19.4%
1950	483		−20.8%
1960	334		−30.8%
1970	283		−15.3%
1980	340		20.1%
1990	331		−2.6%
2000	384		16.0%
2010	452		17.7%
2020	367		−18.8%
2021 (est.)	367	Steady	0.0%

As of the census of 2000, there were 384 people, 162 households, and 117 families residing in the borough. The population density was 600.8 inhabitants per square mile (232.0/km^{2}). There were 178 housing units at an average density of 278.5 per square mile (107.5/km^{2}). The racial makeup of the borough was 100.00% White.

There were 162 households, out of which 30.9% had children under the age of 18 living with them, 58.0% were married couples living together, 8.0% had a female householder with no husband present, and 27.2% were non-families. 24.7% of all households were made up of individuals, and 14.8% had someone living alone who was 65 years of age or older. The average household size was 2.37 and the average family size was 2.80.

In the borough the population was spread out, with 20.6% under the age of 18, 7.8% from 18 to 24, 24.2% from 25 to 44, 30.7% from 45 to 64, and 16.7% who were 65 years of age or older. The median age was 43 years. For every 100 females there were 106.5 males. For every 100 females age 18 and over, there were 100.7 males.

The median income for a household in the borough was $27,500, and the median income for a family was $33,056. Males had a median income of $28,438 versus $21,250 for females. The per capita income for the borough was $12,788. About 21.2% of families and 19.8% of the population were below the poverty line, including 19.8% of those under age 18 and 3.6% of those age 65 or over.
