= Saxton, Pennsylvania =

Borough in Pennsylvania, US

- Borough
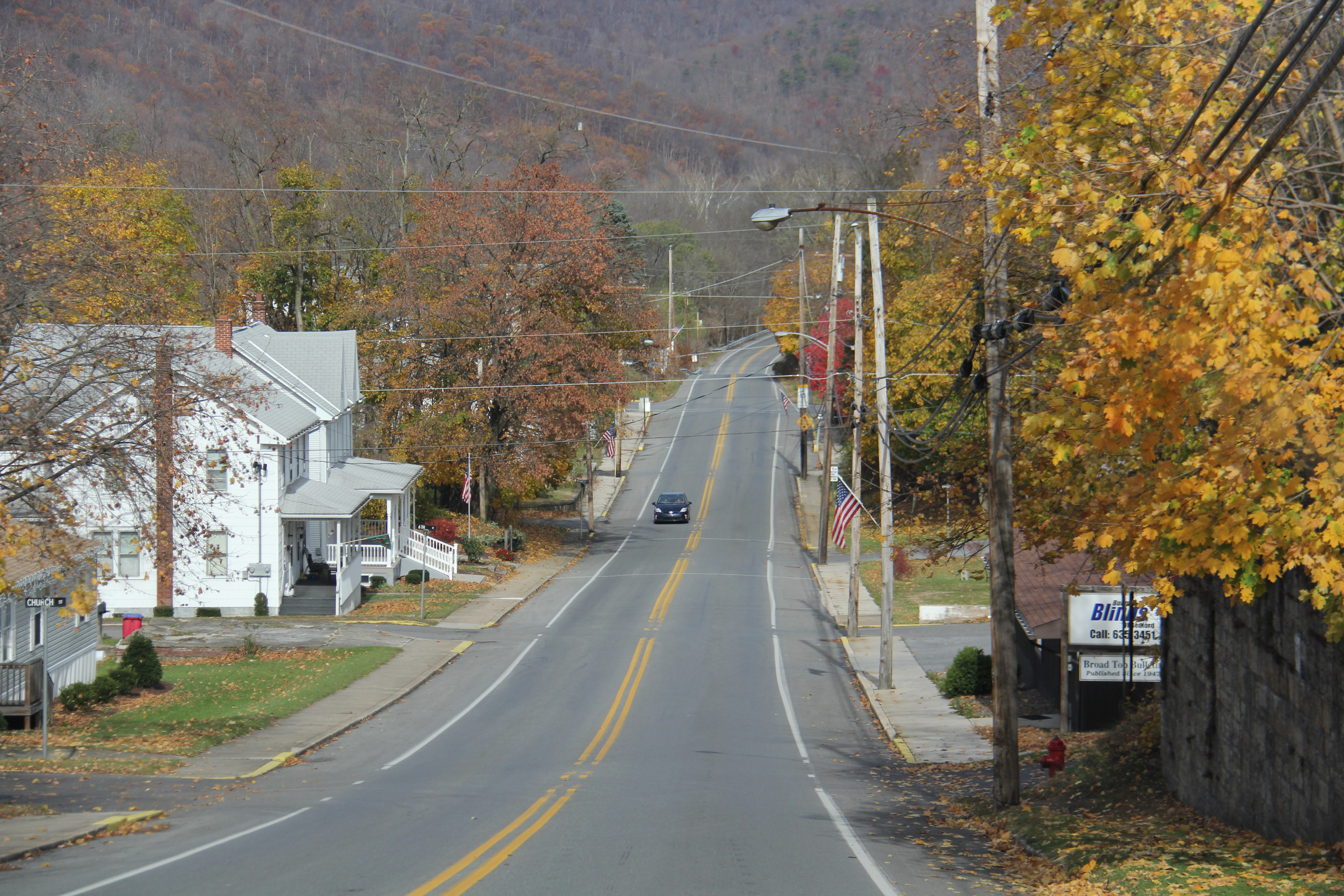
- 6th Street (PA 913) looking north in Saxton

- Location of Saxton in Bedford County, Pennsylvania.

- Location within Pennsylvania
- Coordinates: 40°12′53″N 78°14′43″W
- Country: United States
- State: Pennsylvania
- County: Bedford
- Settled: 1855
- Incorporated: 1867

Government
  - Type: Borough Council
  - Mayor: Larry Foore

Area
  - Total: 0.41 sq mi (1.05 km^{2})
  - Land: 0.41 sq mi (1.05 km^{2})
  - Water: 0 sq mi (0.00 km^{2})
- Elevation: 1,716 ft (523 m)

Population (2020)
  - Total: 726
  - Estimate (2021): 718
  - Density: 1,675.6/sq mi (646.96/km^{2})
- Time zone: UTC-5 (Eastern (EST))
  - Summer (DST): UTC-4 (EDT)
- Zip code: 16678
- Area code: 814
- FIPS code: 42-68072

Saxton is a borough in Bedford County, Pennsylvania, United States. The population was 726 at the 2020 census.

== Geography ==
Saxton is located in northwestern Bedford County at 40°12′53″N 78°14′43″W (40.214584, -78.245241), at the western edge of an area known as the Broad Top in the Appalachian Mountains. Saxton is located in Woodcock Valley, along the east bank of the Raystown Branch of the Juniata River. It flows into Raystown Lake, which begins roughly one mile north of the borough. Saxton Mountain is a small, sharp ridge which rises above the town to the east, behind which is the Broad Top plateau. Approximately two miles to the west of Saxton is Tussey Mountain, which runs south to north.

Saxton is bordered to the west by the unincorporated community of Stonerstown. Pennsylvania Route 913 passes through Saxton, leading west through Stonerstown and across the Raystown Branch to end at Pennsylvania Route 26, and leading east to Broad Top City atop the plateau. Via PA-26, it is 22 miles (35 km) south to Everett and 27 miles (43 km) north to Huntingdon.

According to the United States Census Bureau, Saxton has a total area of 0.41 square miles (1.05 km^{2}), all land.

== History ==
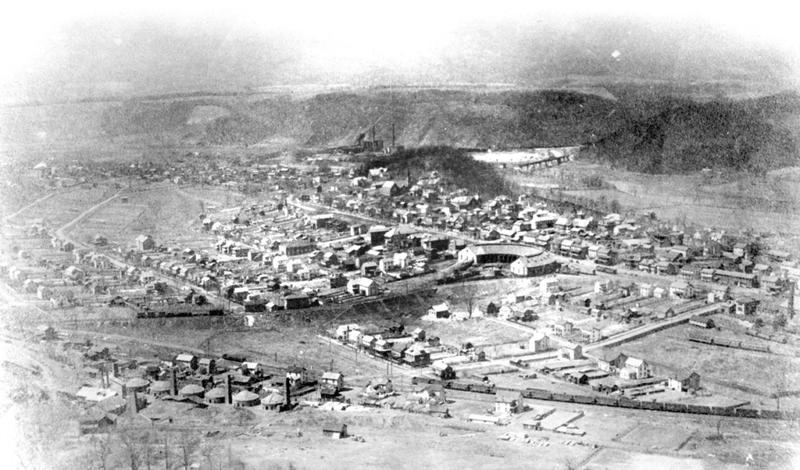
Saxton around 1900

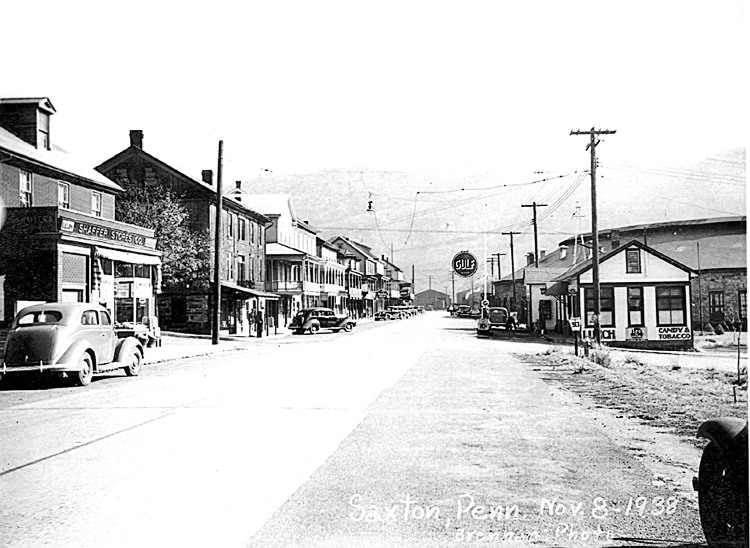
Main Street Saxton in 1938

Officially founded in 1855 by James Saxton, the community was designed to be the central hub of the recently chartered Huntingdon and Broad Top Railroad. Despite its remote location, the region had been inhabited for centuries. Before Anglos arrived, Native Americans camped along the shores of the Raystown Branch of the Juniata. They often traveled through the region following the Warrior's Path, a branch of the Great Indian Path that was among the primary north/south routes in the mountains.

As the nascent United States grew and pushed the frontier west, a few settlers began building homesteads, farms, and mills throughout the valley that Saxton would eventually be located in. This followed the construction of Raystown, a fort and trading post that would grow into Bedford. Among the first settlers in the Broad Top area was Sebastian Shoup, who had constructed a homestead and gristmill by the 1780s. Under constant threat of roving bands of hostile Native American tribes, the early settlers constructed a stockade known as Shoup's fort.

Early surveys into the region discovered vast deposits of bituminous coal, iron ore, and limestone. During the early 1800s a number of limekilns and iron furnaces were constructed throughout the area. By the 1850's with the industrialization of the region well underway, desire grew to access the still remote Broad Top region to begin mining coal. In 1852 the Huntingdon and Broad Top Railroad (H&BT) was chartered. Seizing on the opportunity, James Saxton and Joseph Fockler purchased land with the intent of building a community. Thus, Saxton was created, and was intentionally designed to serve as the railroad's central hub. For almost 100 years, the H&BT would ship coal and iron from Saxton to places like Bedford, Huntingdon and Everett. From there it would go on to industrial centers, such as Pittsburgh or Baltimore.

The thriving railroad attracted thousands of workers and their families to the town and surrounding area. In its heyday Saxton had a bowling alley, a toy factory, a candy factory, a coal power plant, dozens of shops and businesses, and even a 7 Up bottling plant. Saxton and the surrounding area were full of industry and other businesses. These included a pig iron furnace, coke ovens, a tannery, brickyards, dairies, and others. However, the prosperity would not last, as the mines began to become exhausted of coal after World War II. This in conjunction with the recession of 1949 caused the railroad to shut down in 1955. Most of the buildings and infrastructure owned by the railroad were abandoned, and has subsequently been salvaged or left to erode away.

Saxton was chosen to be the home of the Saxton Nuclear Generating Station, the nation's fourth nuclear power plant, which was commissioned in 1961. It was one of the first test facilities for peace-time plutonium use, as well as cooling methods that would be used to relieve meltdown situations such as the Fukushima Daiichi nuclear disaster in 2011. The facility was decommissioned in 1972, and the radioactive core removed in 2005.

== Demographics ==
Historical population
Census	Pop.	Note	%±
1870	318		—
1880	369		16.0%
1890	712		93.0%
1900	937		31.6%
1910	1,195		27.5%
1920	1,165		−2.5%
1930	1,128		−3.2%
1940	1,152		2.1%
1950	1,093		−5.1%
1960	977		−10.6%
1970	858		−12.2%
1980	814		−5.1%
1990	838		2.9%
2000	803		−4.2%
2010	736		−8.3%
2020	726		−1.4%
2021 (est.)	718	▼	−1.1%

As of the census of 2000, there were 803 people, 357 households, and 213 families residing in the borough. The population density was 1,949.9 inhabitants per square mile (752.9/km^{2}). There were 397 housing units at an average density of 964.0 per square mile (372.2/km^{2}). The racial makeup of the borough was 99.25% White, 0.12% African American, and 0.62% from two or more races. Hispanic or Latino of any race were 0.87% of the population.

There were 357 households, out of which 27.5% had children under the age of 18 living with them, 39.8% were married couples living together, 14.3% had a female householder with no husband present, and 40.1% were non-families. 37.0% of all households were made up of individuals, and 22.4% had someone living alone who was 65 years of age or older. The average household size was 2.24 and the average family size was 2.84.

In the borough the population was spread out, with 24.2% under the age of 18, 10.3% from 18 to 24, 23.9% from 25 to 44, 21.3% from 45 to 64, and 20.3% who were 65 years of age or older. The median age was 38 years. For every 100 females there were 79.6 males. For every 100 females age 18 and over, there were 72.5 males.

The median income for a household in the borough was $26,853, and the median income for a family was $34,250. Males had a median income of $29,375 versus $22,917 for females. The per capita income for the borough was $22,326. About 13.2% of families and 15.6% of the population were below the poverty line, including 19.5% of those under age 18 and 8.9% of those age 65 or over.

According to the 2010-2014 American Community Survey, Saxton household income demographics reflect 57.1% of all households earn less than $50,000 annually.

== Notable people ==
- Billy Clapper, former head coach, men's basketball, Penn State Altoona
- Sandra Fluke, feminist, pro-choice activist
- Justin Jordan, writer, comic book creator
