= Hopewell Township, Huntingdon County, Pennsylvania =

Township in Pennsylvania, US

Coordinates: 40°14′45″N 78°13′59″W

- Township
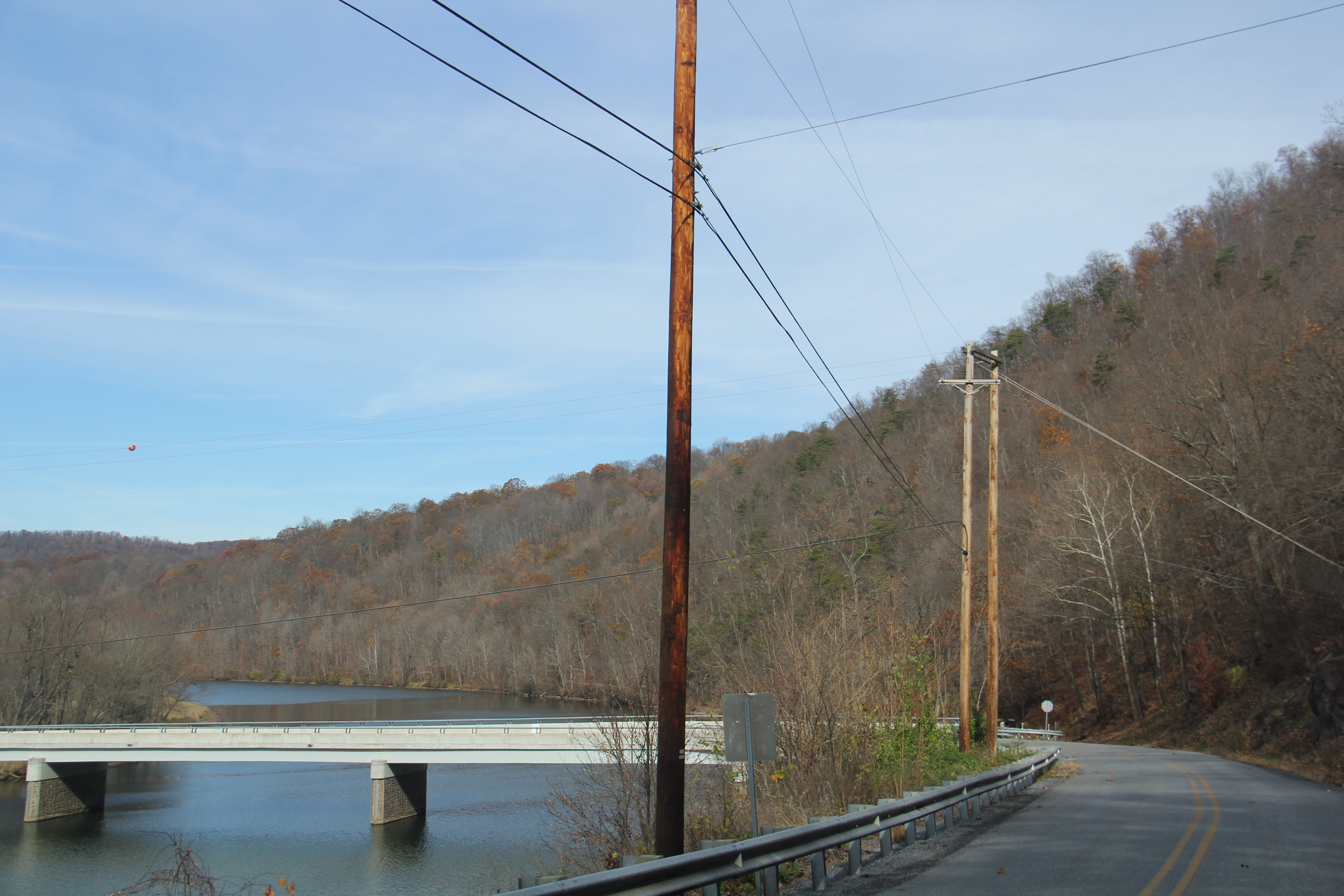
- Southern part of Raystown Lake in Hopewell Township

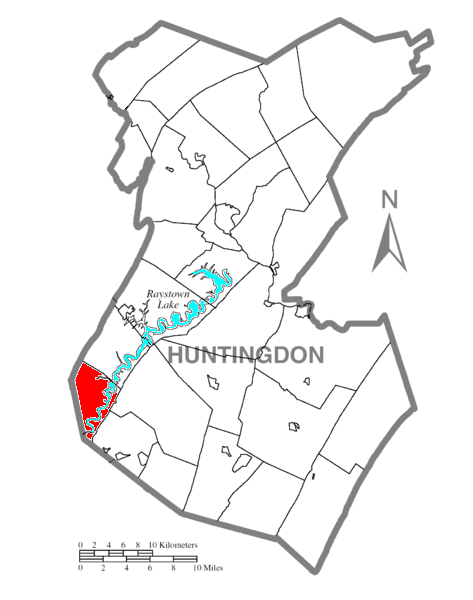
- Map of Huntingdon County, Pennsylvania Highlighting Hopewell Township

- Map of Huntingdon County, Pennsylvania
- Country: United States
- State: Pennsylvania
- County: Huntingdon

Area
  - Total: 16.74 sq mi (43.36 km^{2})
  - Land: 15.31 sq mi (39.64 km^{2})
  - Water: 1.43 sq mi (3.71 km^{2})

Population (2020)
  - Total: 455 ▼
  - Estimate (2022): 448
  - Density: 38.5/sq mi (14.88/km^{2})
- Time zone: UTC-5 (Eastern (EST))
  - Summer (DST): UTC-4 (EDT)
- Zip code: 16678
- Area code: 814
- FIPS code: 42-061-35688
- Website: https://hopewelltownshippa.org/
- Local phone exchanges: 635, 658

Hopewell Township is a township in Huntingdon County, Pennsylvania, United States. The population was 455 at the 2020 census.

== Geography ==
According to the United States Census Bureau, the township has a total area of 16.6 square miles (43 km^{2}), of which 15.1 square miles (39 km^{2}) is land and 1.4 square miles (3.6 km^{2}) (8.69%) is water.

== Recreation ==
A portion of Pennsylvania State Game Lands Number 73 is located at the western border of the township.

== Demographics ==
Historical population
Census	Pop.	Note	%±
2000	587		—
2010	586		−0.2%
2020	455		−22.4%
2022 (est.)	448		−1.5%
U.S. Decennial Census

As of the census of 2000, there were 587 people, 240 households, and 180 families residing in the township. The population density was 38.8 inhabitants per square mile (15.0/km^{2}). There were 384 housing units at an average density of 25.4/sq mi (9.8/km^{2}). The racial makeup of the township was 98.81% White, 0.51% Native American, and 0.68% from two or more races. Hispanic or Latino of any race were 0.85% of the population.

There were 240 households, out of which 27.9% had children under the age of 18 living with them, 60.0% were married couples living together, 9.6% had a female householder with no husband present, and 25.0% were non-families. 19.2% of all households were made up of individuals, and 10.8% had someone living alone who was 65 years of age or older. The average household size was 2.45 and the average family size was 2.77.

In the township the population was spread out, with 21.3% under the age of 18, 6.0% from 18 to 24, 27.1% from 25 to 44, 30.2% from 45 to 64, and 15.5% who were 65 years of age or older. The median age was 42 years. For every 100 females, there were 106.0 males. For every 100 females age 18 and over, there were 105.3 males.

The median income for a household in the township was $30,658, and the median income for a family was $35,313. Males had a median income of $30,893 versus $20,250 for females. The per capita income for the township was $20,124. About 9.2% of families and 10.9% of the population were below the poverty line, including 18.0% of those under age 18 and 9.2% of those age 65 or over.
