= Crystal Spring, Pennsylvania =

Unincorporated community in Pennsylvania, U.S.

Coordinates: 39°56′59″N 78°13′43″W

Crystal Spring is an unincorporated community in Brush Creek Township, Fulton County, Pennsylvania, United States, south of Breezewood. Just to the west, across the county line in Bedford County, is Gapsville.

The community lies east of a water gap, where Brush Creek passes through Rays Hill, which forms the western border of Fulton County.

The elevation is approximately 1161 feet.
