= Pennsylvania Route 915 =

State highway in Pennsylvania, US

Pennsylvania Route 915

Route information
- Maintained by PennDOT
- Length: 22.163 mi (35.668 km)

Major junctions
- South end: I-70 in Brush Creek Township
- US 30 in Brush Creek Township
- North end: PA 26 in Hopewell

Location
- Country: United States
- State: Pennsylvania
- Counties: Fulton, Bedford

Highway system
- Pennsylvania State Route System; Interstate; US; State; Scenic; Legislative
| ← PA 914 | → PA 916 |

Pennsylvania Route 915 (PA 915) is a 22-mile-long (35 km) state highway located in Fulton and Bedford counties in Pennsylvania. The southern terminus is at Interstate 70 (I-70) in Brush Creek Township. The northern terminus is at PA 26 in Hopewell.

== Route description ==
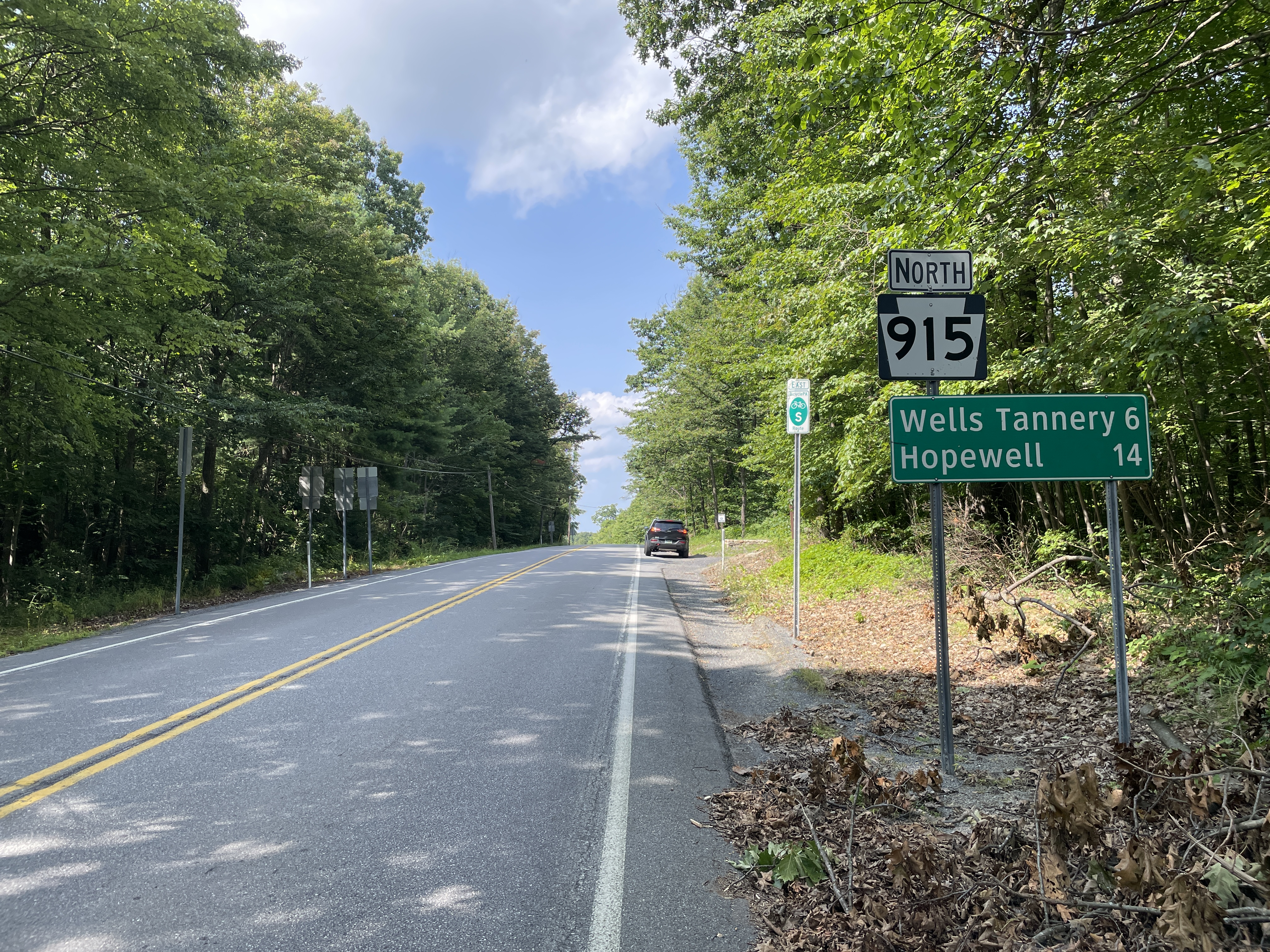
PA 915 northbound past US 30 in Brush Creek Township

PA 915 begins at an interchange with I-70 in Brush Creek Township, Fulton County, heading northeast on two-lane undivided Crystal Springs Road, after sharing a brief concurrency with Old 126. The road winds through a mix of farmland and woodland with some homes. At Akersville, the route turns north and winds through more rural areas. PA 915 heads northeast through agricultural areas before turning north and heading into wooded areas with some homes, reaching an intersection with US 30. At this point, the route turns east to form a concurrency with US 30 on Lincoln Highway, heading into Buchanan State Forest. PA 915 splits from US 30 by turning north onto North Valley Road, passing through more of the state forest, passing to the west of Sideling Hill. The road curves to the northeast and passes over I-76 (Pennsylvania Turnpike), crossing into Wells Township. The route winds north through more forests before heading into agricultural areas and turning to the northwest. PA 915 passes through more farmland with some homes, running near Wells Tannery before heading through a mix of farms and woods and passing through a gap in Rays Hill.

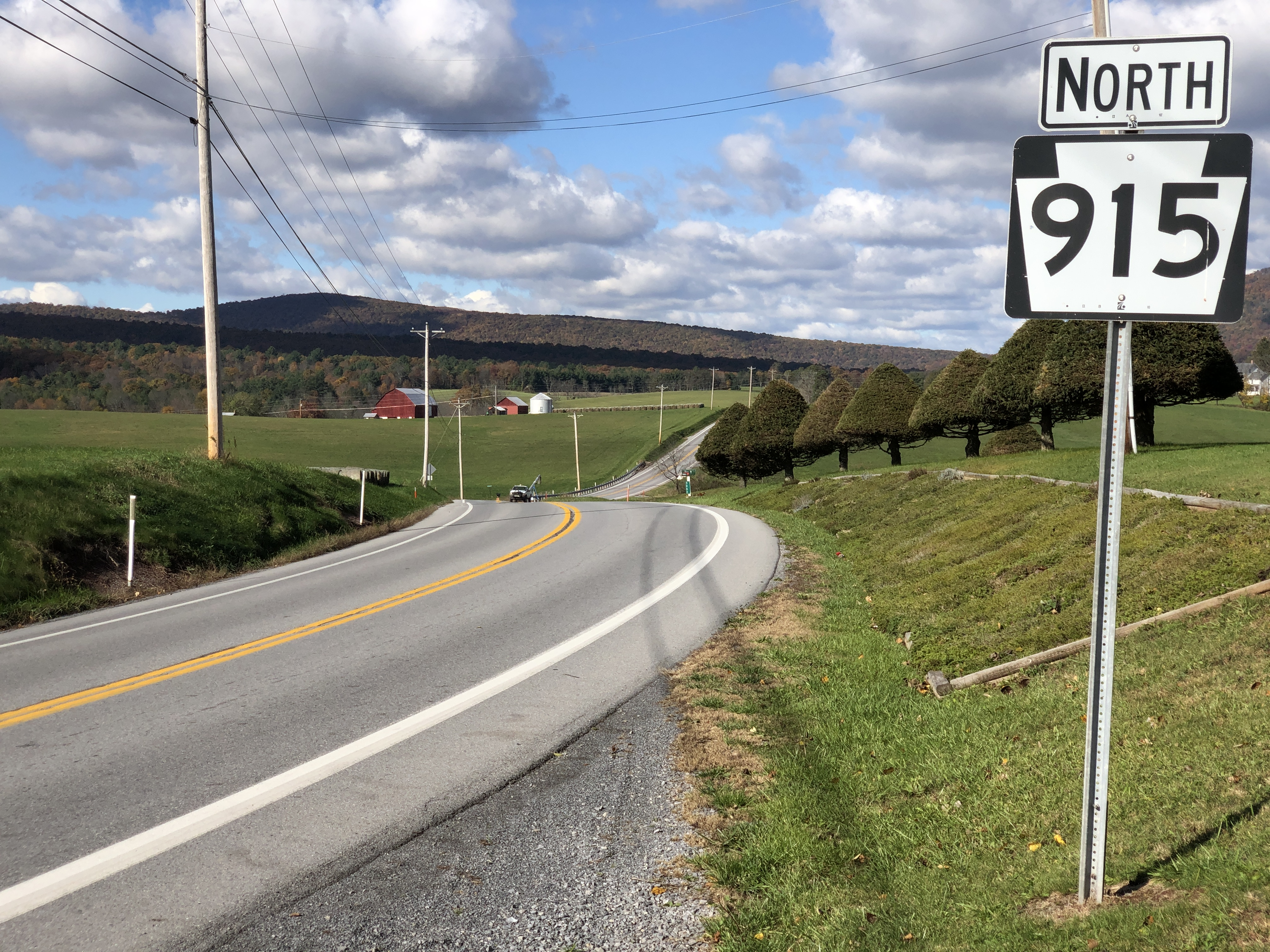
PA 915 northbound in Wells Township

PA 915 enters Broad Top Township in Bedford County and becomes Sandy Run Road, heading through wooded areas with some homes prior to turning west through a few agricultural clearings with some homes. The road heads across forested Kimber Mountain, curving to the north. The route winds northwest through more forests, passing through Sandy Run and Jerkwater. PA 915 heads west through the community of Langdondale before curving northwest through more woods. The road heads into the borough of Hopewell and becomes Water Street, running between the Raystown Branch Juniata River to the west and homes to the east. The route curves northeast onto Front Street and passes through more residential areas. PA 915 crosses the Raystown Branch Juniata River back into Broad Top Township and ends at an intersection with PA 26.

== Major intersections ==
| County | Location | mi | km | Destinations | Notes |
|---|---|---|---|---|---|
| Fulton | Brush Creek Township | 0.000 | 0.000 | I-70 – Breezewood, Hancock | Southern terminus; exit 151 on I-70 |
| Fulton | Brush Creek Township | 6.484 | 10.435 | US 30 west (Lincoln Highway) – Breezewood | South end of US 30 overlap |
| Fulton | Brush Creek Township | 7.868 | 12.662 | US 30 east (Lincoln Highway) – McConnellsburg | North end of US 30 overlap |
| Bedford | Broad Top Township | 22.163 | 35.668 | PA 26 (Raystown Road) – Everett, Huntingdon | Northern terminus |
1.000 mi = 1.609 km; 1.000 km = 0.621 mi: Concurrency terminus
