= Southern Fulton School District =

Public school district in Fulton County, Pennsylvania, US

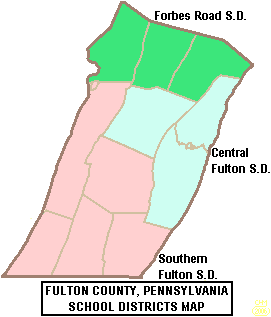

Location
- Fulton County, Pennsylvania; United States

District information
- Type: Public

Students and staff
- District mascot: Indians
- Colors: Maroon and White

Other information
- Website: sfsd.k12.pa.us

The Southern Fulton School District is a public school district serving parts of Fulton County, Pennsylvania. It encompasses the rural townships of Belfast, Bethel, Brush Creek, Thompson, and Union, as well as Valley-Hi Boro. The district encompasses approximately 211 square miles. According to 2000 federal census data, it serves a resident population of 5,143.The district provides a taxpayer-funded preschool program that is open to children who will be 3 or 4 years old before September 1. The program began in 2008.

== Schools ==
- Southern Fulton Elementary School - Grades Pre K–6
  - 3072 Great Cove Rd.
    Warfordsburg, Pennsylvania 17267
- Southern Fulton Jr../Sr. High School - Grades 7-12
  - 13083 Buck Valley Road
    Warfordsburg, Pennsylvania 17267

== Extracurriculars ==
The district's students have access to a variety of clubs, activities and sports.

=== Athletics ===
- Baseball - Class A
- Basketball - Class A
- Cross Country - Class AA
- Boys Soccer - Class A
- Softball - Class A
- Track and Field - Class AA
- Volleyball - Class A
