= Gapsville, Pennsylvania =

Unincorporated community in Pennsylvania, US

- Unincorporated community
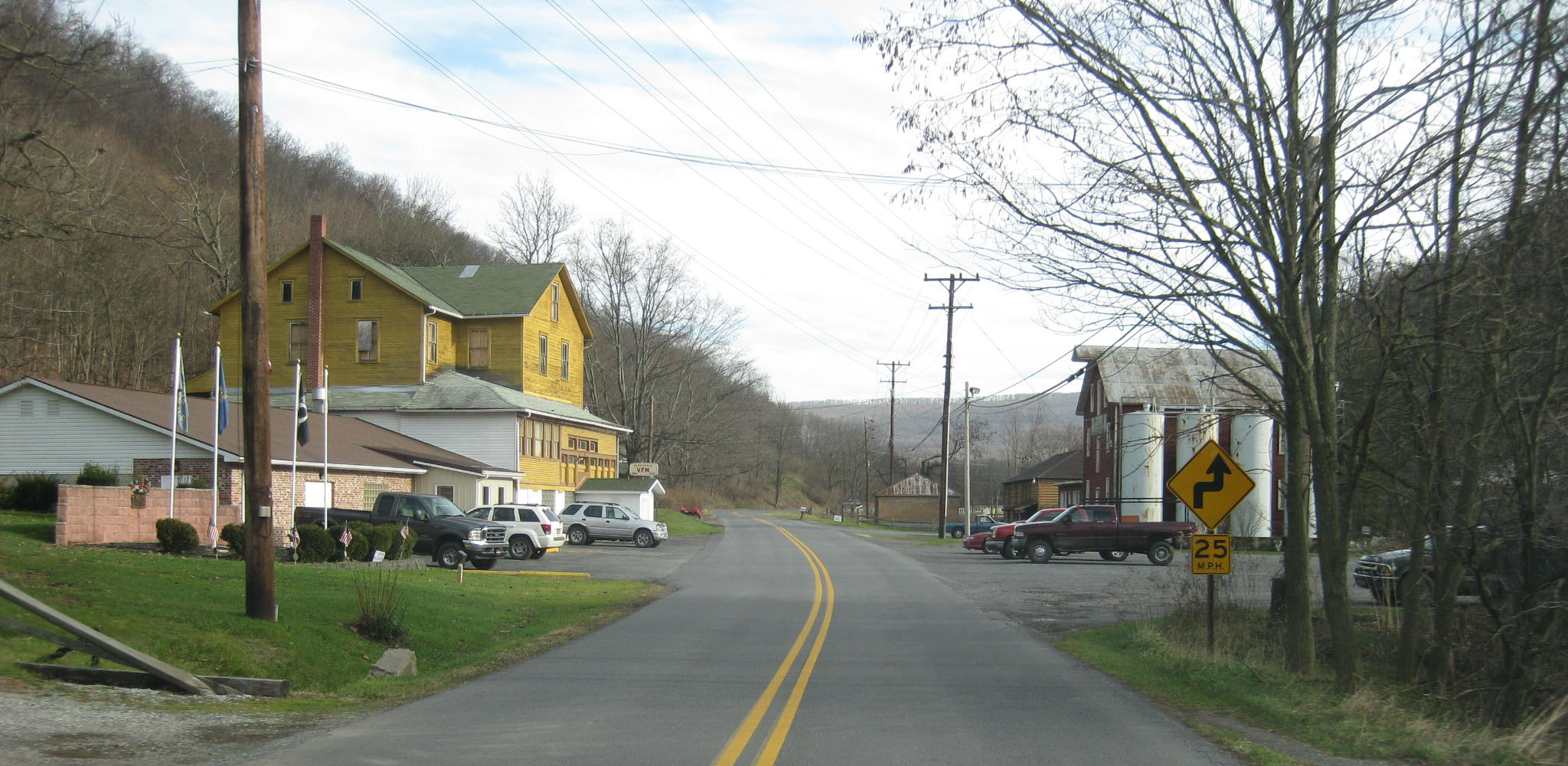
- Gapsville, facing southeast on South Breezewood Road in November 2011. Breezewood Post of VFW on left.

- Location within the state of Pennsylvania Gapsville (the United States)
- Coordinates: 39°57′12″N 78°14′30″W
- Country: United States
- State: Pennsylvania
- County: Bedford
- Township: East Providence
- Elevation: 1,148 ft (350 m)
- Time zone: UTC-5 (Eastern (EST))
  - Summer (DST): UTC-4 (EDT)
- ZIP codes: 15533
- Area code: 814
- GNIS feature ID: 1175425

Gapsville is an unincorporated community in East Providence Township, Bedford County, Pennsylvania, United States, south of Breezewood.

== Geography ==
Gapsville is located on South Breezewood Road (State Route 2024). Just to the east, across the county line in Fulton County, is Crystal Spring.

The community lies west of a water gap, where Brush Creek passes through Rays Hill, which forms the eastern border of Bedford County.

== Notable features ==
The Breezewood Post of the VFW is located in the town, as is the Brush Creek Campground.
