= Forbes Road School District =

School district in Pennsylvania

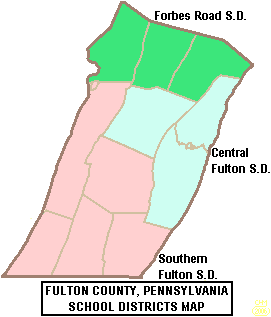

Address
- 159 Red Bird Drive Waterfall, Pennsylvania, 16689; United States

District information
- Type: Public
- Grades: PreK–12
- NCES District ID: 4209870

Students and staff
- Students: 354 (2020–2021)
- Teachers: 31.3 (on an FTE basis)
- Staff: 36.7 (on an FTE basis)
- Student–teacher ratio: 11.31:1
- District mascot: Cardinals
- Colors: Blue and Gold

Other information
- Website: www.frsd.info

The Forbes Road School District is a rural public school district located in Fulton County, Pennsylvania, U.S. It serves the townships of Dublin, Taylor and Wells. The district encompasses approximately 105 square miles. According to 2000 federal census data, it serves a resident population of 3,043.

== Schools ==
The district has two schools, Forbes Road Elementary School and Forbes Road Junior Senior High School, connected in the same building. The school campus is located at 159 Red Bird Drive, between the villages of Hustontown and Waterfall in Taylor Township.

== Extracurriculars ==
The district's students have access to a variety of clubs, activities and sports.

=== Athletics ===
- Baseball – Class A
- Basketball – Class A
- Girls Field Hockey – Class AA
- Boys Soccer – Class A
- Softball – Class A
- Tennis – Class AA
