= SFSD (disambiguation) =

SFSD mostly refers to Sioux Falls, South Dakota, the largest city in South Dakota.

SFSD may also refer to:

- Sioux Falls School District, American school district located in South Dakota
- Silver Falls School District, American school district located in Oregon
- Southern Fulton School District, American school district located in Pennsylvania.
- Saint Francis School Deoghar, Indian Catholic school
- San Francisco Sheriff's Office, American police department formerly known as San Francisco Sheriff's Department
