= Woodvale Historic District =

Historic district in Pennsylvania, United States

- U.S. National Register of Historic Places
- U.S. Historic district
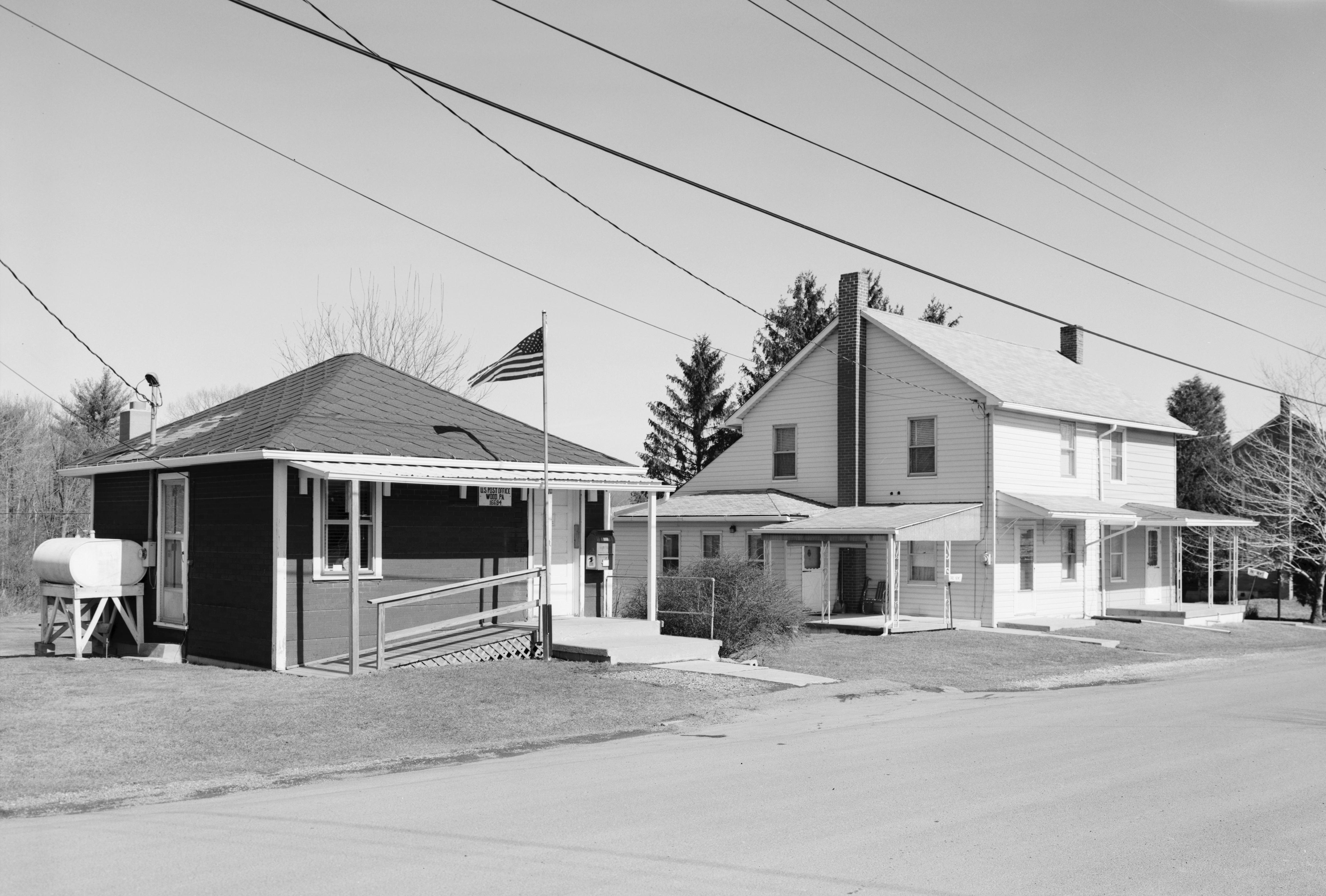
- Post office in Woodvale, Autumn 1989

- Location within Pennsylvania Location within the United States
- Location: Roughly bounded by Ash, High, North, Fulton and Broad Sts., in Woodvale, Broad Top Township, Wells Township, and Wood Township, Pennsylvania
- Coordinates: 40°10′01″N 78°08′17″W
- Area: 96 acres (39 ha)
- Built: 1890, 1942
- Architectural style: Vernacular workers' housing
- MPS: Industrial Resources of Huntingdon County, 1780--1939 MPS
- NRHP reference No.: 92000942
- Added to NRHP: July 24, 1992

The Woodvale Historic District is a national historic district that encompasses multiple historic properties that are located in Broad Top Township, Bedford County, Wells Township, Fulton County, and Wood Township, Huntingdon County, Pennsylvania.

It was added to the National Register of Historic Places in 1992.

== History and architectural features ==
This district includes seventy-nine contributing buildings, one contributing site, and two contributing structures that are located in the coal mining community of Woodvale. These buildings date to roughly between 1890 and 1942, and include industrial buildings, institutional buildings, and vernacular workers' housing. They were built by the Rockhill Iron and Coal Company.

Non-residential buildings include the Methodist Church (1911), St. Michael's Greek Orthodox Church (1930s), a social hall, a mule barn, a power house, a railroad machine shop (1918), and a post office (1919).
