= List of killings by law enforcement officers in the United States, March 2012 =

This is a list of people reported killed by non-military law enforcement officers in the United States in March 2012, whether in the line of duty or not, and regardless of reason or method. The listing documents the occurrence of a death, making no implications regarding wrongdoing or justification on the part of the person killed or officer involved. Killings are arranged by date of the incident that caused death. Different death dates, if known, are noted in the description. The table below lists 44 people.

== March 2012 ==
| Date | Name (Age) of Deceased | City, State | Description |
|---|---|---|---|
| 2012-03-31 | George Wells, III (29) | Baltimore, Maryland | Officers responded to a report of a domestic disturbance. The suspect left the home and was chased a couple blocks. Wells had a knife and after a physical altercation with an officer, he was fatally shot. Family members say he was shot in the back from 20' away and a wrongful death lawsuit is scheduled for trial in September 2015. |
| 2012-03-29 | Ryan Sever (28) | Chardon, Ohio | Officers responded to a report of a domestic disturbance. The suspect had left the home and was found nearby. When approached by officers, Sever pulled out a knife and "engaged" an officer, who fatally shot him. |
| 2012-03-29 | Johnny L. Bentley (74) | Newport, Michigan | |
| 2012-03-28 | Kevin Bolden (19) | Washington DC | Officers responded to report of drug activity and approached a group of people. One man ran and police pursued. The man drew a gun. Shots were exchanged and the man died at the scene. |
| 2012-03-27 | Sheron Carter Jackson (29) | Baltimore, Maryland | Officers responded to a report of a domestic disturbance. The suspect allegedly threatened an officer with a knife and was fatally shot. |
| 2012‑03‑27 | Tendai Nhekairo (18) | Atlanta, Georgia | Officers were called to Nhekairo's apartment to investigate suspicious behavior. Nhekairo came out of his apartment naked and wielding two knives. Nhekairo allegedly attempted to attack one of the officers with the knives, that officers then shot and killed him. |
| 2012-03-25 | Eric Bradley (40s) | Chicago, Illinois | Officers responded to report of theft in progress. While attempting to arrest the suspect, the man produced a handgun. A struggle ensued and the officers shot the man who was pronounced dead at the scene. |
| 2012-03-24 | Kendrec McDade (19) | Pasadena, California | The 19-year-old college student was killed by officers who opened fire on him in an alley, believing him to be the culprit of a robbery at gunpoint that had been called in that evening. McDade was shot multiple times in the chest and died in a hospital. Officers claimed McDade had motioned at his waistband, but the teenager was unarmed. The 26-year-old 911 caller, who later admitted to lying about the gun, was held by police for six days for suspicion of involuntary manslaughter and now faces deportation. In December 2012, the shooters, Jeffrey Newlen and Matthew Griffin, were cleared of charges, although they are still facing a lawsuit in connection with the shooting. |
| 2012-03-23 | William Ekasala (35) | Malden, Massachusetts | Officers were pursuing Ekasala as a prime suspect in an armed bank robbery. Ekasala fired three times at two officers, ordered people out of three vehicles and was driving the third toward an officer when he was fatally shot. |
| 2012-03-22 | David John Lopez (26) | Antioch, California | Lopez was shot to death by officers when he crashed into a police cruiser after a car chase. Detectives had attempted to pull him over for a parole violation. |
| 2012-03-21 | Rekia (or Rebia) Boyd | Chicago, Illinois | An off-duty detective rolled down his car window and asked a group of people gathered near Douglas Park to quiet down. In response, police say, a 39-year-old man pointed a gun at the officer, who drew his own weapon and fired. The bullets hit the alleged gunman in the hand and Rekia Boyd, who was unarmed, in the head as she stood nearby. Witnesses said that no one pulled a gun on the off-duty officer, and that the alleged gunman was actually holding a cell phone instead. Rekia Boyd died in the hospital the following day. A judge acquitted Detective Dante Servin for the fatal shooting because prosecutors didn't file more severe criminal charges against him. |
| 2012-03-21 | Mariano Vargas (52) | Bayonne, New Jersey | |
| 2012-03-20 | Kenneth Blomberg (33) | Hemet, California | Blomberg had attacked his girlfriend, and threatened to burn down her house. Police discovered Blomberg hiding behind some bushes, at a house near his parents, armed with a rifle. Officers ordered him to drop the weapon and come out. Blomberg then allegedly leveled the rifle (possibly a BB Gun) towards the officer. The Officer fired one shot, fatally striking Blomberg. |
| 2012-03-20 | Phillip Steven Doll | Tulsa, Oklahoma | Doll was a "person of interest" in the murder of his girlfriend. He was shot and killed by a police officer responding to a home invasion. The officer found Doll crouched over an elderly victim, Doll then lunged at the officer. |
| 2012-03-18 | Sean Aleister Morrison (15) | Magna, Utah | |
| 2012-03-17 | Daniel Guy Newcomb (33) | Virginia Beach, Virginia | Officers were chasing Newcomb as a robbery suspect. He pointed a gun at the officers who shot and killed him. It was later determined that the gun was a toy submachine gun. |
| 2012-03-16 | Corey Nesbitt (17) | Miramar, Florida | |
| 2012-03-16 | Jacob Newmaker | Fortuna, California | Newmaker was shot to death after allegedly grabbing an officer's baton and striking him with it. Police had responded to a report of a man screaming in his front yard, and reportedly attempted to subdue him with "verbal commands, pepper spray, baton strikes, control holds and a Taser." |
| 2012-03-15 | Kevin Charles Duey (44) | Arnold, California | Officers were responding to a "shots fired" call. When they arrived on the scene Duey was shooting, and refused orders to drop the weapon. Duey then pointed the weapon at officers and started to move towards some nearby houses. The Officer shot once, fatally striking Duey. |
| 2012-03-15 | Noel Rodriguez Torres (22) | Sanger, California | Undercover Fresno Police narcotics officers were working with an informant in the purchase of about two pounds of methamphetime in a Sanger parking lot. As the officers attempted to arrest the three men involved, Torres pulled a gun and ran. Two or three officers shot him as he ran. He died at a Fresno hospital. |
| 2012-03-15 | Shereese Francis (29) | Queens, New York | |
| 2012-03-15 | Javier Torres (50) | San Antonio, Texas | Officers arrived at Torres' home after he called a crisis hotline regarding his contemplating suicide. Torres was not there, but police found him walking down a road carrying a handgun. As the officers approached Torres, he fired at them. They returned fire. Torres died at a local hospital. |
| 2012-03-14 | Dane Scott Jr. | Del City, Oklahoma | Scott was shot in the back after running from police. The shooter, Capt. Randy Trent Harrison, was charged with manslaughter. On November 26, 2013, Harrison was convicted of the charge. |
| 2012-03-11 | Ray Kent Puckett (41) | Garvin, Oklahoma | One officer pursued a driver with a shotgun inside his truck. The driver stopped and exited the vehicle with the weapon in hand. The officer fatally shot the suspect. |
| 2012-03-10 | Michael D. Thomas (26) | New Madrid, Missouri | |
| 2012-03-10 | Kenneth C. Smith (20) | Cleveland, Ohio | |
| 2012-03-10 | Jeffrey Anderson (27) | Elkton, Kentucky | |
| 2012-03-10 | Marquez Smart (23) | Wichita, Kansas | Officers began chasing Smart when he happened to run toward them after allegedly firing at least two shots from a semi-automatic handgun. Officers fired at him multiple times when he refused to drop the weapon and eventually shot him to death in an alley. Four other people, three of them teenagers, were wounded by gunfire either from Smart or the officers. |
| 2012-03-09 | Brandon Giordano (15) | Oxford, Connecticut | |
| 2012-03-08 | Andres Garcia (44) | Woodbridge, New Jersey | |
| 2012-03-08 | John F. Shick (30) | Pittsburgh, Pennsylvania | |
| 2012-03-08 | Diego Munoz-Colon (46) | Dover, New Jersey | |
| 2012-03-07 | Arturo Cabrales (22) | Los Angeles, California | |
| 2012-03-07 | Michael Santana (27) | Miami Lakes, Florida | |
| 2012-03-07 | Wendell Allen (20) | New Orleans, Louisiana | |
| 2012-03-07 | Luis Anthony Escalante (29) | Dallas, Texas | Escalante and another suspect stole a vehicle by showing a man a gun and asking for the keys to his car. Officers traced the vehicle using an electronic tracking device installed in the vehicle. Officers approached the vehicle in a parking lot and ordered the occupants to show their hands. Escalante put the vehicle in reverse and drove towards two officers. Three officers fired at least 15 rounds. Both occupants were injured. Escalante died in a local hospital. Escalante's gun was later determined to be a pellet gun. |
| 2012-03-06 | Timothy Johnson (45) | Brandon, Mississippi | |
| 2012-03-06 | Martin Angel Hernandez | Anaheim, California | Shot to death after turning towards an officer with a shotgun in hand. |
| 2012-03-06 | Daryl Jerome Berry (45) | Brush Creek Township, Fulton County, Pennsylvania | An officer stopped to investigate a two-vehicle collision and became involved in a struggle with one of the drivers. The suspect repeatedly struck the officer with a metal flashlight. The officer fatally shot the suspect. |
| 2012-03-05 | Kenneth Falcon Gomez (27) | Temple City, California | |
| 2012-03-02 | Julien Robert Gonzalez (24) | Harbor City, Los Angeles, California | |
| 2012-03-01 | Frank Eric Martinez (27) | La Mirada, California | |
| 2012-03-01 | Brandon James Dunbar (26) | Riverside, California | Dunbar was killed during a foot chase after he fled a traffic stop. He allegedly turned toward the officer while holding a gun, and the officer shot him to death. |
| 2012-03-01 | Justin Sipp (20) | New Orleans, Louisiana | |

== See also ==
- Death in custody § United States
- Henry A. Wallace Police Crime Public Database
- List of cases of police brutality
- List of countries with annual rates and counts for killings by law enforcement officers
- List of law enforcement officers killed in the line of duty in the United States
- List of law enforcement officers convicted for an on-duty killing in the United States
- List of shootings by US immigration agents
- List of police reforms related to the George Floyd protests
- List of unarmed African Americans killed by law enforcement officers in the United States
- Lists of killings by law enforcement officers
- Police brutality in the United States
- Police misconduct § United States
- Police riot § United States
- Police use of deadly force in the United States
