= Wood, Pennsylvania =

Unincorporated community in Pennsylvania, US

- Unincorporated community and Census-designated place
- Location within Pennsylvania Location within the United States
- Coordinates: 40°09′58″N 78°08′11″W
- Country: United States
- State: Pennsylvania
- Counties: Bedford, Fulton, Huntingdon
- Townships: Broad Top, Wells, Wood
- Elevation: 1,870 ft (570 m)
- Time zone: UTC-5 (Eastern (EST))
  - Summer (DST): UTC-4 (EDT)
- ZIP code: 16694
- Area code: 814
- GNIS feature ID: 2830942

Wood is an unincorporated community in the U.S. state of Pennsylvania; portions of the community lie in Bedford, Fulton, and Huntingdon counties. The community is 2.4 miles (3.9 km) south of Broad Top City. Wood has a post office with ZIP code 16694, which opened on September 9, 1908.

== Demographics ==
Historical population
Census	Pop.	Note	%±

The United States Census Bureau defined Wood as a census designated place (CDP) in 2023.
