= Wells Tannery, Pennsylvania =

Unincorporated community in Pennsylvania, US

Wells Tannery
- Unincorporated community and census-designated place
- Wells Tannery, Pennsylvania
- Location within Pennsylvania
- Coordinates: 40°05′20″N 78°09′51″W
- Country: United States
- State: Pennsylvania
- County: Fulton
- Elevation: 1,171 ft (357 m)
- Time zone: UTC-5 (Eastern (EST))
  - Summer (DST): UTC-4 (EDT)
- ZIP code: 16691
- Area code: 814
- GNIS feature ID: 2830930

Wells Tannery is an unincorporated community in Fulton County, Pennsylvania, United States. The community is located along Pennsylvania Route 915, 6.2 miles (10.0 km) east-southeast of Hopewell. Wells Tannery has a post office, with ZIP code 16691.

== Demographics ==
Historical population
Census	Pop.	Note	%±

The United States Census Bureau defined Wells Tannery as a census designated place (CDP) in 2023.
