= Hopewell, Bedford County, Pennsylvania =

Borough in Pennsylvania, US

Hopewell, Pennsylvania
- Borough
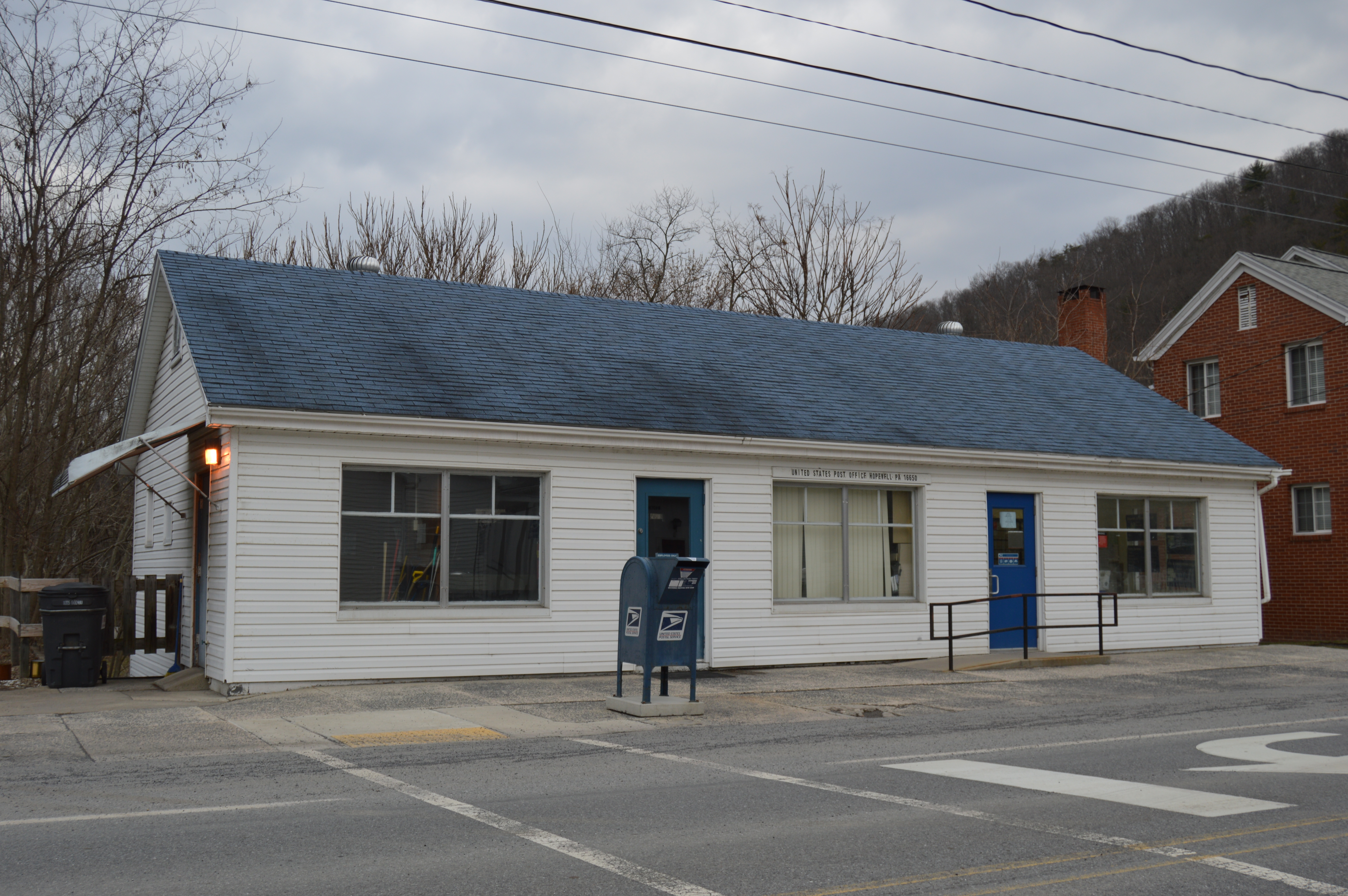
- Post office

- Location of Hopewell in Bedford County, Pennsylvania.

- Location within Pennsylvania
- Coordinates: 40°8′2″N 78°16′0″W
- Country: United States
- State: Pennsylvania
- County: Bedford
- Settled: 1855
- Incorporated: 1895

Government
  - Type: Borough Council
  - Mayor: Sean Michael Currier

Area
  - Total: 0.12 sq mi (0.30 km^{2})
  - Land: 0.11 sq mi (0.29 km^{2})
  - Water: 0.0039 sq mi (0.01 km^{2})

Population (2020)
  - Total: 189
  - Density: 1,662.9/sq mi (642.05/km^{2})
- Time zone: UTC-5 (Eastern (EST))
  - Summer (DST): UTC-4 (EDT)
- Zip code: 16650
- Area code: 814
- FIPS code: 42-35648
- GNIS feature ID: 1214898

Hopewell is a borough in Bedford County, Pennsylvania, United States. The population was 189 at the 2020 census.

== Geography ==
Hopewell is located in northeastern Bedford County in the narrow valley of the Raystown Branch of the Juniata River. Riddlesburg Mountain rises to the east. The borough is bordered on the east by Broad Top Township and on the west by Hopewell Township.

Pennsylvania Route 915 passes through the borough as Water Street and Front Street. It leads southeast 7 miles (11 km) to Wells Tannery and 14 miles (23 km) to U.S. Route 30 on top of Sideling Hill. To the north it ends just outside the borough at Pennsylvania Route 26, which leads southwest 14 miles (23 km) to Everett and northeast 32 miles (51 km) to Huntingdon.

According to the United States Census Bureau, Hopewell has a total area of 0.11 square miles (0.29 km^{2}), all land.

== Demographics ==
Historical population
Census	Pop.	Note	%±
1900	482		—
1910	590		22.4%
1920	516		−12.5%
1930	430		−16.7%
1940	405		−5.8%
1950	360		−11.1%
1960	301		−16.4%
1970	290		−3.7%
1980	256		−11.7%
1990	194		−24.2%
2000	222		14.4%
2010	230		3.6%
2020	189		−17.8%
2021 (est.)	187		−1.1%

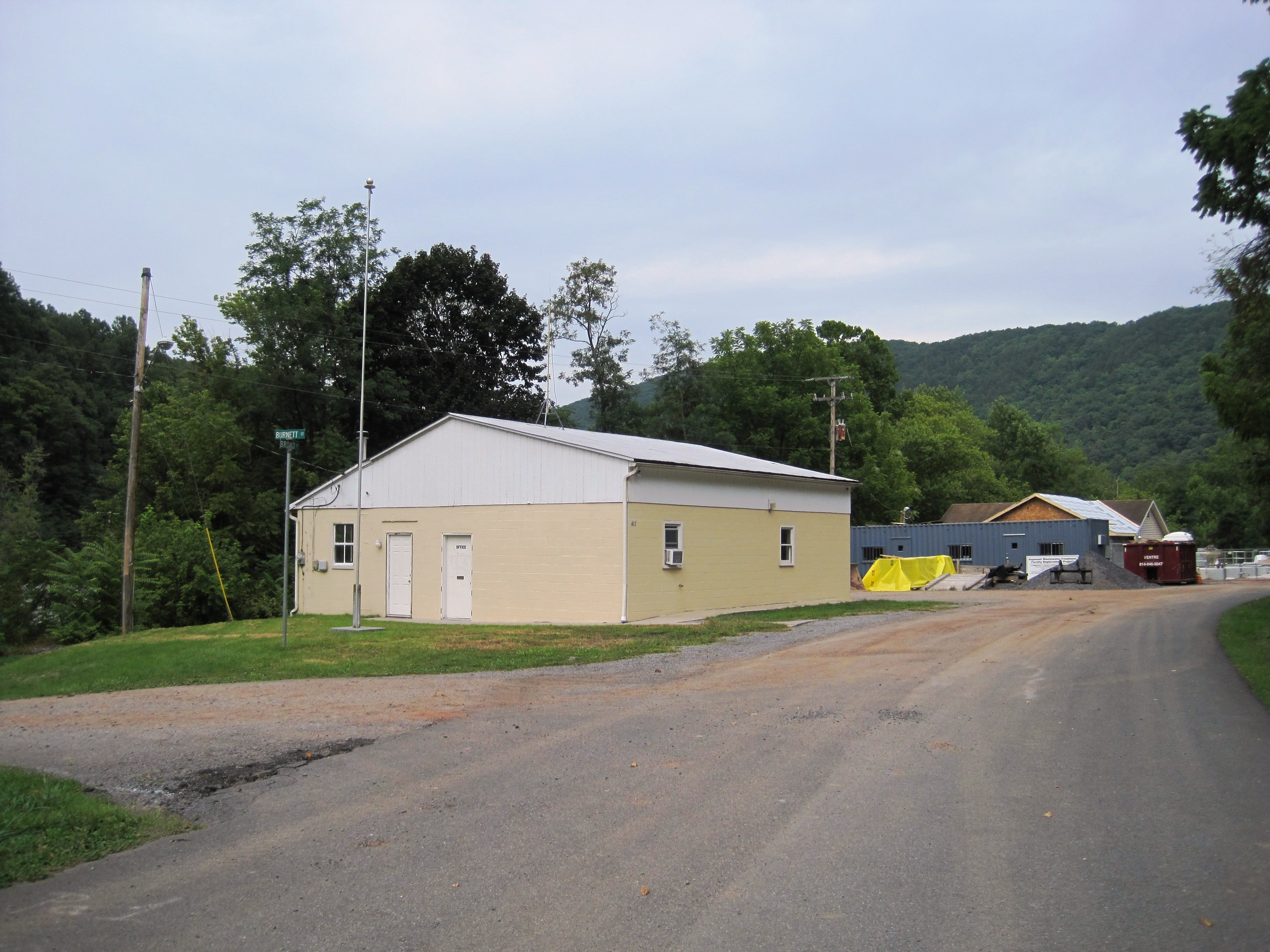
Hopewell Borough Hall

As of the census of 2000, there were 222 people, 90 households, and 51 families residing in the borough. The population density was 1,836.9 inhabitants per square mile (709.2/km^{2}). There were 111 housing units at an average density of 918.4 units per square mile (354.6 units/km^{2}). The racial makeup of the borough was 100.00% White.

There were 90 households, out of which 30.0% had children under the age of 18 living with them, 47.8% were married couples living together, 7.8% had a female householder with no husband present, and 43.3% were non-families. 40.0% of all households were made up of individuals, and 24.4% had someone living alone who was 65 years of age or older. The average household size was 2.47 and the average family size was 3.39.

In the borough the population was spread out, with 28.8% under the age of 18, 4.5% from 18 to 24, 28.4% from 25 to 44, 21.2% from 45 to 64, and 17.1% who were 65 years of age or older. The median age was 36 years. For every 100 females there were 93.0 males. For every 100 females age 18 and over, there were 85.9 males.

The median income for a household in the borough was $24,500, and the median income for a family was $35,417. Males had a median income of $25,833 versus $14,000 for females. The per capita income for the borough was $11,438. About 17.0% of families and 20.3% of the population were below the poverty line, including 22.6% of those under the age of eighteen and 23.4% of those sixty five or over.
