= Town Hill (Maryland−Pennsylvania) =

Mountain range in Maryland and Pennsylvania

Coordinates: 39°43′29″N 78°22′44″W

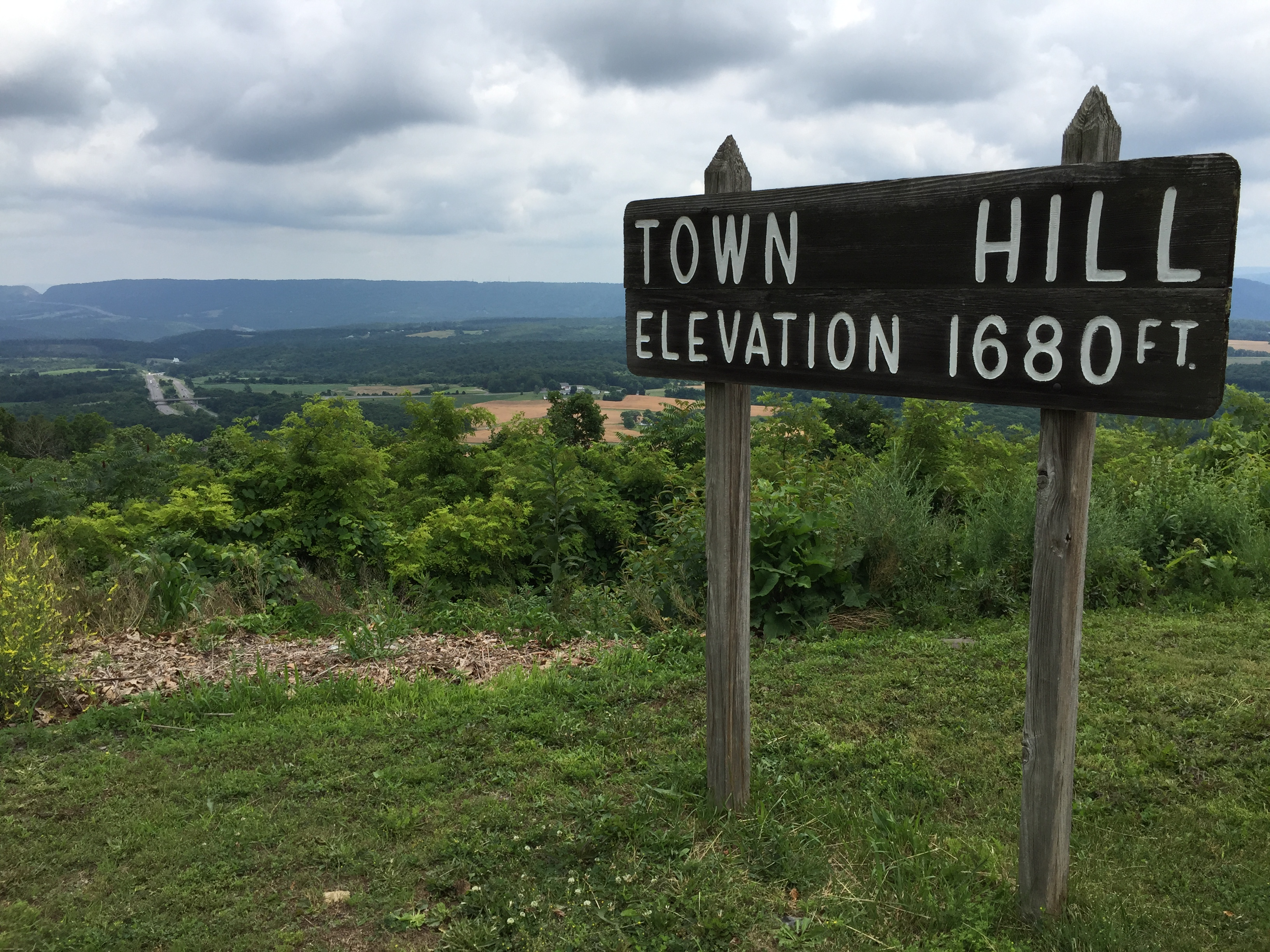
Elevation sign on Town Hill, overlooking I-68/US 40; the Sideling Hill road cut shown distant left

Town Hill is a mountain range that is located in Allegany County, Maryland and Bedford and Fulton counties in Pennsylvania.

== Description ==
The southern end of this mountain range is 2.25 miles northwest of Kiefer in Allegany County. It trends northeasterly, and ends about 1.5 miles south of the town of Emmaville in Fulton County. Its highest elevation is 2000 feet.

Interstate 70 crosses Town Hill at a narrow angle to the mountain, following the ridge for four to five miles as it slowly climbs one side and descends the other. In Maryland, Interstate 68 skirts the southern edge of the mountain while the original alignment of U.S. Route 40, now signed as U.S. Route 40 Scenic, crosses over it.

Part of Buchanan State Forest lies on Town Hill in Fulton County.

South of the Potomac River in Hampshire County, West Virginia, Town Hill rises to a height of 1,306 feet (398 m).

== Geology ==
Town Hill is held up by the Mississippian age Pocono Formation, which dips to the northwest. The Mississippian-Devonian Rockwell Formation and Devonian Catskill Formation are exposed on the southeast flank of the mountain below the Pocono. Rays Hill, to the east, and Town Hill form a syncline.
