= 1928 United States presidential election in Pennsylvania =

- November 6, 1928

Nominee	Herbert Hoover	Al Smith
Party	Republican	Democratic
Home state	California	New York
Running mate	Charles Curtis	Joseph T. Robinson
Electoral vote	38	0
Popular vote	2,055,382	1,069,569
Percentage	65.24%	33.89%
County results
Hoover
50–60%
60–70%
70–80%
80–90%
Smith
50–60%
President before election
Calvin Coolidge
Republican
Elected President
Herbert Hoover
Republican

The 1928 United States presidential election in Pennsylvania took place on November 6, 1928, as part of the 1928 United States presidential election. Voters chose 38 representatives, or electors to the Electoral College, who voted for president and vice president.

Pennsylvania overwhelmingly voted for the Republican nominee, former U.S. Secretary of Commerce Herbert Hoover, over the Democratic nominee, New York Governor Al Smith. Hoover won Pennsylvania by a landslide margin of 31.35%. The Republicans at this time were associated with the booming economy of the 1920s while Smith was associated with the corruption of Tammany Hall.

Despite losing the state, Smith flipped 3 majority-Catholic counties that voted for Calvin Coolidge in 1924 and had been consistently Republican during the "System of 1896" into the Democratic column: Elk, Lackawanna, and Luzerne. This came with losing the 4 counties – all dominated by profoundly anti-Catholic Appalachian Protestants – that voted for John W. Davis to Hoover: Columbia, Fulton, Greene, and Monroe. Hoover was also the first ever Republican to carry Columbia, Greene, and Monroe counties. This was the last time Pennsylvania voted in a presidential election with 38 electoral votes, the most it has ever had.

== Results ==
1928 United States presidential election in Pennsylvania
Party	Candidate	Votes	Percentage	Electoral votes
Republican	Herbert Hoover	2,055,382	65.24%	38
Democratic	Al Smith	1,067,586	33.89%	0
Socialist	Norman Thomas	18,647	0.59%	0
Communist/Workers'/Labor	William Z. Foster	4,726	0.15%	0
Prohibition	William F. Varney	3,875	0.12%	0
Socialist Labor	Verne L. Reynolds	380	0.01%	0
Write-ins	Write-ins	14	0.00%	0
Totals		3,147,882	100.00%	38

=== Results by county ===
County	Herbert Clark Hoover Republican		Alfred Emmanual Smith Democratic		Various candidates Other parties		Margin		Total votes cast
County	#	%	#	%	#	%	#	%	Total votes cast
Adams	9,656	67.29%	4,635	32.30%	58	0.40%	5,021	34.99%	14,349
Allegheny	215,626	56.86%	160,733	42.39%	2,850	0.75%	54,893	14.48%	379,209
Armstrong	17,625	77.86%	4,824	21.31%	187	0.83%	12,801	56.55%	22,636
Beaver	27,949	69.50%	11,868	29.51%	400	0.99%	16,081	39.99%	40,217
Bedford	9,602	81.60%	1,966	16.71%	199	1.69%	7,636	64.89%	11,767
Berks	47,073	64.03%	18,960	25.79%	7,481	10.18%	28,113	38.24%	73,514
Blair	34,356	73.53%	12,104	25.90%	266	0.57%	22,252	47.62%	46,726
Bradford	17,251	79.83%	4,281	19.81%	77	0.36%	12,970	60.02%	21,609
Bucks	28,421	76.47%	8,446	22.72%	301	0.81%	19,975	53.74%	37,168
Butler	19,880	85.22%	3,283	14.07%	164	0.70%	16,597	71.15%	23,327
Cambria	29,494	51.79%	27,024	47.46%	427	0.75%	2,470	4.34%	56,945
Cameron	1,564	75.52%	501	24.19%	6	0.29%	1,063	51.33%	2,071
Carbon	15,047	64.98%	8,010	34.59%	98	0.42%	7,037	30.39%	23,155
Centre	12,005	77.17%	3,431	22.05%	121	0.78%	8,574	55.11%	15,557
Chester	36,659	82.27%	7,689	17.26%	210	0.47%	28,970	65.02%	44,558
Clarion	9,183	70.43%	3,746	28.73%	109	0.84%	5,437	41.70%	13,038
Clearfield	16,719	67.26%	7,870	31.66%	270	1.09%	8,849	35.60%	24,859
Clinton	8,120	73.62%	2,849	25.83%	60	0.54%	5,271	47.79%	11,029
Columbia	14,362	72.61%	5,304	26.81%	115	0.58%	9,058	45.79%	19,781
Crawford	17,072	71.17%	6,718	28.00%	199	0.83%	10,354	43.16%	23,989
Cumberland	19,170	78.08%	5,189	21.14%	192	0.78%	13,981	56.95%	24,551
Dauphin	49,108	83.78%	9,115	15.55%	394	0.67%	39,993	68.23%	58,617
Delaware	83,092	73.57%	29,378	26.01%	471	0.42%	53,714	47.56%	112,941
Elk	5,234	40.23%	7,705	59.23%	70	0.54%	-2,471	-18.99%	13,009
Erie	30,542	60.97%	19,278	38.48%	277	0.55%	11,264	22.48%	50,097
Fayette	27,693	58.69%	19,063	40.40%	427	0.90%	8,630	18.29%	47,183
Forest	1,707	84.59%	289	14.32%	22	1.09%	1,418	70.27%	2,018
Franklin	16,345	83.74%	3,027	15.51%	146	0.75%	13,318	68.23%	19,518
Fulton	2,179	66.82%	1,054	32.32%	28	0.86%	1,125	34.50%	3,261
Greene	6,910	56.18%	5,293	43.04%	96	0.78%	1,617	13.15%	12,299
Huntingdon	9,920	86.25%	1,470	12.78%	112	0.97%	8,450	73.47%	11,502
Indiana	16,706	76.75%	4,810	22.10%	252	1.16%	11,896	54.65%	21,768
Jefferson	13,233	74.63%	4,325	24.39%	173	0.98%	8,908	50.24%	17,731
Juniata	4,396	82.00%	919	17.14%	46	0.86%	3,477	64.86%	5,361
Lackawanna	46,510	46.85%	52,665	53.05%	94	0.09%	-6,155	-6.20%	99,269
Lancaster	55,530	81.43%	12,146	17.81%	516	0.76%	43,384	63.62%	68,192
Lawrence	20,012	74.95%	6,417	24.03%	273	1.02%	13,595	50.91%	26,702
Lebanon	16,841	82.30%	3,278	16.02%	345	1.69%	13,563	66.28%	20,464
Lehigh	40,291	74.35%	13,463	24.84%	434	0.80%	26,828	49.51%	54,188
Luzerne	67,872	48.00%	73,319	51.85%	220	0.16%	-5,447	-3.85%	141,411
Lycoming	28,720	79.48%	7,132	19.74%	285	0.79%	21,588	59.74%	36,137
McKean	14,012	73.49%	4,964	26.04%	90	0.47%	9,048	47.46%	19,066
Mercer	22,599	72.71%	8,204	26.39%	280	0.90%	14,395	46.31%	31,083
Mifflin	8,932	86.97%	1,270	12.37%	68	0.66%	7,662	74.61%	10,270
Monroe	7,469	69.40%	3,266	30.35%	27	0.25%	4,203	39.05%	10,762
Montgomery	76,680	76.37%	23,026	22.93%	702	0.70%	53,654	53.44%	100,408
Montour	3,692	71.69%	1,445	28.06%	13	0.25%	2,247	43.63%	5,150
Northampton	37,403	71.14%	14,768	28.09%	404	0.77%	22,635	43.05%	52,575
Northumberland	30,949	61.30%	19,249	38.12%	292	0.58%	11,700	23.17%	50,490
Perry	6,469	77.66%	1,807	21.69%	54	0.65%	4,662	55.97%	8,330
Philadelphia	420,320	59.99%	276,573	39.48%	3,703	0.53%	143,747	20.52%	700,596
Pike	2,354	69.34%	1,024	30.16%	17	0.50%	1,330	39.18%	3,395
Potter	5,653	79.50%	1,416	19.91%	42	0.59%	4,237	59.58%	7,111
Schuylkill	46,033	53.05%	40,424	46.59%	311	0.36%	5,609	6.46%	86,768
Snyder	5,693	87.22%	805	12.33%	29	0.44%	4,888	74.89%	6,527
Somerset	16,404	77.90%	4,489	21.32%	164	0.78%	11,915	56.58%	21,057
Sullivan	2,044	64.64%	1,101	34.82%	17	0.54%	943	29.82%	3,162
Susquehanna	9,445	68.14%	4,353	31.40%	63	0.45%	5,092	36.74%	13,861
Tioga	11,774	87.23%	1,688	12.51%	36	0.27%	10,086	74.72%	13,498
Union	5,708	87.45%	765	11.72%	54	0.83%	4,943	75.73%	6,527
Venango	17,450	79.00%	4,531	20.51%	108	0.49%	12,919	58.49%	22,089
Warren	12,077	80.21%	2,835	18.83%	144	0.96%	9,242	61.38%	15,056
Washington	31,099	63.61%	17,149	35.07%	645	1.32%	13,950	28.53%	48,893
Wayne	8,576	71.15%	3,418	28.36%	59	0.49%	5,158	42.79%	12,053
Westmoreland	51,760	61.88%	30,587	36.57%	1,296	1.55%	21,173	25.31%	83,643
Wyoming	5,321	85.00%	906	14.47%	33	0.53%	4,415	70.53%	6,260
York	45,791	79.60%	11,216	19.50%	522	0.91%	34,575	60.10%	57,529
Totals	2,055,382	65.29%	1,064,856	33.83%	27,644	0.88%	990,526	31.47%	3,147,882

==== Counties that flipped from Democratic to Republican ====
- Columbia
- Fulton
- Greene
- Monroe

==== Counties that flipped from Republican to Democratic ====
- Elk
- Lackawanna
- Luzerne

== See also ==
- United States presidential elections in Pennsylvania
