= Needmore, Pennsylvania =

Unincorporated community in Pennsylvania, US

- Census-designated place
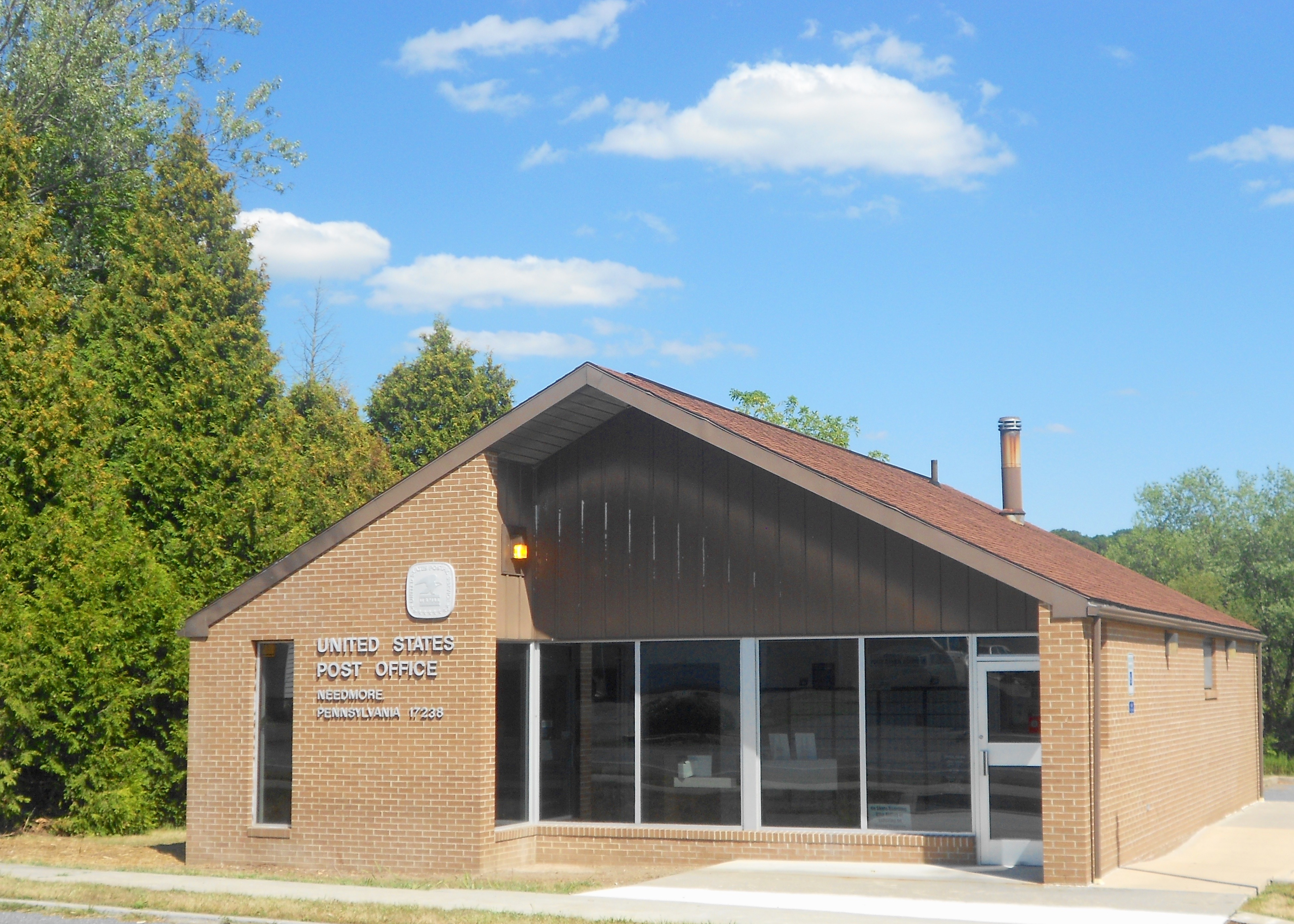
- Needmore post office

- Location within Pennsylvania Location within the United States
- Coordinates: 39°50′51″N 78°08′35″W
- Country: United States
- State: Pennsylvania
- County: Fulton
- Township: Belfast

Area
  - Total: 0.46 sq mi (1.18 km^{2})
  - Land: 0.46 sq mi (1.18 km^{2})
  - Water: 0 sq mi (0.00 km^{2})
- Elevation: 617 ft (188 m)

Population (2020)
  - Total: 153
  - Density: 336.7/sq mi (130.01/km^{2})
- Time zone: UTC-4 (EST)
  - Summer (DST): UTC-5 (EDT)
- ZIP code: 17238
- Area code: 717
- FIPS code: 42-52872
- GNIS feature ID: 2630029

Needmore is an unincorporated community and census-designated place (CDP) in Fulton County, Pennsylvania, United States. As of the 2010 census, the population was 170. Needmore was created on April 27, 1954.

== Geography ==
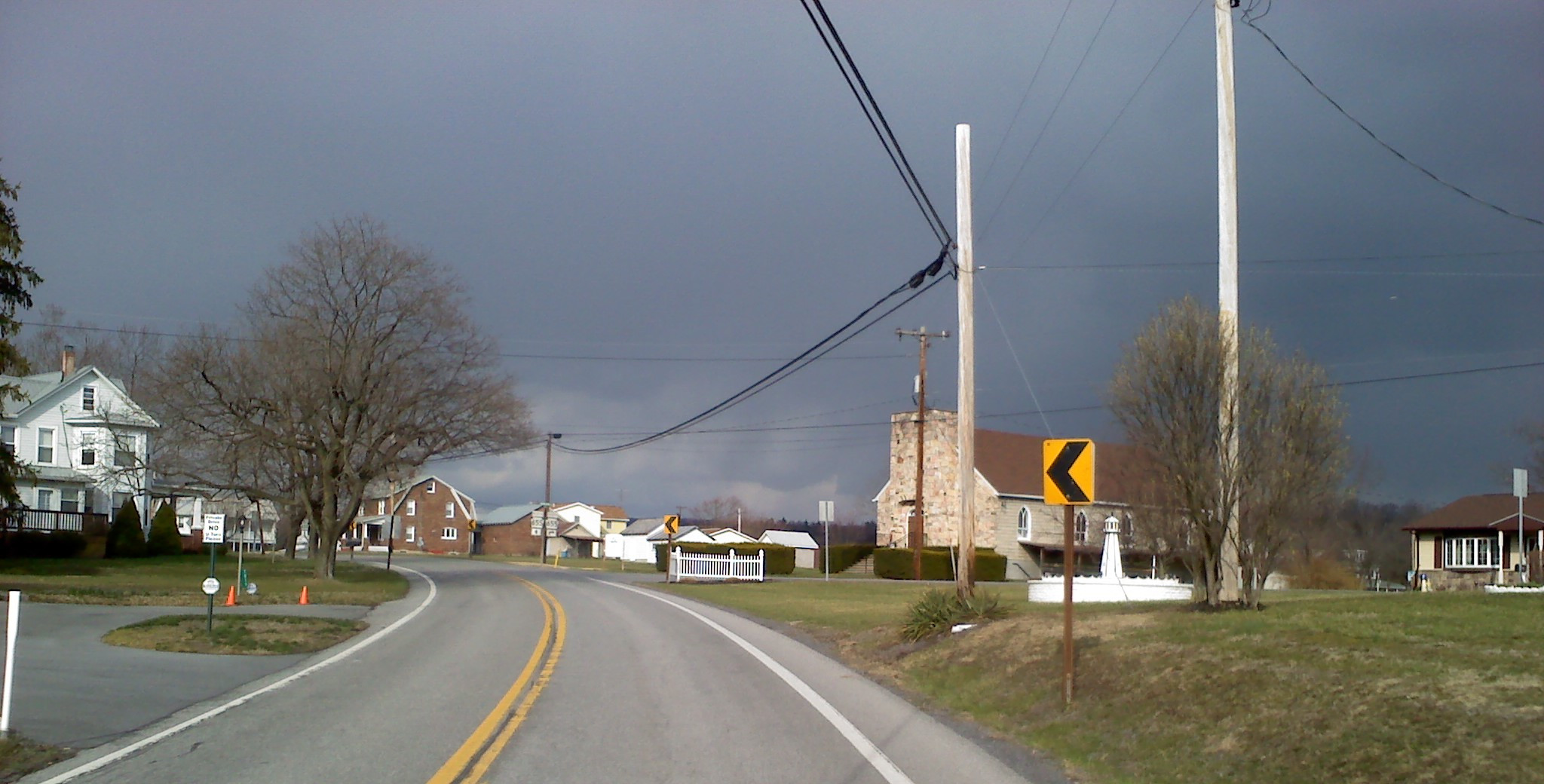
Needmore from Route 522

Needmore is in south-central Fulton County, at the intersection of U.S. Route 522 (Great Cove Road) and Route 655 (Thompson Road) in Belfast Township. US 522 leads south 7 miles (11 km) to Interstate 70 at Warfordsburg and northeast 13 miles (21 km) to McConnellsburg, the Fulton County seat. PA 655 leads south 9 miles (14 km) to the Maryland border (the Mason–Dixon line). Hancock, Maryland, is 11 miles (18 km) south via PA 655 and 12 miles (19 km) south via US 522.

The community is located in the valley of Tonoloway Creek, a southward-flowing tributary of the Potomac River. The north end of Tonoloway Ridge rises just south of Needmore.

== Demographics ==
Historical population
Census	Pop.	Note	%±
2020	153		—
U.S. Decennial Census

== Geology ==
The Devonian geologic formation called the Needmore Formation is named after the town of Needmore.
