= Valley-Hi, Pennsylvania =

Borough in Pennsylvania, US

- Borough
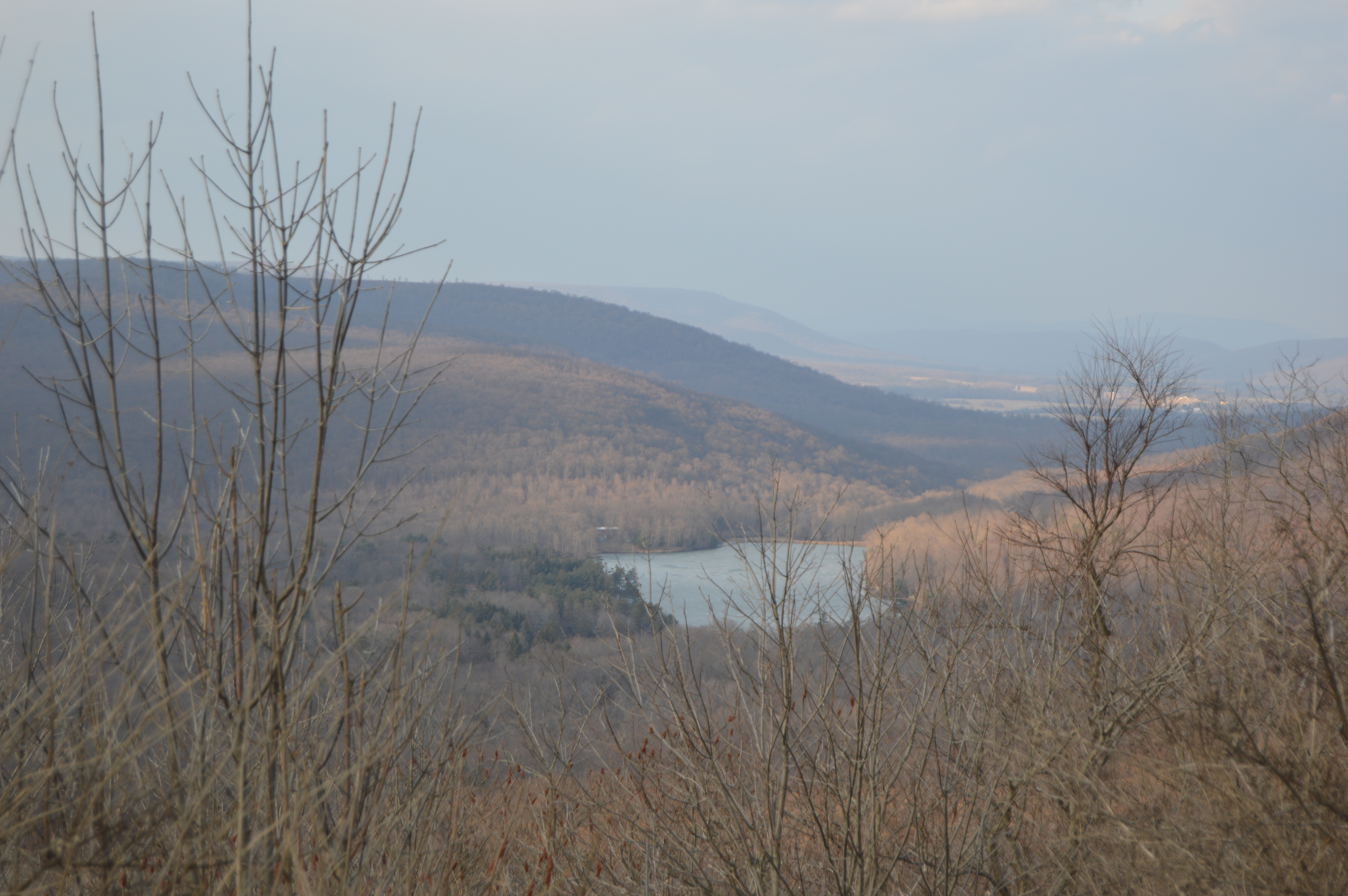
- Overview from US Route 30

- Location of Valley-Hi in Fulton County, Pennsylvania.

- Location of Valley-Hi in Pennsylvania Valley-Hi (the United States)
- Coordinates: 40°01′34″N 78°11′46″W
- Country: United States
- State: Pennsylvania
- County: Fulton County
- Incorporated: December 31, 1973

Area
  - Total: 0.57 sq mi (1.47 km^{2})
  - Land: 0.51 sq mi (1.31 km^{2})
  - Water: 0.066 sq mi (0.17 km^{2})
- Elevation: 1,352 ft (412 m)

Population (2020)
  - Total: 6 ▼
  - Density: 29.8/sq mi (11.49/km^{2})
- Time zone: UTC-4 (EST)
  - Summer (DST): UTC-5 (EDT)
- ZIP code: 15533
- Area code: 814
- FIPS code: 42-057-79644
- GNIS feature ID: 2086651

Valley-Hi is a borough in Fulton County, Pennsylvania, United States. The population was 7 at the 2020 census.

== History ==
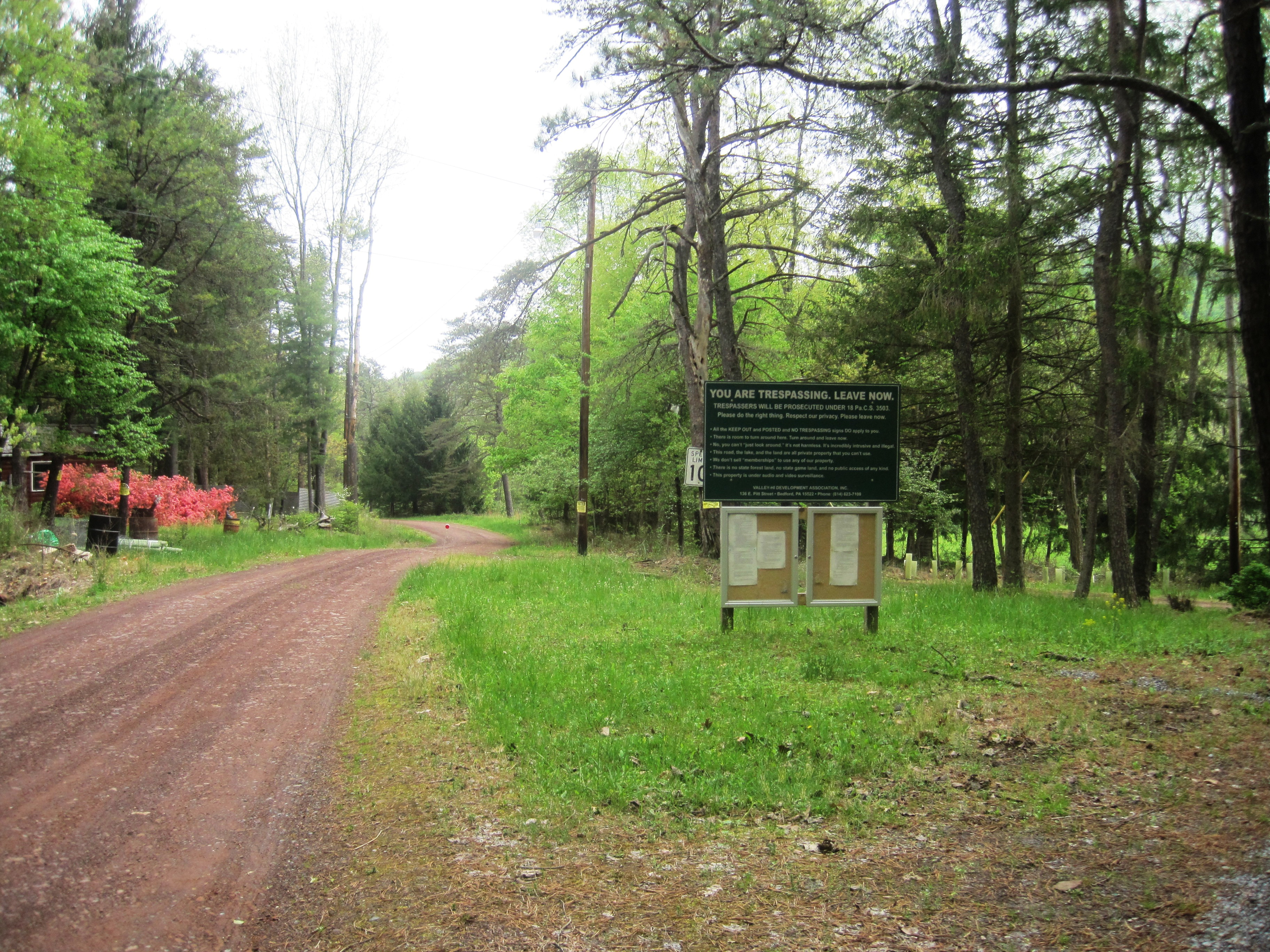
Sign in the borough noting the land is owned by the Valley-Hi Development Association and that trespassing is prohibited

Land around Valley-Hi Eagle Lake was purchased by developer Jack Gothie in the 1960s who was originally intending to develop a new ski resort there due to its easy access from the Pennsylvania Turnpike and U.S. Route 30. The ski resort was not built, but he did retain the land and built houses around the lake. Following the construction of a bypass of two tunnels along the Turnpike, Gothie received compensation and an additional piece of land. A piece of road that was intended for public access was blocked by Gothie in 1973.

Valley-Hi borough was established in late 1973 when Gothie and a group of residents petitioned Fulton County to create the county's second borough (after McConnellsburg). Gothie claimed the proposal was wanted so that police and fire services could be provided to the residents of his development. His intent was to keep the access road to the borough and any municipal services private and owned by the Valley-Hi Development Corporation (later renamed Valley-Hi Development Association). An application was submitted and with no objections from the county nor Brush Creek Township, the township from which the borough would be created, the borough was incorporated on December 31, 1973. However, the Fulton County commissioners later filed a challenge to the original petition claiming the state election code requires voting districts to have at least 100 voters thus a borough mayor, council members, and other offices could not be elected. The borough's status was in limbo through the late 1970s with the Fulton County commissioners wanting to dissolve it but Commonwealth Court of Pennsylvania judges ruling to reinstate it, with the final ruling coming in September 1980. Jack Gothie would be elected to serve as mayor or councilman of the borough until his death in 1997.

== Geography ==
Valley-Hi is located in northwestern Fulton County.

According to the United States Census Bureau, the borough has a total area of 0.58 square miles (1.5 km^{2}), of which 0.50 square miles (1.3 km^{2}) is land and 0.08 square miles (0.2 km^{2}), or 11.36%, is water, consisting of a reservoir around which the community is situated.

== Demographics ==
Historical population
Census	Pop.	Note	%±
1980	8		—
1990	19		137.5%
2000	20		5.3%
2010	15		−25.0%
2020	6		−60.0%
2021 (est.)	7	▲	16.7%

=== 2010 census ===
At the 2010 census, there were 15 people, 6 households, and 5 families residing within the borough. The population density was 30.0 inhabitants per square mile (11.6/km^{2}). There were 30 housing units at an average density of 60.0 per square mile (23.2/km^{2}). The racial makeup of the borough was 100% White.

There were 6 households, 2 had children under the age of 18 living with them, 83.3% were headed by married couples living together, and 16.7% were non-families. 16.7% of households were made up of individuals, and none had someone living alone who was 65 or older. The average household size was 2.50, and the average family size was 2.80.

The age distribution was 26.7% under age 18, 0% from 18 to 24, 46.6% from 25 to 44, 6.7% from 45 to 64, and 20.0% 65 or older. The median age was 38.5 years. For every 100 females there were 114.3 males. For every 100 females age 18 and over, there were 83.3 males.

=== 2000 census ===
At the 2000 census there were 20 people, 7 households, and 4 families in the borough. The population density was 39.7 inhabitants per square mile (15.3/km^{2}). There were 29 housing units at an average density of 57.5 per square mile (22.2/km^{2}). The racial makeup of the borough was 100.00% White. There were 7 households, out of which none had children under the age of 18 living with them, 71.4% were married couples living together, and 28.6% were non-families. 28.6% of households were made up of individuals, and none had someone living alone who was 65 or older. The average household size was 2.86 and the average family size was 3.40.

The age distribution was 10.0% from 18 to 24, 30.0% from 25 to 44, 50.0% from 45 to 64, and 10.0% 65 or older. The median age was 56 years. For every 100 females there were 66.7 males. For every 100 females age 18 and over, there were 66.7 males.

The median household income was $28,750 and the median family income was $16,250. Males had a median income of $0 versus $19,583 for females. The per capita income for the borough was $17,677. There are 33.3% of families living below the poverty line and 15.4% of the population, including no under eighteens and none of those over 64.
