= Rays Hill =

Mountain ridge in Pennsylvania

Coordinates: 39°54′20″N 78°15′58″W

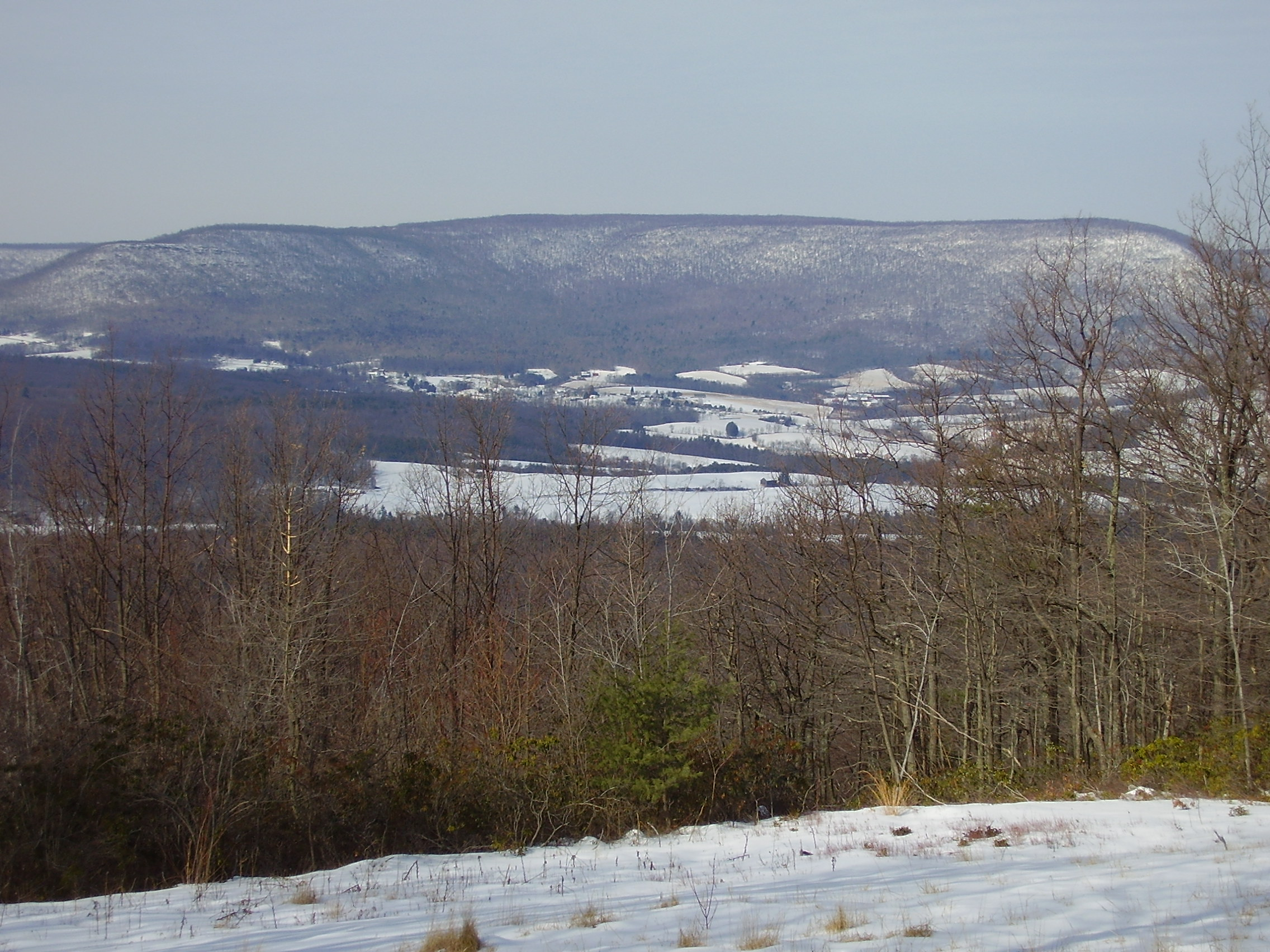
- View of Rays Hill from Sideling Hill

Highest point
- Elevation: 2,443 ft (745 m)

Geography
- Location: Bedford / Fulton / Huntingdon counties, Pennsylvania, U.S.
- Parent range: Appalachian Mountains

Rays Hill is a mountain ridge in Pennsylvania's Ridge and Valley Appalachians region. It is bordered to the east by Sideling Hill. About halfway along its run, the west side of Rays Hill ties into Broad Top Mountain, a large plateau.

On its west it is bordered by Tussey Mountain south of Broad Top Mountain and Rocky Ridge north of Broad Top Mountain. The ridge is known both as "Rays" and "Wrays." To the north of Broad Top Mountain it is most often spelled "Wrays" and to the south most often "Rays."

The southern section holds the Rays Hill Tunnel, one of the abandoned tunnels of the Pennsylvania Turnpike. The northern section holds Wrays Hill Tunnel, one of two on the East Broad Top Railroad.

== Geology ==
This mountain ridge forms the boundary between Bedford and Fulton counties in south central Pennsylvania, and also extends northward into Huntingdon County.

Rays Hill is held up by the Mississippian Pocono Formation, which dips to the southeast. The Mississippian-Devonian Rockwell Formation and Devonian Catskill Formation are exposed on the northwest flank of the mountain below the Pocono. Town Hill, to the west, and Rays Hill form a syncline.

Part of Buchanan State Forest lies on Rays Hill.
