= Broad Top =

Plateau in south-central Pennsylvania, United States

Coordinates: 40.205°N 78.146°W

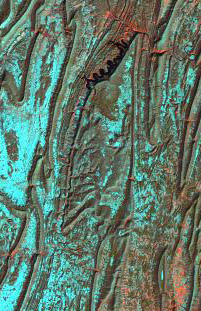
Landsat image of Broad Top taken 14 Jan 2010

Broad Top is a plateau located in south-central Pennsylvania. It extends into Huntingdon County to the north, Fulton County to the southeast, and Bedford County to the southwest. It is bounded to the west by Saxton Mountain and Terrace Mountain, and to the east by Sideling Hill. In Bedford County, Harbor Mountain forms the southern boundary. Trough Creek Valley lies between the mountains.

== State Lands ==
Pennsylvania State Game Lands 67, 121, and 267 lie on Broad Top. Part of Rothrock State Forest lies on Broad Top as well, as is most of Trough Creek State Park in Huntingdon County.

== Geology ==
The bedrock of Broad Top consists of relatively flat-lying Paleozoic sedimentary rocks that are stratigraphically higher, and thus younger than the rocks immediately surrounding the plateau. Mapped formations on the plateau include the Mississippian-Devonian Rockwell Formation, the Mississippian Pocono Formation and Mauch Chunk Formation, and the Pennsylvanian Pottsville Group, Allegheny Formation, and Conemaugh Group.

Although Broad Top lies within the Ridge and Valley Physiographic Province, it is actually more similar to the Allegheny Plateau due to its flat-lying rocks and stratigraphic similarity to rocks there.

Bituminous coal has been mined in the Broad Top area, and the coal field is known as the Broad Top Field. Nearly all of the coal lies within the Allegheny Formation. Abandoned mines exist in the area and acid mine drainage is an environmental problem, where several fishless streams exist as a result of the discharge from the abandoned mines.
