= Fulton County, Pennsylvania =

County in Pennsylvania, United States

- County
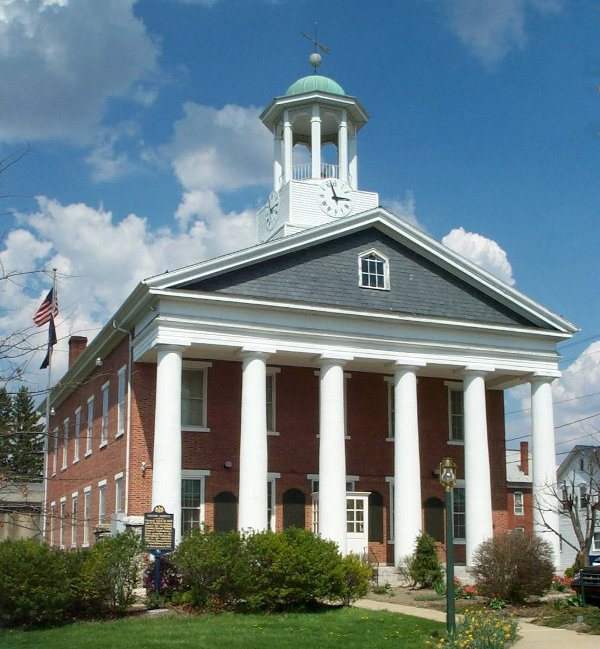
- The Fulton County Courthouse

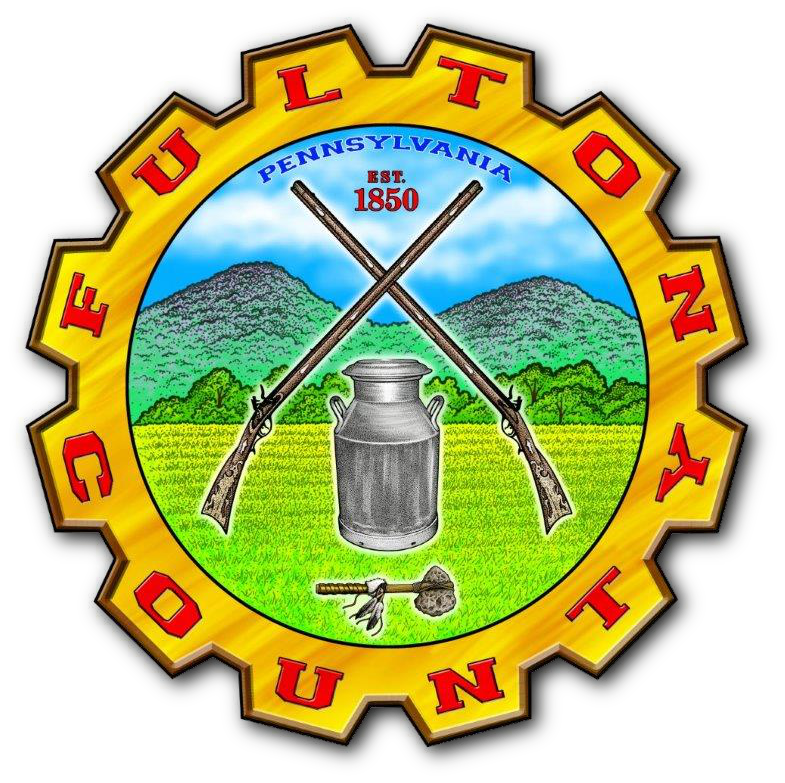
- Seal

- Location within the U.S. state of Pennsylvania
- Coordinates: 39°55′N 78°07′W
- Country: United States
- State: Pennsylvania
- Founded: April 19, 1850
- Named for: Robert Fulton
- Seat: McConnellsburg
- Largest borough: McConnellsburg

Area
  - Total: 438 sq mi (1,130 km^{2})
  - Land: 438 sq mi (1,130 km^{2})
  - Water: 0.5 sq mi (1.3 km^{2}) 0.1%

Population (2020)
  - Total: 14,556
  - Estimate (2025): 14,483 ▼
  - Density: 33/sq mi (13/km^{2})
- Time zone: UTC−5 (Eastern)
  - Summer (DST): UTC−4 (EDT)
- Congressional district: 13th
- Website: www.co.fulton.pa.us

Fulton County is a county in the Commonwealth of Pennsylvania. As of the 2020 census, the population was 14,556, making it the fourth-least populous county in Pennsylvania. Its county seat is McConnellsburg. The county was created on April 19, 1850, from a part of Bedford County and named after inventor Robert Fulton. The county is part of the south-central region of the commonwealth. (Note: Includes Westmoreland, Cambria, Fayette, Blair, Indiana, Somerset, Bedford, Huntingdon, Greene and Fulton Counties)

== Geography ==
According to the U.S. Census Bureau, the county has a total area of 438 square miles (1,130 km^{2}), of which 438 square miles (1,130 km^{2}) is land and 0.5 square miles (1.3 km^{2}) (0.1%) is water. It is in the watershed of the Chesapeake Bay and, although most of the county is drained by the Potomac River, some northern and northeastern areas are drained by the Juniata River into the Susquehanna River. It has a humid continental climate (Dfa/Dfb) and average monthly temperatures in McConnellsburg range from 29.2 °F in January to 73.0 °F in July. Fulton County is one of the 423 counties served by the Appalachian Regional Commission, and it is identified as part of "Greater Appalachia" by Colin Woodard in his book American Nations: A History of the Eleven Rival Regional Cultures of North America.

=== Adjacent counties ===
- Huntingdon County (north)
- Franklin County (east)
- Washington County, Maryland (south)
- Allegany County, Maryland (southwest)
- Bedford County (west)

== Geology ==
Fulton County is situated within the Ridge and Valley physiographic province, which is characterized by folded and faulted sedimentary rocks of early to middle Paleozoic age.

The stratigraphic record of sedimentary rocks within the county spans from the Cambrian Shadygrove Formation outcropping just south of McConnellsburg to the Pennsylvanian Allegheny Group at the northernmost tip of the county. No igneous or metamorphic rocks of any kind exist within Fulton county.

Mountain ridges within Fulton County include Rays Hill (along the western border with Bedford County), Town Hill, Sideling Hill, Scrub Ridge, and Meadow Grounds Mountain, and all these are held up by the Mississippian Pocono Formation, made of quartz sandstone and conglomerate. Rays Hill and Town Hill form a syncline, as do Scrub Ridge and Meadow Grounds Mountain, and Sideling Hill itself is a syncline. Dickeys Mountain and Tuscarora Mountain (along the eastern border with Franklin County) also form a syncline, but these ridges are held up by the Tuscarora Formation. Broad Top, located in the northeast corner of the county, is a plateau of relatively flat-lying rocks that are stratigraphically higher, and thus younger (Mississippian and Pennsylvanian), than most of the other rocks within the county. Broad Top extends into Huntingdon County to the north and Bedford County to the west.

All of Fulton County lies far to the south of the terminal moraine, and thus it was never glaciated. However, during the Pleistocene epoch, or "Ice Age," periglacial (meaning "around glacier" or simply "cold") processes dominated. Most of the county was most likely a tundra during the Pleistocene.

The Broad Top Coal Field is located in Wells Township in the northwestern corner of the county. The field contains bituminous coal. There are a few abandoned mines in the area, although acid mine drainage is not as much of an environmental problem in Fulton County as it is in adjacent Bedford and Huntingdon Counties.

Interesting geologic features within Fulton County include some of the following:

- The Meadow Grounds syncline west of McConnellsburg.
- A transpression structure is located on the east side of the Meadow Grounds syncline. This structure consists of a complex set of up-thrust fault blocks of Silurian and Devonian rocks bounded on all sides by north-trending faults.

== Demographics ==
Historical population
Census	Pop.	Note	%±
1850	7,567		—
1860	9,131		20.7%
1870	9,360		2.5%
1880	10,149		8.4%
1890	10,137		−0.1%
1900	9,924		−2.1%
1910	9,703		−2.2%
1920	9,617		−0.9%
1930	9,231		−4.0%
1940	10,673		15.6%
1950	10,387		−2.7%
1960	10,597		2.0%
1970	10,776		1.7%
1980	12,842		19.2%
1990	13,837		7.7%
2000	14,261		3.1%
2010	14,845		4.1%
2020	14,556		−1.9%
2025 (est.)	14,483	▼	−0.5%

=== 2020 census ===
As of the 2020 census, the county had a population of 14,556. The median age was 45.3 years. 20.9% of residents were under the age of 18 and 21.9% of residents were 65 years of age or older. For every 100 females there were 100.6 males, and for every 100 females age 18 and over there were 98.4 males age 18 and over.

The racial makeup of the county was 94.3% White (NH), 0.85% Black or African American (NH), 0.17% Native American (NH), 0.3% Asian (NH), 0.02% Pacific Islander (NH), 3.4% Other/Mixed (NH), and 1.0% Hispanic or Latino of any race.

<0.1% of residents lived in urban areas, while 100.0% lived in rural areas.

There were 6,087 households in the county, of which 27.3% had children under the age of 18 living in them. Of all households, 51.5% were married-couple households, 18.6% were households with a male householder and no spouse or partner present, and 21.9% were households with a female householder and no spouse or partner present. About 28.1% of all households were made up of individuals and 14.2% had someone living alone who was 65 years of age or older.

There were 7,100 housing units, of which 14.3% were vacant. Among occupied housing units, 75.0% were owner-occupied and 25.0% were renter-occupied. The homeowner vacancy rate was 1.1% and the rental vacancy rate was 5.2%.

Fulton County, Pennsylvania – Racial and ethnic composition Note: the US Census treats Hispanic/Latino as an ethnic category. This table excludes Latinos from the racial categories and assigns them to a separate category. Hispanics/Latinos may be of any race.
Race / Ethnicity (NH = Non-Hispanic)	Pop 2000	Pop 2010	Pop 2020	% 2000	% 2010	% 2020
White alone (NH)	13,978	14,387	13,726	98.01%	96.91%	94.29%
Black or African American alone (NH)	87	144	124	0.61%	0.97%	0.85%
Native American or Alaska Native alone (NH)	23	26	25	0.16%	0.17%	0.17%
Asian alone (NH)	15	19	41	0.10%	0.12%	0.28%
Pacific Islander alone (NH)	1	1	3	0.00%	0.00%	0.02%
Other race alone (NH)	2	4	17	0.01%	0.02%	0.11%
Mixed race or Multiracial (NH)	103	141	474	0.72%	0.94%	3.25%
Hispanic or Latino (any race)	52	123	146	0.36%	0.82%	1.00%
Total	14,261	14,845	14,556	100.00%	100.00%	100.00%

=== 2000 census ===
As of the 2000 census, there were 14,261 people, 5,660 households, and 4,097 families residing in the county. The population density was 33 people per square mile (13 people/km^{2}). There were 6,790 housing units at an average density of 16 units per square mile (6.2/km^{2}).

There were 5,660 households, out of which 31.70% had children under the age of 18 living with them, 59.50% were married couples living together, 8.20% had a female householder with no husband present, and 27.60% were non-families. 24.00% of all households were made up of individuals, and 10.60% had someone living alone who was 65 years of age or older. The average household size was 2.50 and the average family size was 2.95.

In the county, the population was spread out, with 24.60% under the age of 18, 7.60% from 18 to 24, 28.40% from 25 to 44, 25.00% from 45 to 64, and 14.50% who were 65 years of age or older. The median age was 38 years. For every 100 females there were 100.10 males. For every 100 females age 18 and over, there were 98.60 males.

Almost everyone who lives in Fulton County speaks English as their first language. The dominant form of speech in Fulton County is the Central Pennsylvania accent.

== Politics ==
United States presidential election results for Fulton County, Pennsylvania
Year	Republican		Democratic		Third party(ies)	
Year	No.	%	No.	%	No.	%
1888	951	42.93%	1,230	55.53%	34	1.53%
1892	918	42.74%	1,210	56.33%	20	0.93%
1896	1,083	45.83%	1,246	52.73%	34	1.44%
1900	1,039	45.27%	1,224	53.33%	32	1.39%
1904	1,100	48.48%	1,137	50.11%	32	1.41%
1908	974	45.45%	1,098	51.24%	71	3.31%
1912	317	15.34%	1,080	52.25%	670	32.41%
1916	802	39.62%	1,199	59.24%	23	1.14%
1920	1,292	50.19%	1,231	47.82%	51	1.98%
1924	1,160	47.64%	1,207	49.57%	68	2.79%
1928	2,179	66.82%	1,054	32.32%	28	0.86%
1932	1,410	41.83%	1,921	56.99%	40	1.19%
1936	2,085	46.02%	2,431	53.65%	15	0.33%
1940	2,108	51.46%	1,982	48.39%	6	0.15%
1944	2,084	54.03%	1,758	45.58%	15	0.39%
1948	1,760	50.65%	1,684	48.46%	31	0.89%
1952	2,127	55.12%	1,718	44.52%	14	0.36%
1956	2,370	56.50%	1,819	43.36%	6	0.14%
1960	2,698	61.61%	1,672	38.18%	9	0.21%
1964	1,747	44.37%	2,180	55.37%	10	0.25%
1968	2,200	55.37%	1,174	29.55%	599	15.08%
1972	2,515	66.24%	1,192	31.39%	90	2.37%
1976	2,219	54.76%	1,737	42.87%	96	2.37%
1980	2,740	64.90%	1,342	31.79%	140	3.32%
1984	3,254	71.14%	1,309	28.62%	11	0.24%
1988	3,086	66.42%	1,532	32.97%	28	0.60%
1992	2,558	50.93%	1,588	31.61%	877	17.46%
1996	2,665	54.75%	1,620	33.28%	583	11.98%
2000	3,753	71.01%	1,425	26.96%	107	2.02%
2004	4,772	76.10%	1,475	23.52%	24	0.38%
2008	4,642	73.61%	1,576	24.99%	88	1.40%
2012	4,814	77.38%	1,310	21.06%	97	1.56%
2016	5,694	83.47%	912	13.37%	216	3.17%
2020	6,824	85.41%	1,085	13.58%	81	1.01%
2024	7,039	86.03%	1,102	13.47%	41	0.50%

United States Senate election results for Fulton County, Pennsylvania1
Year	Republican		Democratic		Third party(ies)	
Year	No.	%	No.	%	No.	%
1994	2,498	62.59%	1,345	33.70%	148	3.71%
2000	3,761	72.94%	1,311	25.43%	84	1.63%
2006	2,673	61.14%	1,699	38.86%	0	0.00%
2012	4,407	71.81%	1,605	26.15%	125	2.04%
2018	4,173	78.68%	1,061	20.00%	70	1.32%
2024	6,773	83.45%	1,197	14.75%	146	1.80%

United States Senate election results for Fulton County, Pennsylvania3
Year	Republican		Democratic		Third party(ies)	
Year	No.	%	No.	%	No.	%
1992	2,786	56.43%	1,888	38.24%	263	5.33%
1998	2,238	68.55%	962	29.46%	65	1.99%
2004	4,349	72.76%	1,267	21.20%	361	6.04%
2010	3,434	76.81%	1,037	23.19%	0	0.00%
2016	5,456	81.06%	1,025	15.23%	250	3.71%
2022	5,171	82.79%	953	15.26%	122	1.95%

Pennsylvania Gubernatorial election results for Fulton County
Year	Republican		Democratic		Third party(ies)	
Year	No.	%	No.	%	No.	%
1970	1,783	48.31%	1,825	49.44%	83	2.25%
1974	1,576	49.10%	1,603	49.94%	31	0.97%
1978	1,827	55.31%	1,458	44.14%	18	0.54%
1982	1,794	50.34%	1,753	49.19%	17	0.48%
1986	1,794	52.23%	1,618	47.10%	23	0.67%
1990	1,173	37.69%	1,939	62.31%	0	0.00%
1994	2,319	58.03%	1,316	32.93%	361	9.03%
1998	2,210	66.25%	885	26.53%	241	7.22%
2002	2,681	69.42%	1,138	29.47%	43	1.11%
2006	2,669	61.51%	1,670	38.49%	0	0.00%
2010	3,521	78.84%	945	21.16%	0	0.00%
2014	2,650	70.46%	1,111	29.54%	0	0.00%
2018	4,202	79.34%	1,037	19.58%	57	1.08%
2022	5,092	80.99%	1,128	17.94%	67	1.07%

Although Fulton County traditionally voted Democratic in the 19th and early 20th centuries, and Democrats held the edge in voter registration in the county until the late 20th century, it has displayed strong tendencies to vote for Republican candidates since the New Deal era. In the 2004 United States presidential election, George W. Bush carried the county by a massive 52.6% margin over John Kerry, making it Bush's strongest county in the slightly Democratic state, which Kerry won by a 2.5% margin over Bush. In 2008, John McCain carried Fulton by a 48.6% margin over Barack Obama, McCain's best showing in Pennsylvania, which Obama won by a 10.3% margin over McCain. The county voted for Donald Trump in 2016 by a 70.8% margin, the highest in the state. The county has voted for the Republican in every presidential election since 1964. In 2006, Rick Santorum and Lynn Swann received more than 60% of the Fulton County vote despite their defeats statewide. In the 2012 election, Fulton County was the only county in Pennsylvania where Barack Obama won less than 25% of the white vote.

On the 2021 statewide ballot question which proposed an amendment to the Pennsylvania Constitution prohibiting discrimination based on race or ethnicity, Fulton County voted 47.05% in favor and 52.95% in opposition, making it one of two counties that voted against the measure which passed statewide.

=== Voter registration ===
As of February 5, 2024, there are 9,319 registered voters in the county. There are 6,851 registered Republicans, 1,523 registered Democrats, 674 voters registered non-affiliated voters, and 271 voters registered to other parties.

Chart of Voter Registration
1. Republican (73.5%)
2. Democratic (16.3%)
3. Independent (7.23%)
4. Other Parties (2.91%)

== Law and government ==
=== Law enforcement ===
As of 2016 all areas in the county use the Pennsylvania State Police (PSP) in a law enforcement capacity, either with part-time police departments or with no other police departments.

=== State Senate ===
- Judy Ward, Republican, Pennsylvania's 30th Senatorial District

=== State House of Representatives ===
- Jesse Topper, Republican, Pennsylvania's 78th Representative District

=== United States House of Representatives ===
- John Joyce, Republican, Pennsylvania's 13th congressional district

=== United States Senate ===
- John Fetterman, Democrat
- Dave McCormick, Republican

== Education ==
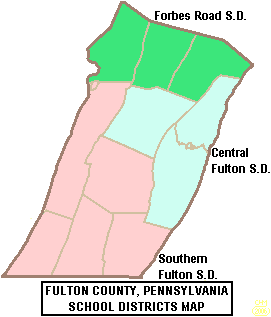
Map of Fulton County, Pennsylvania Public School Districts

There are three K-12 school districts:

- Central Fulton School District
- Forbes Road School District
- Southern Fulton School District

== Transportation ==
=== Major highways ===
- PA 16 - known as the Buchanan Trail, meets its western terminus in McConnellsburg; serves as a major two-lane through route across South-Central Pennsylvania, as it travels toward Waynesboro in Franklin County
- PA 26 - this long Central Pennsylvania main street sees its final two miles run through the rural corner of Union Township, as it departs a long Bedford County stretch, before reaching the Maryland border
- US 30 - a winding portion of the famous Lincoln Highway, the highway travels away from I-76, which parallels through most of the state's central mountains, to run across the county between the truck stop-lined Breezewood (East Providence Township) in Bedford County toward Franklin County's Chambersburg; although two-lane for its entire route, there is a limited access segment as the highway makes a short freeway bypass around McConnellsburg. the road serves as one of the county's two major arteries, largely oriented east/west, with its bypass intersecting US-522 just north of McConnellsburg.
- I-70 - just prior to entering the county, the route breaks from its consignment with I-76, and it travels due south through a rural swath of the western portion of the county, as it connects with I-68 just across the Maryland line, along its way to Baltimore
- I-76 / Penna Turnpike - a portion of the Pennsylvania Turnpike, this toll interstate has one exit as it crosses the northern portion of the county; the Sideling Hill travel center is located Taylor Township
- PA 475 - a relatively short and highly rural range highway, it meets its southern terminus in Dublin Township, as it travels north through sparsely populated portions of Huntingdon County
- PA 484 - this short highway runs entirely within the county, serving the purpose of connecting I-70 with PA 26, as it runs across Union and Bethel Townships
- US 522 - this route enters from Maryland to the south as part of a brief consignment with I-70, which it departs three miles into the county; the road serves as one of the county's two major arteries, largely oriented north–south, as it runs through McConnellsburg, past the county's only shopping center and through one of its only two stoplights, on its way to a junction with the Pennsylvania Turnpike in Dublin Township and toward Huntingdon County. it intersects with the US 30 bypass just north of McConnellsburg.
- PA 643 - just seven miles in length, this very short access route connects I-70 with the hills of Bethel and Brush Creek Townships
- PA 655 - this highway serves as a long, rural ridge route through the state's central mountains; its southern terminus is with the Maryland boundary in Thompson Township and it exits the county via Taylor Township toward Huntingdon County in the north
- PA 731 - one of the shortest numbered routes in Pennsylvania, this five mile road connects I-70 with Route 484, as it runs entirely through Union Township
- PA 913 - a very rural access route through Bedford and Huntingdon Counties, this road's final miles are in Wells and Taylor Township
- PA 915 - a mountain ridge cut-off-road, this highway travels from rural Bedford County along a valley setting toward its terminus with I-70 in Brush Creek Township
- PA 928 - a rural bi-state connector, this road travels from Ayr Township to the Maryland border via Thompson Township

=== Other ===
Fulton County is one of only two counties in Pennsylvania with no known active railroad lines of any kind, the other being Sullivan County. However, Fulton County was home to construction of the unfinished and abandoned South Pennsylvania Railroad, including finished tunnels, aqueducts, and deep cuts. There were also several temporary logging "railroads" that spanned the county as were commonplace in the area at the time.

== Communities ==
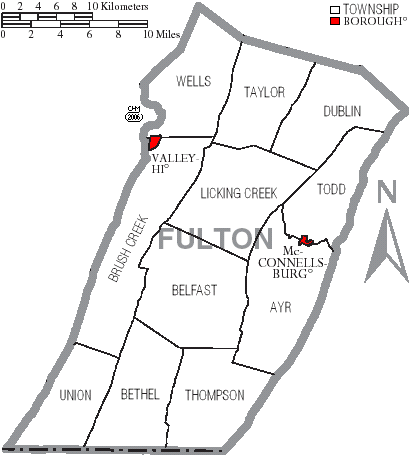
Map of Fulton County, Pennsylvania with Municipal Labels showing Boroughs (red) and Townships (white).

Under Pennsylvania law, there are four types of incorporated municipalities: cities, boroughs, townships, and, in at most two cases, towns. The following boroughs and townships are located in Fulton County:

=== Boroughs ===
- McConnellsburg (county seat)
- Valley-Hi

=== Townships ===
- Ayr Township
- Belfast Township
- Bethel Township
- Brush Creek Township
- Dublin Township
- Licking Creek Township
- Taylor Township
- Thompson Township
- Todd Township
- Union Township
- Wells Township

=== Census-designated place ===
- Needmore

=== Unincorporated communities ===
- Amaranth
- Big Cove Tannery
- Burnt Cabins
- Crystal Spring
- Dott
- Fort Littleton
- Harrisonville
- Hustontown
- Warfordsburg
- Waterfall
- Wells Tannery
- Wood

=== Population ranking ===
The population ranking of the following table is based on the 2010 census of Fulton County.

† county seat

Rank	City/Town/etc.	Municipal type	Population (2010 Census)
1	Belfast	Township	1,448
2	† McConnellsburg	Borough	1,220
3	Needmore	CDP	170
4	Valley-Hi	Borough	15

== See also ==
- National Register of Historic Places listings in Fulton County, Pennsylvania
