= Wells Township, Fulton County, Pennsylvania =

Township in Pennsylvania, United States

Coordinates: 40°05′17″N 78°09′44″W

Wells Township
- Township
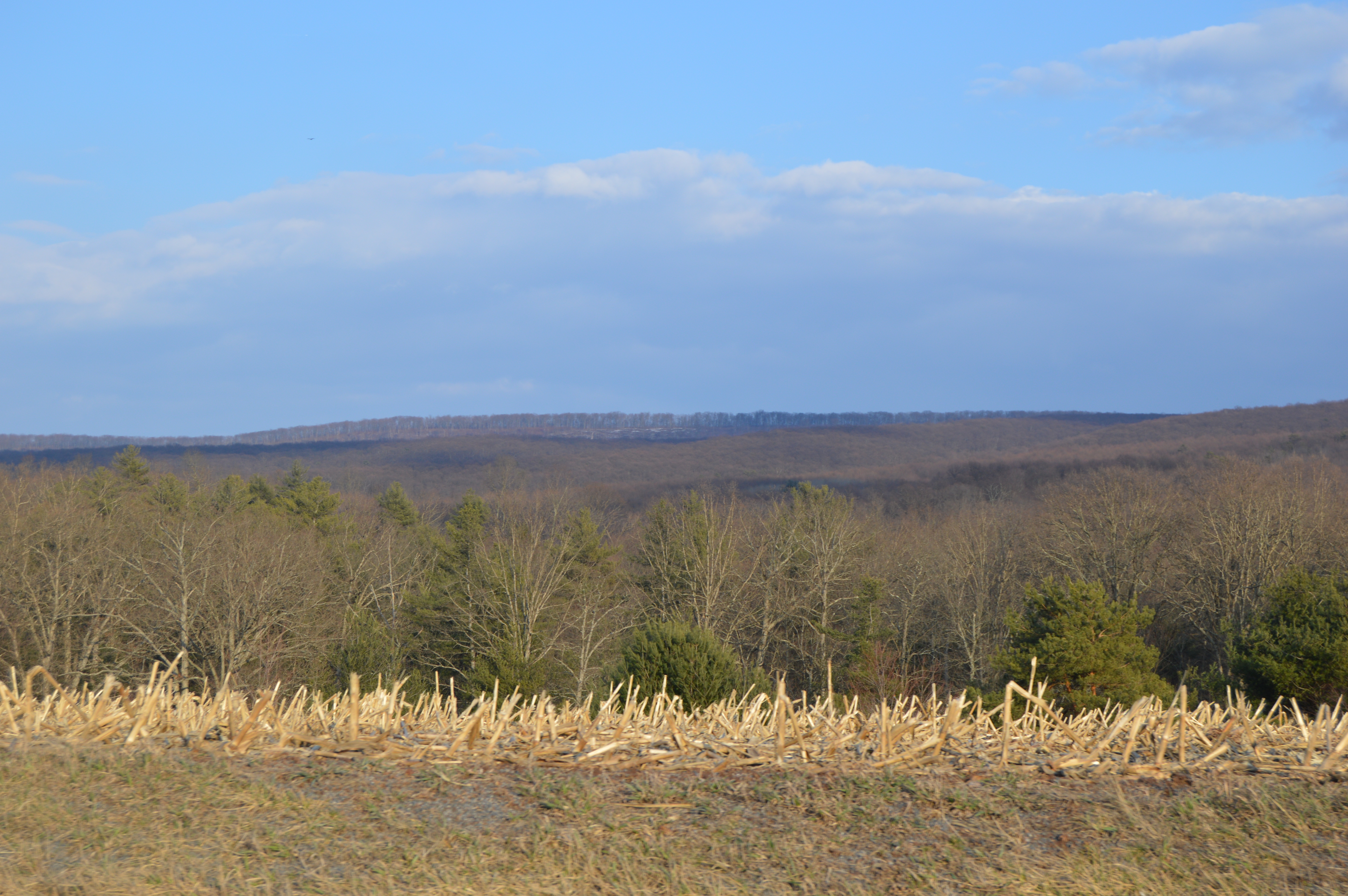
- Along Pennsylvania Route 915 in the township's south

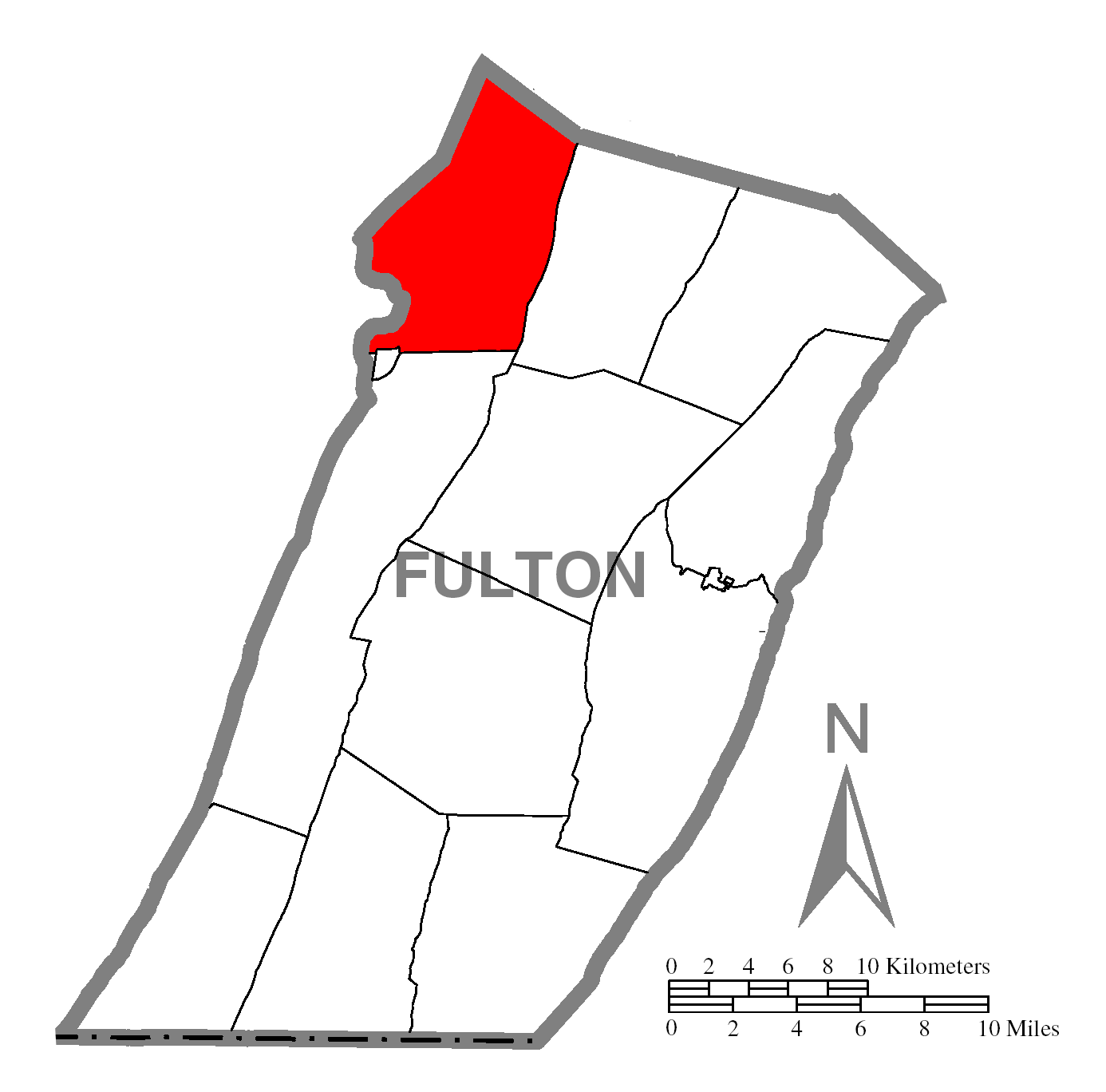
- Location of Wells Township in Fulton County

- Location of Fulton County in Pennsylvania
- Country: United States
- State: Pennsylvania
- County: Fulton County
- Established: 1760

Area
  - Total: 37.37 sq mi (96.79 km^{2})
  - Land: 37.37 sq mi (96.79 km^{2})
  - Water: 0 sq mi (0.00 km^{2})

Population (2020)
  - Total: 499 ▲
  - Estimate (2023): 488
  - Density: 12.3/sq mi (4.76/km^{2})
- Time zone: UTC-4 (EST)
  - Summer (DST): UTC-5 (EDT)
- FIPS code: 42-057-82152

Wells Township is a township in Fulton County, Pennsylvania, United States. The population was 499 at the 2020 census. Wells Township was initially settled in 1760. It was originally known as Aughwick Township when it was incorporated in 1849. The name was changed to Wells Township on April 2, 1850.

== History ==
The Woodvale Historic District was listed on the National Register of Historic Places in 1992. George Croghan moved to the area in 1753 and built a home, partly to escape creditors after suffering severe losses to his business as a trader in Ohio and Kentucky.

== Geography ==
According to the United States Census Bureau, the township has a total area of 37.4 square miles (96.8 km^{2}), all land.

Wells Township is located in the northwestern corner of Fulton County, extending to the Broad Top plateau in the extreme northwestern corner.

== Demographics ==
Historical population
Census	Pop.	Note	%±
2000	529		—
2010	477		−9.8%
2020	499		4.6%
2023 (est.)	488		−2.2%
U.S. Decennial Census

As of the census of 2000, there were 529 people, 221 households, and 148 families residing in the township. The population density was 14.2 people per square mile (5.5/km^{2}). There were 275 housing units at an average density of 7.4/sq mi (2.8/km^{2}). The racial makeup of the township was 98.49% White, 0.19% Native American, and 1.32% from two or more races.

There were 221 households, out of which 28.5% had children under the age of 18 living with them, 60.2% were married couples living together, 3.6% had a female householder with no husband present, and 33.0% were non-families. 29.9% of all households were made up of individuals, and 15.8% had someone living alone who was 65 years of age or older. The average household size was 2.39 and the average family size was 3.00.

In the township the population was spread out, with 24.0% under the age of 18, 4.7% from 18 to 24, 27.0% from 25 to 44, 24.2% from 45 to 64, and 20.0% who were 65 years of age or older. The median age was 42 years. For every 100 females there were 98.9 males. For every 100 females age 18 and over, there were 101.0 males.

The median income for a household in the township was $27,917, and the median income for a family was $31,806. Males had a median income of $30,313 versus $18,750 for females. The per capita income for the township was $13,746. About 9.2% of families and 17.5% of the population were below the poverty line, including 31.1% of those under age 18 and 8.2% of those age 65 or over.
