= Brush Creek Township, Pennsylvania =

Township in Pennsylvania, United States

Coordinates: 39°57′30″N 78°12′59″W

Brush Creek Township
- Township
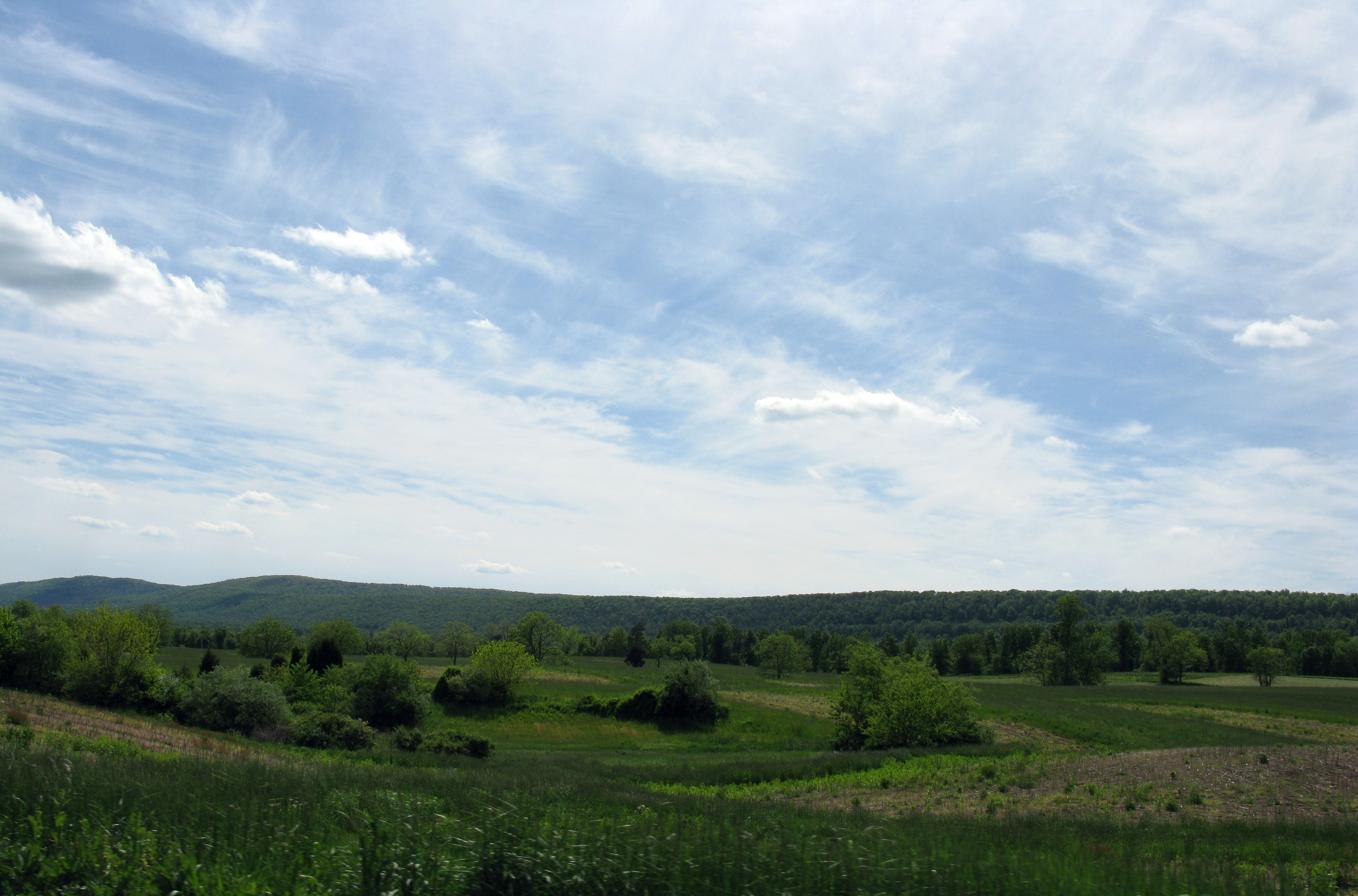
- A farm in Brush Creek Township

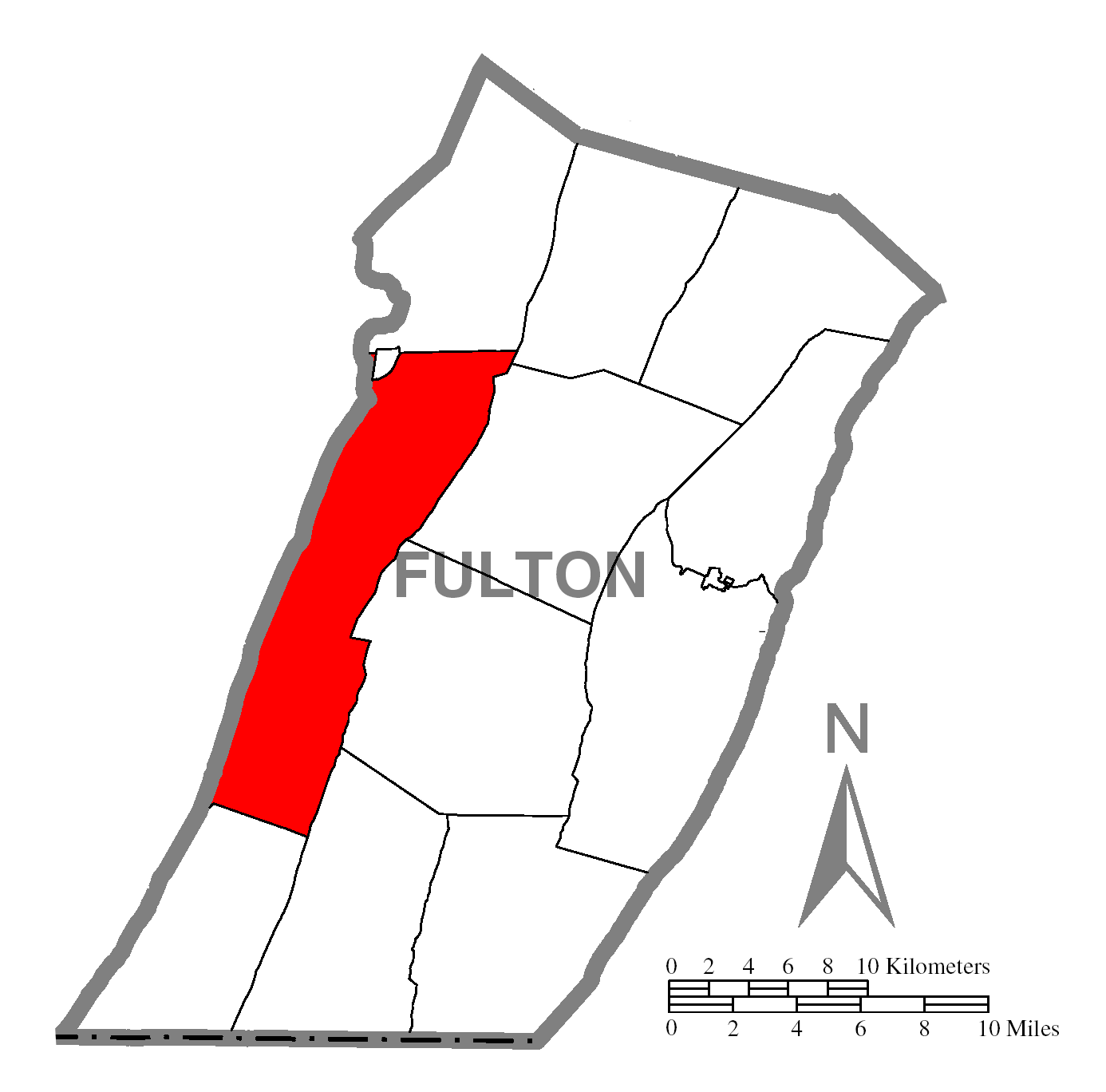
- Location of Brush Creek Township in Fulton County

- Location of Fulton County in Pennsylvania
- Country: United States
- State: Pennsylvania
- County: Fulton County
- Established: 1790

Area
  - Total: 54.29 sq mi (140.61 km^{2})
  - Land: 54.29 sq mi (140.61 km^{2})
  - Water: 0 sq mi (0.00 km^{2})

Population (2020)
  - Total: 736 ▼
  - Estimate (2023): 725
  - Density: 14.6/sq mi (5.65/km^{2})
- Time zone: UTC-4 (EST)
  - Summer (DST): UTC-5 (EDT)
- FIPS code: 42-057-09568

Brush Creek Township is a township in Fulton County, Pennsylvania, United States. The population was 736 at the 2020 census.

== Geography ==
According to the United States Census Bureau, the township has a total area of 54.3 square miles (141 km^{2}), all land.

== Demographics ==
Historical population
Census	Pop.	Note	%±
2000	730		—
2010	819		12.2%
2020	736		−10.1%
2023 (est.)	725		−1.5%
U.S. Decennial Census

As of the census of 2000, there were 730 people, 283 households, and 213 families residing in the township. The population density was 13.4 people per square mile (5.2/km^{2}). There were 394 housing units at an average density of 7.3/sq mi (2.8/km^{2}). The racial makeup of the township was 98.22% White, 0.14% Native American, and 1.64% from two or more races. Hispanic or Latino of any race were 0.96% of the population.

There were 283 households, out of which 33.2% had children under the age of 18 living with them, 58.7% were married couples living together, 9.9% had a female householder with no husband present, and 24.4% were non-families. 22.6% of all households were made up of individuals, and 9.2% had someone living alone who was 65 years of age or older. The average household size was 2.54 and the average family size was 2.94.

In the township the population was spread out, with 24.7% under the age of 18, 8.4% from 18 to 24, 26.3% from 25 to 44, 24.4% from 45 to 64, and 16.3% who were 65 years of age or older. The median age was 39 years. For every 100 females, there were 100.0 males. For every 100 females age 18 and over, there were 102.2 males.

The median income for a household in the township was $31,827, and the median income for a family was $35,625. Males had a median income of $26,953 versus $16,750 for females. The per capita income for the township was $13,643. About 14.6% of families and 15.6% of the population were below the poverty line, including 21.2% of those under age 18 and 12.6% of those age 65 or over.
