= National Register of Historic Places listings in Fulton County, Pennsylvania =

Location of Fulton County in Pennsylvania

This is a list of the National Register of Historic Places listings in Fulton County, Pennsylvania.

This is intended to be a complete list of the properties and districts on the National Register of Historic Places in Fulton County, Pennsylvania, United States. The locations of National Register properties and districts for which the latitude and longitude coordinates are included below, may be seen in a map.

There are 8 properties and districts listed on the National Register in the county.

This National Park Service list is complete through NPS recent listings posted December 12, 2025.

== Current listings ==
	Name on the Register	Image	Date listed	Location	City or town	Description
1	Burnt Cabins Gristmill Property	Burnt Cabins Gristmill Property	November 28, 1980 (#80003502)	Allen's Valley Road; 40°04′36″N 77°53′13″W	Dublin Township	
2	Burnt Cabins Historic District	Burnt Cabins Historic District	May 20, 1998 (#98000566)	Legislative Route 23905 and U.S. Route 522; 40°04′44″N 77°53′43″W	Dublin Township	
3	Cold Spring Farm	Cold Spring Farm	August 10, 2000 (#00000966)	323 Lions Park Drive near McConnellsburg; 39°56′07″N 77°59′24″W	Todd Township	
4	Cowans Gap State Park Family Cabin District		February 11, 1987 (#87000051)	18 miles (29 km) north of Pennsylvania Route 75 and Chambersburg on Richmond Road; 39°59′22″N 77°55′50″W	Todd Township	
5	Fulton House	Fulton House	July 20, 1977 (#77001169)	112–116 Lincoln Way East; 39°55′56″N 77°59′55″W	McConnellsburg	
6	McConnell House	McConnell House	November 21, 1976 (#76001642)	114 Lincoln Way; 39°55′58″N 77°59′59″W	McConnellsburg	
7	McConnellsburg Historic District	McConnellsburg Historic District	August 9, 1993 (#93000727)	Roughly along Lincoln Way from 1st Street to 5th Avenue and 2nd Street from Spruce Street to Maple Street; 39°55′56″N 77°59′57″W	McConnellsburg	
8	Woodvale Historic District	Woodvale Historic District	July 24, 1992 (#92000942)	Roughly bounded by Ash, High, North, Fulton, and Broad Streets in Woodvale; 40°10′01″N 78°08′17″W	Wells Township	Extends into Broad Top Township in Bedford County and Wood Township in Huntingdon County

== See also ==
- List of National Historic Landmarks in Pennsylvania
- National Register of Historic Places listings in Pennsylvania
- List of Pennsylvania state historical markers in Fulton County
