= Big Cove Creek =

Creek in Pennsylvania, United States

Coordinates: 39.82000°N 78.06442°W

Big Cove Creek is a 19.9-mile-long (32.0 km) tributary of Licking Creek in Fulton County, Pennsylvania, in the United States.

== Background ==
Big Cove Creek rises on the west side of Cove Mountain, just outside the Buchanan State Forest. It flows southward in the valley between Cove Mountain and Little Scrub Ridge and Scrub Ridge, generally paralleling U.S. Route 522. About four miles south of its source, it passes through McConnellsburg, the only town of note along its course. About five miles to the south, the creek swings westward and cuts the gap along the south side of Strawberry Ridge, meeting Back Run. It now flows in a narrow valley between Scrub Ridge and the northern outliers of Dickeys Mountain, and is fed by Roaring Run and Spring Run. At the hamlet of Big Cove Tannery, Route 522 swings away to cross Scrub Ridge, and Pennsylvania Route 928 follows the creek south. Just below, Esther Run cuts a deep gap between Dickeys Mountain and Lowery Knob to enter it from the east. It passes through an outlying parcel of Buchanan State Forest, then hugs the west side of the valley while Route 928 climbs away on the east side. It finally joins Licking Creek north of the town of Dickeys Mountain.

In 2017, the Pennsylvania Fish and Boat Commission announced that a part of Big Cove Creek near Big Cove Tannery in Fulton County, had been selected as one of 14 Keystone Select Stocked Trout Waters to be stocked with 14- to 20-inch trout.

== Tributaries ==
- Esther Run
- Spring Run
- Roaring Run
- Back Run
- Kendall Run

== See also ==
- List of rivers of Pennsylvania
