= Central Fulton School District =

School district in Pennsylvania

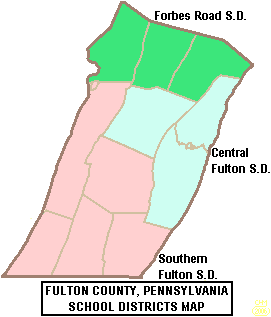

Address
- 151 East Cherry Street McConnellsburg, Pennsylvania, 17233; United States

District information
- Type: Public

Students and staff
- District mascot: Spartans
- Colors: Blue and white

Other information
- Website: www.cfsd.info

The Central Fulton School District covers the Borough of McConnellsburg and Ayr Township, Licking Creek Township and Todd Township in Fulton County, Pennsylvania. It encompasses approximately 135 square miles (350 km^{2}). According to 2000 federal census data, it serves a resident population of 6,075.

== Schools ==
- McConnellsburg Elementary School Grades K–5
- McConnellsburg Middle School Grades 6–8
- McConnellsburg High School Grades 9–12

== Extracurriculars ==
The district's students have access to a variety of clubs, activities and sports.

=== Athletics ===
- Baseball - Class A
- Basketball - Class A
- Soccer - Class A/AA
- Softball - Class A
- Track and field - Class AA
- Volleyball - Class A
