= Big Cove Tannery, Pennsylvania =

Unincorporated community in Pennsylvania, US

- Unincorporated community
- Location within Pennsylvania
- Coordinates: 39°50′56″N 78°02′58″W
- Country: United States
- State: Pennsylvania
- County: Fulton
- Elevation: 666 ft (203 m)
- Time zone: UTC-5 (Eastern (EST))
  - Summer (DST): UTC-4 (EDT)
- ZIP code: 17212
- Area codes: 223 & 717
- GNIS feature ID: 1169492

Big Cove Tannery is an unincorporated community in Fulton County, Pennsylvania, United States. The community is located along Pennsylvania Route 928, 6.4 miles (10.3 km) south-southwest of McConnellsburg.

== History ==
In 2017, the Pennsylvania Fish and Boat Commission announced that a part of Big Cove Creek near Big Cove Tannery in Fulton County, had been selected as one of 14 Keystone Select Stocked Trout Waters to be stocked with 14- to 20-inch trout.
