= Todd Township, Pennsylvania =

Todd Township is the name of some places in the U.S. state of Pennsylvania:

- Todd Township, Fulton County, Pennsylvania
- Todd Township, Huntingdon County, Pennsylvania
