= WEEO =

WEEO may refer to:

- WEEO-FM, a radio station (103.7 FM) licensed to serve McConnellsburg, Pennsylvania, United States
- WRDD, a radio station (1480 AM) licensed to serve Shippensburg, Pennsylvania, which held the call sign WEEO from 2000 to 2021
