= Aughwick =

Aughwick may refer to the following places in the U.S. state of Pennsylvania:

Streams:

- Aughwick Creek, a tributary of the Juniata River
  - Little Aughwick Creek, a tributary of Aughwick Creek

Communities:

- Wells Township, Fulton County, Pennsylvania, formerly known as Aughwick Township
