= Pennsylvania Route 928 =

State highway in Fulton County, Pennsylvania, US

Pennsylvania Route 928

Route information
- Maintained by PennDOT
- Length: 11.42 mi (18.38 km)
- Existed: 1928–present

Major junctions
- South end: Tollgate Ridge Road at the Maryland state line
- North end: US 522 in Ayr Township

Location
- Country: United States
- State: Pennsylvania
- Counties: Fulton

Highway system
- Pennsylvania State Route System; Interstate; US; State; Scenic; Legislative
← PA 927	→ PA 929

Pennsylvania Route 928 (PA 928) is a 11.42-mile-long (18.38 km) state highway located in Fulton County, Pennsylvania. The southern terminus is the Maryland state line in Thompson Township. The northern terminus is at U.S. Route 522 (US 522) in Ayr Township.

== Route description ==
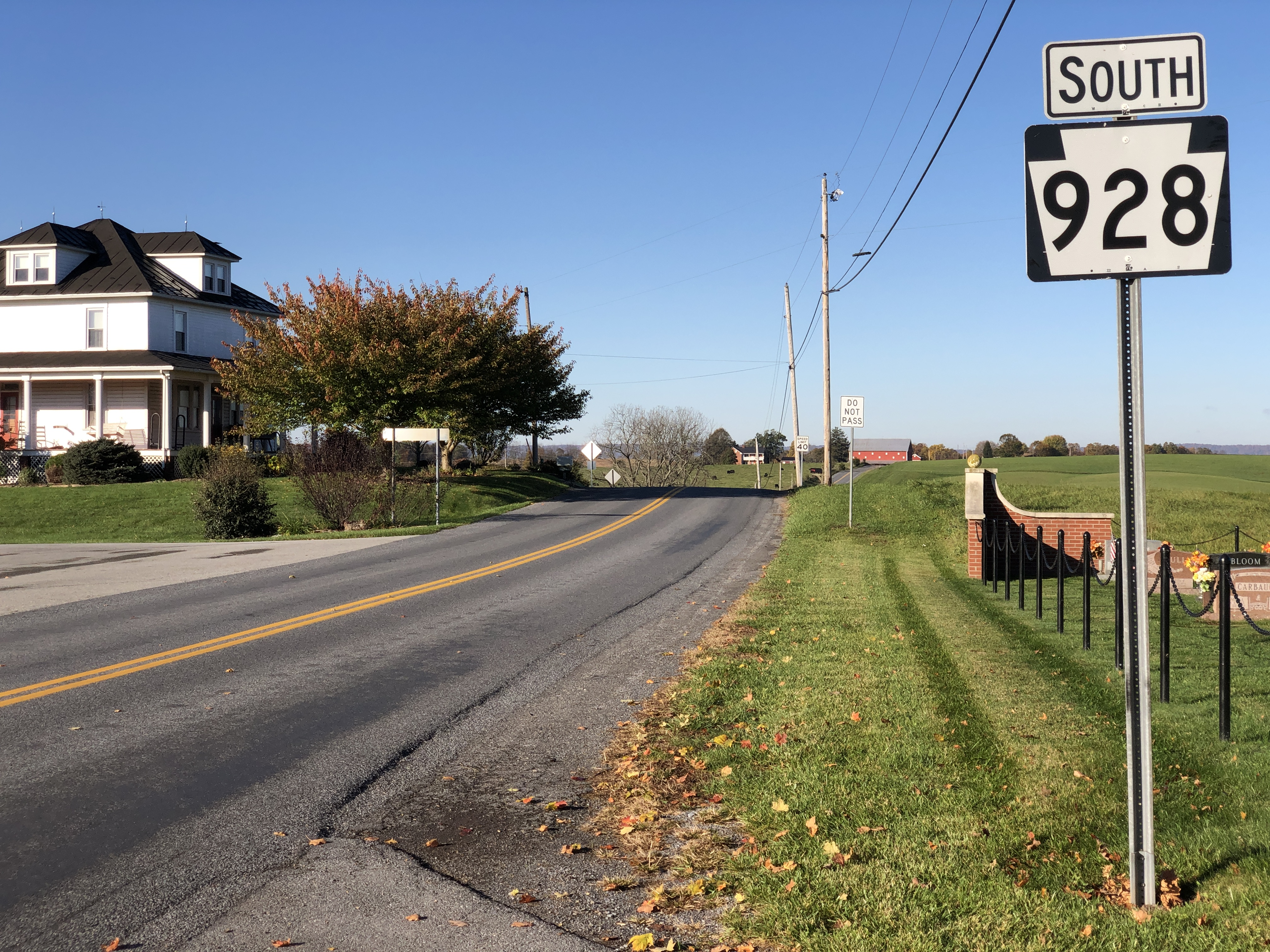
PA 928 southbound in Thompson Township

PA 928 begins at the Maryland border in Thompson Township, where the road continues south into that state as Tollgate Ridge Road. From the state line, the route heads northeast on two-lane undivided Tollgate Ridge Road, running through agricultural areas with sparse homes. PA 928 turns east onto Big Cove Tannery Road, making a curve to the northeast. The road continues through more farmland with some woods and residences, crossing the Licking Creek and passing through the community of Dickeys Mountain. Farther northeast, the route heads into more forested areas, running along the western base of Dickeys Mountain. PA 928 crosses into Ayr Township and continues through more woodland with some farm fields and residences, passing through Potts Mills. Farther north, the route crosses Cove Creek and passes through Big Cove Tannery before reaching its northern terminus at US 522.

== Major intersections ==
The entire route is in Fulton County.

Location	mi	km	Destinations	Notes
Thompson Township	0.00	0.00	Tollgate Ridge Road	Continuation into Maryland
Ayr Township	11.42	18.38	US 522 (Great Cove Road) – Warfordsburg, McConnellsburg	Northern terminus
1.000 mi = 1.609 km; 1.000 km = 0.621 mi
