= List of Pennsylvania state historical markers in Fulton County =

Location of Fulton County in Pennsylvania

This is a list of the Pennsylvania state historical markers in Fulton County.

This is intended to be a complete list of the official state historical markers placed in Fulton County, Pennsylvania by the Pennsylvania Historical and Museum Commission (PHMC). The locations of the historical markers, as well as the latitude and longitude coordinates as provided by the PHMC's database, are included below when available. There are 11 historical markers located in Fulton County.

== Historical markers ==
Marker title	Image	Date dedicated	Location	Marker type	Topics
Big Spring Graveyard		November 6, 1989	U.S. 522, 2.8 miles S of McConnellsburg; 38.89005°N 78.01648°W	Roadside	Native American
Burnt Cabins		June 4, 1947	U.S. 522, .2 mile S of Burnt Cabins, county line 40.07735°N 77.90252°W	Roadside	Native American
Confederate Dead		February 10, 1948	Pa. 16, .4 mile SE of McConnellsburg; 39.92402°N 77.98381°W	City	Civil War, Military
Forbes Road (Raystown Path)		February 21, 1952	U.S. 522, .2 mile SW of Burnt Cabins; 40.07744°N 77.90175°W	Roadside	French & Indian War, Military, Transportation
Fort Littleton - PLAQUE		July 1, 1924	US 522, 1.2 mile from intersection at Fort Littleton; 40.06339°N 77.96109°W	Plaque	Forts, French & Indian War, Governors, Military
Fort Lyttleton		June 30, 1967	U.S. 522 at Fort; 40.06341°N 77.96097°W (Missing)	Roadside	Forts, French & Indian War, Military
Fulton County		December 5, 1982	County Courthouse, N. 2nd (U.S. 522) & Market Sts., McConnellsburg; 39.93399°N 77.99852°W	City	Government & Politics, Government & Politics 19th Century
Gettysburg campaign		October 23, 1947	Near intersection of Lincoln Way East and Horton St., at E end of McConnellsburg; 39.92884°N 77.98458°W	Roadside	Civil War, Military
Hunter Mill		October 23, 1947	U.S. 522, 5.3 miles S of McConnellsburg at Webster Mills; 39.85966°N 78.03592°W	Roadside	Buildings, Business & Industry, Mills
Last Confederate Bivouac		June 4, 1947	US 522, .6 mile S of McConnellsburg; 39.9205°N 78.00637°W	Roadside	Civil War, Military
Last Confederate Bivouac - PLAQUE		July 1, 1930	US 522, 1 mile S of McConnellsburg; 39.92059°N 78.00635°W	Plaque	Civil War, Military

== See also ==
- List of Pennsylvania state historical markers
- National Register of Historic Places listings in Fulton County, Pennsylvania
