= Cowans Gap State Park =

State park in Pennsylvania, United States

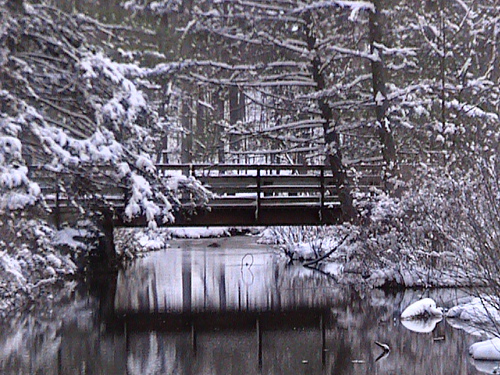
- A snow-covered bridge at Cowans Gap State Park

- Location within Pennsylvania Location within the United States
- Interactive map of Cowans Gap State Park
- Location: Fulton and Franklin counties, Pennsylvania, United States
- Coordinates: 39°59′41″N 77°55′30″W
- Area: 1,085 acres (439 ha)
- Elevation: 1,204 feet (367 m)
- Established: 1937
- Administrator: Pennsylvania Department of Conservation and Natural Resources
- Named for: John and Mary Cowan
- Website: Official website
- Pennsylvania State Parks

Cowans Gap State Park is a 1,085-acre (439 ha) Pennsylvania state park in Todd Township, Fulton County and Metal Township, Franklin County, Pennsylvania in the United States. The park is largely surrounded by Buchanan State Forest in Allens Valley just off Pennsylvania Route 75 near Fort Loudon.

== History ==
=== French and Indian War ===
The history of Cowans Gap State Park stretches back to the French and Indian War. At the time the Cowans Gap was on the western frontier of the Thirteen Colonies. The land to the west was held by the French and their Native American allies the Algonquians and Huron. The French and British fought for control of the Ohio River Valley, including the area surrounding Pittsburgh. British Major General Edward Braddock led an expedition through southwestern Pennsylvania in 1755. His men built Braddock's Road from Cumberland, Maryland to present-day North Braddock. At the same time, Braddock's subordinate, Colonel James Burd was building Burd's Road from Shippensburg to connect with Braddock's Road. Burd's road, built as a supply line, passed through Cowans Gap but was never completed due to Braddock's defeat at the Monongahela. The road ended just past Berlin. The British again tried to gain control of the Ohio River Valley in 1758, this time under the leadership of General John Forbes, whose second-in-command was Lieutenant Colonel Henry Bouquet (Forbes' aide was Colonel George Washington). They picked up where Burd's Road left off, built the Forbes Road and ultimately drove the French and their Indian allies out of Western Pennsylvania. Colonel Bouquet used the Forbes Road one more time in 1763 to break the siege of Fort Pitt during Pontiac's Rebellion.

=== The Cowan Homestead ===
Cowans Gap is named for John and Mary Cowan, who settled there just after the American Revolution. The Cowans met in Boston in 1775. John Samuel Cowan was from a Loyalist family and Mary Mueller was from a Patriot family. Cowan reached the rank of Major in the British Army during the war, and returned to Boston at the conclusion of the war to ask for Mary's hand in marriage. The Mueller family forbade the marriage and John and Mary eloped. At first they settled in Chambersburg, where they lived for a few years before heading out for Kentucky. Their wagon was disabled while crossing Conococheague Creek near Fort Loudoun, so John Cowan traded his horses and broken wagon to a Tuscarora chief for the land that is now known at Cowans Gap. Cowan received a smoking pipe and tomahawk rights, which entailed marking a large chestnut tree on his property with three slashes, as a sign of peace with the Tuscarora. John Cowan secured a deed for the land from the Commonwealth of Pennsylvania in 1785. The Cowans built their home along Forbes Road near the present day intersection of Aughwick Road and Stumpy Lane.

=== Deforestation ===
The old-growth forests in and surrounding Cowans Gap State Park were clear cut during the late 18th and early 19th centuries to meet the need for charcoal at nearby Mount Pleasant iron furnace. Colliers harvested the stands of white pine, hemlock, and hardwoods, and made charcoal by stacking timber around large hearths. The hearths were fired by the collier, who tended them for 10 to 14 days until the charcoal was ready. The forests regrew until 1865 when another iron furnace, Richmond Furnace, was built. Once again the timber was harvested and turned into charcoal. The Richmond Furnace was in operation until 1885. The trees that were not cut down for charcoal were ultimately felled by a lumbering operation owned by Harrison Kalbach of Lebanon. He bought 4,800 acres (1,900 ha) of woodland that was stripped of all its trees by 1907. The land was left largely barren, covered mostly with dried out tree tops that were burnt to ashes in massive wild fires that were set off by sparks from passing steam locomotives. An immense reforestation effort, led by the young men of the Civilian Conservation Corps, began in earnest during the Great Depression.

=== Civilian Conservation Corps ===
The Civilian Conservation Corps created by President Franklin D. Roosevelt during the Great Depression, provided work for the unemployed from throughout the United States. A CCC camp, Richmond Furnace Camp PA-SP-54, was built at the site of Cowans Gap State Park. At first the young men lived in tents, but they soon built cabins (which are still in use at the park). The young men of the CCC also planted thousands of acres of new trees, built four bridges, 30 miles (48 km) of state roads, 32 miles (51 km) of fire trails, and 11 miles (18 km) of telephone lines. In addition, the CCC also cleared the forests and streams of brush, built pavilions, and constructed the dam that created Cowans Gap Lake. The park opened to the public in 1937.

== Recreation ==
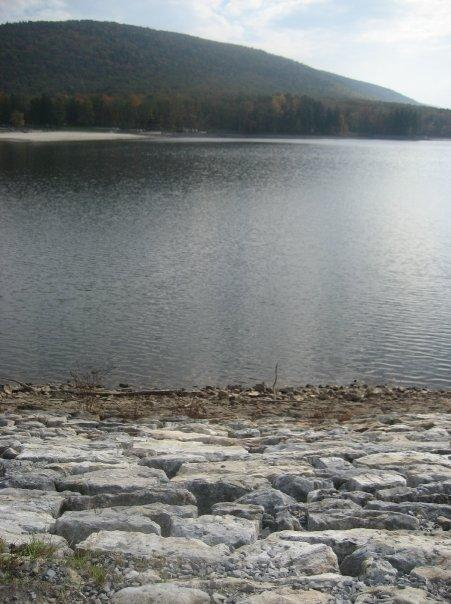
View of the lake from the dam

Cowans Gap State Park is open for year-round recreation. It has extensive picnic facilities that surround much of Cowans Gap Lake. The park is also open to hiking, cross country skiing, hunting, fishing, ice fishing, ice skating, and boating.

=== Trails ===
Cowans Gap State Park has 13 miles (21 km) of trails open year-round to hiking and in some places cross-country skiing.

- Cameron Trail (0.5 miles (800 m)) is a "difficult" trail on the southern boundary of the park that ends atop Cove Mountain.
- Geyer Trail (0.5 miles (800 m)) is a "difficult" trail. It begins at Aughwick Road near the dam on Cowans Gap Lake and ascends Tuscarora Mountain, passing through patches of mountain laurel before it connects with Tuscarora Trail.
- Logging Road Trail (1.7 miles (2.7 km)) is an "easy" trail. This trail passes around the base of Cove Mountain and connects with many of the other trails in the park. Logging Road Trail is especially popular with cross country skiers and can be reached from Parking Lot #7 by using Ski Trail.
- Horseshoe Trail (0.6 miles (970 m)) is a "very difficult" trail. This trail is very steep and is for experienced hikers only. Horseshoe Trail passes over loose stone on steep slopes as it ascends Cove Mountain and ends at Knobsville Road Trail.
- Knobsville Road Trail (1.3 miles (2.1 km)) is a "moderate" trail. It follows an old road constructed by the Civilian Conservation Corps and also ascends Cove Mountain. It passes by a landslide exhibit, an old incinerator that was built and used by the CCC, and provides access to the park overlook. The trail intersects with Horseshoe Trail before it ends in Buchanan State Forest.
- One Mile Trail is not one mile (1.6 km), but rather only a 0.4-mile (640 m) "easy" trail. One Mile Trail gets its name because it is one mile (1.6 km) from Parking Lot #3 on Aughwick Road.
- Plessinger Trail (1.1 miles (1.8 km)) is a "moderate" difficulty trail. Is a rocky trail that follows the banks of Little Aughwick Creek, providing excellent access to the creek for fishermen.
- Ski Trail (0.2 miles (320 m)) is an "easy" spur trail that connects Parking Lot #7 with Logging Road Trail.
- Three Mile Trail is 1.1 miles (1.8 km) long, not three miles (5 km); it is a "moderate" trail. It is three miles (5 km) down Aughwick Road from Parking Lot #3. Three Mile Trail passes through patches of mountain laurel along the side of Tuscarora Mountain.
- Tuscarora Trail is a spur trail to the Appalachian Trail. It passes through Cowans Gap State Park for 2 miles (3.2 km).
- Forbes Trail is a backpacking trail that passes through much of southern Pennsylvania. The trailheads are near Carlisle in the east and Pittsburgh in the west. Forbes Trail passes through Cowans Gap State Park, but is not primarily used by park visitors, but rather by backpackers who are passing through.

=== Cowans Gap Lake ===
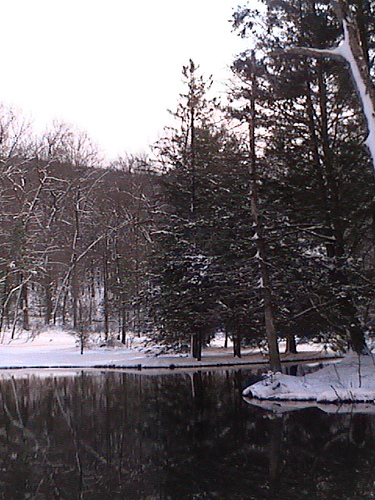
Cowans Gap Lake in the winter

Cowans Gap Lake (42 acres (17 ha)) was created by the Civilian Conservation Corps during the Great Depression by damming Little Aughwick Creek. The lake is open for recreational fishing, swimming and boating, as well as ice skating and ice fishing at Cowans Gap State Park. Visitors are asked to use caution in winter as the thickness of the ice is not monitored by the park staff (except in the ice skating area located near the beach).

Fishermen visit the lake in pursuit of trout, bass, panfish and perch. Little Aughwick Creek is a trout fishery. All anglers are expected to follow the rules and regulations of the Pennsylvania Fish and Boat Commission.

Beginning in 2008 lifeguards will not be posted at the beach. The beach is open from 11:00 am until 7:00 pm. A food concession at the beach sells pizza, funnel cake, french fries, soft serve ice cream, soft drinks and many other snacks.

Gas powered boats are prohibited on Cowans Gap Lake. Electric powered and non-powered boats must have a current registration with any state. A concession at the lake is open during the summer months for the renting of row and paddle boats.

=== Hunting ===
There are about 630 acres (250 ha) of woods open to hunting at Cowans Gap State Park. Hunters are expected to follow the rules and regulations of the Pennsylvania Game Commission. The common game species are squirrels, white-tailed deer, and turkeys. The hunting of groundhogs is prohibited. Hunters may access the adjoining Buchanan State Forest by using the parking lots at Cowans Gap State Park and hiking in on the trails.

== Staying overnight ==
=== Camping ===
The campground at Cowans Gap State Park opens in mid April at the beginning of trout season and closes in mid December at the conclusion of deer season. The campground has 224 sites, in two areas, that have enough room for any camping equipment from a tent to a large RV. The area has modern restrooms with flush toilets and hot showers. A large area within the campground is reserved for large group camping such as the Boy Scouts.

=== Cabins ===
There are 10 rustic cabins built during the Great Depression by the CCC. These cabins have three rooms with a four-person overnight capacity. They are equipped with a refrigerator, stove, fireplace and two bunk beds, but no indoor plumbing. A centrally located modern restroom with hot showers is nearby.
