= Toby Shaw =

American television news producer

Toby Shaw is an American television news producer.

== Early life and education ==
Shaw was born in McConnellsburg, Pennsylvania.

== Career ==
Shaw is a four time Emmy award-winning news producer and is managing editor for KIVI-TV in Boise, Idaho.

Shaw served as the Idaho Regional Chair for the Northwest chapter of the National Academy of Television Arts and Sciences between 2018 and 2022.

== Personal life ==
Shaw is married to Brenda Leap.

== Awards ==
- 2007: Northwest Region Emmy Award, Evening News (Markets 81+)
- 2008: Northwest Region Emmy Award, Evening News (Markets 81+)
- 2009: Northwest Region Emmy Award, Evening News (Markets 81+)
