= Dublin Township, Fulton County, Pennsylvania =

Township in Pennsylvania, United States

Coordinates: 40°03′30″N 77°52′28″W

Dublin Township
- Township
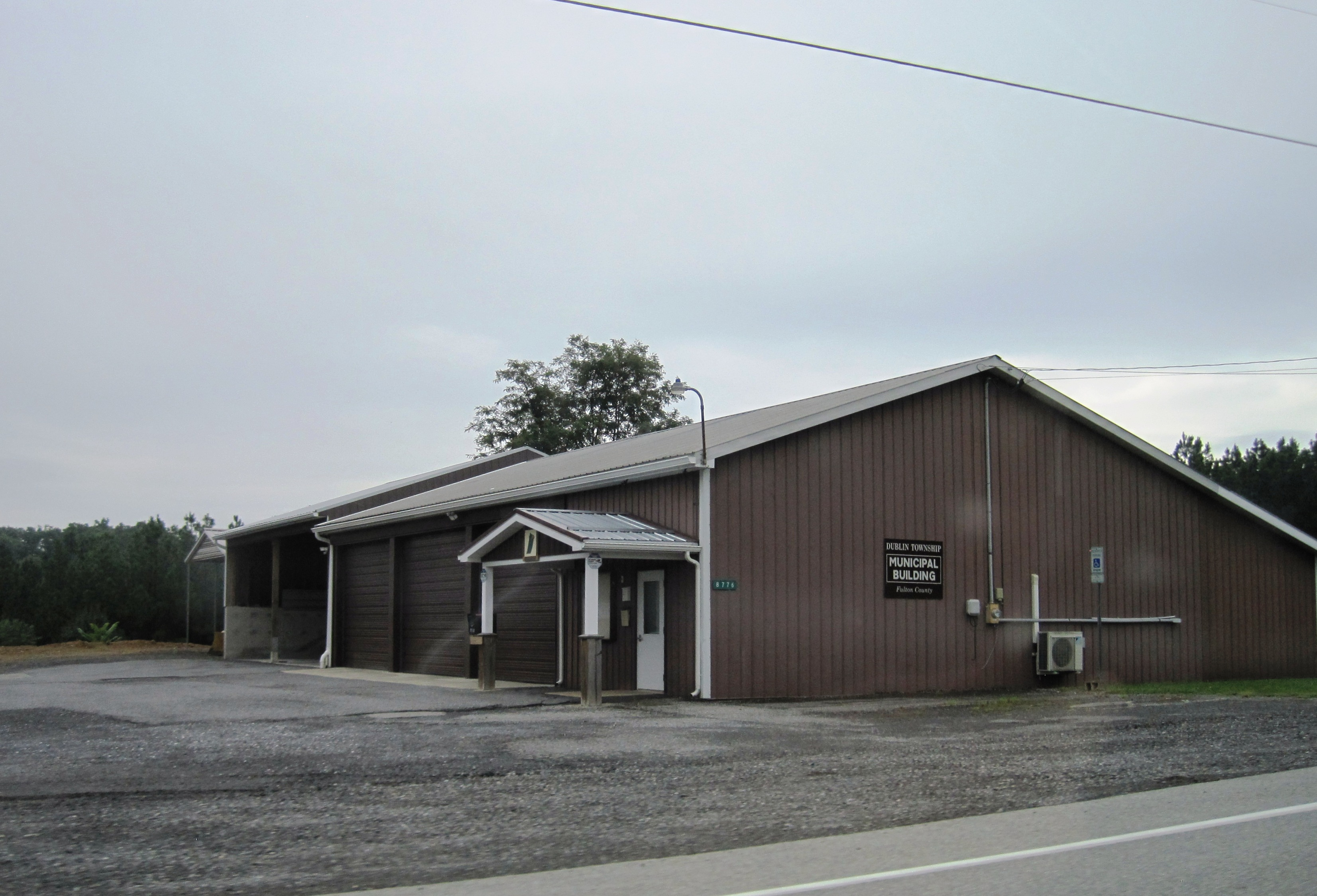
- Township municipal building

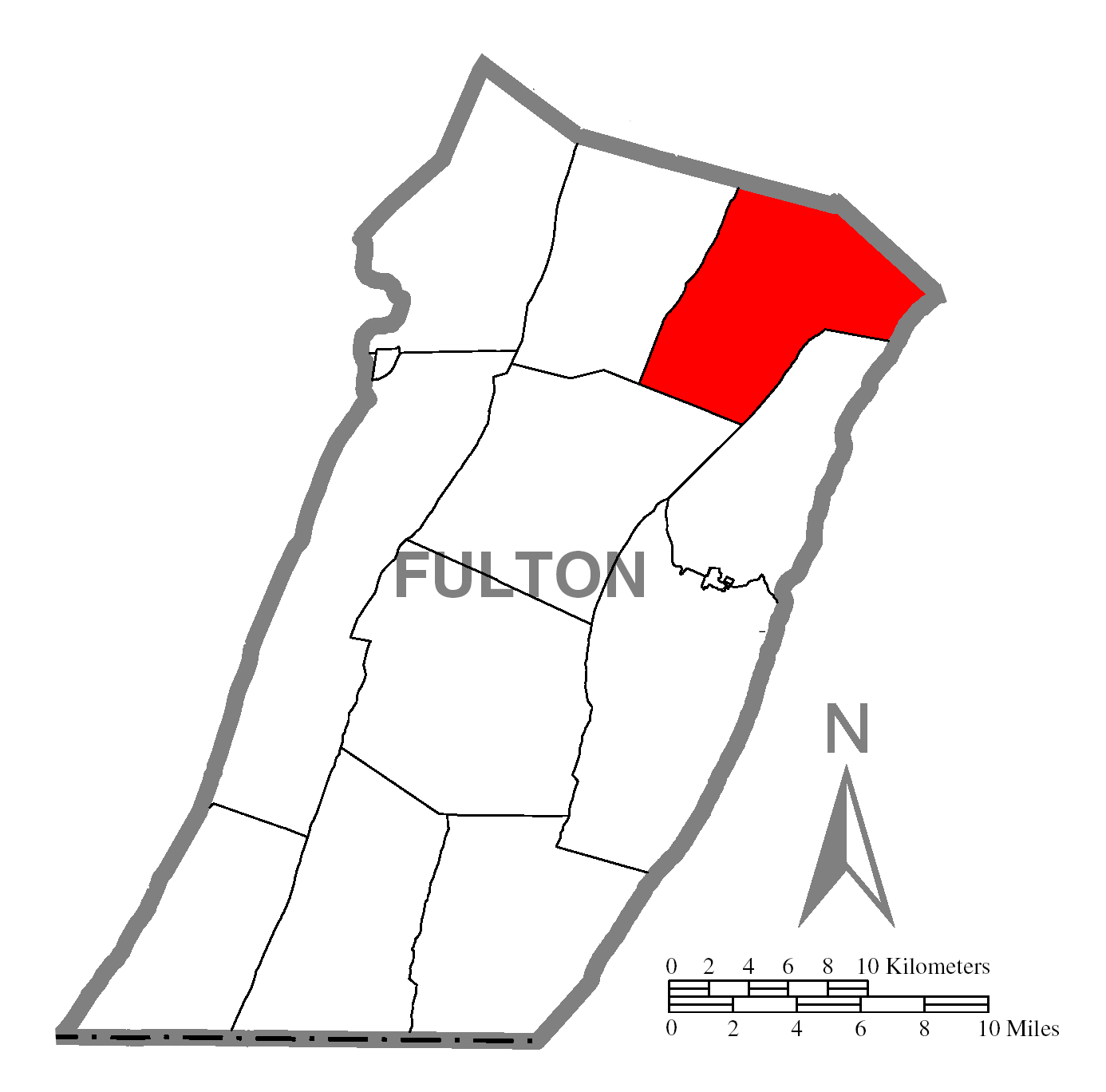
- Location of Dublin Township in Fulton County

- Location of Fulton County in Pennsylvania
- Country: United States
- State: Pennsylvania
- County: Fulton
- Established: 1790

Area
  - Total: 36.94 sq mi (95.68 km^{2})
  - Land: 36.92 sq mi (95.61 km^{2})
  - Water: 0.023 sq mi (0.06 km^{2})

Population (2020)
  - Total: 1,196 ▼
  - Estimate (2023): 1,188
  - Density: 33.1/sq mi (12.79/km^{2})
- Time zone: UTC-4 (EST)
  - Summer (DST): UTC-5 (EDT)
- Zip codes: 16689, 17728, 17729
- Area codes: 717, 814
- FIPS code: 42-057-20112

Dublin Township is a township in Fulton County, Pennsylvania, United States. The population was 1,196 at the 2020 census.

== History ==
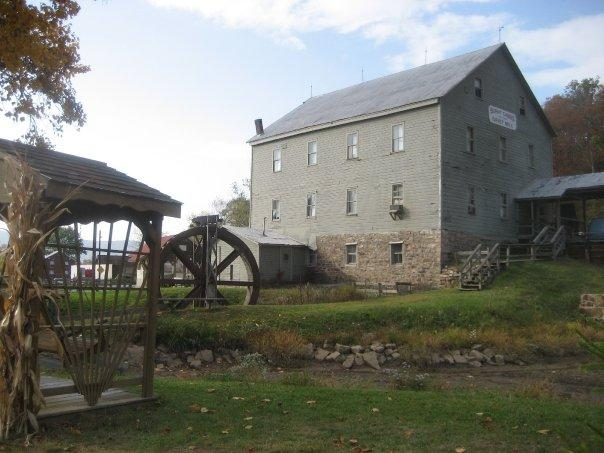
The historic grist mill at Burnt Cabins

The Burnt Cabins Gristmill Property and Burnt Cabins Historic District are listed on the National Register of Historic Places.

== Geography ==
According to the United States Census Bureau, the township has a total area of 36.9 square miles (96 km^{2}), of which 36.9 square miles (96 km^{2}) is land and 0.04 square miles (0.10 km^{2}), or 0.05%, is water.

== Demographics ==
Historical population
Census	Pop.	Note	%±
2000	1,277		—
2010	1,264		−1.0%
2020	1,195		−5.5%
2023 (est.)	1,188		−0.6%
U.S. Decennial Census

As of the census of 2000, there were 1,277 people, 497 households, and 367 families residing in the township. The population density was 34.6 inhabitants per square mile (13.4/km^{2}). There were 592 housing units at an average density of 16.0/sq mi (6.2/km^{2}). The racial makeup of the township was 99.45% White, 0.47% African American and 0.08% Asian. Hispanic or Latino of any race were 0.16% of the population.

There were 497 households, out of which 32.8% had children under the age of 18 living with them, 58.8% were married couples living together, 9.9% had a female householder with no husband present, and 26.0% were non-families. 22.7% of all households were made up of individuals, and 9.7% had someone living alone who was 65 years of age or older. The average household size was 2.50 and the average family size was 2.90.

In the township the population was spread out, with 24.0% under the age of 18, 7.1% from 18 to 24, 28.7% from 25 to 44, 26.0% from 45 to 64, and 14.2% who were 65 years of age or older. The median age was 39 years. For every 100 females, there were 91.2 males. For every 100 females age 18 and over, there were 89.6 males.

The median income for a household in the township was $35,469, and the median income for a family was $39,766. Males had a median income of $30,263 versus $21,080 for females. The per capita income for the township was $15,984. About 10.0% of families and 13.1% of the population were below the poverty line, including 26.3% of those under age 18 and 7.9% of those age 65 or over.

== See also ==
- List of Irish place names in other countries
