= WWCF =

- McConnellsburg, Pennsylvania; United States
- Broadcast area: Eastern Fulton County; Western Franklin County
- Frequency: 88.7 MHz
- Branding: WWCF Radio 88.7

Programming
- Format: Adult album alternative

Ownership
- Owner: Cove Mountain Educational Broadcasting, Inc.

History
- First air date: November 28, 2005

Technical information
- Licensing authority: FCC
- Facility ID: 85292
- Class: A
- ERP: 7 watts
- HAAT: 433.0 meters (1,420.6 ft)
- Transmitter coordinates: 39°55′33.00″N 77°57′24.00″W

Links
- Public license information: Public file; LMS
- Webcast: Listen live
- Website: wwcfradio.org

WWCF is an adult album alternative formatted radio station licensed to McConnellsburg, Pennsylvania, serving Eastern Fulton County and Western Franklin County in Pennsylvania. WWCF is owned and operated by Cove Mountain Educational Broadcasting, Inc.
