= Burnt Cabins Gristmill Property =

- U.S. National Register of Historic Places
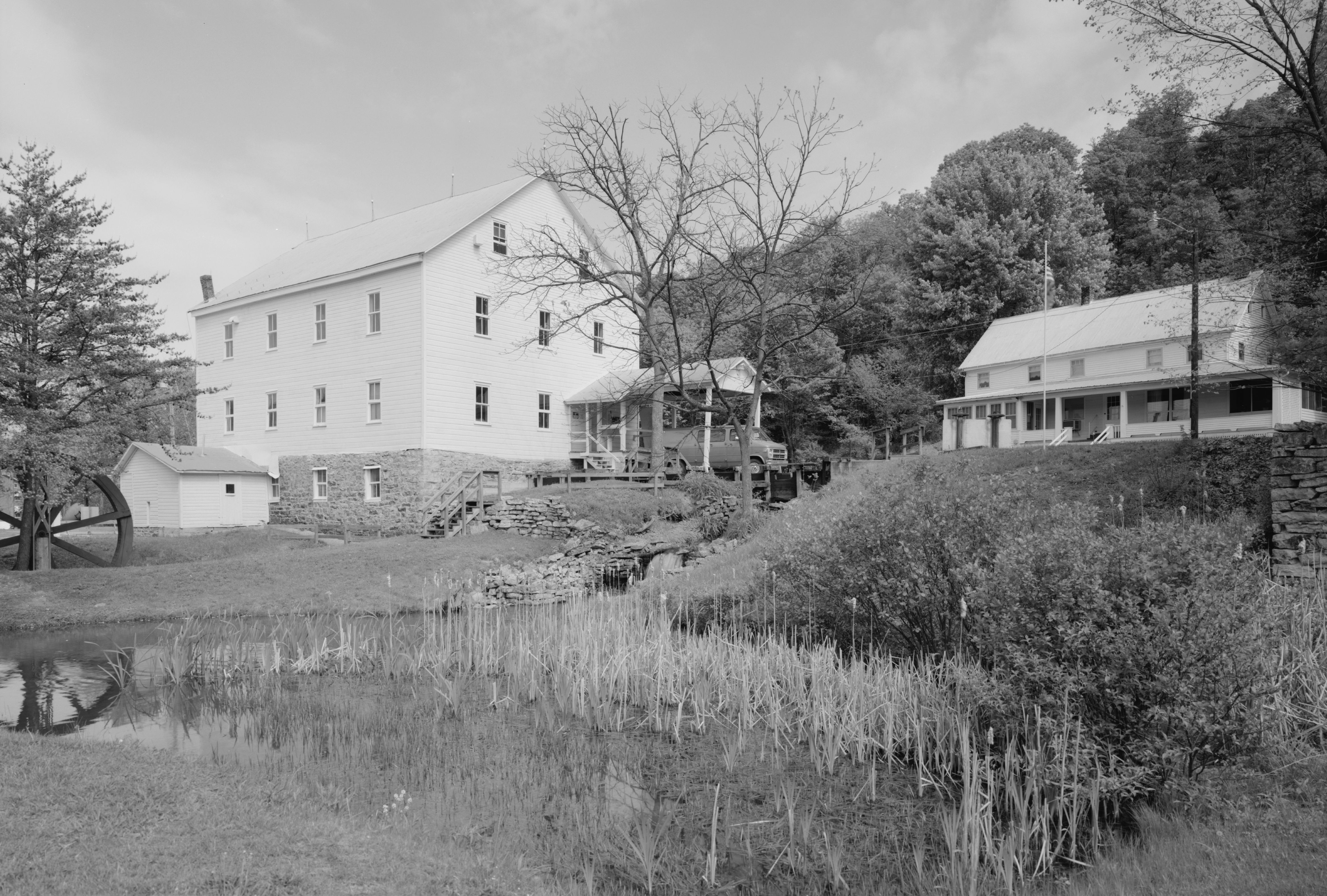
- 1992 HAER photo

- Location within Pennsylvania Location within the United States
- Location: Allen's Valley Road, Burnt Cabins, Pennsylvania
- Coordinates: 40°4′36″N 77°53′13″W
- Area: 10 acres (4.0 ha)
- Built: 1840
- NRHP reference No.: 80003502
- Added to NRHP: November 28, 1980

The Burnt Cabins Gristmill Property is an historic house and gristmill which are located in Burnt Cabins, Pennsylvania. It is also a contributing property to the Burnt Cabins Historic District.

== History and architectural features ==
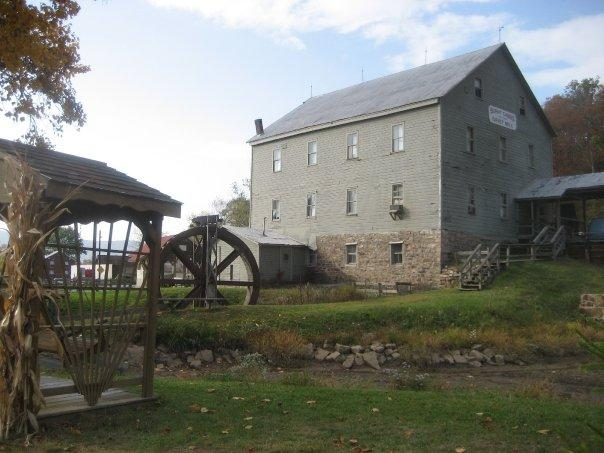
The gristmill in 2009

This historic property, which is located on Allen's Valley Road, within Dublin Township, Fulton County, Pennsylvania, includes a gristmill and house that were built in 1840. It was listed on the National Register of Historic Places in 1980.

It is also a contributing property to the Burnt Cabins Historic District.

The property was also documented by the Historic American Engineering Record in 1990.

== See also ==
- National Register of Historic Places listings in Fulton County, Pennsylvania
