= McConnell House (McConnellsburg, Pennsylvania) =

Historic house in Pennsylvania, United States

- U.S. National Register of Historic Places
- U.S. Historic district – Contributing property
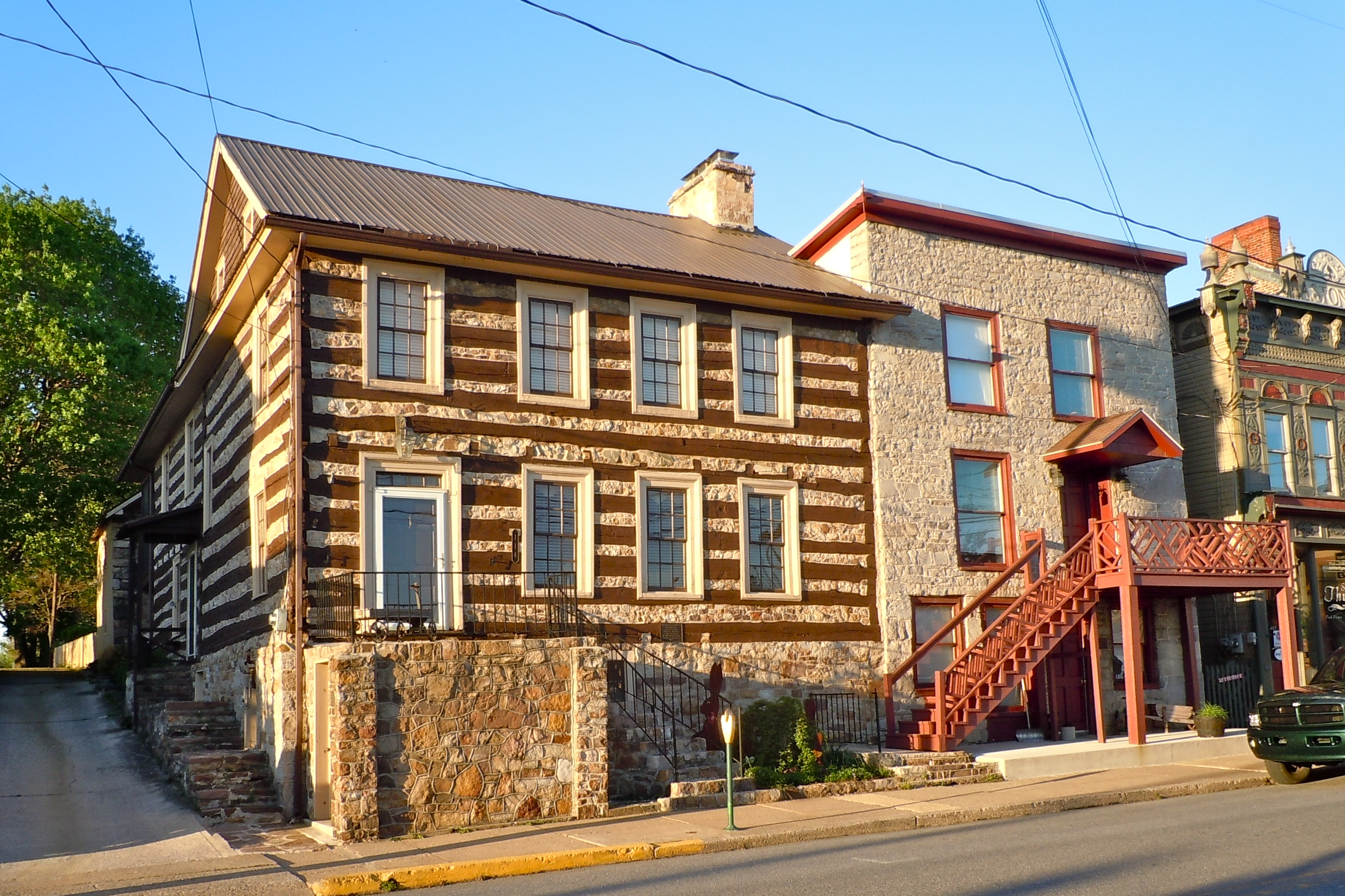
- McConnell House, April 2011

- Location within Pennsylvania Location within the United States
- Location: 114 Lincoln Way, McConnellsburg, Pennsylvania
- Coordinates: 39°55′58″N 77°59′59″W
- Area: less than one acre
- Built: c. 1760, 1834
- NRHP reference No.: 76001642
- Added to NRHP: November 21, 1976

The McConnell House is an historic home that is located in McConnellsburg Fulton County, Pennsylvania, United States.

The house was listed on the National Register of Historic Places in 1976. It is located in the McConnellsburg Historic District.

== History and architectural features ==
Built circa 1760, this historic structure is a 2 1/2-story, L-shaped, four-bay, yellow pine, log structure that sits on a stone foundation. The original rectangular section measures twenty-seven feet by twenty-four feet, six inches. It has a rear wing that was created in two sections; the newer section dates to 1834. The home's original occupant was Daniel McConnell, founder of McConnellsburg.
