= Fulton House (McConnellsburg, Pennsylvania) =

Historic house in Pennsylvania, United States

- U.S. National Register of Historic Places
- U.S. Historic district – Contributing property
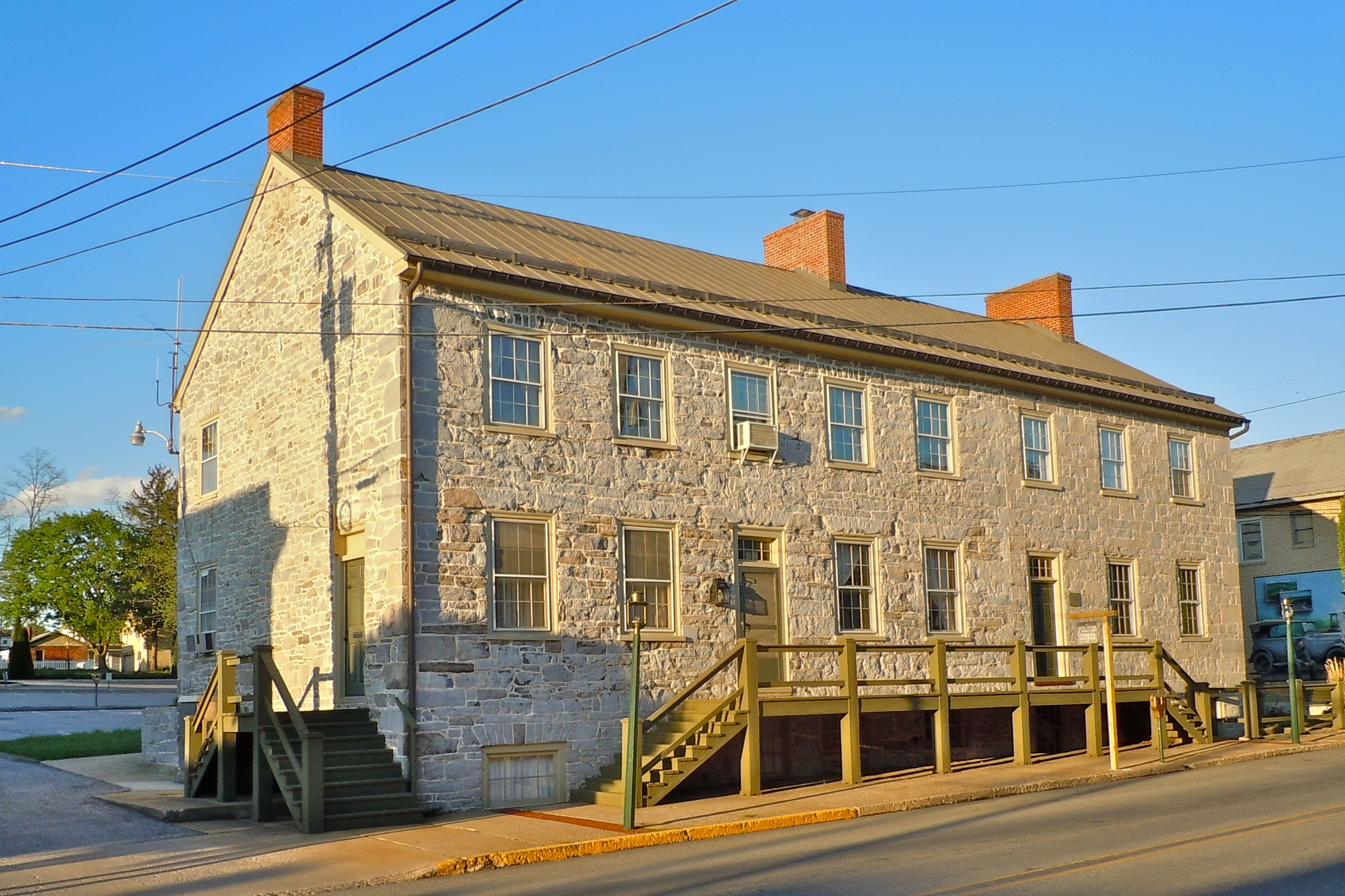
- Fulton House, April 2011

- Location within Pennsylvania Location within the United States
- Interactive map showing the location of Fulton House
- Location: 112–116 Lincoln Way East, McConnellsburg, Pennsylvania
- Coordinates: 39°55′56″N 77°59′55″W
- Built: 1793
- NRHP reference No.: 77001169
- Added to NRHP: July 20, 1977

The Fulton House is a prominent Georgian-influenced stone tavern built c. 1793 and located on Lincoln Way East in McConnellsburg, Pennsylvania, this inn once boarded governors and four presidents and was originally known as The Union Hotel. The building is now restored following a devastating 1944 fire that destroyed much of the 18th century interior of the original structure. The 1820 east end addition was not affected by the fire.

The house was listed on the National Register of Historic Places in 1977. It is located in the McConnellsburg Historic District.

The east end portion of the building houses the Fulton County Historical Society Museum, which is open to the public on special occasions.
