= WEEO-FM =

- McConnellsburg, Pennsylvania; United States
- Broadcast area: South Central Pennsylvania
- Frequency: 103.7 MHz
- Branding: News Talk 103-7FM

Programming
- Format: Conservative talk radio
- Affiliations: AccuWeather; Hagerstown Flying Boxcars

Ownership
- Owner: Michael Stapleford; (Magnum Broadcasting, Inc.)

History
- First air date: April 1997
- Former call signs: WIYQ (1996–1997); WEEO (1997–2000)

Technical information
- Licensing authority: FCC
- Facility ID: 76438
- Class: A
- ERP: 135 watts
- HAAT: 474 meters (1,555 ft)
- Transmitter coordinates: 39°55′25.0″N 77°57′20.0″W

Links
- Public license information: Public file; LMS
- Webcast: Listen live
- Website: newstalk1037fm.com

WEEO-FM (103.7 MHz) is a conservative talk radio formatted broadcast commercial radio station licensed to McConnellsburg, Pennsylvania, serving South Central Pennsylvania. WEEO-FM is owned and operated by Michael Stapleford, through licensee Magnum Broadcasting, Inc. (unrelated to Wisconsin's Magnum Media).

== History ==
On December 4, 1998, WEEO-FM changed their format from oldies to modern rock, branded as "Revolution 103.7".

In May 2005, WEEO-FM changed their format from modern rock to Top 40/CHR, branded as "Hot 103.7".

On April 14, 2008, WEEO-FM changed their format from Top 40/CHR to talk radio, branded as "FM Talk 103.7".
