= Cold Spring Farm (McConnellsburg, Pennsylvania) =

Historic house in Pennsylvania, United States

- U.S. National Register of Historic Places
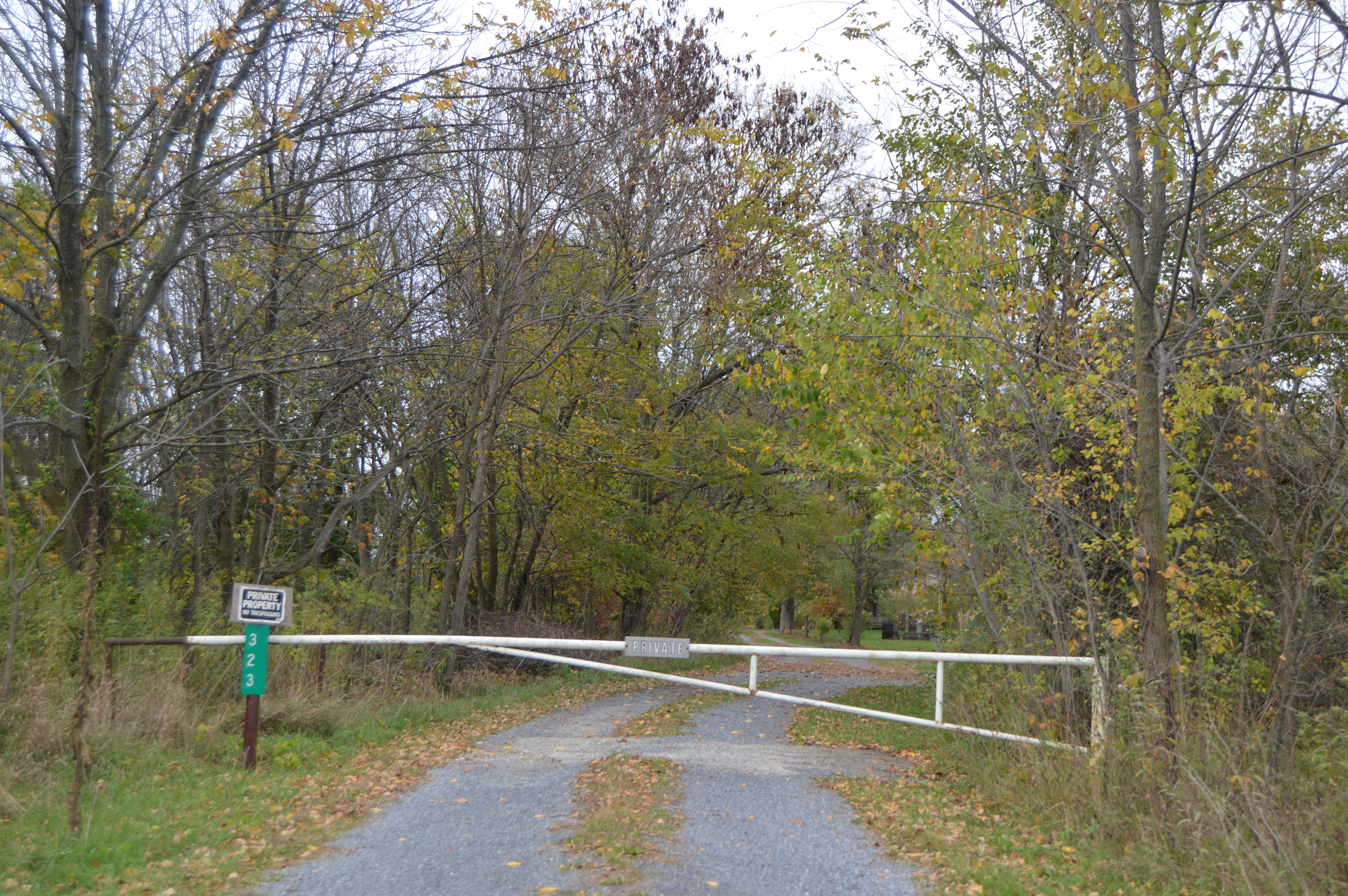
- Driveway to the farmstead

- Location within Pennsylvania Location within the United States
- Location: 323 Lions Park Dr., McConnellsburg, Todd, Pennsylvania
- Coordinates: 39°56′12″N 77°59′18″W
- Built: c. 1850, 1900
- Architectural style: Queen Anne, Colonial Revival
- NRHP reference No.: 00000966
- Added to NRHP: August 10, 2000

Cold Spring Farm, also known as Peter and Louisa Morton Farmstead, is a historic farmstead located in Todd Township, Fulton County, Pennsylvania. The property includes three contributing buildings: the main house (1900), sandstone spring house (c. 1850) with a Queen Anne style second floor addition, and a sandstone slaughterhouse (c. 1850). The house is a two-story, five-bay, brick structure with a cross-gable roof and Palladian window. It features a wraparound porch with wide, overhanging eaves.

It was listed on the National Register of Historic Places in 2000.
