= Scrub Ridge =

Ridge in Missouri, U.S.

Coordinates: 36°27′20″N 89°36′01″W

Scrub Ridge is a ridge in New Madrid County in the U.S. state of Missouri.

Scrub Ridge was so named on account of shrub trees on it.
