= McConnellsburg Historic District =

Historic district in Pennsylvania, United States

- U.S. National Register of Historic Places
- U.S. Historic district
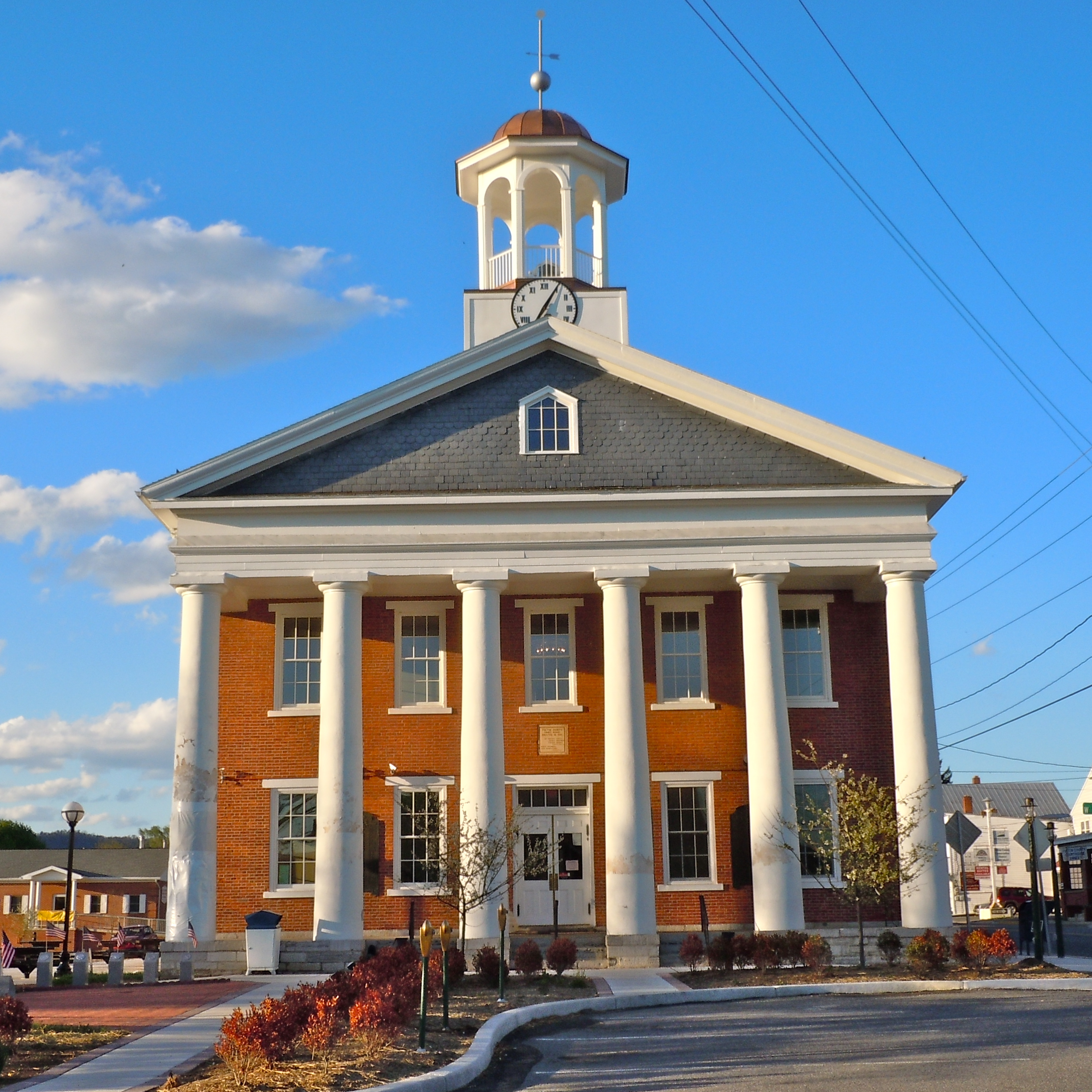
- Fulton County Courthouse, McConnellsburg Historic District, April 2011

- Location within Pennsylvania Location within the United States
- Location: Roughly, Lincoln Way from First St. to Fifth Ave. and Second St. from Spruce St. to Maple St., McConnellsburg, Pennsylvania
- Coordinates: 40°10′01″N 78°08′17″W
- Area: 25 acres (10 ha)
- Architectural style: Greek Revival, Georgian, Federal
- NRHP reference No.: 93000727
- Added to NRHP: August 9, 1993

The McConnellsburg Historic District is a national historic district that is located in McConnellsburg, Fulton County, Pennsylvania.

It was added to the National Register of Historic Places in 1992.

== History and architectural features ==
This district includes 142 contributing buildings and one contributing site that are located in the central business district and surrounding residential areas of McConnellsburg. The district includes buildings reflective of the Greek Revival, Georgian, and Federal styles. The buildings date to roughly between 1762 and 1940, and include commercial, institutional and residential buildings. Notable non-residential buildings include the Fulton County Courthouse (1852), Old Fulton County Jail, former Washington Hotel (1852), and the former Albert Stoner Store (1893). The contributing site is the cemetery associated with the Methodist Episcopal Church. Located in the district but separately listed are the Fulton House and the log cabin of Daniel McConnell.
