= Burnt Cabins, Pennsylvania =

Unincorporated community in Pennsylvania, US

- Burnt Cabins Historic District
- U.S. National Register of Historic Places
- U.S. Historic district
- Pennsylvania state historical marker
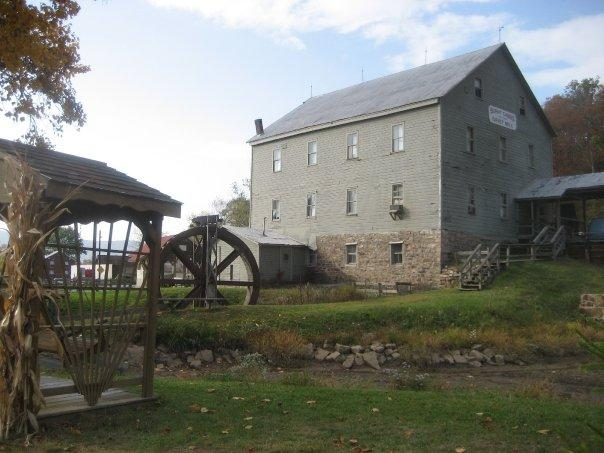
- Burnt Cabins Gristmill

- Location within Pennsylvania Location within the United States
- Location: LR23905 and US 522, Dublin Township, Fulton County, Pennsylvania
- Area: 50 acres (20 ha)
- Architectural style: Greek Revival, Gothic Revival
- MPS: Lincoln Highway Heritage Corridor Historic Resources: Franklin to Westmoreland Counties MPS
- NRHP reference No.: 98000566

Significant dates
- Added to NRHP: May 20, 1998
- Designated PHMC: June 04, 1947

Burnt Cabins is a historic unincorporated community in Dublin Township, Fulton County, Pennsylvania, United States, at the foot of Tuscarora Mountain. It is approximately three miles west of the Tuscarora Mountain Tunnel on I-76 (Pennsylvania Turnpike) and the turnpike runs within 100 yards of the village. U.S. Route 522 also runs through the village.

== History ==
The land was occupied by Native American tribes until 1758, and permanent European colonization did not start until 1763, after the French and Indian War. Nevertheless, by 1750, a hamlet known as Sidneyville had grown to 11 squatters cabins. The homes of these early settlers were burned by order of the provincial government to maintain the peace and to demonstrate to Native Americans that their ownership would be respected. Participants in the burning included Conrad Weiser, Richard Peters, George Croghan, and Benjamin Chambers.

The next day, being the 24th of May, Mr. Weiser and Mr. Galbreth, with the Under-Sheriff and myself, on our Way to the Mouth of the Juniata, called at Andrew Lycon's, with Intent only to inform him, that his Neighbours were bound for his Appearance and immediate Removal, and to caution him not to bring himself or them into Trouble by Refusal: But he presented a loaded Gun to the Magistrates and Sheriff, said, he would shoot the first Man that dared to come nigher. On this, he was disarmed, convicted, and committed to the Custody of the Sheriff. This whole Transaction happened in the Sight of a Tribe of Indians, who by Accident had in the Night-time fixed their Tent on that Plantation; and Lycon's Behaviour giving them great Offence, the Shickcalamies [sons of Shickellamy in Peters" party] insisted on our burning the Cabbin, or they would burn it themselves; Whereupon, when every Thing was taken out of it (Andrew Lycon, all the while assisting) and Possession being delivered to me, the empty Cabbin was set on Fire by the Under-Sheriff, and then Lycon was carried to Goal [Jail].

The area developed as a linear village along eighteenth century roads that led from Philadelphia across the Tuscarora and Allegheny Mountains to Pittsburgh. Burnt Cabins first developed along a pack horse trail that generally followed an earlier Indian trail. In 1755 the Forbes Road expanded the trail to get British troops and supplies in place to take Fort Duquesne. In 1771 the Three Mountains Road was opened to connect Burnt Cabins more directly to Shippensburg. However, by 1815 the Chambersburg and Ft. Bedford Turnpike was opened, bypassing both Burnt Cabins and Shippensburg from the most direct route between Philadelphia and Pittsburgh. Surprisingly, Burnt Cabins benefited by being bypassed by the turnpike, as the county population grew and drovers used the older, free roads to take their cattle to market.

The entire village, consisting of about 44 buildings and 50 acres, was listed on the National Register of Historic Places in 1998. The village's development was most influenced by the construction of the Burnt Cabins Grist Mill, which still produces flour and is listed separately on the National Register of Historic Places.

The town received international attention in May 1966 as a chief location of an eight-day manhunt for the ex-convict kidnapper of 17-year-old Peggy Ann Bradnick.

The 1964 book Bread-and-Butter Indian by Anne Colver is set among Pennsylvania Dutch settlers in the Burnt Cabins community. The story is based on true events in the life of Barbara Baum which took place there in 1783.

Burnt Cabin is in the Eastern Standard Time zone. Elevation is 889 feet.

== Demographics ==
Historical population
| Census | Pop. | Note | %± |

The United States Census Bureau defined Burnt Cabins as a census designated place (CDP) in 2023.

== ZIP code information ==
The Burnt Cabins ZIP code 17215 covers 11.92 sq mi (30.9 km^{2}), with a population of 437 and 163 housing units, with 123 of the latter occupied.
