= Todd Township, Fulton County, Pennsylvania =

Township in Pennsylvania, United States

Coordinates: 39°58′00″N 77°57′29″W

Todd Township
- Township
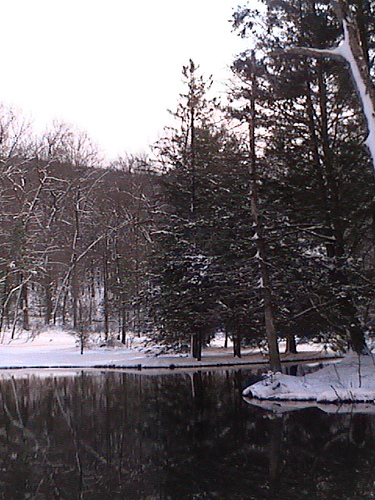
- Cowans Gap Lake at Cowans Gap State Park in Todd Township

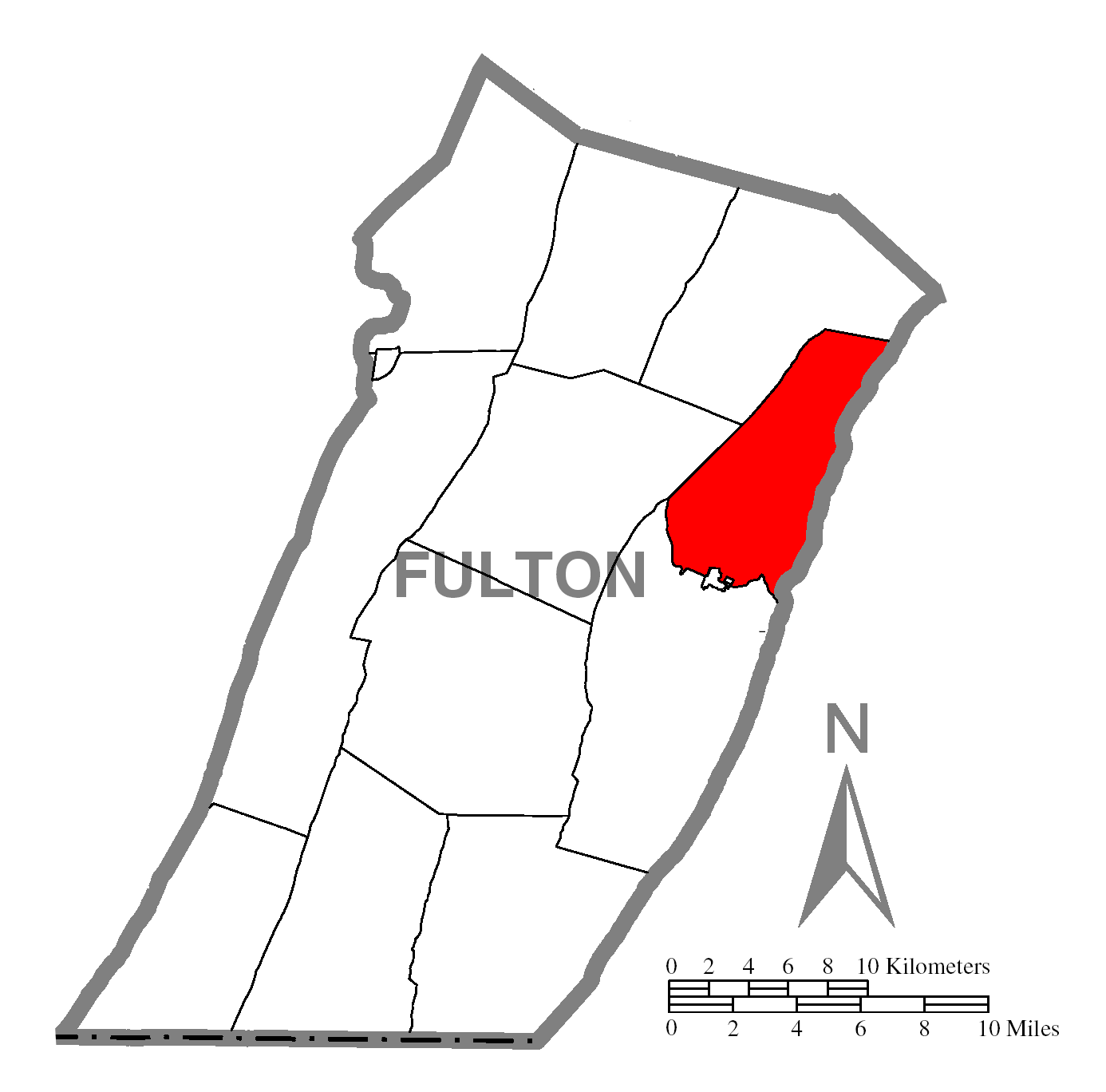
- Location of Todd Township in Fulton County

- Location of Fulton County in Pennsylvania
- Country: United States
- State: Pennsylvania
- County: Fulton County
- Established: 1730

Area
  - Total: 28.99 sq mi (75.08 km^{2})
  - Land: 28.92 sq mi (74.91 km^{2})
  - Water: 0.066 sq mi (0.17 km^{2})

Population (2020)
  - Total: 1,625 ▲
  - Estimate (2023): 1,616
  - Density: 52.8/sq mi (20.37/km^{2})
- Time zone: UTC-4 (EST)
  - Summer (DST): UTC-5 (EDT)
- FIPS code: 42-057-76984

Todd Township is a township in Fulton County, Pennsylvania, United States. The population was 1,625 at the 2020 census.

== History ==
The Cold Spring Farm and Cowans Gap State Park Family Cabin District are listed on the National Register of Historic Places.

== Geography ==
According to the United States Census Bureau, the township has a total area of 29.0 square miles (75.0 km^{2}), of which 28.9 square miles (74.9 km^{2}) is land and 0.1 square miles (0.2 km^{2}), or 0.21%, is water.

== Demographics ==
Historical population
Census	Pop.	Note	%±
2000	1,488		—
2010	1,527		2.6%
2020	1,625		6.4%
2023 (est.)	1,616		−0.6%
U.S. Decennial Census

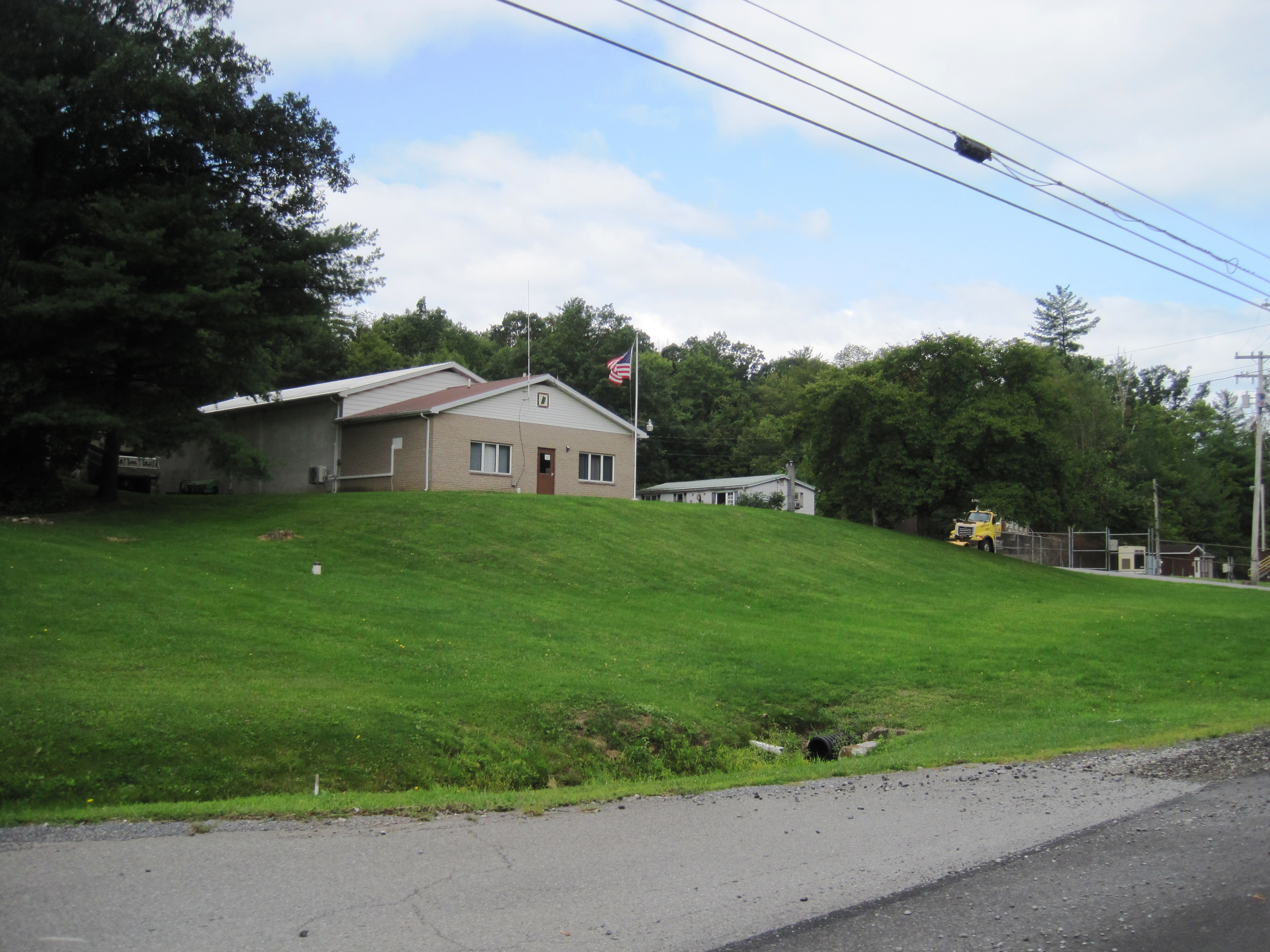
Todd Town Hall

As of the census of 2000, there were 1,488 people, 605 households, and 430 families residing in the township. The population density was 51.5 inhabitants per square mile (19.9/km^{2}). There were 735 housing units at an average density of 25.4/sq mi (9.8/km^{2}). The racial makeup of the township was 95.36% White, 3.43% African American, 0.47% Native American, 0.07% Asian, 0.07% from other races, and 0.60% from two or more races. Hispanic or Latino of any race were 0.54% of the population.

There were 605 households, out of which 31.2% had children under the age of 18 living with them, 56.4% were married couples living together, 9.8% had a female householder with no husband present, and 28.8% were non-families. 23.1% of all households were made up of individuals, and 7.6% had someone living alone who was 65 years of age or older. The average household size was 2.46 and the average family size was 2.87.

In the township the population was spread out, with 24.3% under the age of 18, 8.0% from 18 to 24, 30.4% from 25 to 44, 25.9% from 45 to 64, and 11.4% who were 65 years of age or older. The median age was 38 years. For every 100 females, there were 98.1 males. For every 100 females age 18 and over, there were 95.3 males.

The median income for a household in the township was $37,292, and the median income for a family was $41,976. Males had a median income of $31,728 versus $21,458 for females. The per capita income for the township was $16,726. About 7.6% of families and 10.2% of the population were below the poverty line, including 13.6% of those under age 18 and 9.8% of those age 65 or over.

== Recreation ==
Cowans Gap State Park, a Pennsylvania state park, is in Todd Township on Little Aughwick Creek, with part of it being in neighboring Metal Township in Franklin County.

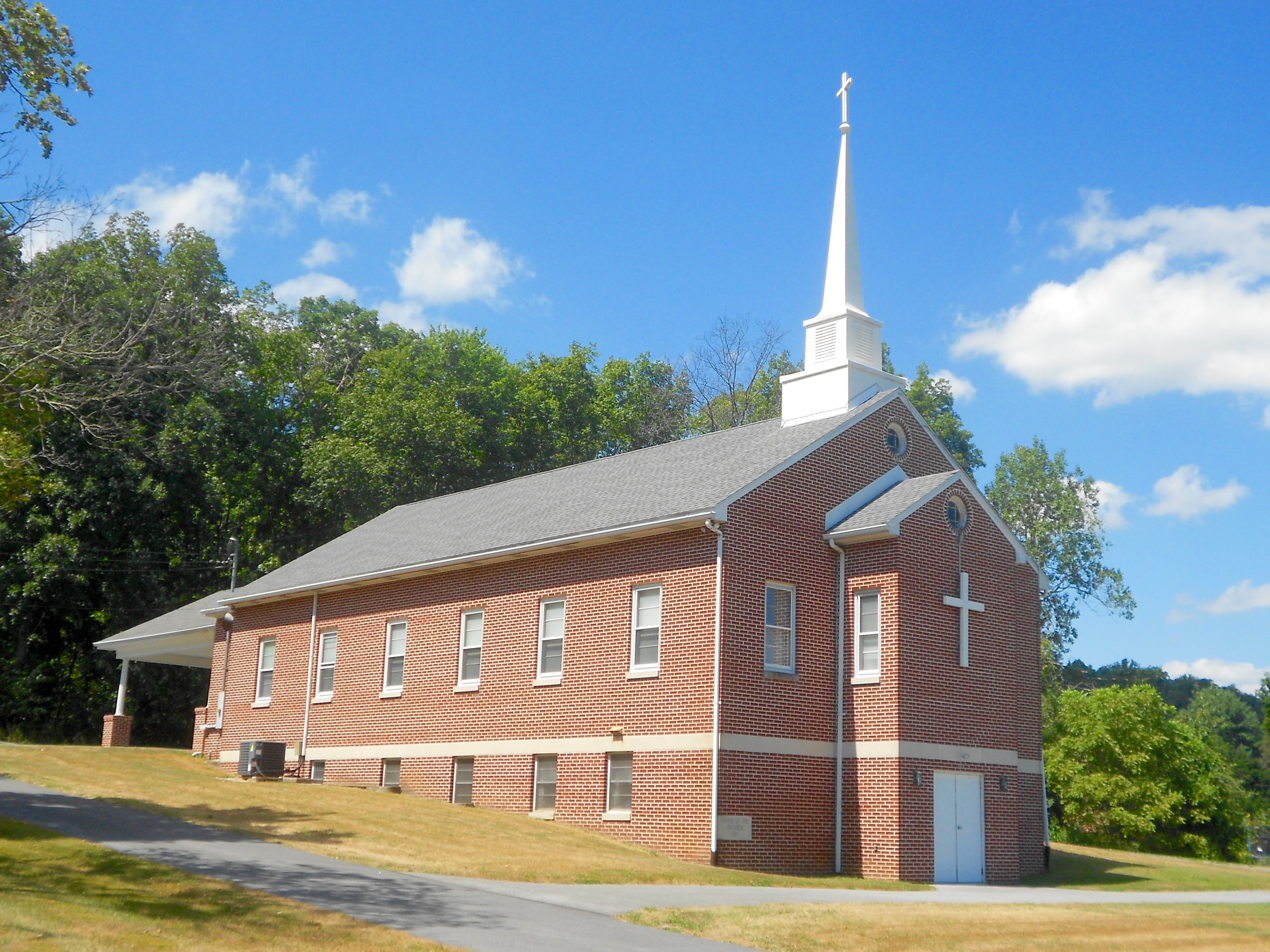
Knobsville Brethren Church
