= Ayr Township, Pennsylvania =

Township in Pennsylvania, United States

Coordinates: 39°53′22″N 78°01′21″W

Ayr Township
- Township
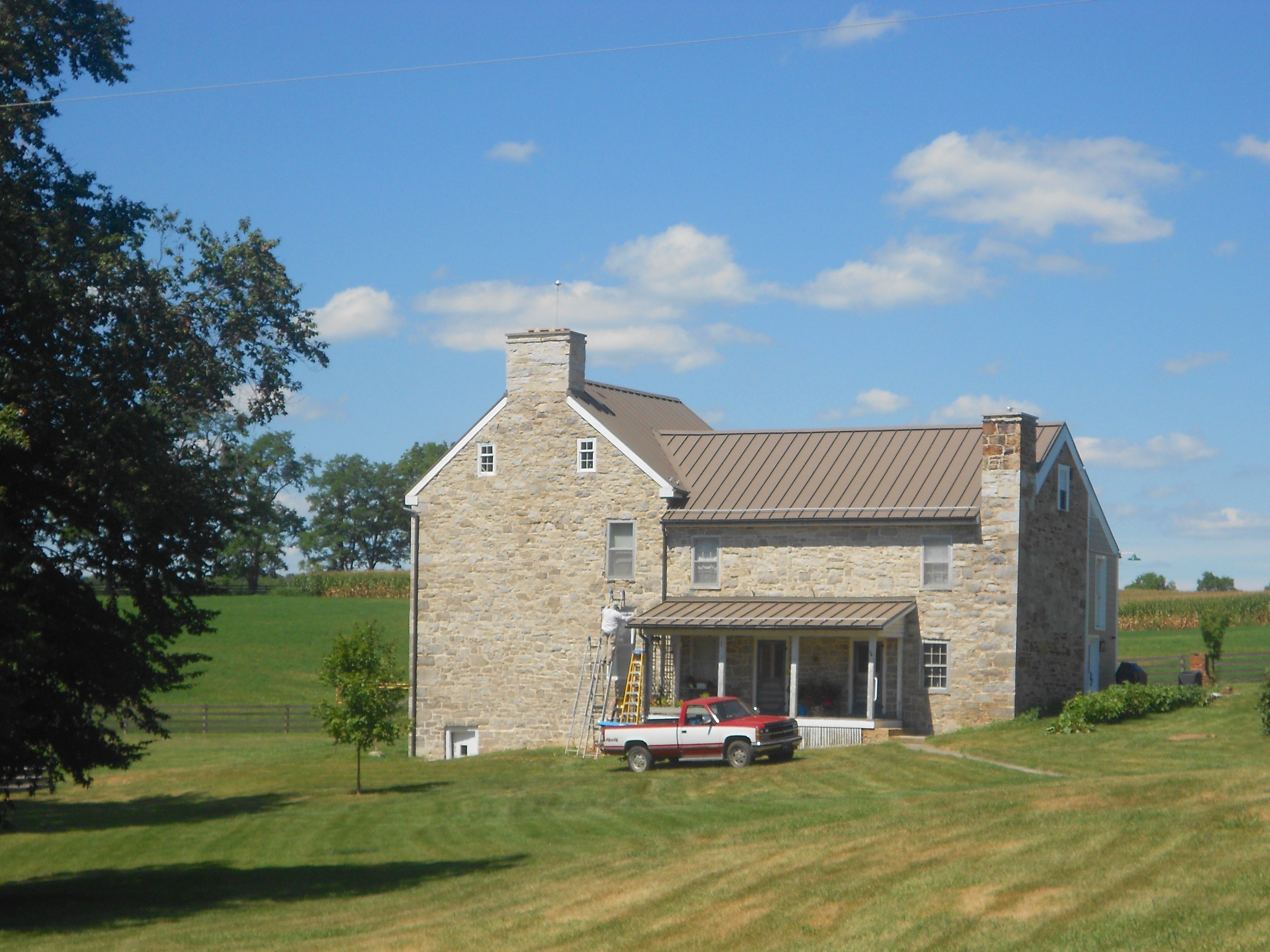
- Shady Spring Farm

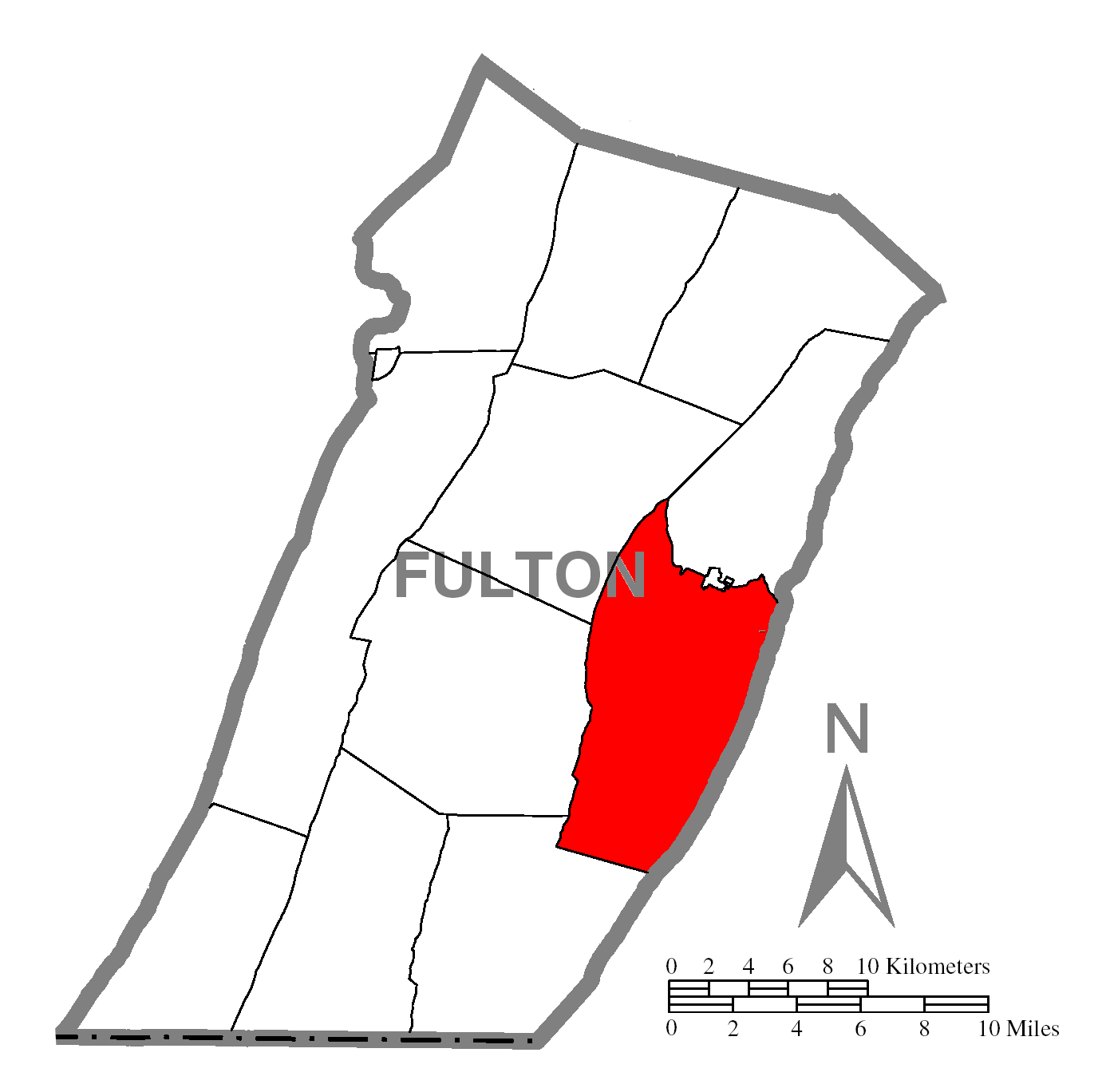
- Location of Ayr Township in Fulton County

- Location of Fulton County in Pennsylvania
- Country: United States
- State: Pennsylvania
- County: Fulton County
- Established: 1730

Area
  - Total: 46.58 sq mi (120.64 km^{2})
  - Land: 46.27 sq mi (119.84 km^{2})
  - Water: 0.31 sq mi (0.80 km^{2})

Population (2020)
  - Total: 2,031 ▲
  - Estimate (2023): 1,999
  - Density: 44.1/sq mi (17.04/km^{2})
- Time zone: UTC-4 (EST)
  - Summer (DST): UTC-5 (EDT)
- FIPS code: 42-057-03704

Ayr Township is a township in Fulton County, Pennsylvania, United States. The population was 2,031 at the 2020 census.

== Geography ==
According to the United States Census Bureau, the township has a total area of 46.5 square miles (120 km^{2}), of which 46.2 square miles (120 km^{2}) is land and 0.3 square miles (0.78 km^{2}), or 0.67%, is water.

== Demographics ==
Historical population
| Census | Pop. | Note | %± |
|---|---|---|---|
| 2000 | 1,982 | | — |
| 2010 | 1,942 | | −2.0% |
| 2020 | 2,031 | | 4.6% |
| 2023 (est.) | 1,999 | | −1.6% |
U.S. Decennial Census

As of the census of 2000, there were 1,982 people, 764 households, and 579 families residing in the township. The population density was 42.9 inhabitants per square mile (16.6/km^{2}). There were 911 housing units at an average density of 19.7/sq mi (7.6/km^{2}). The racial makeup of the township was 97.38% White, 1.06% African American, 0.25% Native American, 0.25% Asian, 0.05% Pacific Islander, and 1.01% from two or more races. Hispanic or Latino of any race were 0.66% of the population.

There were 764 households, out of which 34.0% had children under the age of 18 living with them, 62.8% were married couples living together, 8.0% had a female householder with no husband present, and 24.2% were non-families. 20.0% of all households were made up of individuals, and 7.7% had someone living alone who was 65 years of age or older. The average household size was 2.59 and the average family size was 2.98.

In the township the population was spread out, with 24.8% under the age of 18, 9.6% from 18 to 24, 28.0% from 25 to 44, 25.8% from 45 to 64, and 11.8% who were 65 years of age or older. The median age was 37 years. For every 100 females, there were 104.3 males. For every 100 females age 18 and over, there were 102.0 males.

The median income for a household in the township was $36,211, and the median income for a family was $42,566. Males had a median income of $29,700 versus $21,090 for females. The per capita income for the township was $17,380. About 9.2% of families and 9.8% of the population were below the poverty line, including 11.5% of those under age 18 and 11.8% of those age 65 or over.

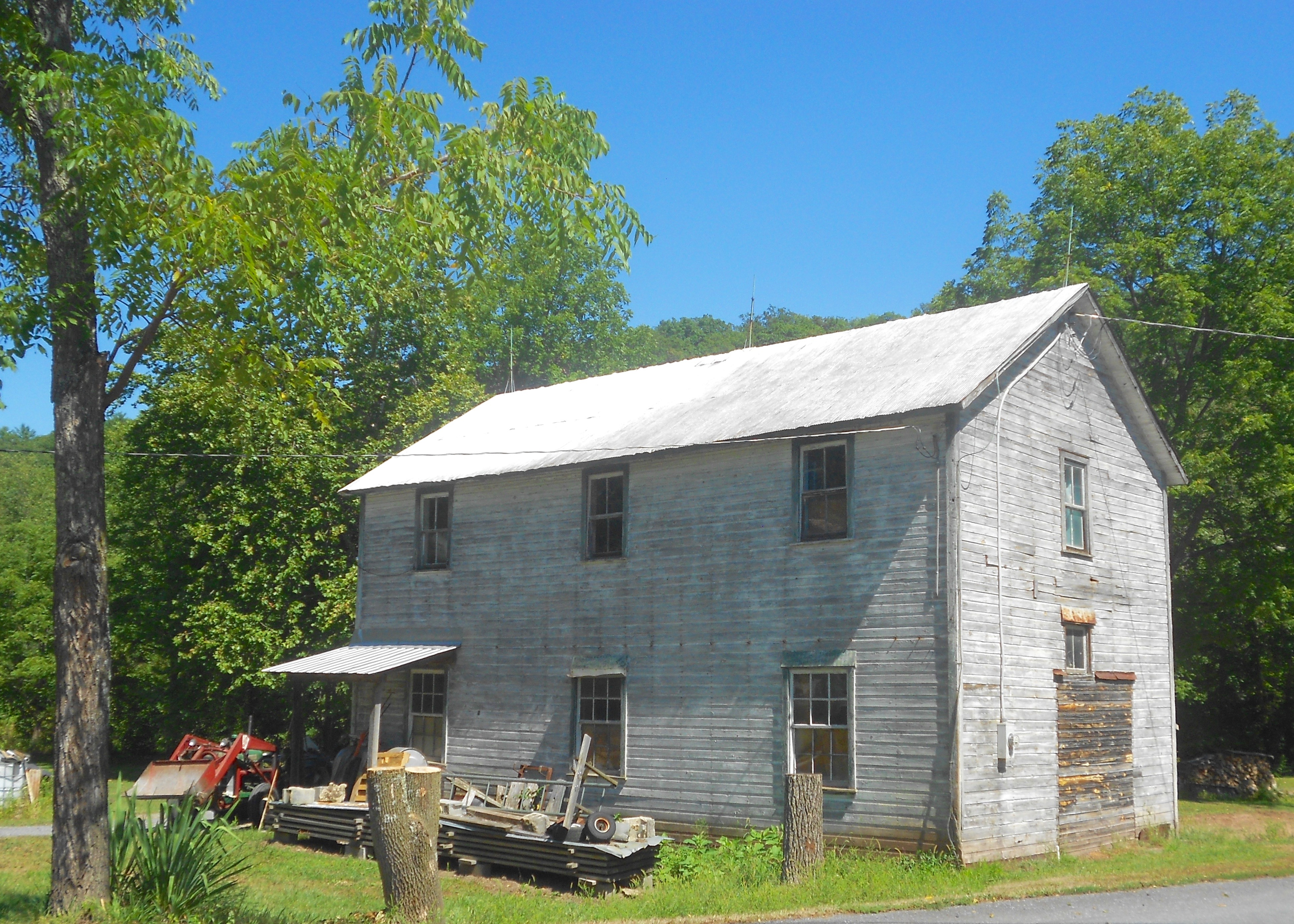
Big Cove Tannery

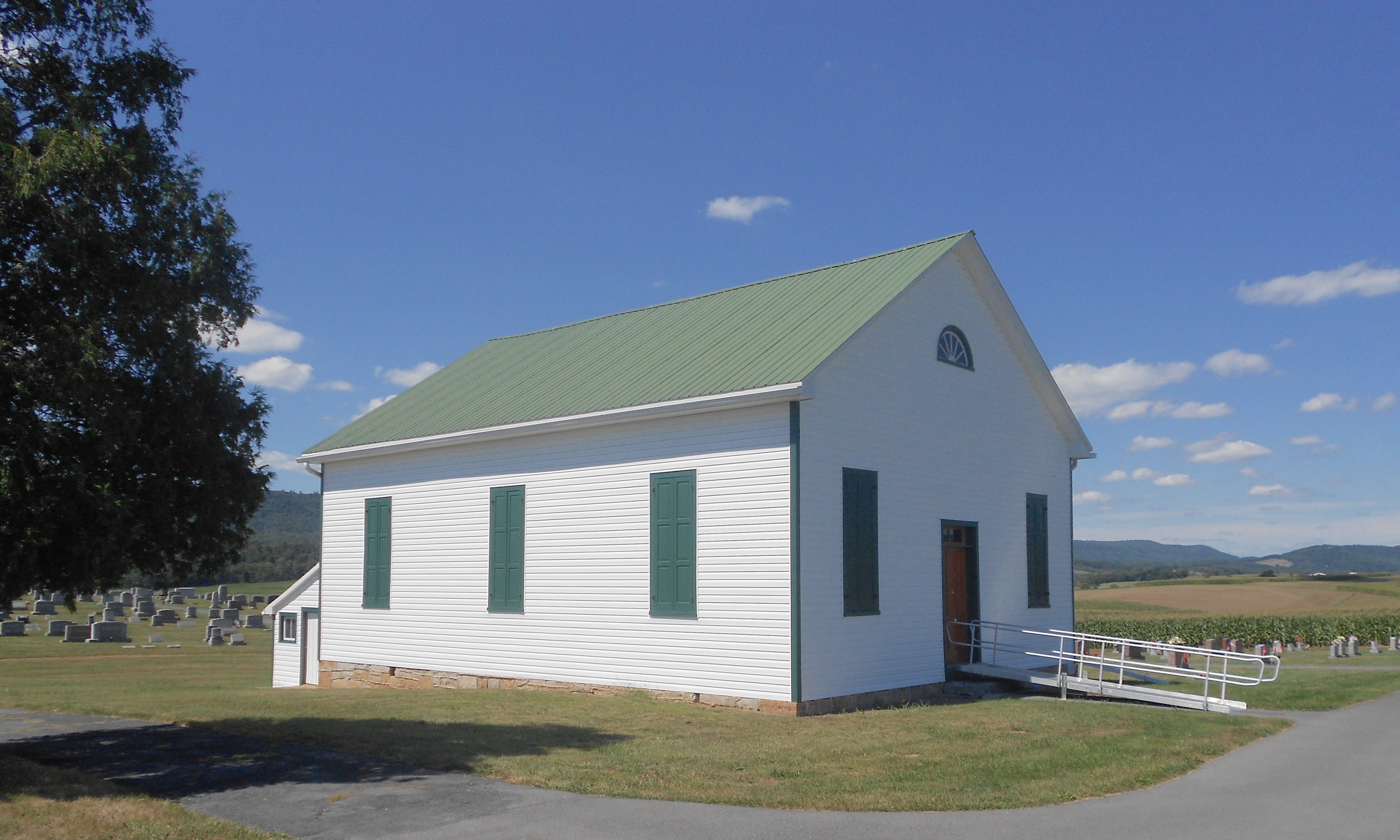
Associate Presbyterian Church

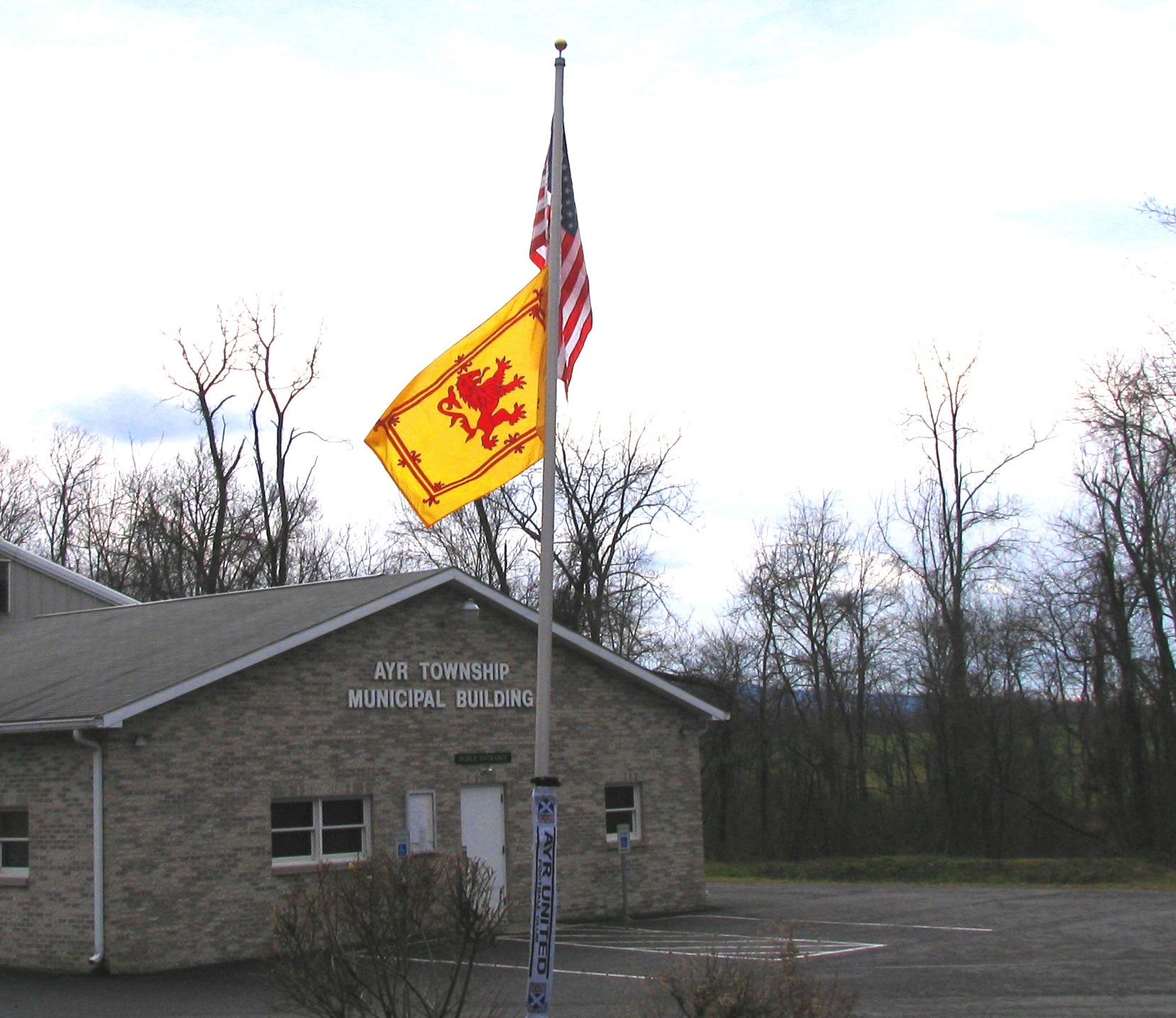
Ayr Township Municipal Building
