= Little Aughwick Creek =

Creek in Pennsylvania, United States

Coordinates: 40.09642°N 77.95829°W

Little Aughwick Creek is a 10.8-mile-long (17.4 km) tributary of Aughwick Creek in Fulton and Huntingdon counties, Pennsylvania in the United States.

Little Aughwick Creek joins with Sideling Hill Creek near the community of Maddensville to form Aughwick Creek.

Via Aughwick Creek and the Juniata River, it is a tributary of the Susquehanna River, flowing to the Chesapeake Bay and the Atlantic Ocean.

== See also ==
- List of rivers of Pennsylvania
