= McConnellsburg, Pennsylvania =

Borough in Pennsylvania, US

- Borough
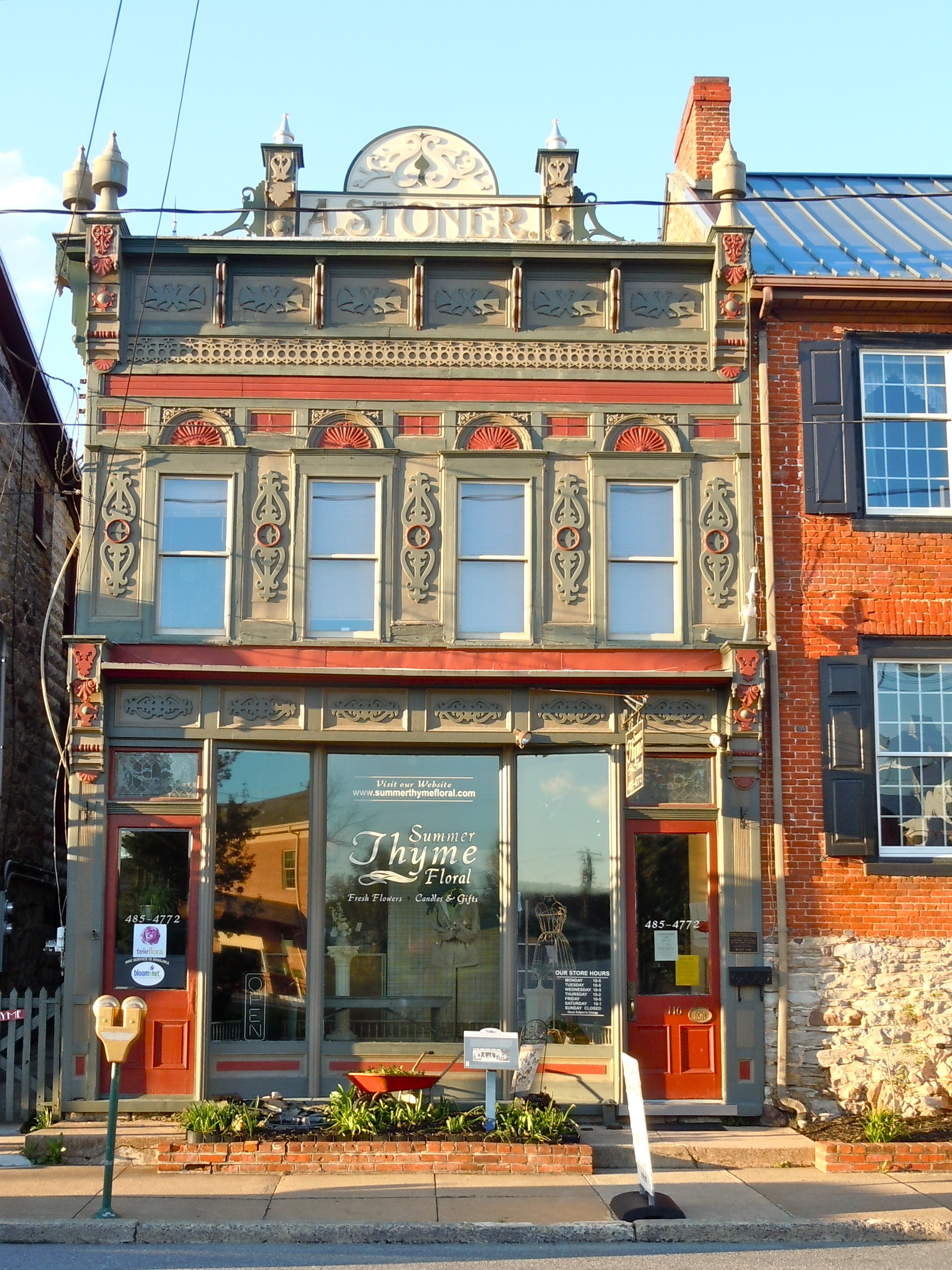
- Stoner's Store in the historic district
- Etymology: Daniel McConnell
- Location of McConnellsburg in Fulton County, Pennsylvania.

- Location within Pennsylvania Location within the United States
- Coordinates: 39°55′53″N 77°59′56″W
- Country: United States
- State: Pennsylvania
- County: Fulton County
- Founded: 1786-04-20

Government
  - Mayor: Jeremy A Hollinshead

Area
  - Total: 0.35 sq mi (0.90 km^{2})
  - Land: 0.35 sq mi (0.90 km^{2})
  - Water: 0 sq mi (0.00 km^{2})
- Elevation: 892 ft (272 m)

Population (2020)
  - Total: 1,151
  - Density: 3,313.4/sq mi (1,279.31/km^{2})
- Time zone: UTC-4 (EST)
  - Summer (DST): UTC-5 (EDT)
- ZIP code: 17233
- Area codes: 717
- FIPS code: 42-057-46000
- GNIS feature ID: 1215249

McConnellsburg is a borough in and the county seat of Fulton County, Pennsylvania, United States. The population was 1,150 at the 2020 census.

== History ==
The McConnellsburg Historic District was recognized by the United States Department of the Interior in 1993 when it was listed in the National Register of Historic Places. The district consists of 144 structures that contribute to its historic character. Of notable meaning are the numerous taverns, inns, automotive garages and other travel-related structures still in existence today, which includes the Fulton House, the Fulton County Courthouse, and the log cabin of Daniel McConnell, who laid out the borough on April 20, 1786. It was further incorporated on March 26, 1814.

== Economy ==
Currently McConnellsburg's largest economic driver is Oshkosh Corporation-owned JLG Industries, a major manufacturer of construction and maintenance access-related lifting equipment such as boomlifts, etc.

== Geography ==
McConnellsburg is located in eastern Fulton County in the Ridge and Valley section of the Appalachian Mountains in southern Pennsylvania. It is situated in a 2-mile-wide (3 km) valley between Tuscarora Mountain to the east and Little Scrub Ridge and Meadow Grounds Mountain to the west.

According to the United States Census Bureau, the borough has a total area of 0.35 square miles (0.9 km^{2}), all land.

U.S. Route 522 passes north–south through the center of town as Second Street. The main east–west street through the town center is Lincoln Way, or old U.S. Route 30 (the Lincoln Highway). U.S. Route 30 now bypasses the borough on a limited access highway to the north. The west end of Pennsylvania Route 16 is in McConnellsburg, following Lincoln Way and then the Buchanan Trail southeast out of town.

Via US 522 it is 24 miles (39 km) south to Hancock, Maryland, and 9 miles (14 km) north to the Pennsylvania Turnpike. US 30 leads east 21 miles (34 km) to Chambersburg and 19 miles (31 km) west to Breezewood. PA 16 leads southeast 10 miles (16 km) to Mercersburg and 20 miles (32 km) to Greencastle.

== Demographics ==
Historical population
Census	Pop.	Note	%±
1850	477		—
1860	556		16.6%
1870	552		−0.7%
1880	584		5.8%
1890	594		1.7%
1900	576		−3.0%
1910	579		0.5%
1920	689		19.0%
1930	768		11.5%
1940	1,055		37.4%
1950	1,136		7.7%
1960	1,245		9.6%
1970	1,228		−1.4%
1980	1,178		−4.1%
1990	1,106		−6.1%
2000	1,073		−3.0%
2010	1,220		13.7%
2020	1,151		−5.7%
2021 (est.)	1,141	▼	−0.9%

As of the census of 2000, there were 1,073 people, 506 households, and 271 families residing in the borough. The population density was 2,998.2 inhabitants per square mile (1,157.6/km^{2}). There were 551 housing units at an average density of 1,539.6 per square mile (594.4/km^{2}). The racial makeup of the borough was 97.02% White, 0.84% African American, 0.19% Native American, 0.09% Asian, 0.09% Pacific Islander, and 1.77% from two or more races. Hispanic or Latino of any race were 0.56% of the population.

There were 506 households, out of which 22.9% had children under the age of 18 living with them, 37.7% were married couples living together, 12.1% had a female householder with no husband present, and 46.4% were non-families. 42.1% of all households were made up of individuals, and 21.3% had someone living alone who was 65 years of age or older. The average household size was 2.01 and the average family size was 2.72.

In the borough the population was spread out, with 19.9% under the age of 18, 6.9% from 18 to 24, 24.9% from 25 to 44, 20.4% from 45 to 64, and 28.0% who were 65 years of age or older. The median age was 44 years. For every 100 females there were 80.0 males. For every 100 females age 18 and over, there were 75.9 males.

The median income for a household in the borough was $25,987, and the median income for a family was $33,125. Males had a median income of $28,478 versus $20,577 for females. The per capita income for the borough was $16,884. About 14.9% of families and 17.3% of the population were below the poverty line, including 31.7% of those under age 18 and 14.9% of those age 65 or over.

== Education ==
- Central Fulton School District

== Media ==
Newspaper: The Fulton County News

Television

McConnellsburg, and the rest of Fulton County, are located in the Washington, D.C. television market, but also are covered by Altoona and Harrisburg channels-but stations are difficult to catch with an antenna, requiring cable or satellite. An antenna can, however, sometimes get stations based out of the Hagerstown sub-market, such as WDVM and WWPB.

Local stations include

ABC: WJLA, WHTM

NBC: WRC, WGAL

CBS: WUSA, WHP

Fox: WTTG, WPMT

The CW: WDCW, WHP-DT3

MyNetworkTV: WDCA, WHP-DT2

=== Radio ===
- WEEO-FM, 103.7 - talk radio format
- WWCF-FM, 88.7 - Adult album alternative format

== Notable people ==
- Elton Britt, country music singer
- Jordan Ott, head coach of the Phoenix Suns
- Tom Peck, racing driver
- Toby Shaw, news presenter
