= Pennsylvania State Game Lands Number 60 =

Park in the United States

- Location within Pennsylvania Location within the United States
- Location: Blair County; Centre County; Clearfield County
- Nearest city: Altoona
- Coordinates: 40°45′52″N 78°17′45″W40°46′27″N 78°25′8″W
- Area: 8,764 acres (3,547 ha)
- Elevation: 2,470 feet (750 m)
- Max. elevation: 2,656 feet (810 m)
- Min. elevation: 1,360 feet (410 m)
- Owner: Pennsylvania Game Commission
- Website: www.pgc.pa.gov/HuntTrap/StateGameLands/Documents/SGL%20Maps/SGL__60.pdf

The Pennsylvania State Game Lands Number 60 are Pennsylvania State Game Lands in Blair, Centre and Clearfield Counties in Pennsylvania in the United States providing hunting, bird watching, and other activities.

== Geography ==
Game Lands Number 60 consists of two parcels located in Snyder Township in Blair County, Rush and Taylor Townships in Centre County, and in Beccaria, Bigler and Gulich Townships in Clearfield County. Prince Gallitzin State Park and Glendale Lake are located to the southwest, Rothrock State Forest and Stone Valley Forest are located to the southeast. Pennsylvania State Game Lands Number 108 and 158 are located to the southeast, 120 is located to the west, 33 is located to the northeast, and 176 is located to the east. The western parcel of the Game Lands is drained by Clearfield Creek, and the western portion of the eastern parcel is drained by Moshannon Creek, and the eastern portion by Bald Eagle Creek. All are part of the Susquehanna River watershed. Nearby communities include populated places Almaden, Bald Eagle, Banian Junction, Beccaria, Beulah, Chesterfield, Fernwood, Gardner, Ginter, Glen Hope, Hale, Hegarty Crossroads, Heverly, Janesville, Kendrick, Morann, New London, Northwood, Ramey, Sandy Ridge, Smoke Run, Tyrone, Utahville, Viola, Waltzvale, and Whiteside. Pennsylvania Route 253 is north/south oriented to the east of the western parcel, Pennsylvania Route 729 runs to the west and south. Pennsylvania Route 453 runs west and south of the eastern parcel, and Pennsylvania Route 350 separates SGL 60 and Pennsylvania State Game Lands Number 33. The highway carrying Interstate 99 and U.S. Route 220 also lies to the south of the eastern parcel.

== Statistics ==
SGL 324 was entered into the Geographic Names Information System on 24 September 2008 as identification number 1188519, listing the elevation as 2,470 feet (750 m). It consists of 8,764 acres (3,547 ha) in two parcels. Elevations in the western parcel range from 1,360 feet (410 m) along Muddy Run to 1,645 feet (501 m) near Mayo Lane east of Pennsylvania Route 253, and elevations in the western parcel range from 1,540 feet (470 m) along Pennsylvania Route 350 near Big Fill Run to 2,656 feet (810 m) near Old Hoover Road off Pennsylvania Route 453.

== Biology ==
Hunting and trapping species include bear (Ursus americanus), deer (Odocoileus virginianus), Ruffed grouse (Bonasa umbellus), and turkey (Meleagris gallopavo).

== See also ==
- Pennsylvania State Game Lands
- Pennsylvania State Game Lands Number 26, also located in Blair County
- Pennsylvania State Game Lands Number 73, also located in Blair County
- Pennsylvania State Game Lands Number 108, also located in Blair County
- Pennsylvania State Game Lands Number 118, also located in Blair County
- Pennsylvania State Game Lands Number 147, also located in Blair County
- Pennsylvania State Game Lands Number 158, also located in Blair County
- Pennsylvania State Game Lands Number 166, also located in Blair and Huntingdon Counties
