= Pennsylvania Route 453 =

State highway in Pennsylvania, US

Pennsylvania Route 453

Route information
- Maintained by PennDOT
- Length: 43.756 mi (70.418 km)

Major junctions
- South end: US 22 in Water Street
- PA 45 near Water Street; PA 550 near Tyrone; I-99 / US 220 in Tyrone; PA 253 from Gulich Township to Ramey; PA 153 in Gulich Township; PA 729 in Gulich Township; PA 53 in Bigler Township
- North end: PA 879 in Curwensville

Location
- Country: United States
- State: Pennsylvania
- Counties: Huntingdon, Blair, Clearfield

Highway system
- Pennsylvania State Route System; Interstate; US; State; Scenic; Legislative
← PA 452	→ PA 454

Pennsylvania Route 453 (PA 453) is a 43.8-mile-long (70.5 km) state highway located in Huntingdon, Blair, and Clearfield counties in Pennsylvania. The southern terminus is at U.S. Route 22 (US 22) in Water Street; the northern terminus is at PA 879 in Curwensville.

== Route description ==
=== Huntingdon and Blair counties ===
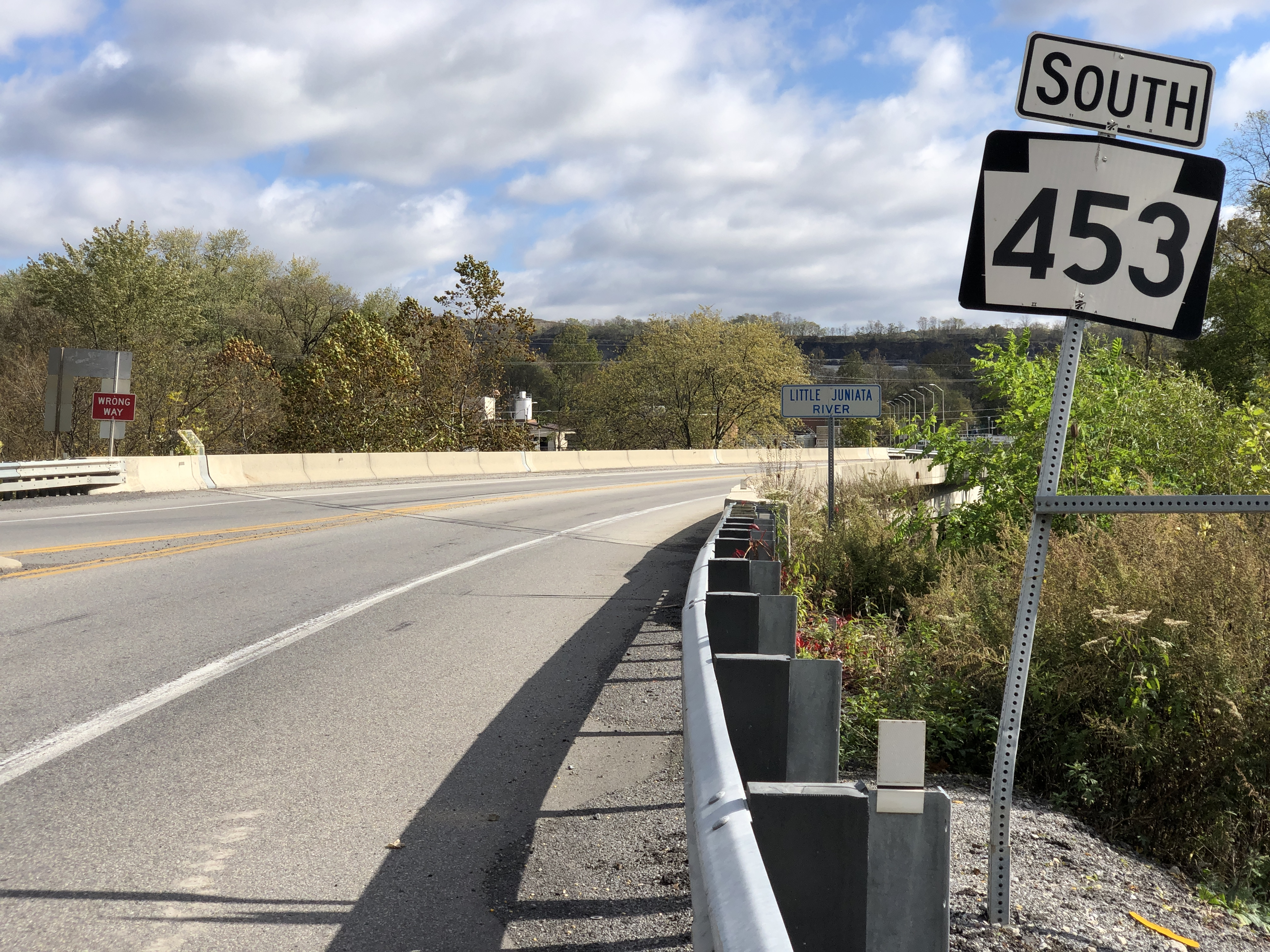
PA 453 southbound past PA 550 in Snyder Township

PA 453 begins at an intersection with US 22 in the community of Water Street in Morris Township, Huntingdon County, heading north on three-lane undivided Birmingham Pike, carrying two northbound lanes and one southbound lane. The road heads through woods before heading into agricultural areas and intersecting the western terminus of PA 45. At this point, the route becomes concurrent with PA 45 Truck and narrows to two lanes as it heads northwest through more open farmland with occasional woods. PA 453 enters Tyrone Township in Blair County and turns north through more agricultural areas as an unnamed road, gaining a second northbound lane before also gaining a second southbound lane. The route eventually narrows from four lanes back to two lanes and heading northwest through wooded areas in a cut. The road crosses the Little Juniata River and Norfolk Southern's Pittsburgh Line into Warriors Mark Township in Huntingdon County and becomes Birmingham Pike again, heading through more woodland along the northeast bank of the river and passing through Shoenberger. The route passes through the borough of Birmingham before heading back into Warriors Mark Township and running through more rural areas.

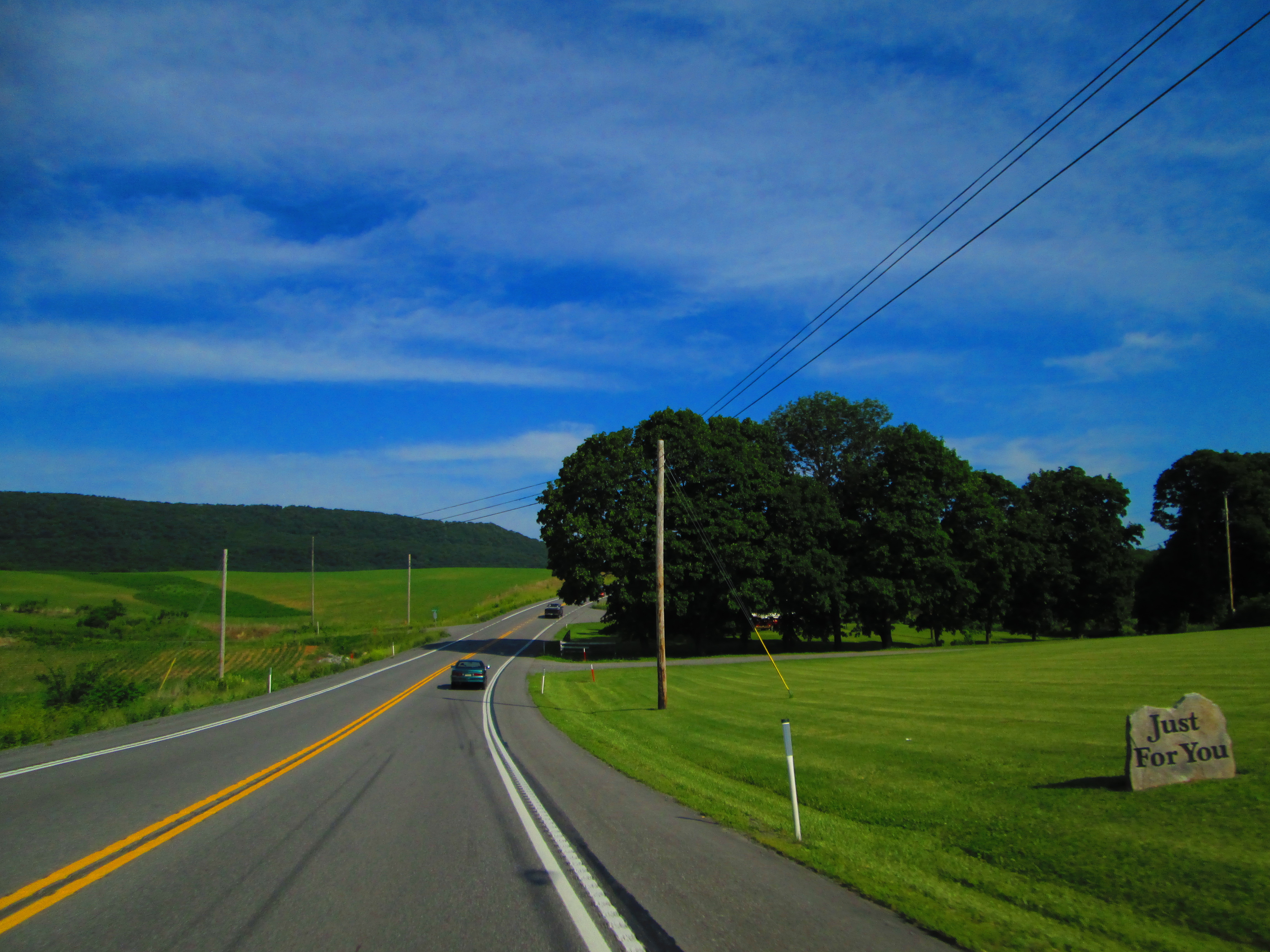
PA 453 southbound north of Water Street

PA 453 continues into Snyder Township in Blair County as an unnamed road and passes to the south of a quarry, crossing the Little Juniata River. The road heads to the northeast of the Norfolk Southern railroad line and crosses the river again, coming to an intersection with PA 550. At this point, PA 45 Truck splits from PA 453 by heading northeast on PA 550 and PA 453 turns west-northwest to cross through a gap in forested Bald Eagle Mountain. The route enters the borough of Tyrone and widens into a four-lane divided highway as it comes to an interchange with Interstate 99 (I-99)/US 220. Past this, PA 453 becomes East 11th Street and passes businesses, coming to an intersection with US 220 Business. At this point, the route turns north to form a concurrency with US 220 Business on two-lane undivided Pennsylvania Avenue, passing a mix of homes and commercial establishments. PA 453 splits from US 220 Business by turning west onto West 14th Street, running through more of the town and crossing a Nittany and Bald Eagle Railroad line. The route turns north onto Lincoln Avenue before turning west onto West 15th Street and heading through residential areas. The road becomes Janesville Pike as it heads into more rural areas of homes, forming the border between Tyrone to the north and Snyder Township to the south before turning northwest and fully entering Tyrone again. PA 453 heads back into Snyder Township and heads into forested areas with occasional homes, passing to the southwest of the Tyrone Reservoir. The route winds northwest through more dense forests before turning to the west.

=== Clearfield County ===
PA 453 enters Gulich Township in Clearfield County and continues west through more forests, eventually turning northwest again. The route comes to an intersection with PA 253 at which point that route turns northwest to join PA 453 on Viola Pike. In the community of Viola, the road intersects PA 153 and continues through more wooded areas with some fields. PA 253/PA 453 turns north and intersects PA 729, at which point it passes between the residential community of Janesville to the west and woodland to the east. The two routes continue north-northeast through more woods with scattered farm fields, becoming Main Street and heading into the borough of Ramey. Here, the road heads northeast past homes, with PA 453 splitting from PA 253 by turning northwest onto Union Street. The route passes through more residential areas of the town before heading into Bigler Township in the community of Beluah and turning southwest to follow Jimmies Hill Road through a mix of farmland and woodland. PA 453 turns north onto Banion Road and heads through wooded areas with some fields and homes. The route comes to the community of Madera and intersects PA 53, turning west to join that route on Main Street and crossing Clearfield Creek.

PA 453 splits from PA 53 by turning northwest onto Belsena Road and winding north through dense forests along the west bank of the Clearfield Creek. The road passes through Belsena Mills and turns northwest away from the creek, crossing into Knox Township. Here, the route comes to Boardman and turns northeast onto Curwensville Tyrone Highway, winding north as it comes to Kellytown. PA 453 curves to the northwest and passes through a mix of farms and woods with some residences. The road heads into more forested areas with a few homes as it crosses the Little Clearfield Creek into Pike Township and passes through Olanta. The route turns north through a mix of woods, fields, and residences and runs through Bloomington. PA 453 heads into wooded areas along the eastern shore of Curwensville Lake and passes near Curwensville Dam before heading into rural developed areas. The road crosses the West Branch Susquehanna River into the borough of Curwensville and becomes Susquehanna Avenue, passing under a R.J. Corman Railroad line and intersecting PA 969. The route heads into residential areas, turning northeast and passing over Anderson Creek and under another R.J. Corman Railroad line. PA 453 becomes Filbert Street and heads into the commercial downtown, ending at PA 879.

== Major intersections ==
County	Location	mi	km	Destinations	Notes
Huntingdon	Morris Township	0.000	0.000	US 22 (William Penn Highway) / Shaffersville Road – Huntingdon, Hollidaysburg, Altoona	Southern terminus
Huntingdon	Morris Township	0.678– 0.752	1.091– 1.210	PA 45 east (Spruce Creek Road) – State College PA 45 Truck begins	Western terminus of PA 45; south end of PA 45 Truck overlap
Blair	No major junctions				
Huntingdon	No major junctions				
Blair	Snyder Township	8.273– 8.289	13.314– 13.340	PA 550 north / PA 45 Truck east – Warriors Mark	Southern terminus of PA 550; north end of PA 45 Truck overlap
Blair	Tyrone	8.941– 9.049	14.389– 14.563	I-99 / US 220 – Altoona, Port Matilda	I-99/US 220 exit 48; access from I-99 northbound via East 10th Street
Blair	Tyrone	9.156	14.735	US 220 Bus. south (Pennsylvania Avenue) / West 11th Street	South end of US 220 Bus. overlap
Blair	Tyrone	9.431	15.178	US 220 Bus. north (Pennsylvania Avenue) / East 14th Street	North end of US 220 Bus. overlap
Clearfield	Gulich Township	20.479	32.958	PA 253 south (Cambria Street) – Glasgow, Allemans	South end of PA 253 overlap
Clearfield	Gulich Township	20.980	33.764	PA 153 north (Ginter Morann Highway) / Viola Mine Road – Ginter, SCI Houtzdale, Houtzdale	Southern terminus of PA 153
Clearfield	Gulich Township	21.903	35.249	PA 729 north (Veterans Street) – Janesville, Beccaria	Southern terminus of PA 729
Clearfield	Ramey	25.066	40.340	PA 253 north (Main Street) / Union Street (SR 2009 – Houtzdale	North end of PA 253 overlap
Clearfield	Bigler Township	29.205	47.001	PA 53 north (Main Street) – Philipsburg	South end of PA 53 overlap
Clearfield	Bigler Township	29.331	47.204	PA 53 south (Main Street) – Coalport	North end of PA 53 overlap
Clearfield	Curwensville	42.814	68.902	PA 969 west (Lumber City Highway) – Mahaffey	Eastern terminus of PA 969
Clearfield	Curwensville	43.756	70.418	PA 879 (State Street) / Filbert Street (SR 3015) – Grampian, Clearfield	Northern terminus
1.000 mi = 1.609 km; 1.000 km = 0.621 mi

== PA 453 Truck ==
Pennsylvania Route 453 Truck
- Location: Clearfield County
- Existed: 2013–2019

Pennsylvania Route 453 Truck was a truck route that bypassed a weight-restricted bridge over Little Clearfield Creek on which trucks over 35 tons and combination loads over 40 tons were prohibited. The route followed PA 879, PA 153, and PA 53 through Clearfield County, Pennsylvania. PA 453 Truck was signed to its alignment in 2013. The bridge was completely reconstructed in 2019, effectively deleting the route.
