= Pennsylvania Route 53 =

State highway in Pennsylvania, US

Pennsylvania Route 53

Route information
- Maintained by PennDOT
- Length: 83.104 mi (133.743 km)

Major junctions
- South end: US 219 near Summerhill
- US 22 near Cresson; US 322 in Philipsburg; I-80 in Kylertown
- North end: PA 144 in Snow Shoe Township

Location
- Country: United States
- State: Pennsylvania
- Counties: Cambria, Clearfield, Centre

Highway system
- Pennsylvania State Route System; Interstate; US; State; Scenic; Legislative
← PA 52	→ PA 54

Pennsylvania Route 53 (PA 53) is an 83-mile-long (134 km) state highway located in central Pennsylvania. The southern terminus of the route is at U.S. Route 219 (US 219) near the borough of Summerhill. The northern terminus is at PA 144 in the Snow Shoe Township community of Moshannon.

== Route description ==
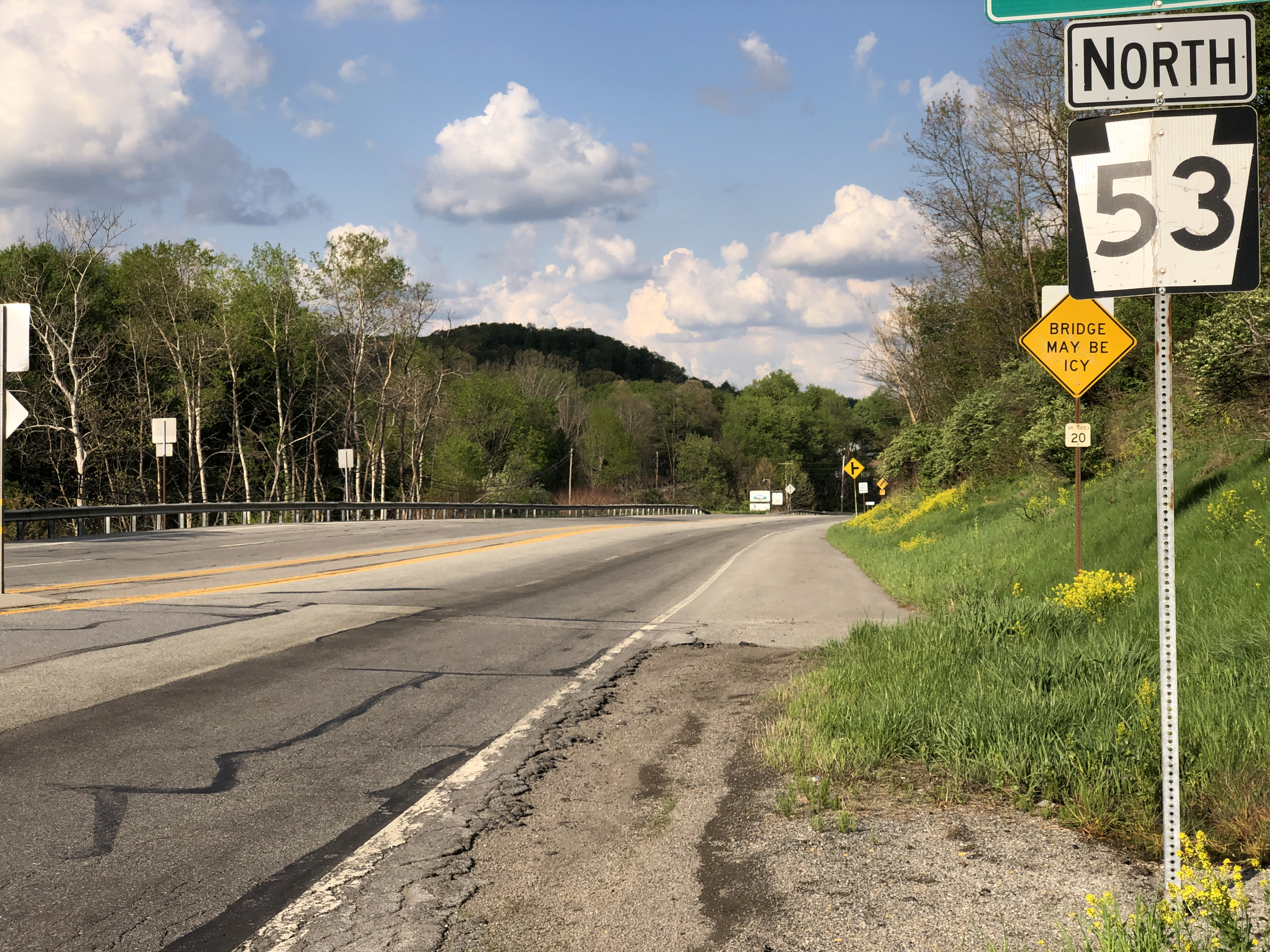
PA 53 northbound past US 219 in Croyle Township

=== Cambria County ===
PA 53 begins at an interchange with the US 219 freeway in Croyle Township, Cambria County, heading east-northeast on four-lane divided Railroad Street. The road narrows into a two-lane undivided road as it heads through wooded areas to the south of Norfolk Southern's Pittsburgh Line, crossing the Little Conemaugh River into the borough of Summerhill. The route passes homes and a few businesses, heading northeast and crossing the river again before curving east and crossing back into Croyle Township. PA 53 becomes Portage Street and runs through more woodland to the south of the railroad tracks, crossing the Little Conemaugh River twice. The road heads into Summerhill Township and heads across the river again as it passes through farm fields and turns to the north, becoming the border between Summerhill Township to the west and the borough of Wilmore to the east. The route heads into wooded areas again and crosses under the Pittsburgh Line, turning northeast to fully enter Wilmore and pass near residences. PA 53 intersects PA 160 and passes homes and businesses before heading back into Summerhill Township. Here, the road runs through wooded areas with a few residences, crossing into Portage Township. The route becomes the border between Portage Township to the north and the borough of Portage to the south as it heads into commercial areas, gaining a center left-turn lane. PA 53 intersects PA 164 and forms a short concurrency with that route, fully entering Portage Township before PA 164 splits to the north. The road becomes two lanes again and heads northeast into woods, turning to the southeast as it passes through the residential community of Jamestown. The route heads into woods again and crosses under the Pittsburgh Line, turning north and crossing the former Bens Creek Culvert of the Allegheny Portage Railroad before entering Washington Township. PA 53 winds northeast through more woodland with some homes, passing through Plane Bank before heading into the borough of Lilly. Here, the route heads into residential areas, crossing the former Lilly Culvert of the Allegheny Portage Railroad before turning west onto Cleveland Street and then turning north onto Main Street. PA 53 splits northwest onto Evergreen Street and curves to the north, crossing back into Washington Township. The road heads into woodland, curving northeast and continuing into Cresson Township, becoming West 2nd Street. The route widens into a divided highway as it comes to an interchange with the US 22 freeway.

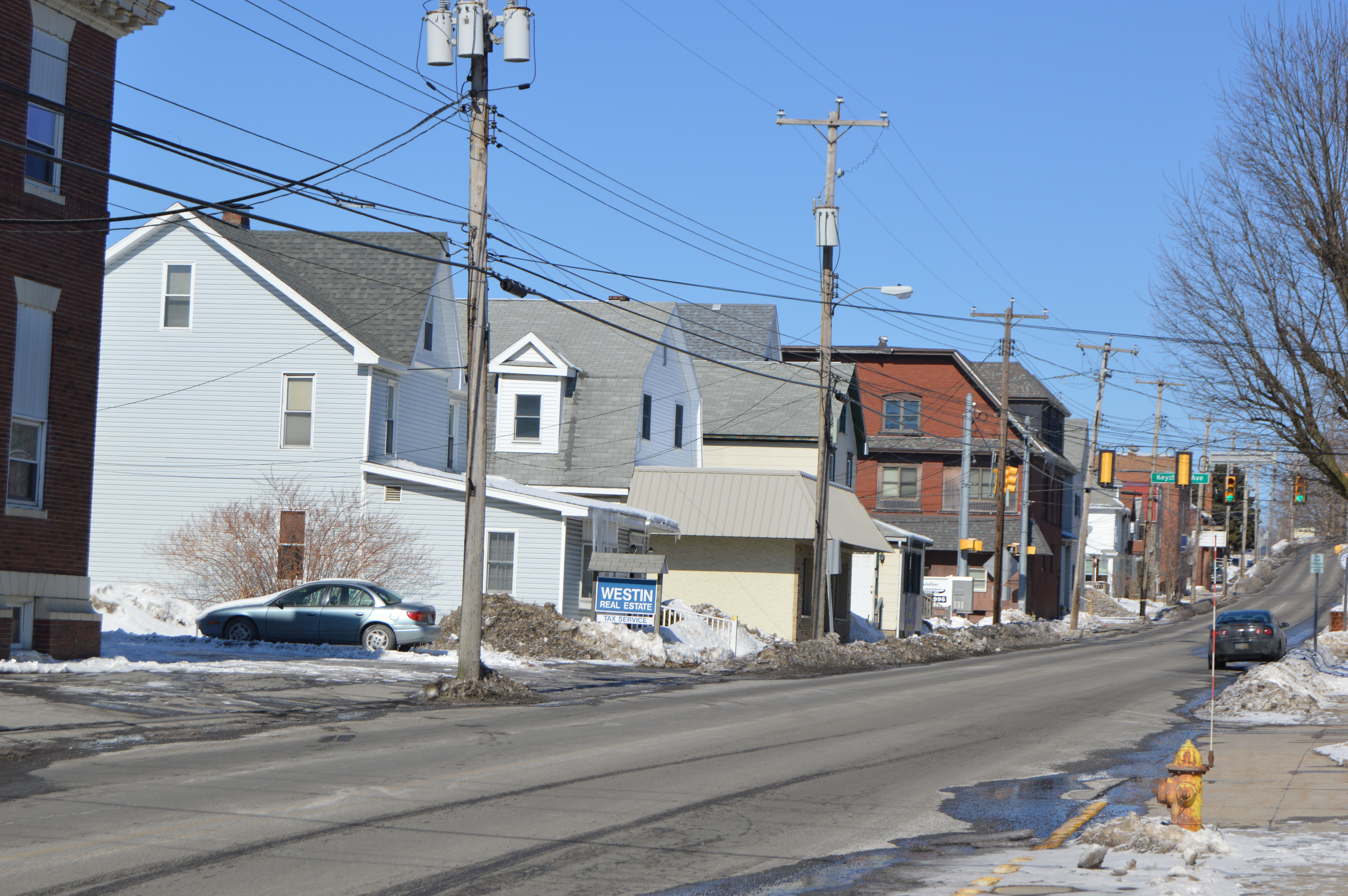
PA 53 in Cresson

PA 53 heads into residential areas as a two-lane undivided road and crosses into the borough of Cresson at the Admiral Peary Highway intersection. Here, the road becomes 2nd Street and passes through commercial areas. The route passes through residential areas before crossing back into Cresson Township and becoming Gallitzin Road, passing through more developed areas. PA 53 turns northeast and heads into Gallitzin Township, passing over the Norfolk Southern line and heading through woods, curving north. The road heads northwest through more forests, crossing a R.J. Corman Railroad line and passing through Syberton. The route winds north-northeast through more rural areas with occasional homes a short distance to the west of the railroad tracks, running through Amsbry. PA 53 continues into the borough of Ashville and becomes West Main Street, passing homes as it comes to an intersection with PA 36. At this point, the route turns southeast to join that route on Liberty Street, passing residences and businesses as it crosses the R.J. Corman Railroad line. PA 53 splits from PA 36 by turning northeast onto Clearfield Valley Boulevard, crossing into Dean Township and heading through forested areas with some homes to the southeast of the railroad tracks and Clearfield Creek. The road passes through Dysart before turning north-northeast and running through Tippletown and Dean. The route crosses into Reade Township and becomes Glendale Valley Boulevard, running through more forests with sparse fields and residences and turning northwest through Frugality before heading north again. In Van Ormer, PA 53 intersects the southern terminus of PA 253 and continues north-northwest through more rural areas, passing through Fallen Timber. The road continues northwest through wooded areas with some fields and homes, with the railroad line following the road ending before it heads through Flinton.

=== Clearfield and Centre counties ===
PA 53 enters Beccaria Township in Clearfield County and becomes North Glendale Boulevard, heading north through more forests to the east of Clearfield Creek. The road intersects the northern terminus of PA 865, where it crosses into the borough of Coalport and becomes Main Street, passing homes and businesses. The route heads back into Beccaria Township and continues into the community of Blain City, turning east and north along Dorsey Avenue. PA 53 heads northwest through wooded areas with some fields and homes, crossing into the borough of Irvona. The road crosses Clearfield Creek and runs north through residential and commercial areas before turning east. The route reenters Beccaria Township and becomes Glen Hope Boulevard, heading into forested areas with some homes and turning north. PA 53 turns east and north again through more woods with some fields and residences, continuing into the borough of Glen Hope. The road heads northeast into residential areas, crossing PA 729. The route heads back into rural areas and crosses into Bigler Township, becoming Main Street and continuing to the northwest of Clearfield Creek. PA 53 comes to an intersection with PA 453 and forms a concurrency with that route, crossing the creek and heading into the residential community of Madera, where PA 453 splits to the south.

The road heads east into farmland with some woods and homes, becoming Green Acre Road and passing through Amesville. The route continues into Woodward Township and becomes West Hannah Street, passing homes. PA 53 enters the borough of Houtzdale and heads southeast on Hannah Street, turning south onto McAteer Street as it continues through residential areas. At an intersection with the northern terminus of PA 253, the route turns east onto Elizabeth Street and comes to a junction with PA 153 near some businesses. PA 53 curves northeast onto Spring Street and passes through residential areas. The road crosses back into Woodward Township and passes a few commercial establishments near Sterling. The route heads into Decatur Township and runs through wooded areas with some homes, passing through Beaverton. In Coal Run Junction, PA 53 becomes Sarah Street and heads east through rural areas of commercial development to the north of a R.J. Corman Railroad line before crossing into the borough of Osceola Mills. Here, the route heads east-southeast into residential areas, turning north-northeast onto Stone Street. The road turns northeast and heads back into Decatur Township, becoming Walton Street and passing through wooded areas with some fields and homes. PA 53 runs through more woodland with some residences, passing through New Liberty and Hudson before crossing into the borough of Chester Hill. In this area, the road passes homes and businesses.

PA 53 crosses the Moshannon Creek into the borough of Philipsburg in Centre County and becomes West Maple Street, crossing a R.J. Corman Railroad line before turning northwest onto South Front Street as it passes homes. The route turns northeast onto East Presqueisle Street and heading into the commercial downtown of Phillipsburg. PA 53 comes to the square in the center of town, at which point PA 350 heads south on South Centre Street, PA 504 heads east on East Presqueisle Street, and PA 53 briefly turns northwest onto a one-way pair that soon becomes two-lane, two-way north Centre Street, passing homes. The road heads into business areas and gains a center-left turn lane, becoming the border between Phillipsburg to the west and Rush Township to the east. The route comes to an intersection with US 322, at which point that route turns northwest to form a concurrency with PA 53 on a three-lane road with two southbound lanes and one northbound lane, passing homes and businesses.

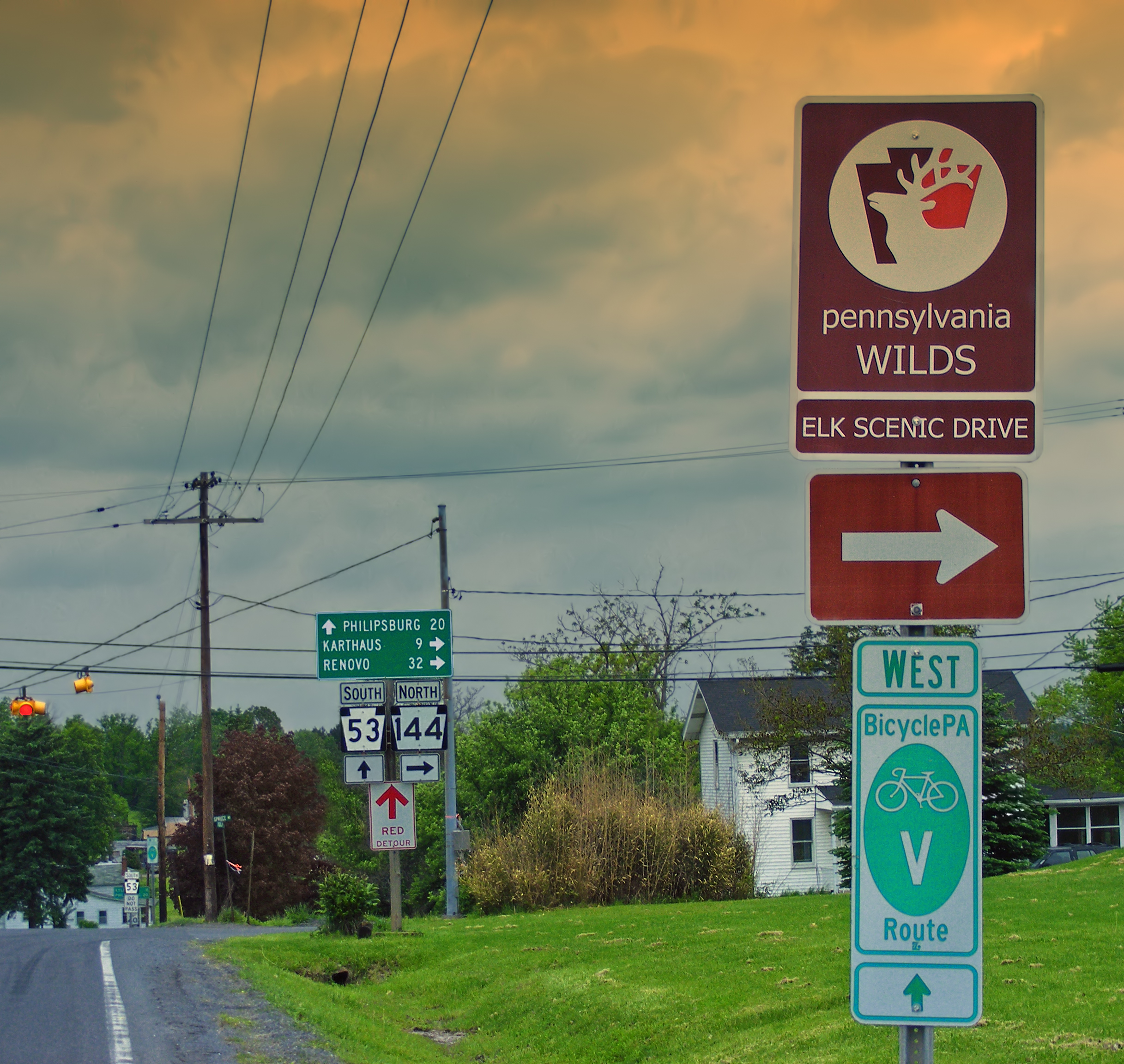
Looking west towards PA 53's northern terminus

The road crosses the Moshannon Creek back into Decatur Township in Clearfield County, where PA 53 splits from US 322 by heading north-northeast on two-lane Troy Hawk Run Highway. The route heads into Morris Township and runs through wooded areas with some homes to the northwest of the creek, passing through Troy. PA 53 curves to the north away from the creek and heads through more rural areas, heading northwest as Morrisdale Allport Highway. The road turns north again and comes to the residential community of Morrisdale, where it curves northeast into a mix of farmland and woodland with some homes. The route passes through Oak Grove before heading more to the north and running through Allport. PA 53 heads through more rural areas and turns east onto Kylertown Drifting Highway, continuing northeast and crossing into Cooper Township, where it reaches an interchange with I-80 near Kylertown. Past this interchange, the road turns east through more areas of farms and woods with occasional residences, turning north and passing through Drain Lick. The route curves northeast and comes to Drifting, where it heads north again. PA 53 passes through Cooper Settlement before turning east and running into more forested areas. The route crosses the Moshannon Creek into Snow Shoe Township in Centre County and becomes Elm Road, heading through more forests before ending at an intersection with PA 144 in the community of Moshannon. At this point, the road continues east as part of PA 144.

== Major intersections ==
County	Location	mi	km	Destinations	Notes
Cambria	Croyle Township	0.000– 0.044	0.000– 0.071	US 219 / Railroad Street (SR 3024) – Ebensburg, Johnstown, South Fork	Interchange, southern terminus of PA 53
Cambria	Wilmore	3.461	5.570	PA 160 (Main Street / Evergreen Street)	
Cambria	Portage	6.145	9.889	PA 164 south (Main Street) – Blue Knob	Southern end of PA 164 concurrency
Cambria	Portage Township	6.317	10.166	PA 164 north (Munster Road) – Ebensburg	Northern end of PA 164 concurrency
Cambria	Cresson Township	12.550– 12.951	20.197– 20.843	US 22 – Altoona, Ebensburg	Interchange
Cambria	Ashville	22.294	35.879	PA 36 north (Liberty Street) – Patton	Southern end of PA 36 concurrency
Cambria	Ashville	22.448	36.127	PA 36 south (Liberty Street) / Market Street	Northern end of PA 36 concurrency
Cambria	Reade Township	31.959	51.433	PA 253 north (Executive Drive) – Houtzdale	Southern terminus of PA 253
Clearfield	Coalport	37.276	59.990	PA 865 south (Heverly Boulevard) – Utahville	Northern terminus of PA 865
Clearfield	Glen Hope	43.970	70.763	PA 729 (Tyrone Pike) – Ansonville, Beccaria, Janesville	
Clearfield	Bigler Township	48.242	77.638	PA 453 north (Belsena Road) – Curwensville	Southern end of PA 453 concurrency
Clearfield	Bigler Township	48.368	77.841	PA 453 south (Banion Road) – Tyrone	Northern end of PA 453 concurrency
Clearfield	Houtzdale	53.175	85.577	PA 253 south (Elizabeth Street) / McAteer Street – Ramey	Northern terminus of PA 253
Clearfield	Houtzdale	53.402	85.942	PA 153 (Brisbin Street) – Brisbin, Clearfield, Morann	
Centre	Philipsburg	62.768– 62.794	101.015– 101.057	PA 350 south (South Centre Street) to I-99 south – Sandy Ridge, Tyrone PA 504 east (East Presqueisle Street) to US 322 east – State College	Northern terminus of PA 350; western terminus of PA 504
Centre	Philipsburg	63.247	101.786	US 322 east (Railroad Street) – State College	Southern end of US 322 concurrency
Clearfield	Decatur Township	63.495	102.185	US 322 west (Front Street) – Clearfield	Northern end of US 322 concurrency
Clearfield	Cooper Township	71.558– 71.708	115.161– 115.403	I-80 – Bellefonte, DuBois	Exit 133 (I-80)
Centre	Snow Shoe Township	83.104	133.743	PA 144 (Spruce Road / Sycamore Road) / Gorton Road – Snow Shoe, Karthaus, Renovo	Northern terminus of PA 53
1.000 mi = 1.609 km; 1.000 km = 0.621 mi: Concurrency terminus
