= Pennsylvania Route 253 =

State highway in Pennsylvania, US

Pennsylvania Route 253

Route information
- Maintained by PennDOT
- Length: 15.958 mi (25.682 km)

Major junctions
- South end: PA 53 in Van Ormer
- PA 865 in Reade Township; PA 453 from Gulich Township to Ramey; PA 153 in Gulich Township; PA 729 in Gulich Township
- North end: PA 53 in Houtzdale

Location
- Country: United States
- State: Pennsylvania
- Counties: Cambria, Clearfield

Highway system
- Pennsylvania State Route System; Interstate; US; State; Scenic; Legislative
← PA 252	→ PA 254

Pennsylvania Route 253 (PA 253) is a 16.0-mile-long (25.7 km) state highway located in Cambria and Clearfield counties in Pennsylvania. The southern terminus is at PA 53 in Van Ormer. The northern terminus is at PA 53 in Houtzdale.

== Route description ==
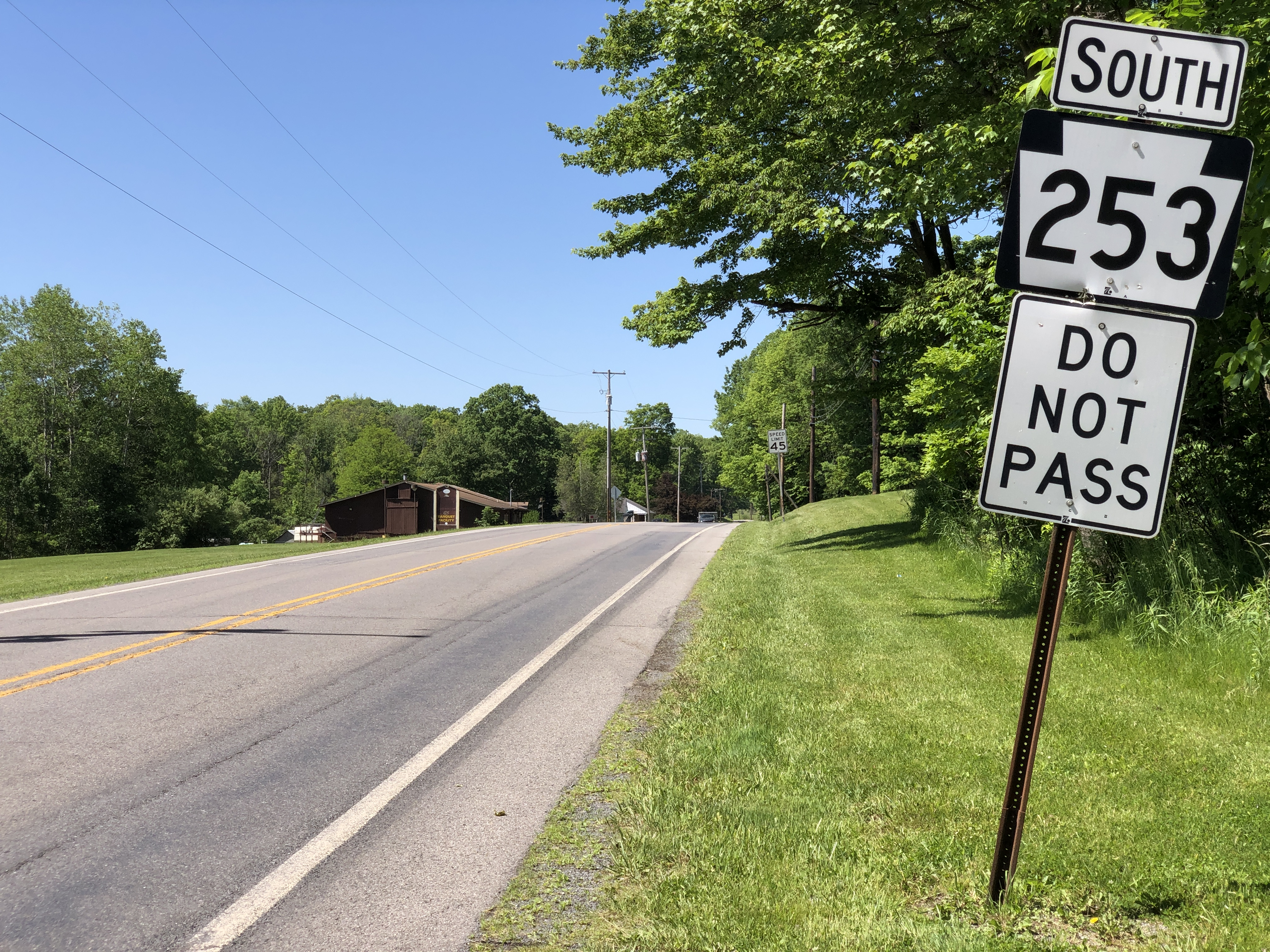
PA 253 southbound in Woodward Township

PA 253 begins at an intersection with PA 53 in the community of Van Ormer in Reade Township, Cambria County, heading east-northeast on two-lane undivided Executive Drive. The road heads through forested areas, turning northeast and passing through the residential community of Hollentown. The route runs through more wooded areas with some fields and homes, coming to an intersection with PA 865 in the community of Glasgow. At this point, PA 253 turns northwest to form a concurrency with PA 865 on Skyline Drive, passing a few homes. PA 253 splits from PA 865 by turning east onto Executive Drive, continuing through a mix of farmland and woodland with occasional development. The route turns northeast into more wooded areas with a few fields.

PA 253 enters Gulich Township in Clearfield County and becomes Cambria Street, passing homes in the community of Allemans before turning north into dense forests. The route comes to an intersection with PA 453 and turns northwest to join that route on Viola Pike. In the community of Viola, the road intersects the southern terminus of PA 153 and continues through more wooded areas with some fields. PA 253/PA 453 turns north and intersects the southern terminus of PA 729, at which point it passes between the residential community of Janesville to the west and woodland to the east. The two routes continue north-northeast through more woods with scattered farm fields, becoming Main Street and heading into the borough of Ramey. Here, the road heads northeast past homes, with PA 453 splitting from PA 253 by turning northwest onto Union Street. PA 253 runs through more residential areas, turning northwest onto Beluah Street before heading northeast onto Miriam Street. The road heads back into Gulich Township and enters forests with some fields, continuing into Woodward Township. Here, the route becomes 4th Avenue and passes through the community of Kendrick, passing farm fields before heading into wooded areas with some homes and turning to the east. PA 253 heads into the borough of Houtzdale and becomes Elizabeth Street, ending at another intersection with PA 53. At this point, Elizabeth Street continues east as PA 53.

== Major intersections ==
County	Location	mi	km	Destinations	Notes
Cambria	Reade Township	0.000	0.000	PA 53 (Glendale Valley Boulevard) – Ashville, Coalport	Southern terminus
Cambria	Reade Township	3.312	5.330	PA 865 south (Skyline Drive) – Bellwood	South end of PA 865 concurrency
Cambria	Reade Township	3.716	5.980	PA 865 north (Skyline Drive) – Utahville	North end of PA 865 concurrency
Clearfield	Gulich Township	8.169	13.147	PA 453 south – Tyrone	South end of PA 453 concurrency
Clearfield	Gulich Township	8.670	13.953	PA 153 north – Ginter, SCI Houtzdale, Houtzdale	Southern terminus of PA 153
Clearfield	Gulich Township	9.593	15.438	PA 729 north – Janesville, Beccaria	Southern terminus of PA 729
Clearfield	Ramey	12.756	20.529	PA 453 north (Union Street) – Curwensville	North end of PA 453 concurrency
Clearfield	Houtzdale	15.957	25.680	PA 53 (McAteer Street / Elizabeth Street) – Coalport, Philipsburg	Northern terminus
1.000 mi = 1.609 km; 1.000 km = 0.621 mi: Concurrency terminus
