= Pennsylvania Route 153 =

State highway in Pennsylvania, US

Pennsylvania Route 153

Route information
- Maintained by PennDOT
- Length: 48.7 mi (78.4 km)

Major junctions
- South end: PA 253 / PA 453 near Viola
- PA 53 in Houtzdale; PA 879 in Clearfield; US 322 from Clearfield to Pine Township; I-80 in Pine Township; PA 255 in Huston Township
- North end: US 219 near Brockport

Location
- Country: United States
- State: Pennsylvania
- Counties: Clearfield, Elk

Highway system
- Pennsylvania State Route System; Interstate; US; State; Scenic; Legislative
← PA 152	→ PA 154

Pennsylvania Route 153 (PA 153) is a 48.7-mile-long (78.4 km) state highway located in Clearfield and Elk counties in Pennsylvania. The southern terminus is at PA 253/PA 453 near Viola. The northern terminus is at U.S. Route 219 (US 219) near Brockport.

== Route description ==
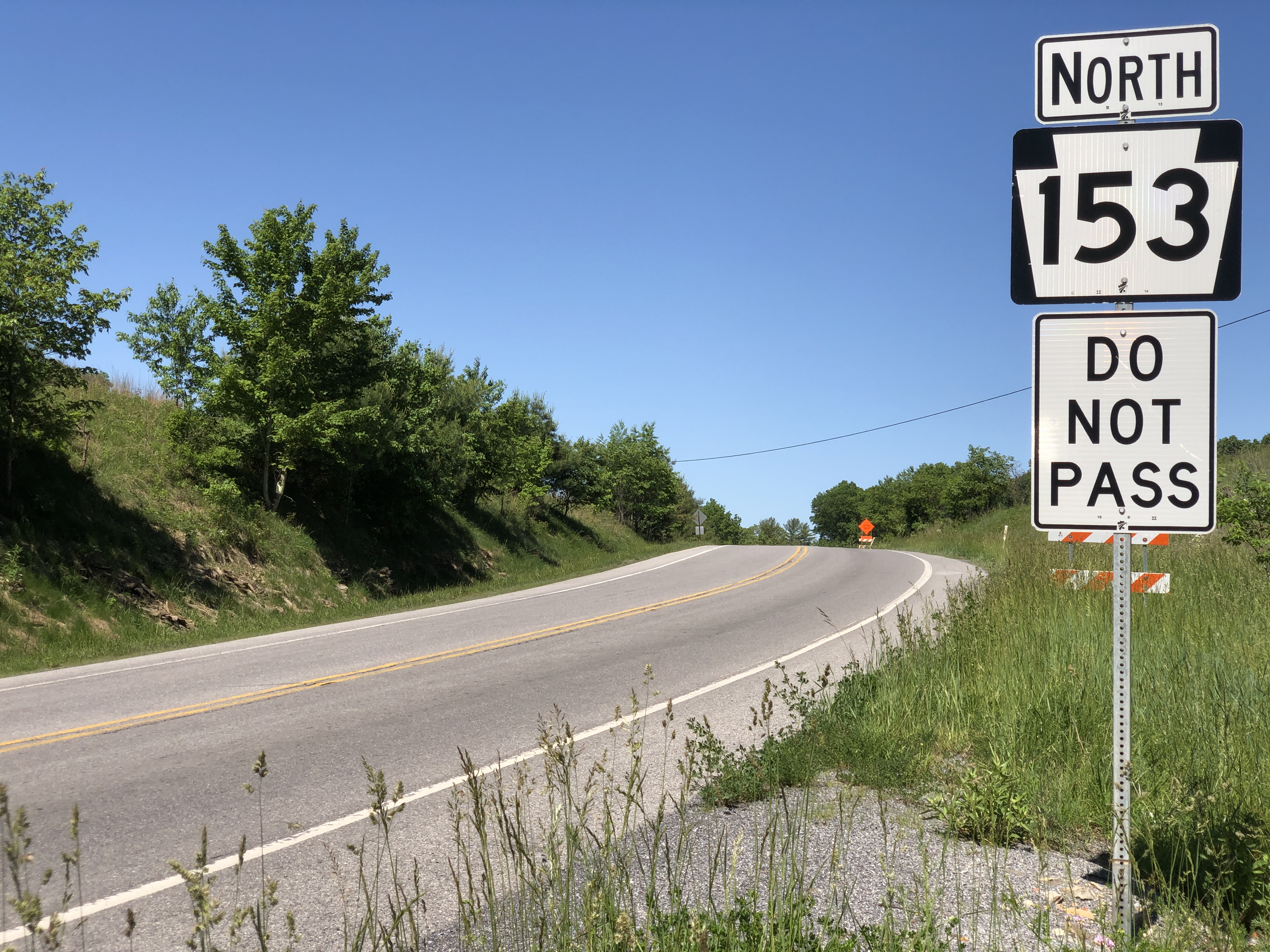
PA 153 northbound in Boggs Township

PA 153 begins at an intersection with PA 253/PA 453 in the community of Viola in Gulich Township, Clearfield County, heading northeast on two-lane undivided Ginter Morann Highway. The road heads through forests before continuing through a mix of farmland and woodland with some homes, passing through Ginter and Morann. The route continues into Woodward Township and becomes Morann Avenue, turning north through wooded areas with some fields and homes, passing to the east of State Correctional Institution – Houtzdale. PA 153 enters the borough of Houtzdale and becomes Brisbin Street, passing homes and coming to an intersection with PA 53. From here, the road passes a few businesses before running through more residential areas. The route passes through a small wooded area of Woodward Township before crossing into the borough of Brisbin and becoming Teutonic Avenue, passing more homes and heading northeast. PA 153 turns northwest onto Swoop Street and is lined with more residences. The road heads back into Woodward Township and becomes Henderson Street, heading north through forests before turning northwest into a mix of farmland and woodland with some homes. In the community of Henderson, the route turns north onto Crooked Sewer Road and passes through wooded areas, eventually becoming the border between Woodward Township to the west and Decatur Township to the east. The road makes a jog east into Decatur Township before resuming along the border again.

PA 153 heads into a mix of farms and woods with some homes, heading north-northeast into Decatur Township and passing to the east of Jeffries. The route continues north through more woodland with patches of fields, crossing into Boggs Township. The road continues through forests and turns west onto Old Erie Pike, passing through a few fields. PA 153 heads northwest onto Krebs Highway and passes through woodland with occasional farms and homes. The route crosses Clearfield Creek into Lawrence Township and passes through more rural areas. The road becomes Park Avenue Extension and comes to an interchange with PA 879, at which point it heads into the borough of Clearfield and passes homes along with a few businesses.

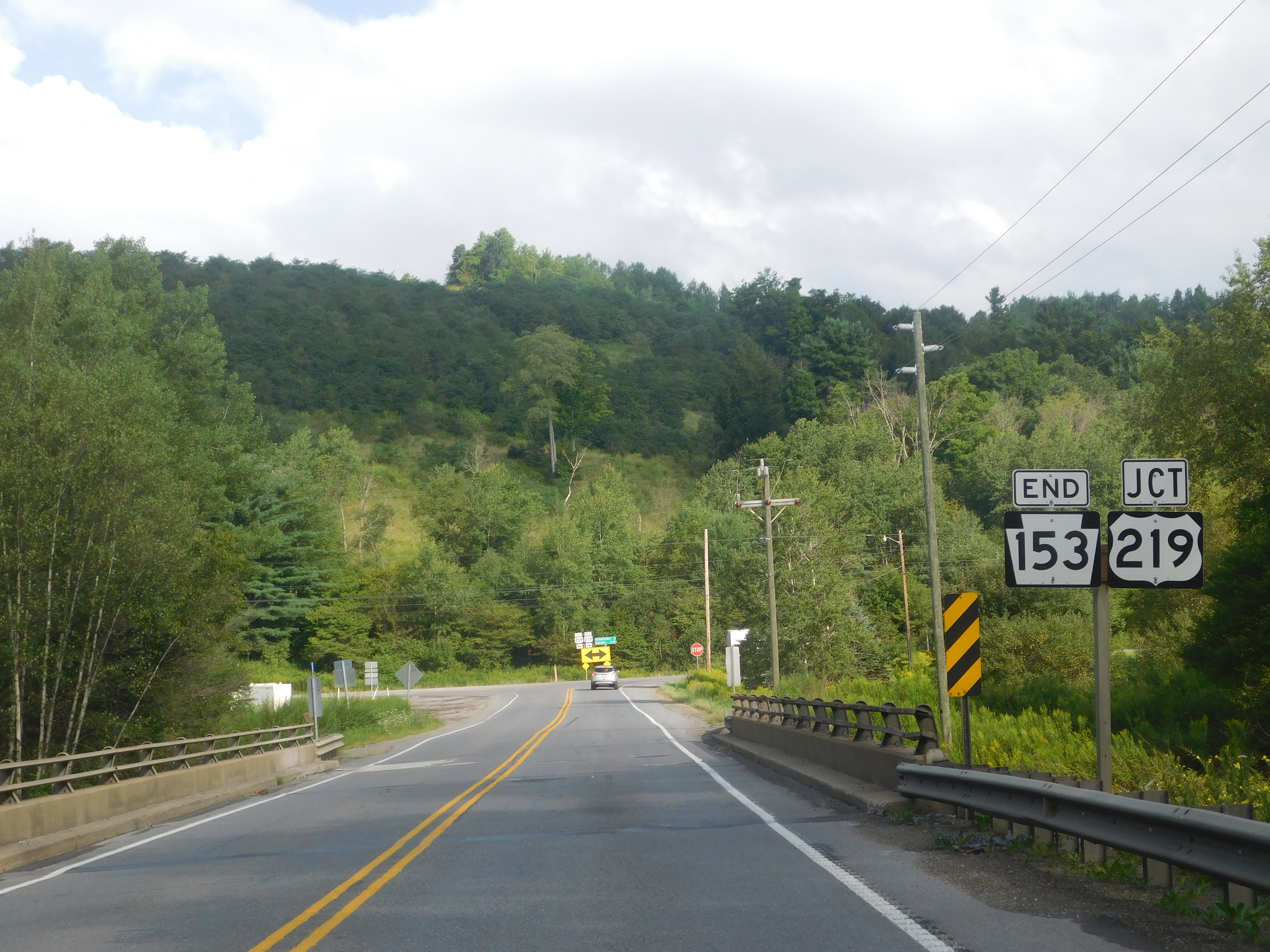
PA 153 northbound approaching northern terminus at US 219 in Helen Mills

PA 153 turns north onto South 2nd Street and runs along the eastern bank of the West Branch Susquehanna River before heading into the commercial downtown of Clearfield, splitting into a one-way pair that follows one-way, two-lane South 2nd Street northbound and South Front Street southbound. At the intersection with Market Street, the one-way pair becomes North 2nd Street northbound and North Front Street southbound, with the two roads rejoining at an intersection with US 322. Here, PA 153 turns northwest to form a concurrency with US 322 on two-way, two-lane Bridge Street, crossing the West Branch Susquehanna River and becoming Nichols Street. The two routes turn north onto West Front Street, a three-lane road with a center left-turn lane, and pass through residential and commercial areas. The road heads back into Lawrence Township and turns northwest, crossing a R.J. Corman Railroad line.

US 322/PA 153 becomes four-lane divided Rockton Mountain Highway and passes more development along with some woods. The road continues into more forested areas and heads into Pine Township, at which point it enters the Moshannon State Forest. PA 153 splits from US 322 by continuing northwest along State Park Road, becoming two lanes and undivided. The road turns to the north and widens back into a four-lane divided highway as it comes to an interchange with I-80. Past this, the route passes to the west of S. B. Elliott State Park and narrows back into a two-lane undivided road, continuing through more of the state forest. PA 153 passes through Anderson Creek and heads into Huston Township, passing a few fields before continuing through the Moshannon State Forest. The road turns to the northwest and heads into the residential community of Penfield, where it crosses PA 255. From here, the route becomes Hoovertown Road and continues through forests with occasional agricultural clearings and residences, passing through Hoovertown. Farther northwest, PA 153 passes through more of the Moshannon State Forest.

PA 153 enters Fox Township in Elk County and becomes Penfield Road, turning west and passing through the Elk State Forest. The route heads into Horton Township and turns northwest, passing through more forested areas with occasional farmland and homes before ending at US 219.

== Major intersections ==
County	Location	mi	km	Destinations	Notes
Clearfield	Gulich Township	0.000	0.000	PA 253 / PA 453 (Viola Pike) – Janesville, Ramey, Curwensville	Southern terminus
Clearfield	Houtzdale	5.907	9.506	PA 53 (Elizabeth Street) – Philipsburg, Coalport	
Clearfield	Lawrence Township	22.068	35.515	PA 879 (Clearfield Shawville Highway) – Curwensville, Karthaus	
Clearfield	Clearfield	23.398	37.655	US 322 east (Bridge Street) – Philipsburg	Southern end of concurrency with US 322
Clearfield	Pine Township	29.598	47.633	US 322 west (Rockton Mountain Highway) – Rockton, Luthersburg	Northern end of concurrency with US 322
Clearfield	Pine Township	32.054	51.586	I-80 – Bellefonte, DuBois	Exit 111 on I-80
Clearfield	Huston Township	40.016	64.400	PA 255 (Bennetts Valley Highway)	
Elk	Horton Township	48.984	78.832	US 219 – Ridgway, Brockway	Northern terminus
1.000 mi = 1.609 km; 1.000 km = 0.621 mi: Concurrency terminus
