= Pennsylvania State Game Lands Number 33 =

Park in the United States

- Location within Pennsylvania Location within the United States
- Location: Centre County
- Coordinates: 40°49′38″N 78°10′41″W
- Area: 17,583 acres (7,116 ha)
- Elevation: 2,198 feet (670 m)
- Max. elevation: 2,541 feet (774 m)
- Min. elevation: 1,460 feet (450 m)
- Owner: Pennsylvania Game Commission

The Pennsylvania State Game Lands Number 33 are Pennsylvania State Game Lands in Centre County in Pennsylvania in the United States providing hunting, bird watching, and other activities.

== Geography ==
State Game Lands Number 33 is located in Rush, Taylor and Worth Townships in Centre County. Nearby communities include the Boroughs of Philipsburg and Chester Hill, census-designated places Hawk Run, North Philipsburg, Sandy Ridge and South Philipsburg, as well as unincorporated communities Bald Eagle, Coaldale, Cuba Mines, Edendale, Flat Rock, Gardner, Gearhartville, Glass City, Hudson, Loch Lomond Junction, New Liberty, New Town, Penn Five, Pleasant Hill, Spike Island, Stumptown, Troy and Victor.

Highways passing nearby or through SGL 33 include Interstate 99, U.S. Routes 220 and 322, as well as Pennsylvania Routes 53, 153, 350, 504, 550 and 970.

Sandy Ridge (summit elevation 2,541 feet (774 m)) runs along the southeast border of SGL33, Pine Hill (summit elevation 2,106 feet (642 m)) is in the northeast portion, other landforms include Cabbage Hollow, Crows Nest Hollow, Horse Hollow, Pool Hollow.

The watershed of the southeast portion of SGL 33 includes Big Fill Run, Bright Run, Laurel Run, Reese Hollow Run, Sparrow Run, Vanscoyoc Run and Wold Run all which drain to Bald Eagle Creek, Little Juniata River and Juniata River. The northeast portion includes Black Bear Run, Cabbage Hollow Run, Cold Stream, Hawk Run, Sixmile Run, Tomtit Run and Trout Run, all which drain to Moshannon Creek and the West Branch Susquehanna River. All are part of the Susquehanna River watershed.

Protected areas in Pennsylvania within 30 miles of SGL 33 include:

=== State Parks ===
- Black Moshannon State Park
- Canoe Creek State Park
- Greenwood Furnace State Park
- Prince Gallitzin State Park
- S. B. Elliott State Park
- Whipple Dam State Park

=== State Forests ===
- Bald Eagle State Forest
- Rothrock State Forest
- Sproul State Forest

=== Recreational Areas ===
- Stone Valley Recreation Area

=== Pennsylvania State Game Lands ===
- Pennsylvania State Game Lands Number 34
- Pennsylvania State Game Lands Number 60
- Pennsylvania State Game Lands Number 78
- Pennsylvania State Game Lands Number 87
- Pennsylvania State Game Lands Number 90
- Pennsylvania State Game Lands Number 92
- Pennsylvania State Game Lands Number 94
- Pennsylvania State Game Lands Number 98
- Pennsylvania State Game Lands Number 100
- Pennsylvania State Game Lands Number 103
- Pennsylvania State Game Lands Number 108
- Pennsylvania State Game Lands Number 112
- Pennsylvania State Game Lands Number 118
- Pennsylvania State Game Lands Number 120
- Pennsylvania State Game Lands Number 131
- Pennsylvania State Game Lands Number 147
- Pennsylvania State Game Lands Number 158
- Pennsylvania State Game Lands Number 166
- Pennsylvania State Game Lands Number 176
- Pennsylvania State Game Lands Number 184
- Pennsylvania State Game Lands Number 198
- Pennsylvania State Game Lands Number 278
- Pennsylvania State Game Lands Number 321
- Pennsylvania State Game Lands Number 322
- Pennsylvania State Game Lands Number 323
- Pennsylvania State Game Lands Number 333

== Statistics ==
Elevations range from 1,460 feet (450 m) to 2,541 feet (774 m), consisting of a single parcel of 17,583 acres (7,116 ha) located at 40°49′38″N 78°10′41″W.

== Biology ==
The most prevalent game species include bear (Ursus americanus), deer (Odocoileus virginianus), Ruffed grouse (Bonasa umbellus) and turkey (Meleagris vison).

== See also ==
Pennsylvania State Game Lands
