= Viola, Pennsylvania =

Unincorporated community in Pennsylvania, US

- Unincorporated community
- Location within Pennsylvania
- Coordinates: 40°45′08″N 78°24′04″W
- Country: United States
- State: Pennsylvania
- County: Clearfield
- Township: Gulich
- Elevation: 1,640 ft (500 m)
- Time zone: UTC-5 (Eastern (EST))
  - Summer (DST): UTC-4 (EDT)
- Area code: 814
- GNIS feature ID: 1213019

Viola is an unincorporated community in Gulich Township, Clearfield County, Pennsylvania, United States. The community is located at the intersection of state routes 153, 253 and 453, 5.7 miles (9.2 km) south-southwest of Houtzdale.
