= Drifting, Pennsylvania =

Unincorporated community in Pennsylvania, US

- Unincorporated community
- Location within Pennsylvania
- Coordinates: 41°01′27″N 78°06′30″W
- Country: United States
- State: Pennsylvania
- County: Clearfield
- Elevation: 1,608 ft (490 m)
- Time zone: UTC-5 (Eastern (EST))
  - Summer (DST): UTC-4 (EDT)
- ZIP code: 16834
- Area code: 814
- GNIS feature ID: 1173479

Drifting is an unincorporated community in Cooper Township, Clearfield County, Pennsylvania, United States. The community is located along Pennsylvania Route 53, 8.3 miles (13.4 km) west of Snow Shoe. Drifting has a post office with ZIP code 16834, which opened on December 6, 1895.

== Demographics ==
Historical population
Census	Pop.	Note	%±

The United States Census Bureau first defined Drifting as a census designated place in 2023.
