= Moshannon Valley School District =

School district in Pennsylvania

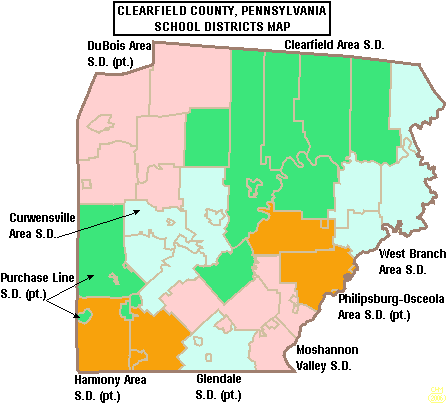

Address
- 4934 Green Acre Road Houtzdale, Pennsylvania, 16651; United States

District information
- Type: Public
- Grades: K-12
- Established: 1955

Students and staff
- Athletic conference: PIAA District 6 (Inter-County Conference)
- District mascot: Black Knights
- Colors: Black, White and Gold

Other information
- Website: http://movalley.org/

The Moshannon Valley School District is a diminutive, rural public school district in Clearfield County, Pennsylvania. It serves the boroughs of Houtzdale, Brisbin, Ramey, and Glen Hope plus the townships of Gulich, Jordan, Bigler, and Woodward. Moshannon Valley School District encompasses approximately 148 square miles. According to 2000 federal census data, it serves a resident population of 8,764. In 2009, the district residents’ per capita income was $13,356, while the median family income was $34,882. In the Commonwealth, the median family income was $49,501 and the United States median family income was $49,445, in 2010.

In its 2024 school district rankings, the U.S. News & World Report ranked the school second among high schools in Clearfield County.[3]

== Administration ==
Brandy O'Hare is the Superintendent of Moshannon Valley School District, having started her role on November 1, 2025. Key administrative staff also include High School Principal Kristofer Albright and Elementary School Principal Shawn Kopp.

== Schools ==
- Moshannon Valley Elementary School- Grades K-6
  5026 Green Acre Road
  Houtzdale, Pennsylvania 16651
- Moshannon Valley Junior/Senior High School - Grades 7-12
  4934 Green Acre Road
  Houtzdale, Pennsylvania 16651

== Extracurriculars ==
The district offers a variety of clubs, activities, and sports.

=== Athletics ===
Athletic Director: Thomas Webb

Website - https://www.movalleyathletics.org/

=== Boys Athletics ===
- Baseball - Class A
- Basketball - Class AA
- Football - Class A
- Wrestling - Class A

=== Girls Athletics ===
- Basketball - Class A
- Soccer - Class AA (Merged with Curwensville Area School District)
- Softball - Class A
- Volleyball - Class A
