= Madera, Pennsylvania =

Unincorporated community in Pennsylvania, US

- Unincorporated community
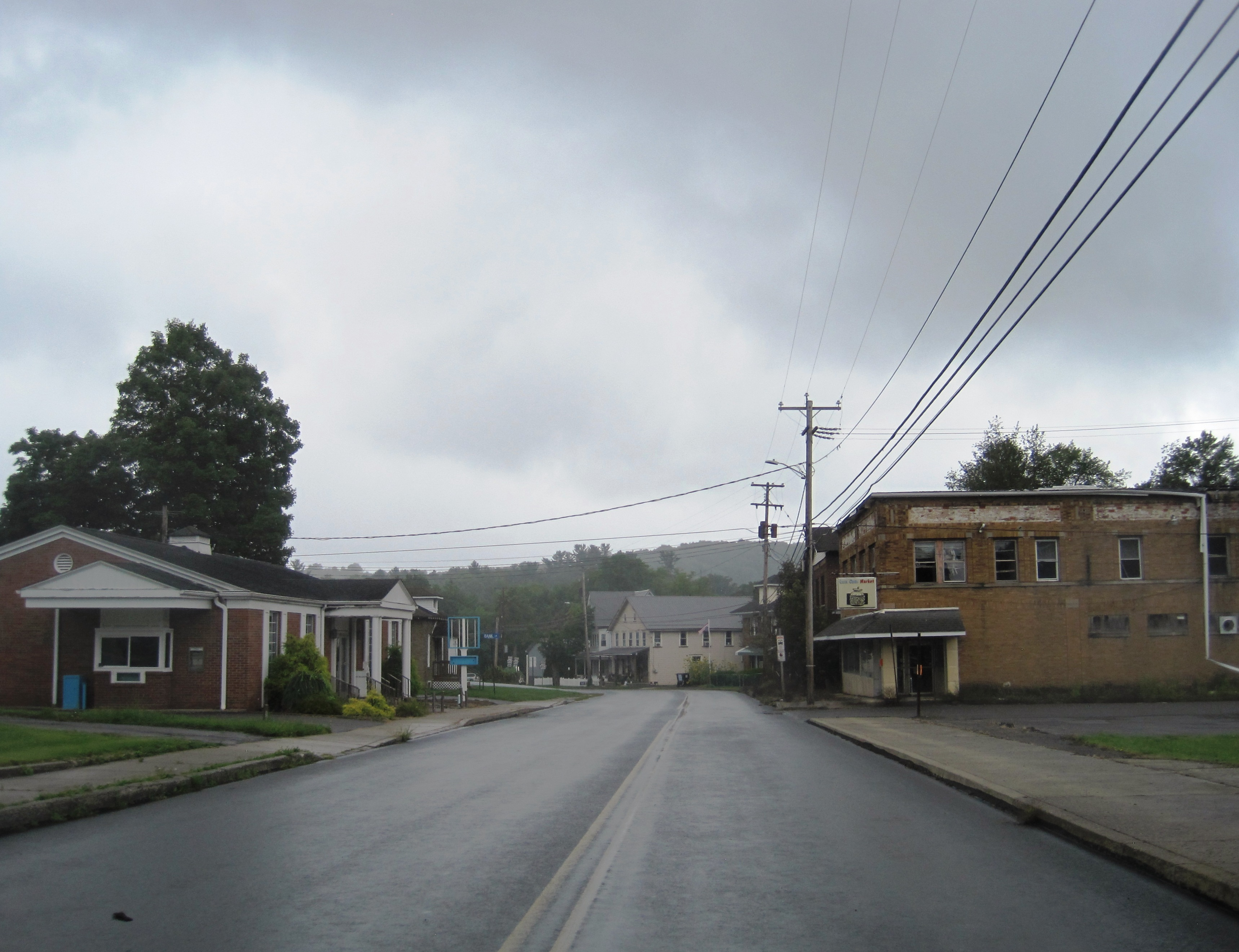
- Southbound PA 53 in Madera

- Location within Pennsylvania
- Coordinates: 40°49′42″N 78°26′06″W
- Country: United States
- State: Pennsylvania
- County: Clearfield
- Elevation: 1,339 ft (408 m)
- Time zone: UTC-5 (Eastern (EST))
  - Summer (DST): UTC-4 (EDT)
- ZIP code: 16661
- Area code: 814
- GNIS feature ID: 1180175

Madera is an unincorporated community in Clearfield County, Pennsylvania, United States. The community is located along Pennsylvania Route 53, 4.4 miles (7.1 km) west of Houtzdale. Madera has a post office with ZIP code 16661, which opened on January 31, 1861. It is located within the Moshannon Valley School District which was ranked number two among High Schools located within Clearfield County.

== Demographics ==
Historical population
| Census | Pop. | Note | %± |

The United States Census Bureau defined Madera as a census designated place (CDP) in 2023.
