= Olanta, Pennsylvania =

Unincorporated community in Pennsylvania, US

- Unincorporated community
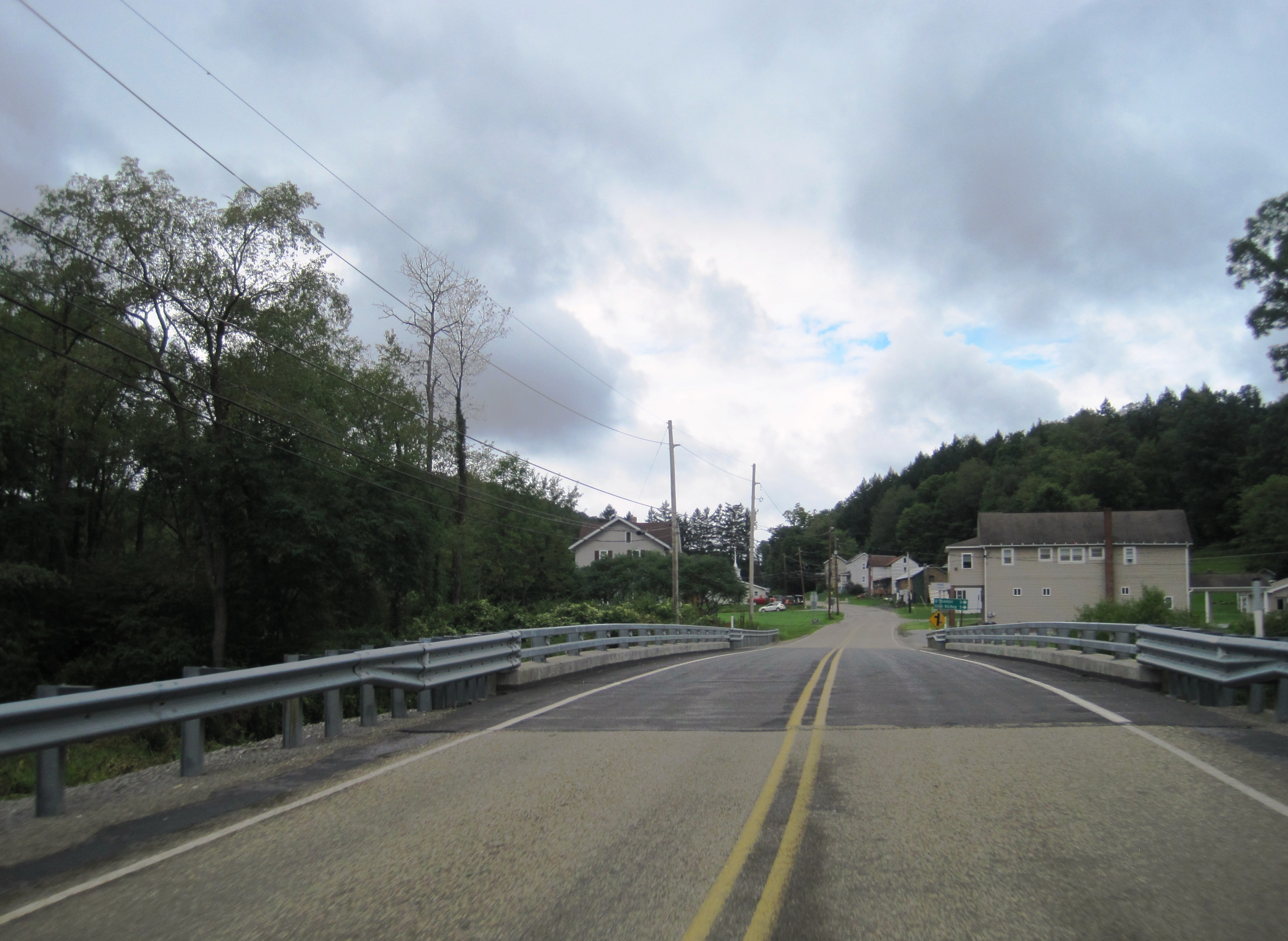
- PA 453 northbound in Olanta

- Location within Pennsylvania
- Coordinates: 40°55′00″N 78°30′23″W
- Country: United States
- State: Pennsylvania
- County: Clearfield
- Elevation: 1,306 ft (398 m)
- Time zone: UTC-5 (Eastern (EST))
  - Summer (DST): UTC-4 (EDT)
- ZIP code: 16863
- Area code: 814
- GNIS feature ID: 1182894

Olanta is an unincorporated community in Clearfield County, Pennsylvania, United States. The community is located along Pennsylvania Route 453, 4.2 miles (6.8 km) south-southeast of Curwensville. Olanta has a post office, with ZIP code 16863.
