= Morann, Pennsylvania =

Unincorporated community in Pennsylvania, US

- Unincorporated community
- Location within Pennsylvania
- Coordinates: 40°47′11″N 78°22′01″W
- Country: United States
- State: Pennsylvania
- County: Clearfield
- Elevation: 1,598 ft (487 m)
- Time zone: UTC-5 (Eastern (EST))
  - Summer (DST): UTC-4 (EDT)
- ZIP code: 16663
- Area code: 814
- GNIS feature ID: 1181528

Morann is an unincorporated community in Clearfield County, Pennsylvania, United States. The community is located along Pennsylvania Route 153, 2.8 miles (4.5 km) south-southwest of Houtzdale. Morann has a post office with ZIP code 16663, which opened on June 19, 1890.
