= Bigler Township, Pennsylvania =

Township in Pennsylvania, US

Coordinates: 40°49′51″N 78°26′04″W

- Township
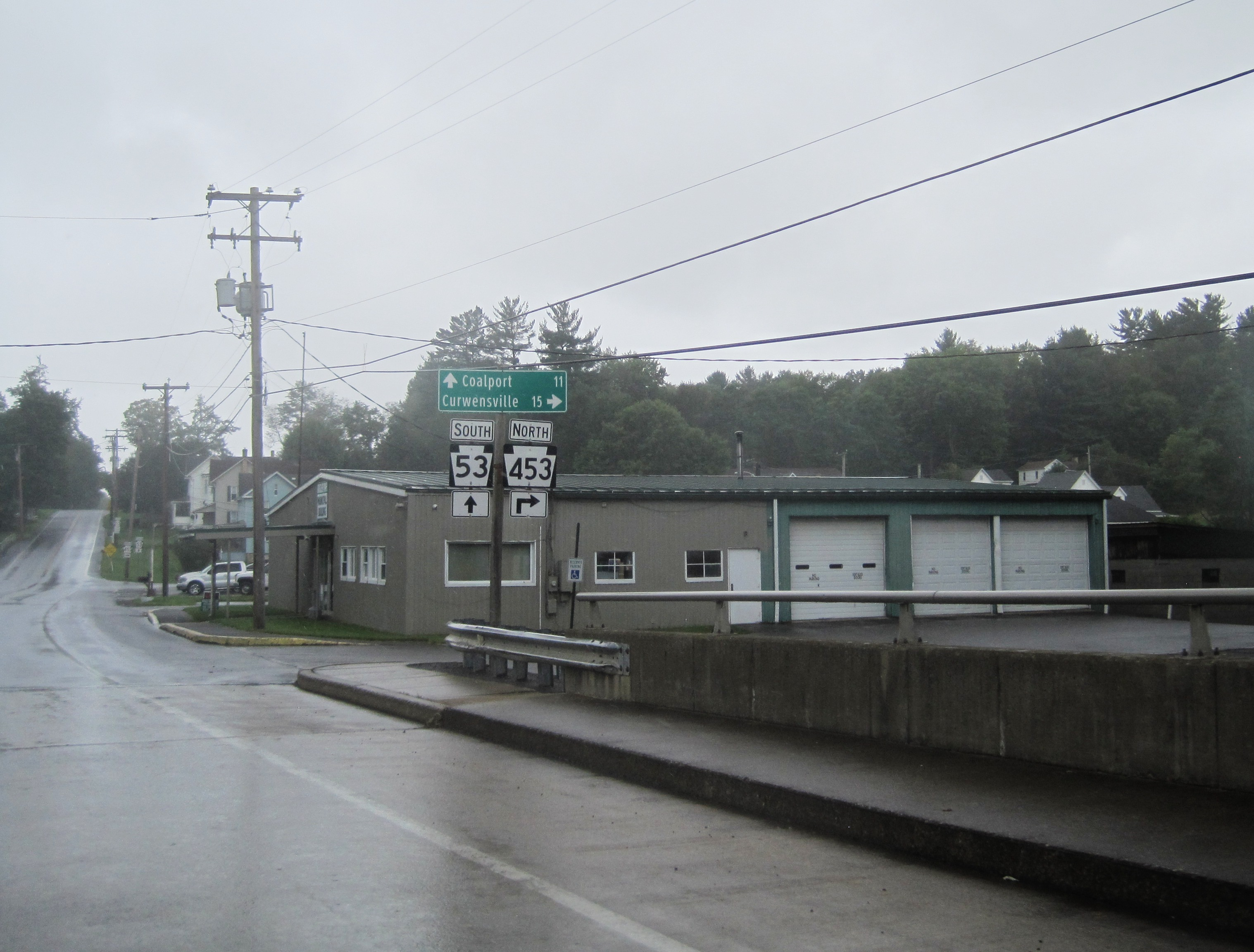
- Town hall

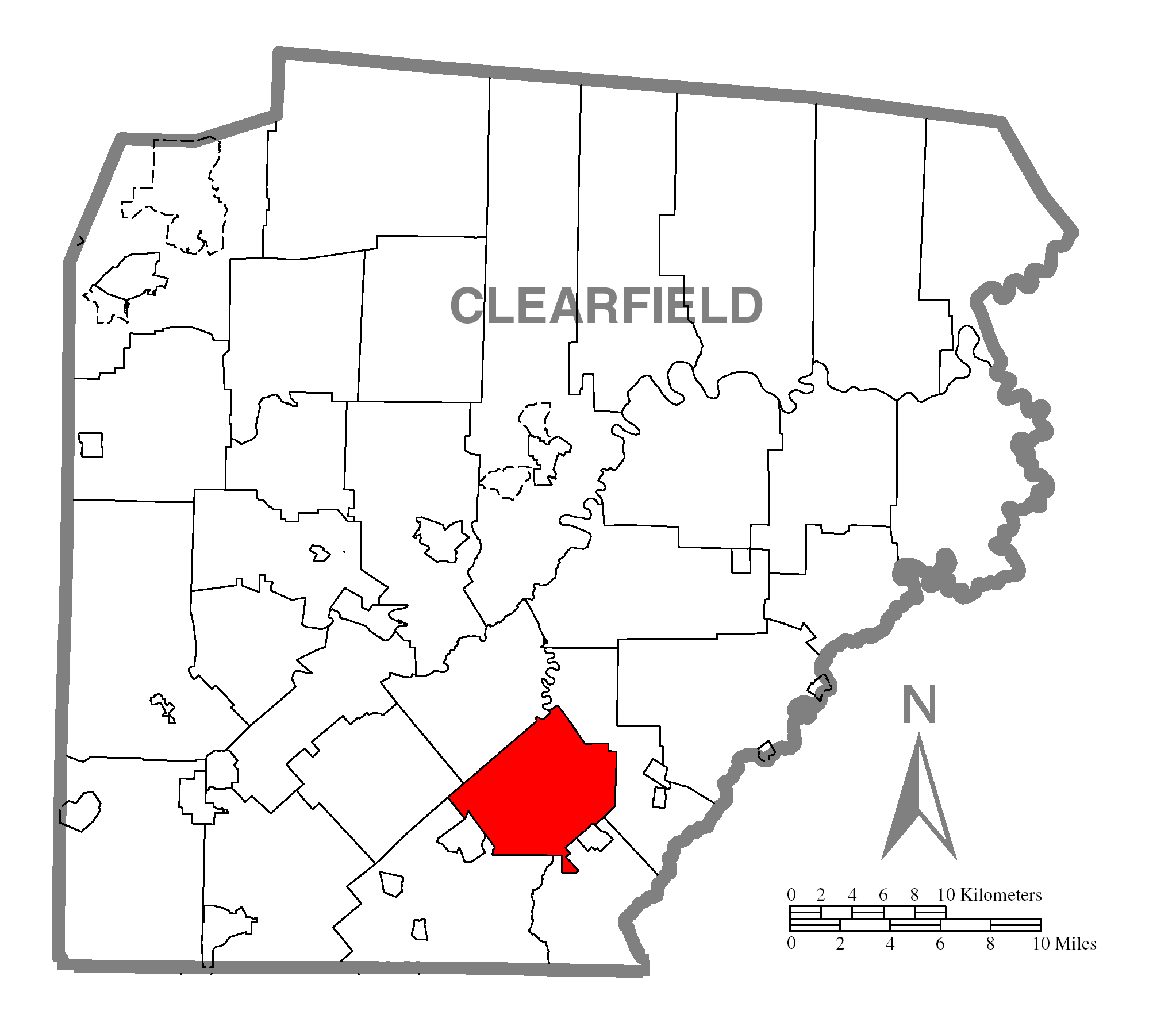
- Map of Clearfield County, Pennsylvania highlighting Bigler Township

- Map of Clearfield County, Pennsylvania
- Country: United States
- State: Pennsylvania
- County: Clearfield
- Incorporated: 1883

Area
  - Total: 24.58 sq mi (63.65 km^{2})
  - Land: 24.28 sq mi (62.88 km^{2})
  - Water: 0.30 sq mi (0.77 km^{2})

Population (2020)
  - Total: 1,242 ▼
  - Estimate (2022): 1,227 ▼
  - Density: 51.4/sq mi (19.83/km^{2})
- Time zone: UTC-5 (Eastern (EST))
  - Summer (DST): UTC-4 (EDT)
- Area code: 814
- FIPS code: 42-033-06288

Bigler Township is a township in Clearfield County, Pennsylvania, United States. The population was 1,242 at the 2020 census.

It is served by the Moshannon Valley Vol. Fire Department which is located about 1/4 away from the Bigler Township Recreational Building.

== Geography ==
According to the United States Census Bureau, the township has a total area of 24.8 square miles (64 km^{2}), all land.

== Communities ==
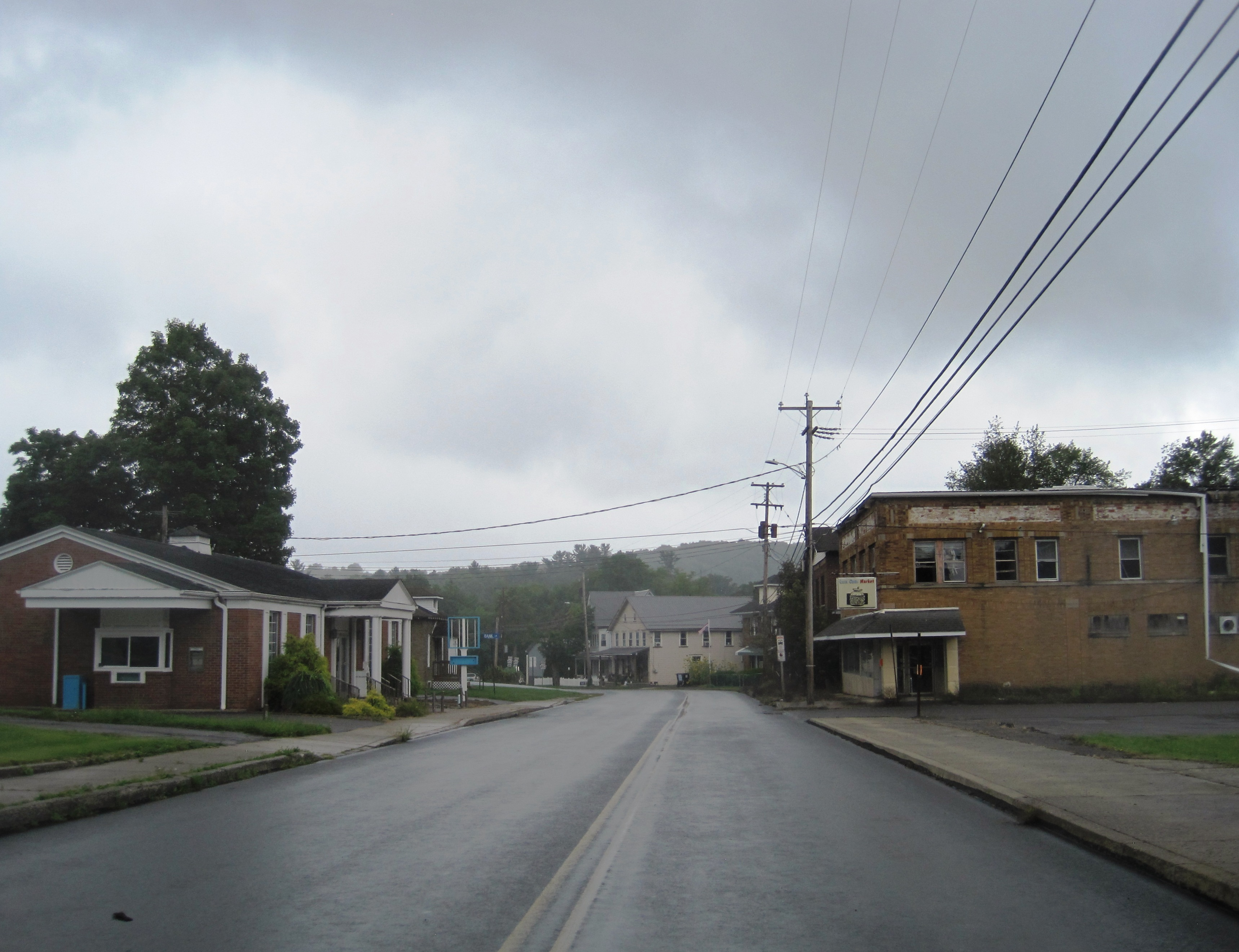
Village of Madera within Bigler Township

- Amesville
- Atlantic
- Belsena Mills
- Betz
- Blackburn
- Booker
- Beulah
- Chesterfield
- Madera
- Mascot
- Smoke Run

== Demographics ==
Historical population
Census	Pop.	Note	%±
1970	1,474		—
1980	1,604		8.8%
1990	1,391		−13.3%
2000	1,368		−1.7%
2010	1,289		−5.8%
2020	1,242		−3.6%
2022 (est.)	1,227		−1.2%
U.S. Decennial Census

As of the census of 2000, there were 1,368 people, 547 households, and 386 families residing in the township. The population density was 55.2 inhabitants per square mile (21.3/km^{2}). There were 647 housing units at an average density of 26.1 per square mile (10.1/km^{2}). The racial makeup of the township was 99.05% White, 0.07% African American, 0.07% Asian, 0.22% from other races, and 0.58% from two or more races. Hispanic or Latino of any race were 0.15% of the population.

There were 547 households, out of which 30.5% had children under the age of 18 living with them, 55.8% were married couples living together, 9.7% had a female householder with no husband present, and 29.4% were non-families. 24.7% of all households were made up of individuals, and 16.6% had someone living alone who was 65 years of age or older. The average household size was 2.50 and the average family size was 2.97.

In the township the population was spread out, with 24.3% under the age of 18, 6.3% from 18 to 24, 28.1% from 25 to 44, 23.0% from 45 to 64, and 18.3% who were 65 years of age or older. The median age was 39 years. For every 100 females, there were 93.5 males. For every 100 females age 18 and over, there were 89.7 males.

The median income for a household in the township was $22,792, and the median income for a family was $28,482. Males had a median income of $26,471 versus $17,604 for females. The per capita income for the township was $12,434. About 15.7% of families and 19.5% of the population were below the poverty line, including 31.2% of those under age 18 and 16.2% of those age 65 or over.

== Education ==
Students in Bigler Township attend schools in the Moshannon Valley School District.

== Recreation ==
A portion of the Pennsylvania State Game Lands Number 60 is located at the southern border of the township.
