= Brisbin, Pennsylvania =

Borough in Pennsylvania, US

- Borough
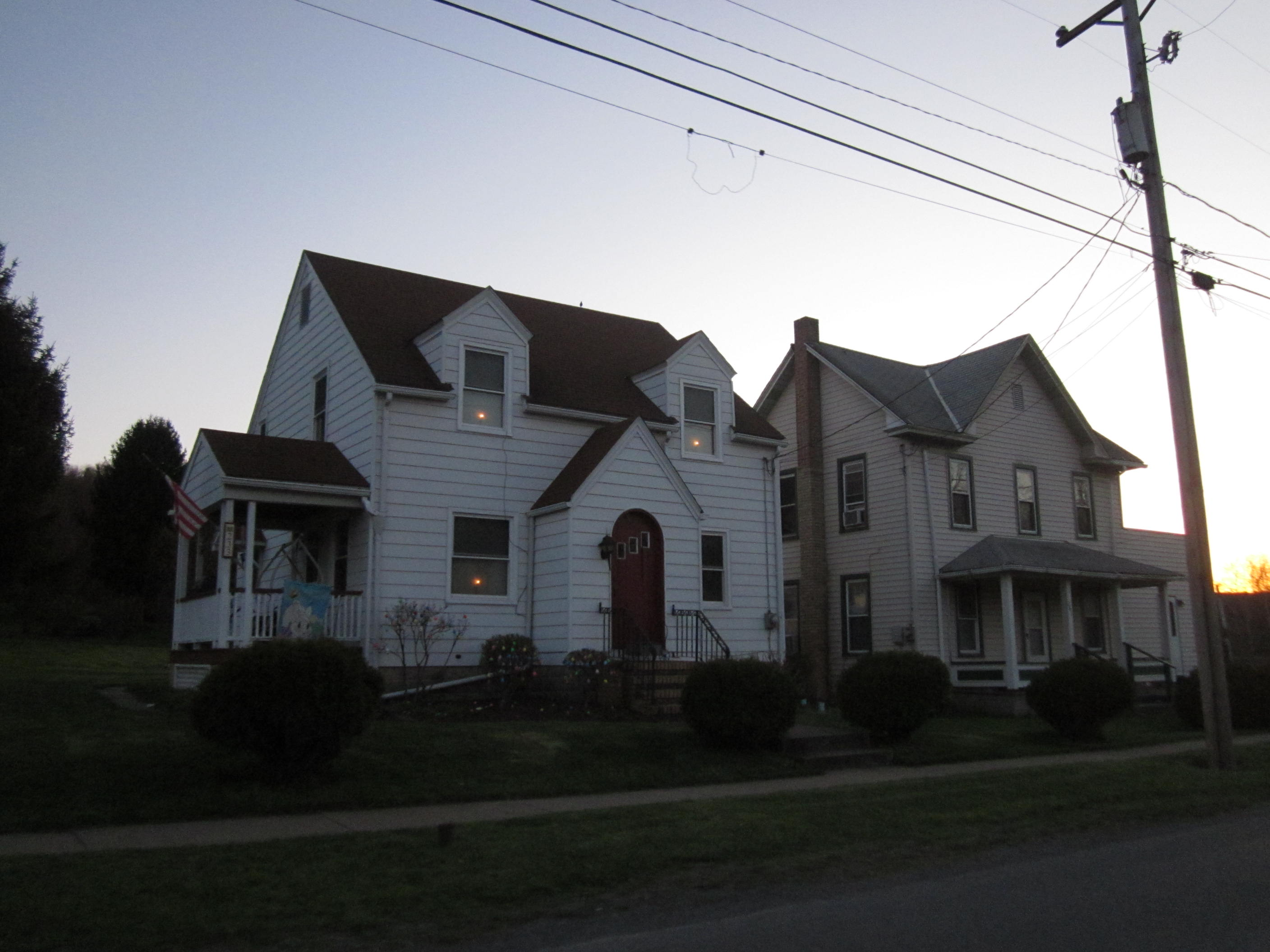
- Brisbin, Pennsylvania

- Location of Brisbin in Clearfield County, Pennsylvania.

- Map showing Clearfield County in Pennsylvania

- Location in Pennsylvania
- Coordinates: 40°50′22″N 78°21′09″W
- Country: United States
- State: Pennsylvania
- County: Clearfield
- Settled: 1854
- Incorporated: 1883

Government
  - Type: Borough Council

Area
  - Total: 0.73 sq mi (1.89 km^{2})
  - Land: 0.71 sq mi (1.85 km^{2})
  - Water: 0.015 sq mi (0.04 km^{2})
- Elevation: 1,578 ft (481 m)

Population (2020)
  - Total: 422
  - Density: 590.9/sq mi (228.15/km^{2})
- Time zone: UTC-5 (Eastern (EST))
  - Summer (DST): UTC-4 (EDT)
- Zip code: 16620
- Area code: 814
- FIPS code: 42-08744
- GNIS feature ID: 1215093

Brisbin is a borough in Clearfield County, Pennsylvania, United States. The population was 422 at the 2020 census.

== Geography ==
Brisbin is located in southeastern Clearfield County and is nearly surrounded by Woodward Township, though Decatur Township partially borders it on the east. The borough of Houtzdale is directly to the south.

According to the United States Census Bureau, the borough has a total area of 0.73 square miles (1.89 km^{2}), of which 0.71 square miles (1.85 km^{2}) is land and 0.02 square miles (0.04 km^{2}), or 1.98%, is water. Gose Run flows through the borough, leading east to Beaver Run, which in turn flows east to Moshannon Creek, a tributary of the West Branch Susquehanna River.

== Demographics ==
Historical population
Census	Pop.	Note	%±
1890	1,508		—
1900	666		−55.8%
1910	459		−31.1%
1920	570		24.2%
1930	436		−23.5%
1940	501		14.9%
1950	463		−7.6%
1960	398		−14.0%
1970	364		−8.5%
1980	387		6.3%
1990	369		−4.7%
2000	413		11.9%
2010	411		−0.5%
2020	422		2.7%
2021 (est.)	421	▼	−0.2%

As of the census of 2000, there were 413 people, 166 households, and 124 families residing in the borough. The population density was 655.2 inhabitants per square mile (253.0/km^{2}). There were 181 housing units at an average density of 287.1 per square mile (110.8/km^{2}). The racial makeup of the borough was 98.79% White, 0.24% African American, 0.24% from other races, and 0.73% from two or more races. Hispanic or Latino of any race were 0.24% of the population.

There were 166 households, out of which 34.3% had children under the age of 18 living with them, 60.2% were married couples living together, 12.0% had a female householder with no husband present, and 24.7% were non-families. 22.3% of all households were made up of individuals, and 10.2% had someone living alone who was 65 years of age or older. The average household size was 2.49 and the average family size was 2.91.

In the borough the population was spread out, with 23.5% under the age of 18, 5.3% from 18 to 24, 31.2% from 25 to 44, 24.5% from 45 to 64, and 15.5% who were 65 years of age or older. The median age was 38 years. For every 100 females there were 88.6 males. For every 100 females age 18 and over, there were 81.6 males.

The median income for a household in the borough was $30,250, and the median income for a family was $35,875. Males had a median income of $28,750 versus $21,250 for females. The per capita income for the borough was $13,805. About 16.0% of families and 18.8% of the population were below the poverty line, including 30.5% of those under age 18 and 7.5% of those age 65 or over.

== Notable people ==
- Thomas Cynfelyn Benjamin (1850–1925), Welsh-language poet and Congregational minister, began his ministerial career at Brisbin's Congregational chapel in 1884.
