= SCI Houtzdale =

Facility in Pennsylvania

Coordinates: 40°48′44″N 78°21′23″W

State Correctional Institution - Houtzdale
- Interactive map of State Correctional Institution - Houtzdale
- Location: Woodward Township, Clearfield County, Pennsylvania
- Security class: Medium-Security
- Capacity: 1,587
- Opened: 1996
- Managed by: Pennsylvania Department of Corrections

State Correctional Institution – Houtzdale is a 1500-bed correctional facility located outside Houtzdale in southern Clearfield County, Pennsylvania, along Pennsylvania Route 153.

== Background ==
SCI Houtzdale was built to address overcrowding elsewhere in Pennsylvania's prison system. The facility broke ground in 1994. The facility cost $70 Million to construct and, when opened in January 1996, had a bed capacity of 1,587. In December of 2025, Houtzdale held 2,160 inmates against a public capacity of 2,420 individuals, or 89.3%.

=== Illegal substances ===
The prison has had several incidents with illegal drugs. In March 2019, a member of prison staff was found to be delivering a "large quantity" of drugs to an inmate at the facility. In 2025, a female visitor was found to have brought drugs to supply an inmate at the facility during a visitation meeting.

=== Staff and inmate relations ===
In 2012, a corrections worker pled guilty to sexual assault against an inmate at the facility. In April 2015, inmates refusing to return to their housing units started a riot that injured five members of staff. In June 2019, an officer working at the facility was seriously hurt after an assault by an inmate. In October 2019, a corrections worker was charged after she was found to be having a sexual relationship with an inmate.

Inmates have described acts of cruelty by contractors working at the facility.

=== Inmate deaths ===
The facility has had a number of inmate deaths. In August 2020, inmate Garrick Bloom was strangled to death, it was later ruled a homicide. In January 2021, the facility reported their first inmate death to the COVID-19 pandemic. In May 2022, an inmate was found dead in his cell. In June 2023, Roberto Quevada was found dead in his cell after being killed by his cellmate. In February 2024, Daniel Barnett was found dead in his cell. That October, inmate Anthony Raimo was found dead in his cell. The next month, inmate Lance Heverly was found unresponsive in his cell.

== Notable inmates ==
- Warren McGlone (alias Steady B) - Hip hop artist, convicted in the murder of Philadelphia Police Department officer Lauretha Vaird in a bank robbery. He's now in SCI Phoenix

== See also ==
- List of Pennsylvania state prisons
