= Gulich Township, Clearfield County, Pennsylvania =

Township in Pennsylvania, US

Coordinates: 40°47′00″N 78°22′28″W

Gulich Township, Pennsylvania
- Township
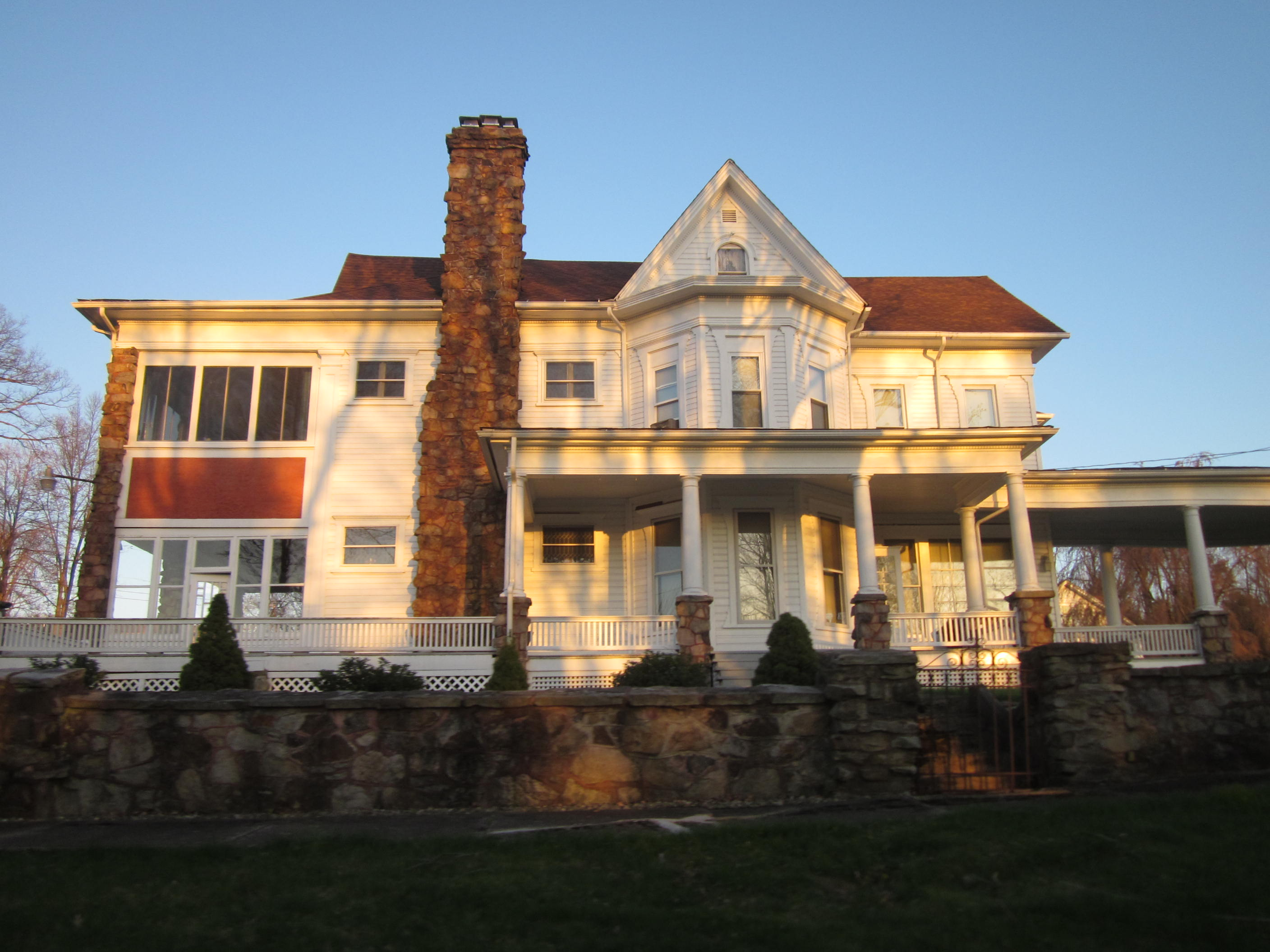
- The historic Mountz House in Janesville

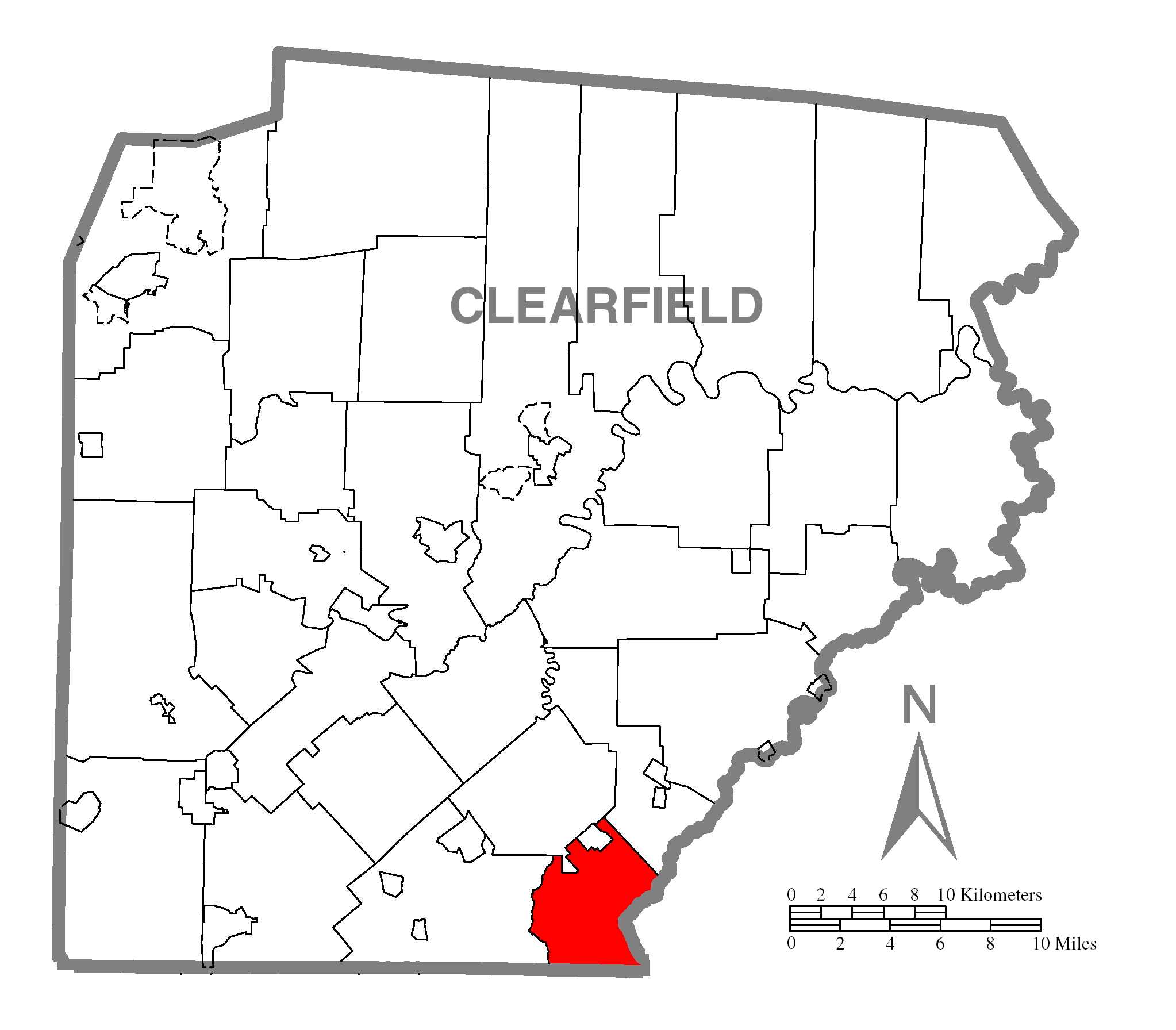
- Map of Clearfield County, Pennsylvania highlighting Gulich Township

- Map of Clearfield County, Pennsylvania
- Country: United States
- State: Pennsylvania
- County: Clearfield
- Settled: 1840
- Incorporated: 1858

Area
  - Total: 19.98 sq mi (51.75 km^{2})
  - Land: 19.88 sq mi (51.49 km^{2})
  - Water: 0.097 sq mi (0.25 km^{2})

Population (2020)
  - Total: 1,204 ▼
  - Estimate (2022): 1,199 ▼
  - Density: 61.5/sq mi (23.73/km^{2})
- Time zone: UTC-5 (Eastern (EST))
  - Summer (DST): UTC-4 (EDT)
- Area code: 814
- FIPS code: 42-033-31752
- Website: https://gulichtwp.org/

Gulich Township is a township in Clearfield County, Pennsylvania, United States. The population was 1,204 at the 2020 census.

== Geography ==
According to the United States Census Bureau, the township has a total area of 20.1 square miles (52 km^{2}), of which 20.1 square miles (52 km^{2}) is land and 0.05% is water.

== Communities ==
- Allemans
- Almaden
- Fernwood
- Ginter
- Janesville (also known as Smithmill)
- Morann
- Waltzvale
- Viola

== Demographics ==
Historical population
Census	Pop.	Note	%±
2000	1,275		—
2010	1,235		−3.1%
2020	1,204		−2.5%
2022 (est.)	1,199		−0.4%
U.S. Decennial Census

As of the census of 2000, there were 1,275 people, 529 households, and 365 families residing in the township. The population density was 63.6 inhabitants per square mile (24.6/km^{2}). There were 616 housing units at an average density of 30.7 per square mile (11.9/km^{2}). The racial makeup of the township was 99.37% White, 0.08% Native American, 0.08% Pacific Islander and 0.47% from two or more races.

There were 529 households, out of which 27.0% had children under the age of 18 living with them, 56.7% were married couples living together, 7.4% had a female householder with no husband present and 31.0% were non-families. 28.2% of all households were made up of individuals and 19.1% had someone living alone who was 65 years of age or older. The average household size was 2.41 and the average family size was 2.92.

In the township the population was spread out, with 22.0% under the age of 18, 6.0% from 18 to 24, 26.0% from 25 to 44, 24.4% from 45 to 64, and 21.6% who were 65 years of age or older. The median age was 43 years. For every 100 females, there were 98.9 males. For every 100 females age 18 and over, there were 96.8 males.

The median income for a household in the township was $29,150, and the median income for a family was $36,652. Males had a median income of $28,333 versus $18,125 for females. The per capita income for the township was $14,405. About 8.4% of families and 10.6% of the population were below the poverty line, including 10.9% of those under age 18 and 7.3% of those age 65 or over.

Gulich Township has a high percentages of people of Ukrainian ancestry - 12.7%.

== Education ==
Students in Gulich Township are served by the Moshannon Valley School District.

== Recreation ==
Mountz Memorial Park is located adjacent to Smithmill, and a portion of the Pennsylvania State Game Lands Number 60 occupies a large area of the northern part of the township.
