= Janesville, Pennsylvania =

Unincorporated community in Pennsylvania, US

- Unincorporated community
- Location within Pennsylvania
- Coordinates: 40°45′36″N 78°25′17″W
- Country: United States
- State: Pennsylvania
- County: Clearfield
- Elevation: 1,545 ft (471 m)
- Time zone: UTC-5 (Eastern (EST))
  - Summer (DST): UTC-4 (EDT)
- ZIP code: 16680
- Area code: 814
- GNIS feature ID: 1177990

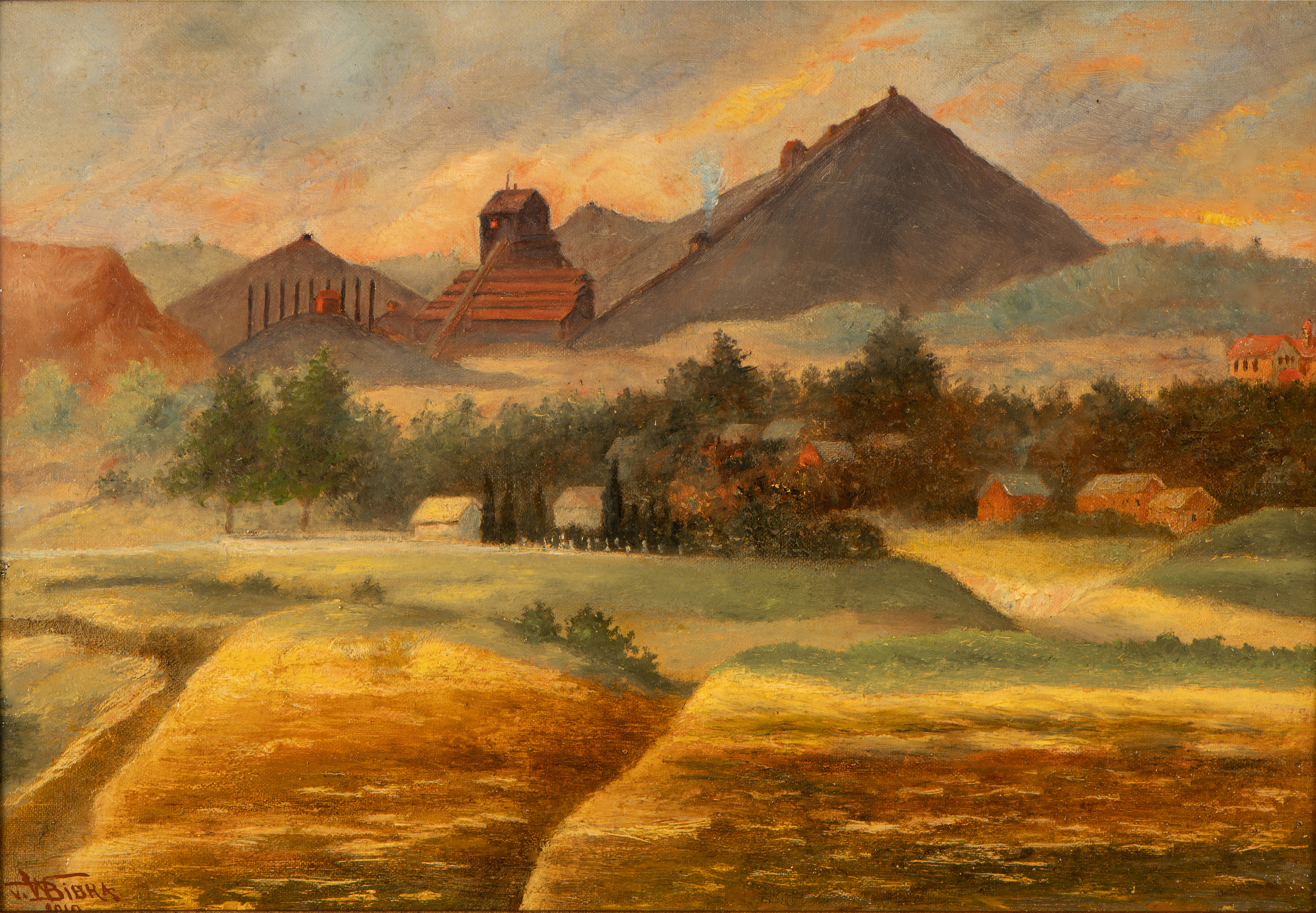
Janesville Breaker in 1919 by Wolfgang von Bibra

Janesville (also known as Smithmill) is an unincorporated community in Gulich Township, Clearfield County, Pennsylvania, United States. The community is located at the intersection of state routes 253, 453 and 729, 2.9 miles (4.7 km) south-southwest of Ramey. Janesville has a post office named Smithmill with ZIP code 16680, which opened on February 25, 1826.
