= Houtzdale, Pennsylvania =

Borough in Pennsylvania, US

- Borough
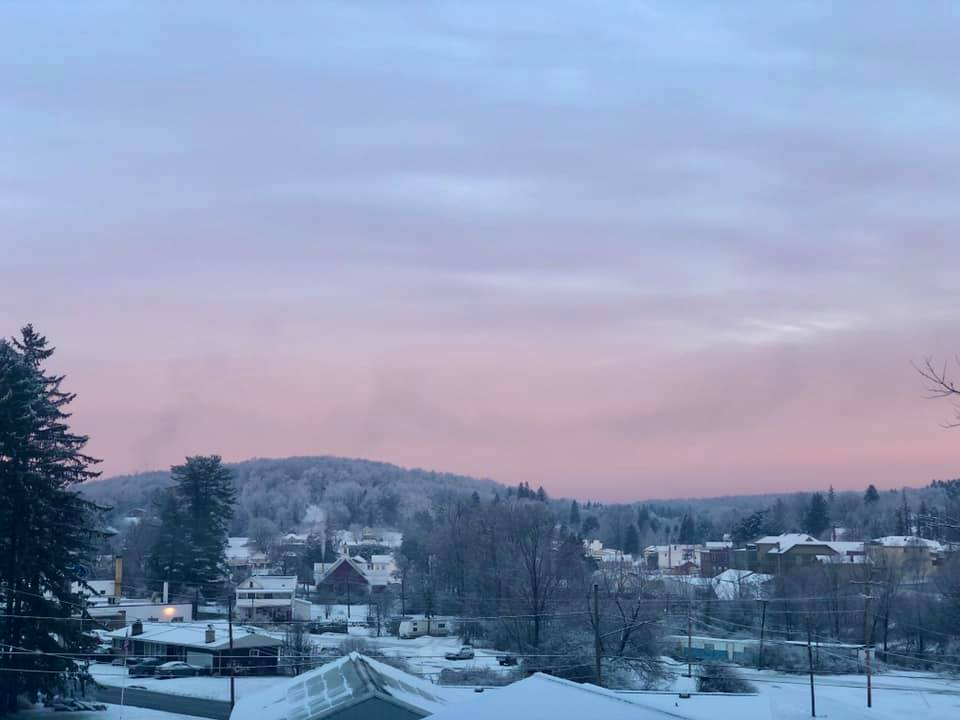
- Houtzdale skyline in January 2021

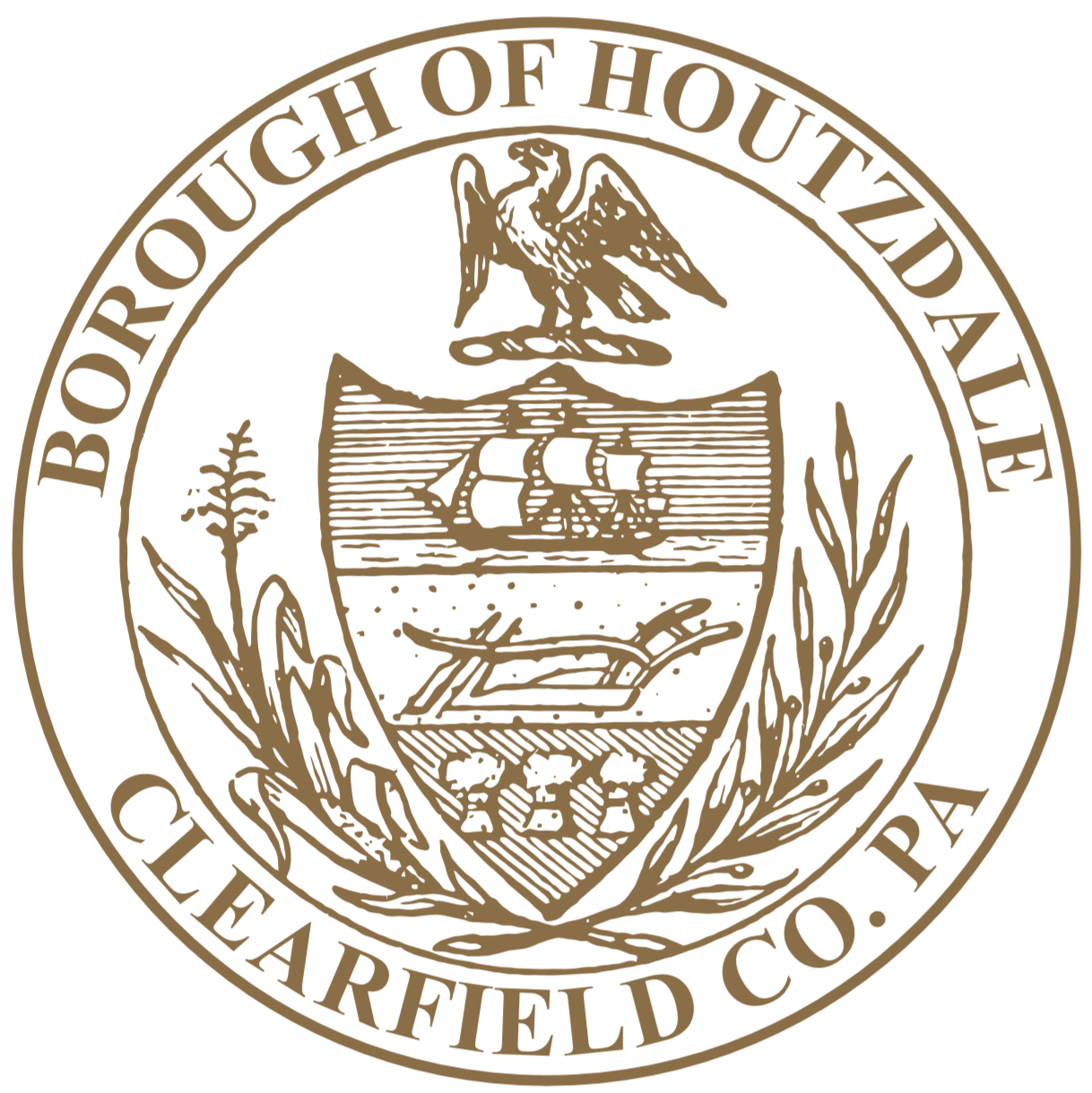
- Seal

- Location within Clearfield County and State of Pennsylvania
- Coordinates: 40°49′30″N 78°21′04″W
- Country: United States
- State: Pennsylvania
- County: Clearfield
- Township: Woodward
- Founded: 1870
- Incorporated: 1872 (Borough)
- Named for: Dr. Daniel Houtz

Government
  - Type: Borough Council
  - Mayor: Sarah Jo Young

Area
  - Total: 0.38 sq mi (0.99 km^{2})
  - Land: 0.38 sq mi (0.99 km^{2})
  - Water: 0 sq mi (0.00 km^{2})
- Elevation: 1,522 ft (464 m)

Population (2020)
  - Total: 764
  - Density: 1,995.5/sq mi (770.45/km^{2})
- Time zone: UTC-5 (EST)
  - Summer (DST): UTC-4 (EDT)
- ZIP code: 16651
- Area code: 814, exchange 378
- FIPS code: 42-35928
- GNIS ID: 1177516

Houtzdale is a borough in Clearfield County, Pennsylvania, United States. The population was 764 at the 2020 census.

== History ==
Houtzdale is named after Dr. Daniel Houtz, the original owner of the town site. The town was built quickly in the late 19th century and is structured on a square grid plan. Focused mainly on the railroad and coal industry, the town served as a hub for the railroad which made its way onto Ramey and Madera to the west. Houtzdale become an incorporated borough in 1872.

== Geography ==
Houtzdale is bordered to the north by the borough of Brisbin. Pennsylvania Route 53 passes through Houtzdale, leading east 5 miles (8 km) to Osceola Mills and west 9 miles (14 km) to Glen Hope. Pennsylvania Route 153 leads north from Houtzdale 17 miles (27 km) to Clearfield, the county seat.

According to the United States Census Bureau, Houtzdale has a total area of 0.38 square miles (0.99 km^{2}), all land.

== Demographics ==
Historical population
Census	Pop.	Note	%±
1880	2,060		—
1890	2,231		8.3%
1900	1,482		−33.6%
1910	1,434		−3.2%
1920	1,504		4.9%
1930	1,351		−10.2%
1940	1,430		5.8%
1950	1,306		−8.7%
1960	1,239		−5.1%
1970	1,193		−3.7%
1980	1,222		2.4%
1990	1,204		−1.5%
2000	941		−21.8%
2010	797		−15.3%
2020	764		−4.1%
2021 (est.)	761	▼	−0.4%

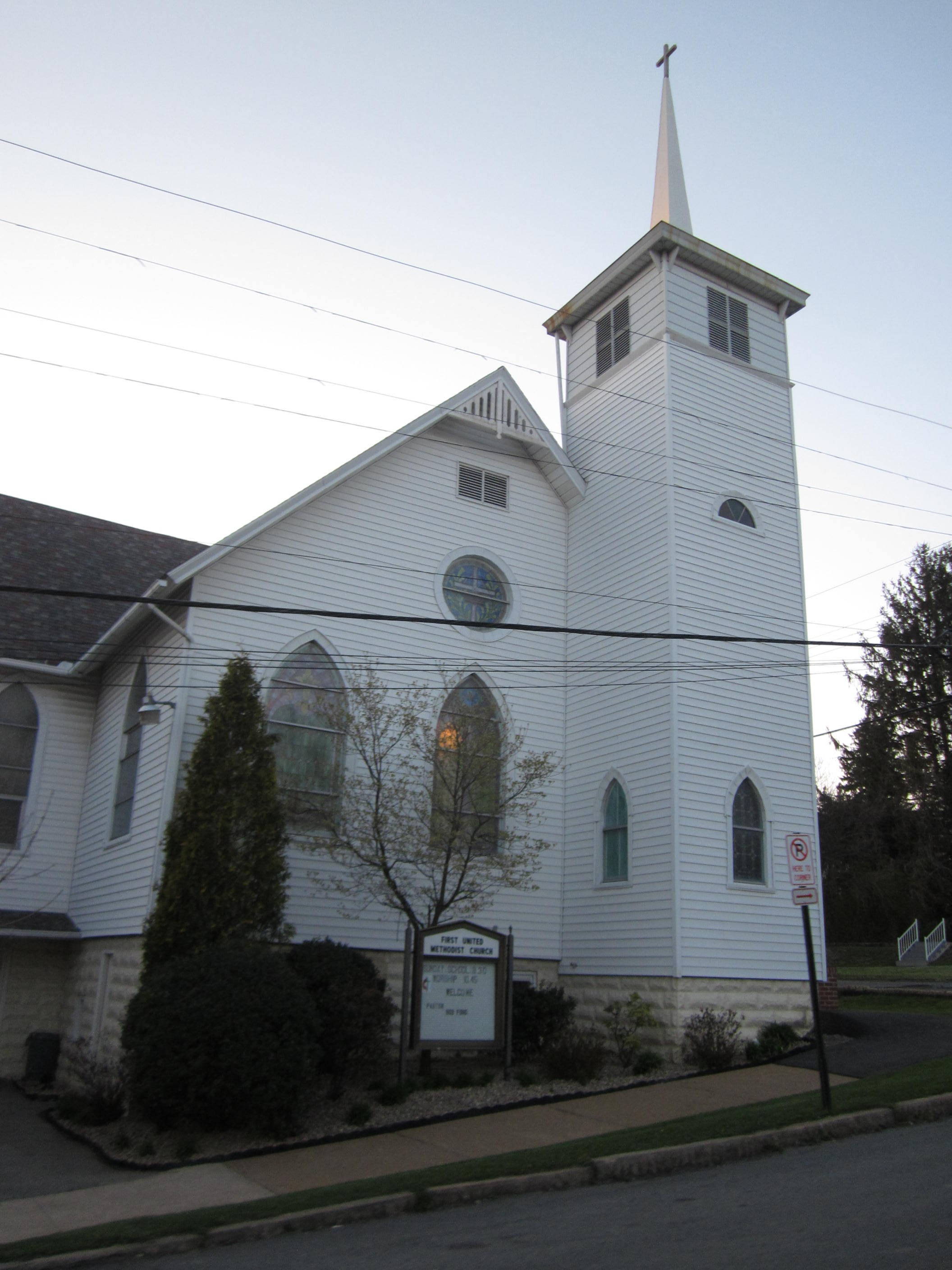
First United Methodist Church (2012)

As of the census of 2000, there were 941 people, 380 households, and 275 families residing in the borough. The population density was 2,682.2 inhabitants per square mile (1,035.6/km^{2}). There were 432 housing units at an average density of 1,231.4 per square mile (475.4/km^{2}). The racial makeup of the borough was 99.57% White, 0.21% Native American, and 0.21% from two or more races.

There were 380 households, out of which 34.5% had children under the age of 18 living with them, 51.1% were married couples living together, 15.3% had a female householder with no husband present, and 27.4% were non-families. 25.8% of all households were made up of individuals, and 11.8% had someone living alone who was 65 years of age or older. The average household size was 2.47 and the average family size was 2.89.

In the borough, the population was spread out, with 25.8% under the age of 18, 5.8% from 18 to 24, 27.2% from 25 to 44, 22.4% from 45 to 64, and 18.7% who were 65 years of age or older. The median age was 39 years. For every 100 females, there were 94.0 males. For every 100 females age 18 and over, there were 83.7 males.

The median income for a household in the borough was $29,219, and the median income for a family was $33,309. Males had a median income of $27,039 versus $20,438 for females. The per capita income for the borough was $14,177. About 9.3% of families and 12.3% of the population were below the poverty line, including 14.2% of those under age 18 and 15.4% of those age 65 or over.

=== Ukrainian ancestry ===
In 2000, 6.9% of Houtzdale claimed Ukrainian ancestry.

== Parks and recreation ==
In 2020, Trella Memorial Park was created, the first public park in Houtzdale.

== Government ==
The borough council consists of seven members, who are elected in the general elections, and serve four year terms with seats coming available every two years. The mayor serves a four-year term for ceremonial duty. As of 2026, the mayor was Sarah Jo Young.

== Education ==
The community is served by Moshannon Valley School District, which has two schools:

- Moshannon Valley Junior/Senior High School, grades 7–12, located at 4934 Green Acre Road. Mascot known as Black Knights.
- Moshannon Valley Elementary School, grades K-6, located at 5026 Green Acre Road.

== Media ==
WMMH is a Catholic radio station licensed to Houtzdale.

== Notable people ==
- Bill Bishop, (1900–1956), professional baseball pitcher who appeared for the Philadelphia Athletics during the 1921 season
- Camille "Bud" George (1927–2017), mayor of Houtzdale, member of the Pennsylvania State House from 1975 to 2012.
- Irving Kahal (1903–1942), popular song lyricist in the 1920s and 1930s
- Charles Rowland (1860–1921), two term member of the U.S. House of Representatives, president of Moshannon Coal Mining Company and Pittsburgh & Susquehanna Railroad Company
- Edna Yost (1889–1971), book author

== See also ==
- State Correctional Institution – Houtzdale is located south of Houtzdale
