= Sandy Ridge, Pennsylvania =

Unincorporated community in Pennsylvania, US

- Census-designated place
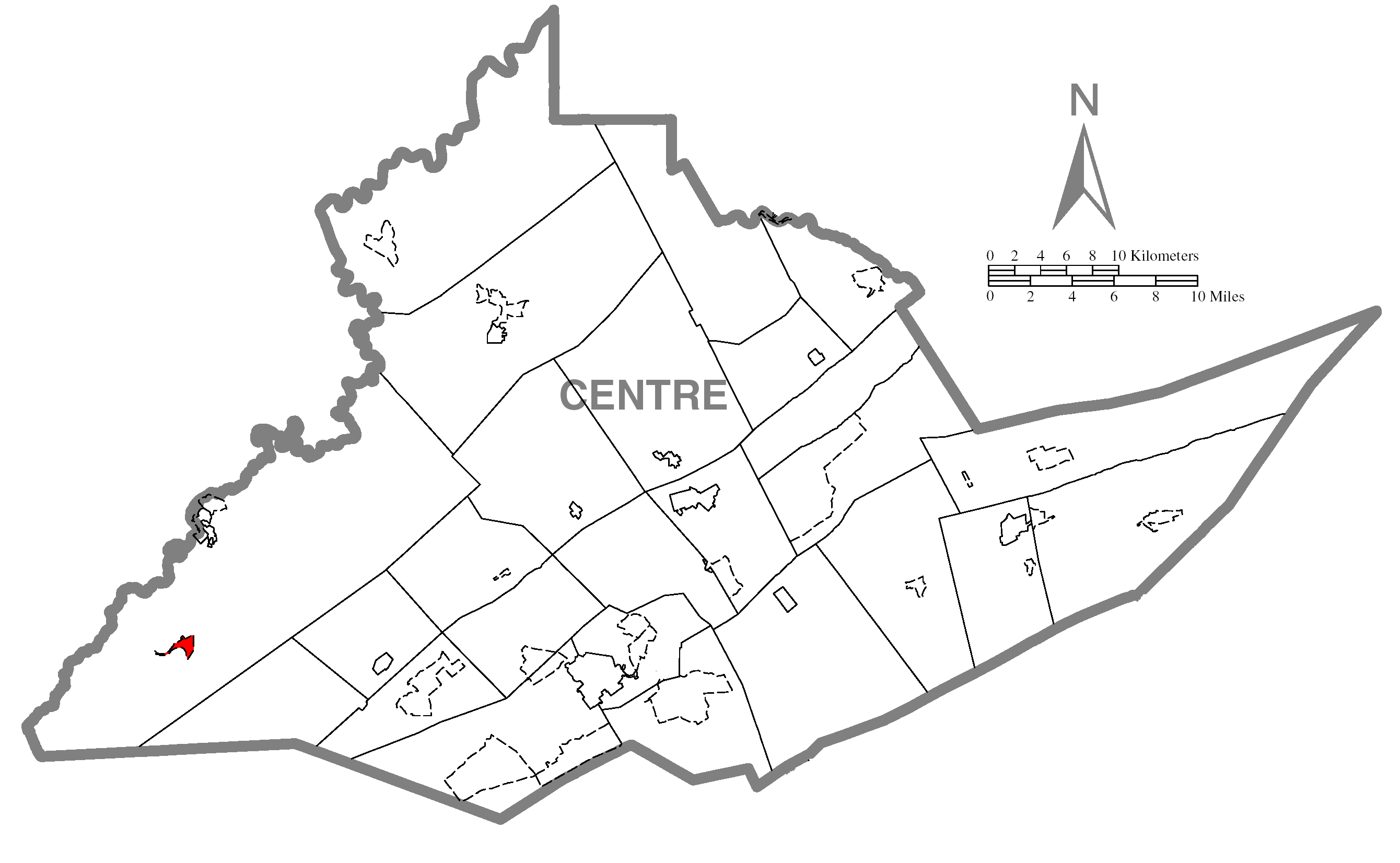
- Location within Centre County

- Location within the U.S. state of Pennsylvania Sandy; Ridge (the United States)
- Coordinates: 40°48′43″N 78°13′56″W
- Country: United States
- State: Pennsylvania
- County: Centre
- Township: Rush

Area
  - Total: 0.64 sq mi (1.65 km^{2})
  - Land: 0.64 sq mi (1.65 km^{2})
  - Water: 0 sq mi (0.0 km^{2})
- Elevation: 1,850 ft (560 m)

Population (2010)
  - Total: 407
  - Density: 639/sq mi (246.7/km^{2})
- Time zone: UTC-5 (Eastern (EST))
  - Summer (DST): UTC-4 (EDT)
- ZIP codes: 16677
- Area code: 814
- FIPS code: 42-67872
- GNIS feature ID: 1186955

Sandy Ridge is an unincorporated community and census-designated place (CDP) in Centre County, Pennsylvania, United States. It is part of the State College, Pennsylvania Metropolitan Statistical Area. The population was 407 at the 2010 census.

== Geography ==
Sandy Ridge is located in Pennsylvania, at 40°48′43″N 78°13′56″W (40.811904, -78.232142), southwest of the center of Rush Township. It sits at an elevation of 1,800 to 1,950 feet (550 to 590 m), 3 miles (5 km) northwest of the physical Sandy Ridge, the 2,500-foot-high (760 m) local expression of the Allegheny Front.

Pennsylvania Route 970 passes through the community, leading northwest 4 miles (6 km) to Osceola Mills on Moshannon Creek in Clearfield County. Pennsylvania Route 350 forms the eastern edge of the community, leading north 6 miles (10 km) to Philipsburg (also on Moshannon Creek) and south over the Allegheny Front 9 miles (14 km) to Interstate 99 at Bald Eagle.

According to the United States Census Bureau, the Sandy Ridge CDP has a total area of 0.64 square miles (1.65 km^{2}), all of it land.

== Demographics ==
As of the census of 2010, there were 407 people, 170 households, and 129 families residing in the CDP. The population density was 620.1 inhabitants per square mile (239.4/km^{2}). There were 194 housing units at an average density of 295.6/sq mi (114.2/km^{2}). The racial makeup of the CDP was 99.8% White and 0.2% other.

There were 170 households, out of which 28.8% had children under the age of 18 living with them, 61.2% were married couples living together, 5.9% had a male householder with no wife present, 8.8% had a female householder with no husband present, and 24.1% were non-families. 22.9% of all households were made up of individuals, and 14.1% had someone living alone who was 65 years of age or older. The average household size was 2.39 and the average family size was 2.73.

In the CDP, the population was spread out, with 19.7% under the age of 18, 7.4% from 18 to 24, 23.6% from 25 to 44, 28.2% from 45 to 64, and 21.1% who were 65 years of age or older. The median age was 45 years. For every 100 females, there were 95.7 males. For every 100 females age 18 and over, there were 92.4 males.

The median income for a household in the CDP was $41,406, and the median income for a family was $79,500. The per capita income for the CDP was $24,197. None of the families and 2.5% of the population were living below the poverty line, including no under eighteens and none of those over 64.
