= Beccaria, Pennsylvania =

Unincorporated community in Pennsylvania, US

- Unincorporated community
- Location within Pennsylvania
- Coordinates: 40°46′12″N 78°26′53″W
- Country: United States
- State: Pennsylvania
- County: Clearfield
- Elevation: 1,375 ft (419 m)
- Time zone: UTC-5 (Eastern (EST))
  - Summer (DST): UTC-4 (EDT)
- ZIP code: 16616
- Area code: 814
- GNIS feature ID: 1169073

Beccaria is an unincorporated community in Clearfield County, Pennsylvania, United States. The community is located along Pennsylvania Route 729, 3.4 miles (5.5 km) southeast of Glen Hope. Beccaria has a post office with ZIP code 16616.
