= Woodward Township, Clearfield County, Pennsylvania =

Township in Pennsylvania, US

Coordinates: 40°50′00″N 78°19′59″W

- Township
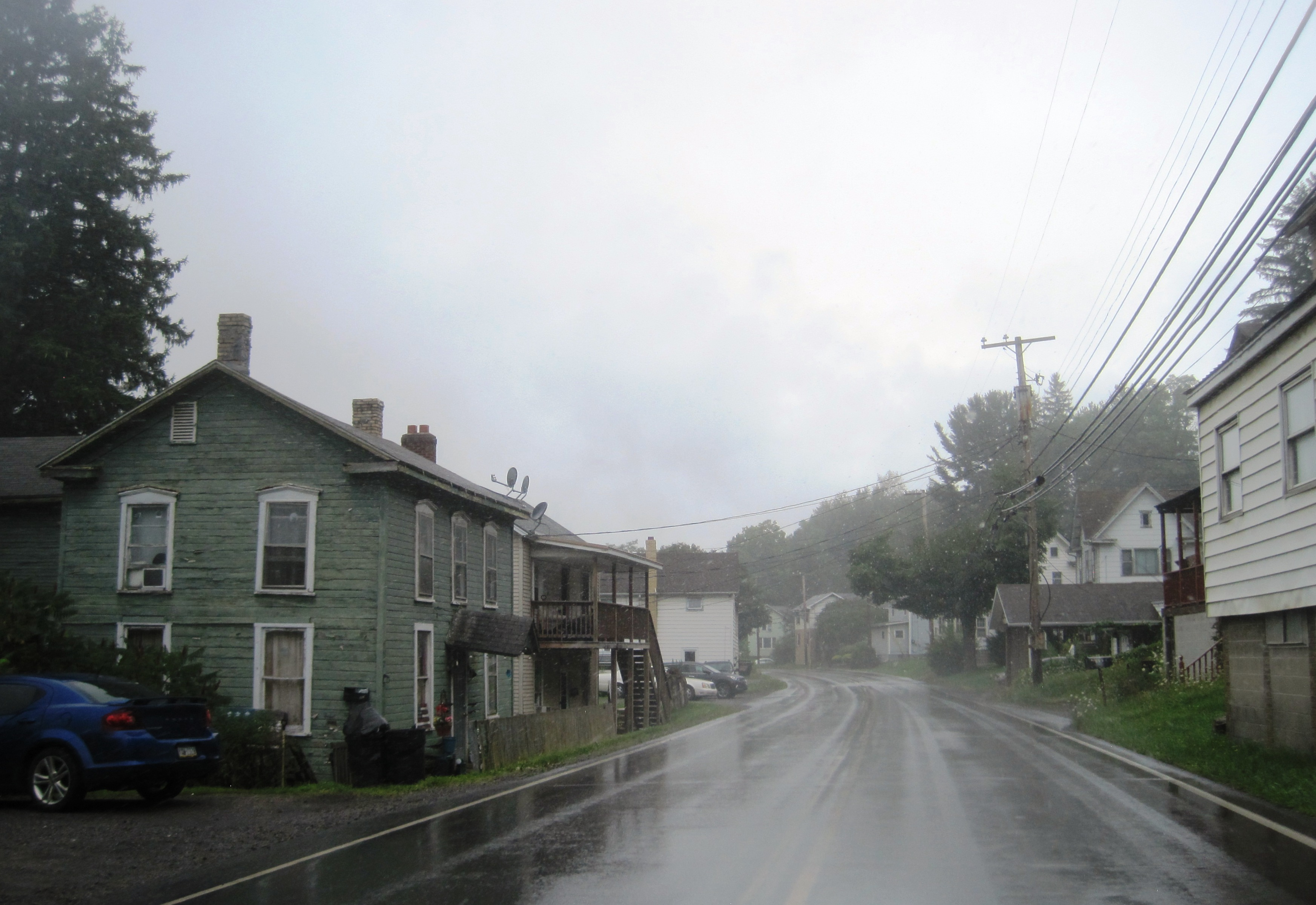
- PA 53 southbound in the Woodward Township village of West Moshannon

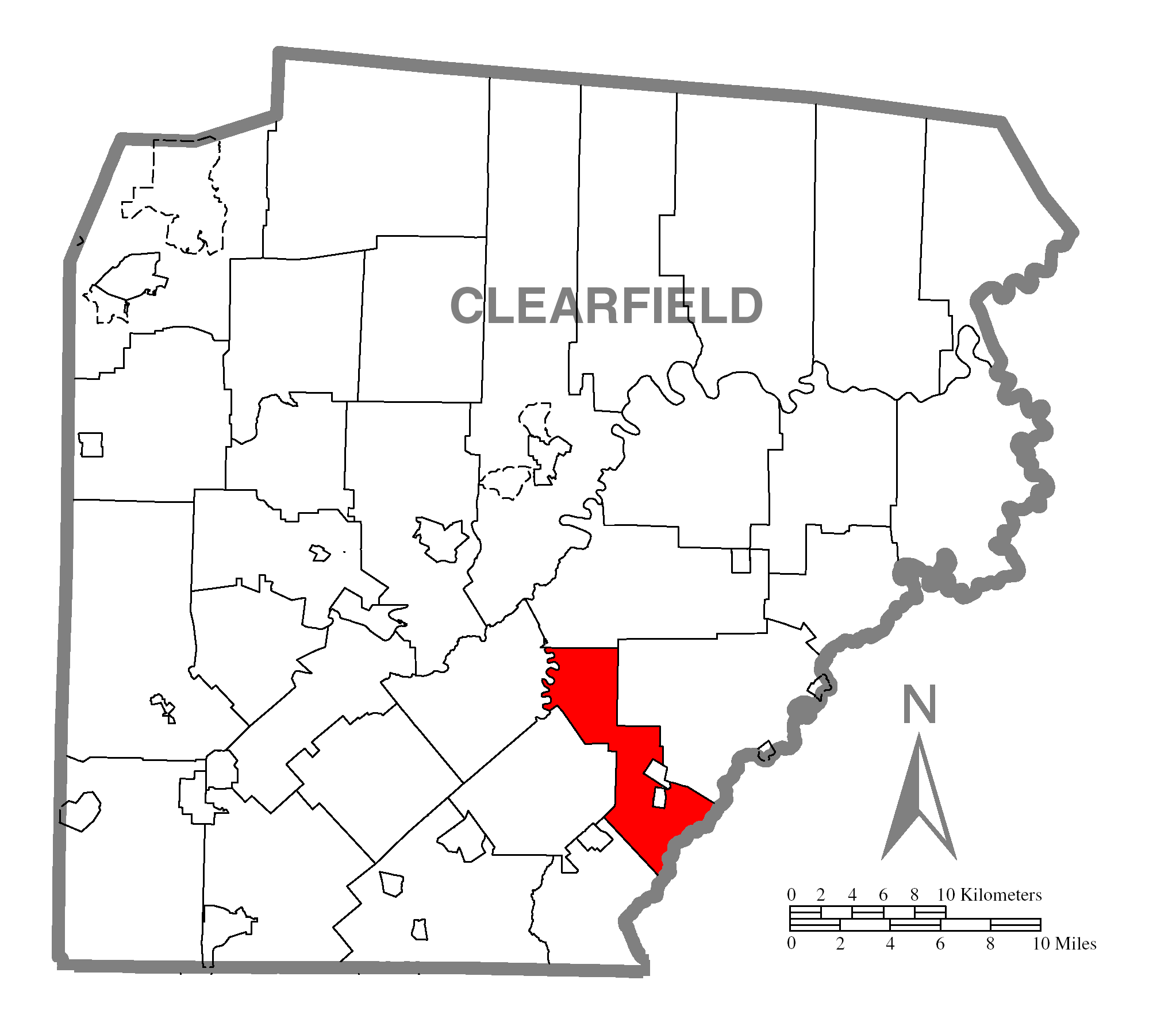
- Map of Clearfield County, Pennsylvania highlighting Woodward Township

- Map of Clearfield County, Pennsylvania
- Country: United States
- State: Pennsylvania
- County: Clearfield
- Settled: 1818
- Incorporated: 1848

Area
  - Total: 22.72 sq mi (58.85 km^{2})
  - Land: 22.57 sq mi (58.45 km^{2})
  - Water: 0.16 sq mi (0.41 km^{2})

Population (2020)
  - Total: 4,108 ▲
  - Estimate (2021): 4,099
  - Density: 178.5/sq mi (68.93/km^{2})
- Time zone: UTC-5 (Eastern (EST))
  - Summer (DST): UTC-4 (EDT)
- Area code: 814
- FIPS code: 42-033-86440

Woodward Township is a township in Clearfield County, Pennsylvania, United States. The population was 4,108 at the 2020 census.

== Geography ==
According to the United States Census Bureau, the township has a total area of 22.2 square miles (57.5 km^{2}), all land.

== Communities ==
- Faunce
- Hale
- Henderson
- Sanborn
- Sterling
- Whiteside
- West Moshannon

== Demographics ==
Historical population
Census	Pop.	Note	%±
2000	3,550		—
2010	3,992		12.5%
2020	4,108		2.9%
2021 (est.)	4,099		−0.2%
U.S. Decennial Census

As of the census of 2000, there were 3,550 people, 754 households, and 500 families residing in the township. The population density was 159.9 inhabitants per square mile (61.7/km^{2}). There were 863 housing units at an average density of 38.9 per square mile (15.0/km^{2}). The racial makeup of the township was 67.94% White, 26.90% African American, 0.11% Native American, 0.34% Asian, 4.62% from other races, and 0.08% from two or more races. Hispanic or Latino of any race were 4.76% of the population. The census information includes the prison population of SCI Houtzdale, which is located within the township.

There were 754 households, out of which 28.5% had children under the age of 18 living with them, 53.7% were married couples living together, 8.9% had a female householder with no husband present, and 33.6% were non-families. 30.8% of all households were made up of individuals, and 16.2% had someone living alone who was 65 years of age or older. The average household size was 2.32 and the average family size was 2.88.

In the township the population was spread out, with 12.2% under the age of 18, 11.7% from 18 to 24, 45.6% from 25 to 44, 21.0% from 45 to 64, and 9.5% who were 65 years of age or older. The median age was 36 years. For every 100 females, there were 285.5 males. For every 100 females age 18 and over, there were 329.3 males.

The median income for a household in the township was $30,513, and the median income for a family was $36,875. Males had a median income of $17,003 versus $16,700 for females. The per capita income for the township was $13,062. About 12.2% of families and 14.7% of the population were below the poverty line, including 22.6% of those under age 18 and 13.1% of those age 65 or over.

== Education ==
Woodward Township is served by the Moshannon Valley School District.
