= Moshannon Valley =

Coordinates: 40°51′N 77°37′W

Moshannon Valley, Pennsylvania
- Region
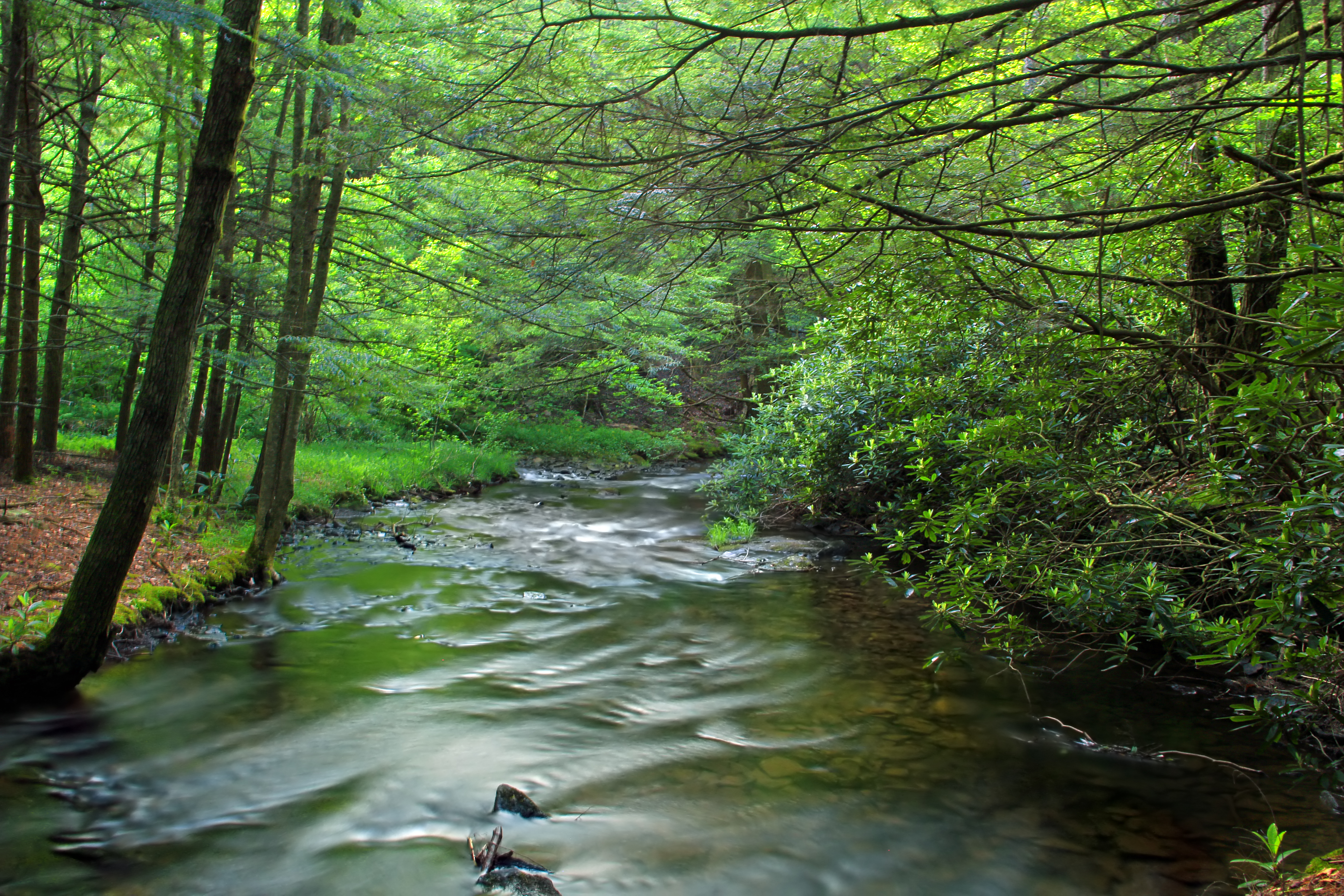
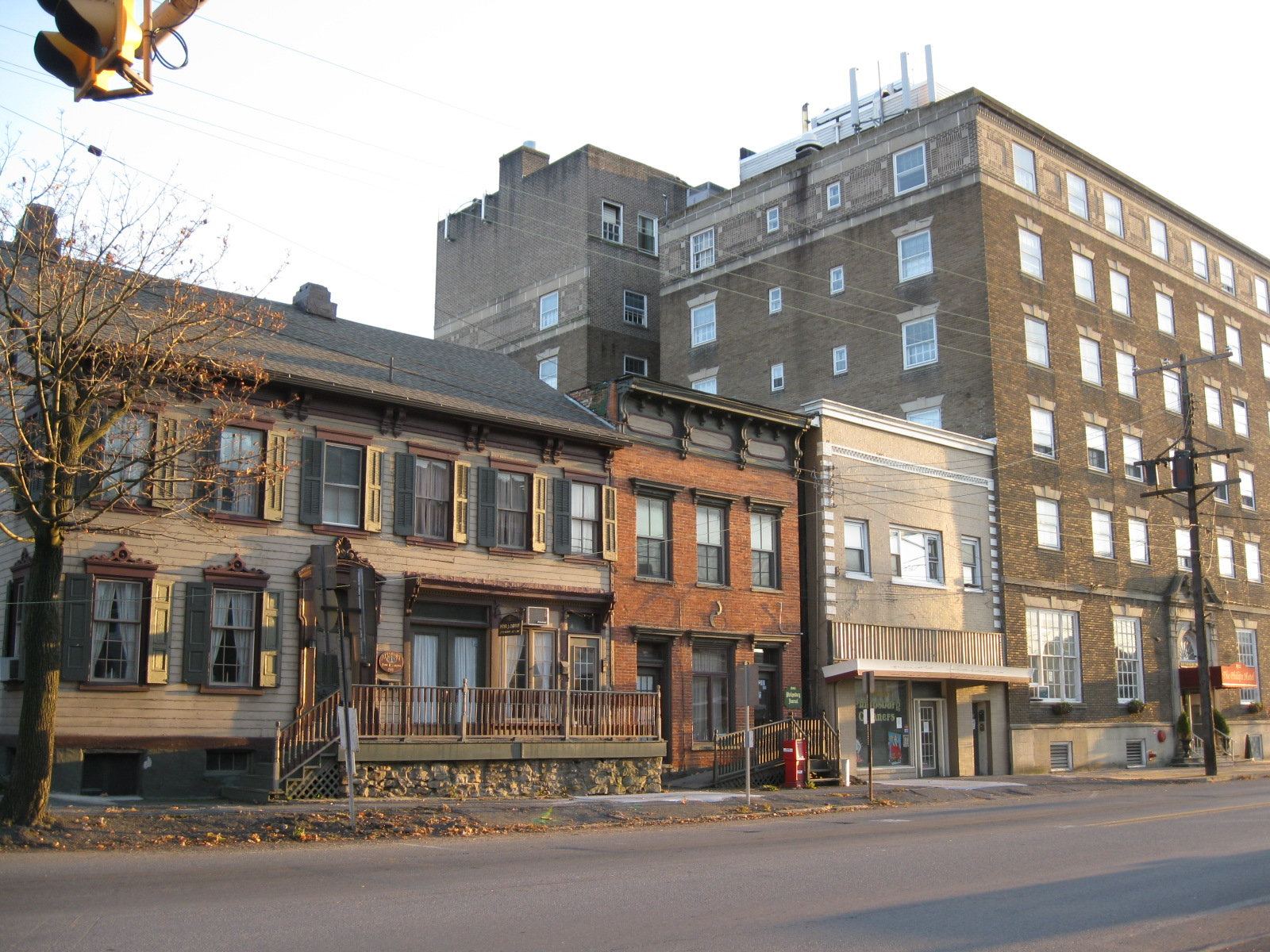
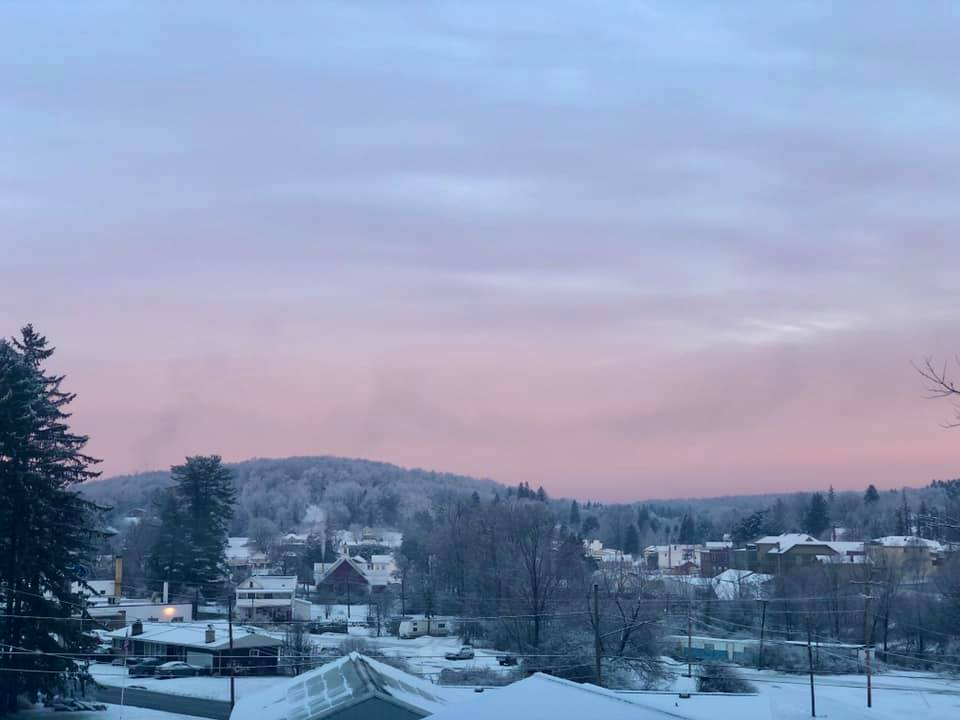
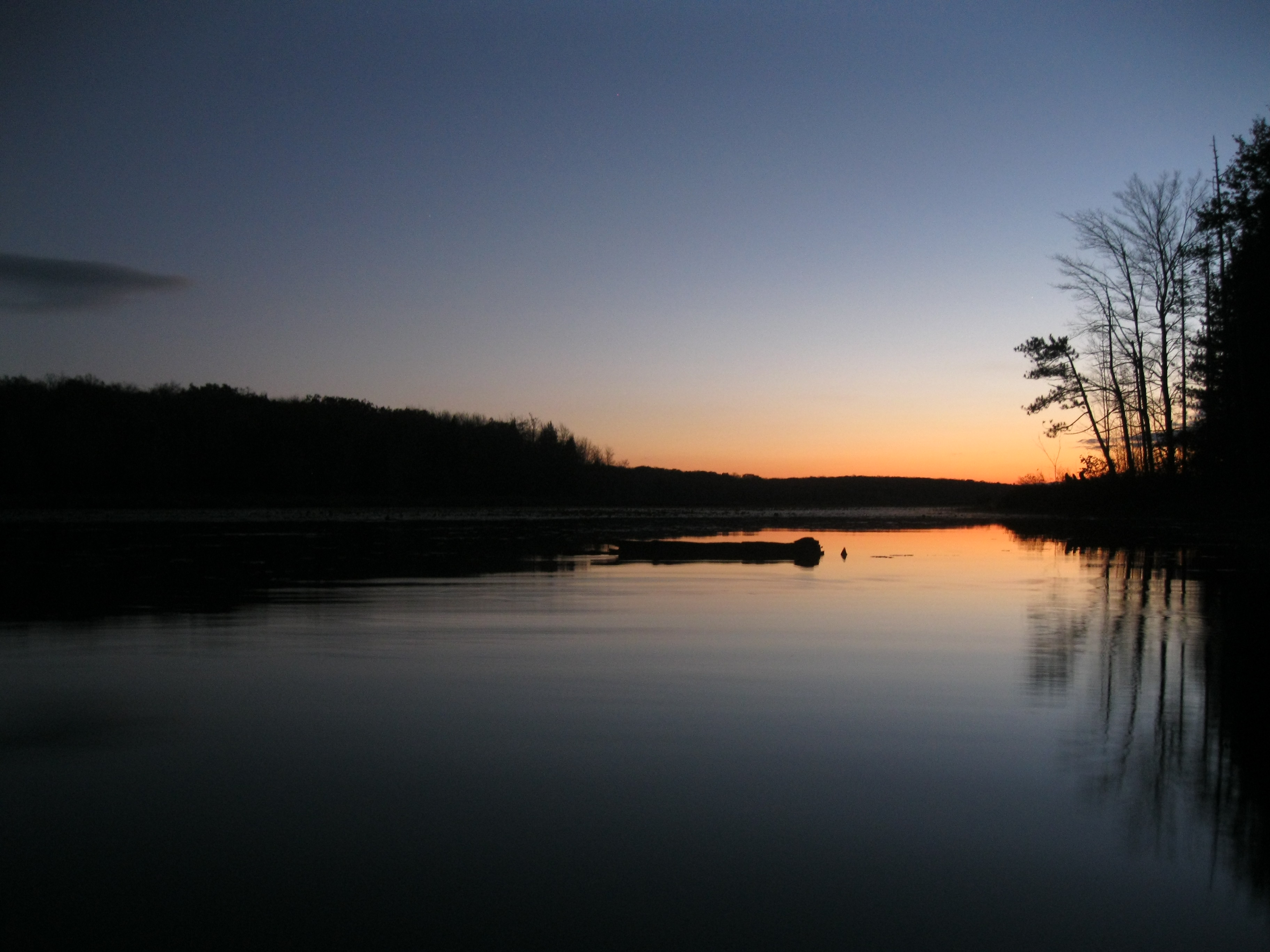
- Six Mile Run Philipsburg Borough Houtzdale Borough Black Moshannon lake at sunset

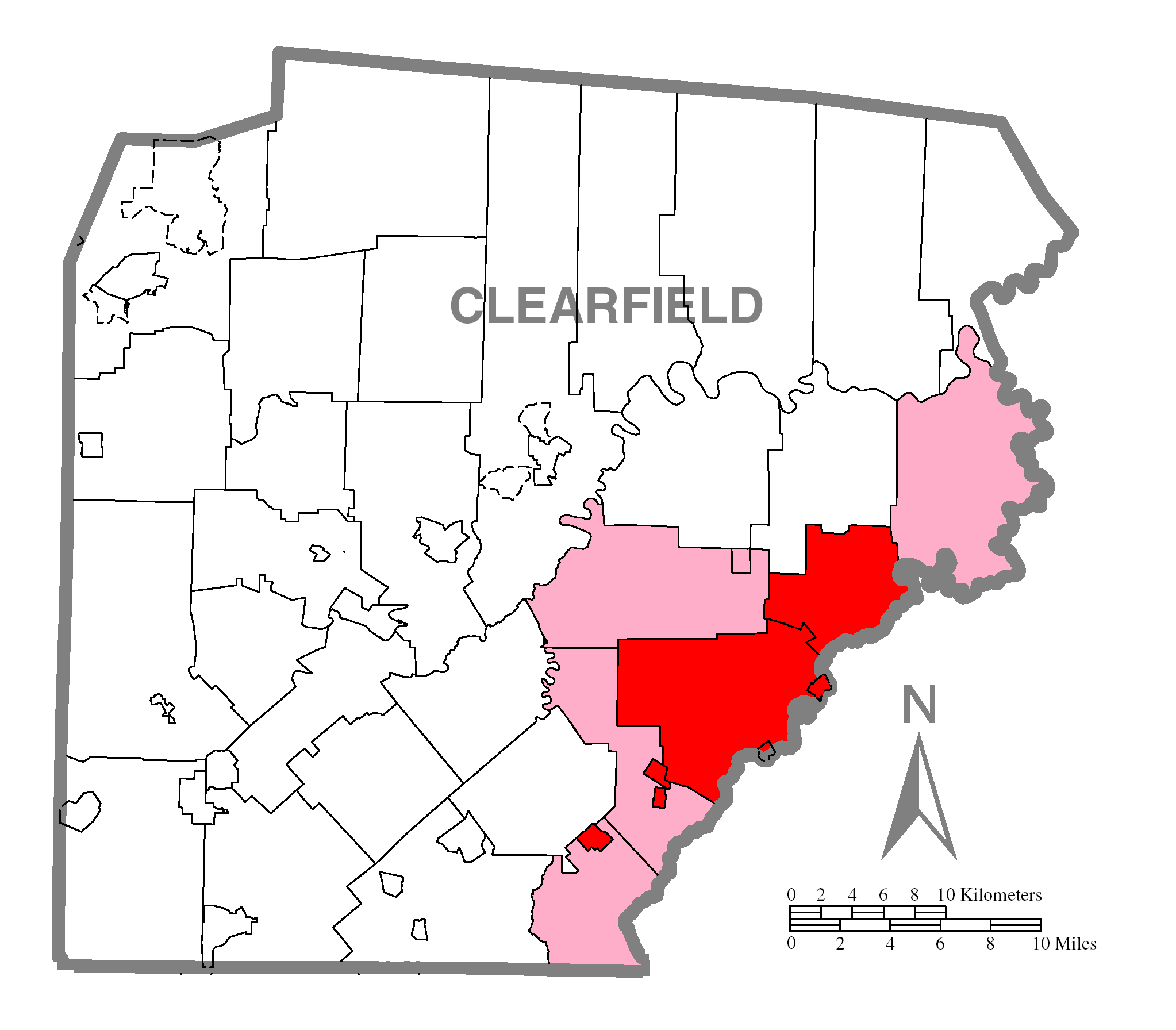
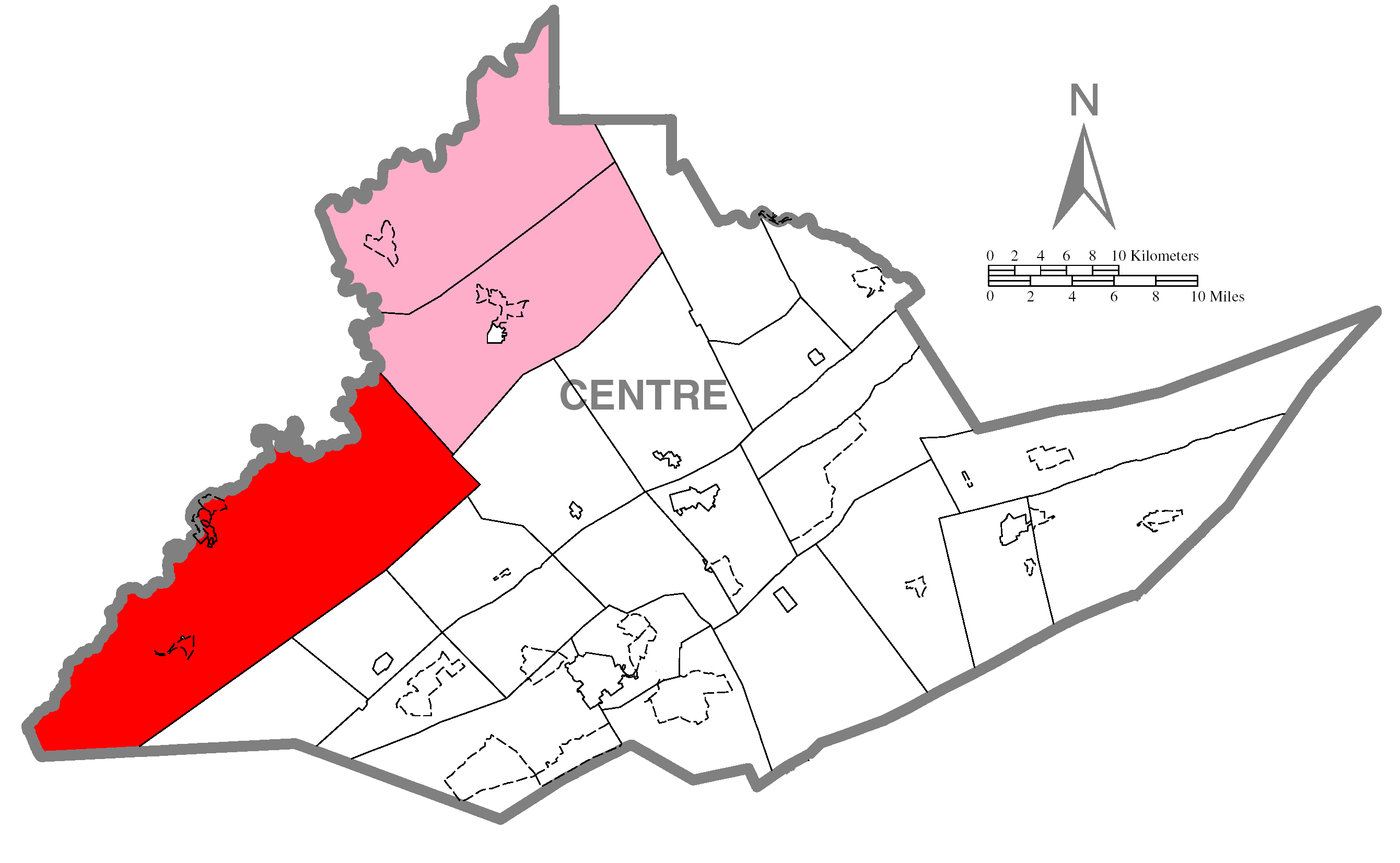
- Map of Moshannon Valley, Clearfield County Map of Moshannon Valley, Centre County
- Country: United States
- State: Pennsylvania
- County: Centre, Clearfield
- Time zone: UTC-5 (Eastern (EST))
  - Summer (DST): UTC-4 (EDT)
- Area code: 814

Moshannon Valley is a river valley in the Allegheny Plateau split between Centre County and Clearfield County.

== History ==
The Lenape word for Moshannon, Mos'hanna'unk, means "elk river place".

Philipsburg was laid out in 1797 and is now the largest municipality in Moshannon Valley. Many of the valleys early White settlers arrived under the false pretenses that the Moshannon Creek was navigable.

In April 2006, Pennsylvania's first private prison was opened in Decatur Township. After the prison closed in 2021 it reopened as an immigration detention center, becoming the largest ICE facility in the Northeastern US.

== Geography ==
The Moshannon Valley is in the Allegheny Plateau.

The Moshannon Creek is a tributary of the West Branch of the Susquehanna River. The creek marks the border between Clearfield and Centre County.

== Parks and Recreation ==
Black Moshannon State Park is Pennsylvania State Park in Rush Township. The park is centered around a bog habitat. The word "black" refers to the dark stained waters, which come from the presence of peat moss.

Other parks include the Cold Stream Dam & Recreation Park in Philipsburg.

== Municipalities ==
=== Boroughs ===
- Brisbin
- Chester Hill
- Glen Hope
- Houtzdale
- Osceola Mills
- Philipsburg
- Ramey
- Wallaceton

=== Townships ===
- Bigler Township
- Boggs Township
- Burnside Township
- Cooper Township
- Decatur Township
- Gulich Township
- Morris Township
- Snow Shoe Township
- Rush Township
- Woodward Township

=== Census-designated places ===
- Allport
- Casanova
- Grassflat
- Hawk Run
- Lanse
- Madera
- Morrisdale
- Moshannon
- North Philipsburg
- Sandy Ridge
- South Philipsburg
- West Decatur

=== Unincorporated villages ===
- Antes
- Arctic Spring
- Cooper Settlement
- Cuba Mines
- Drane
- Drifting
- Earnestville
- Gearhartville
- Glass City
- Gorton
- Graham
- Hale
- Janesville
- Kendrick
- Loch Lomond Junction
- New Town
- Morann
- Munson
- Pardee
- Panther Hollow
- Parsonsville
- Peale
- Penn Five
- Scotch Hollow
- Spike Island
- Stumptown
- Twigg Settlement
- Victor
- Winburne
- West Moshannon

== Education ==
The Moshannon Valley is served by the Moshannon Valley School District, Philipsburg-Osceola School District, Bald Eagle Area School District, and the West Branch Area School District.

== Infrastructure ==
=== Roads ===
- Interstate 80
- U.S. Route 322
- Pennsylvania Route 53
- Pennsylvania Route 153
- Pennsylvania Route 253
- Pennsylvania Route 350
- Pennsylvania Route 504

=== Air ===
Mid-State Airport was built on land taken from Black Moshannon State Park and Moshannon State Forest just before the Second World War, and was operational by 1942, hosting a Civil Air Patrol training exercise for nearly 300 planes on May 30, 1942.

=== Prisons ===
- Moshannon Valley Correctional Center
- SCI Houtzdale
