= Philipsburg-Osceola Area School District =

School district in Pennsylvania

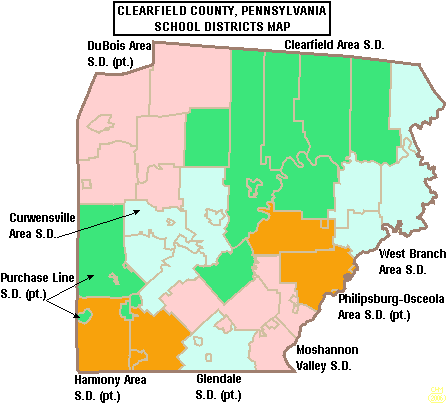

Location
- Pennsylvania; United States

District information
- Type: Public
- Grades: K-12
- Superintendent: Dr. Greg Paladina
- School board: Rob Miller, Mel Curtis, Rob Massung, Linda Bush, Todd Jeffries, Dana Droll, Rebecca Timchak, Susan McGee and Nancy Lamb.

Students and staff
- District mascot: Mounties
- Colors: blue and white

Other information
- Website: pomounties.org

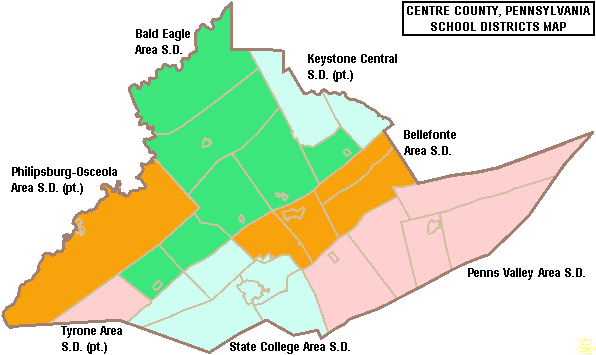
School District region in Centre County

The Philipsburg-Osceola Area School District is a public school district serving the portions of Centre County, Pennsylvania and Clearfield County, Pennsylvania. It encompasses the Centre County municipalities of Phillipsburg Boro and Rush Township, as well as the Clearfield County municipalities of Wallaceton Boro, Chester Hill Boro, Osceola Mills Boro, and the townships of Decatur, and Boggs.

== Schools ==
In the district, there are two elementary schools (grades K–4), a middle school (grades 5–8), and a senior high school (grades 9–12).

=== Elementary schools ===
- Osceola Mills, originally constructed in 1919 and has had several additions and renovations, the last being in 1995. The school is located at 400 Coal Street in Osceola Mills Boro..
- Phillipsburg is located at 1810 Black Moshannon Road in Rush Township, and was constructed in 2005 and is 70,000 square feet (6,500 m^{2})

=== Junior high school ===
The Philipsburg-Osceola Area Junior High, originally serving as North Lincoln Hill, was constructed in 1963 and was last renovated and modified in 2012-2014. The junior high is located at 200 Short Street in Phillipsburg Boro.

=== Senior high school ===
The Philipsburg-Osceola Area High School was built in 1959 and was last renovated and modified in 1999 when the 9th grade was moved to the building. The school is located at 502 Philips Street in Philipsburg Boro.

=== Other facilities ===
- Wallaceton-Boggs School - Built in 1956, 1973 addition, closed because of declining enrollment.
- North Lincoln Hill Elementary, closed and was renovated to be the junior high school
- Philipsburg-Osceola Junior High- Closed due to building problems

== Athletics ==
- Baseball - Class AA
- Basketball - Class AA
- Bowling - Class AAAA
- Cross Country - Class AA
- Football - Class AA
- Golf - Class AAAA
- Soccer - Class AA
- Softball - Class AA
- Track and Field - Class AA
- Volleyball - Class AA
