= Philipsburg-Osceola School District =

School district in Pennsylvania, U.S.

Philipsburg-Osceola Area School District
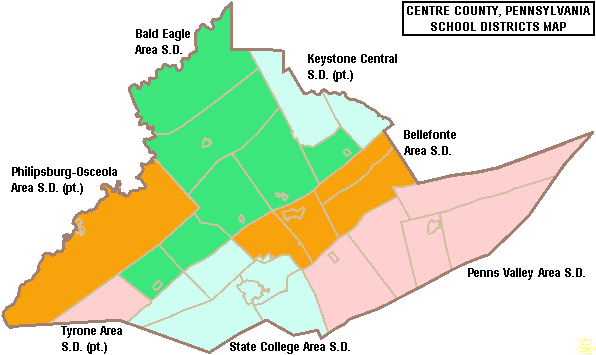

Address
- 200 Short Street Philipsburg, Centre County and Clearfield County, Pennsylvania, 16866-2640; United States
- Coordinates: 40.8891°N 78.2360°W

Students and staff
- District mascot: Mountie
- Colors: Navy Blue & White

Other information
- Website: pomounties.org

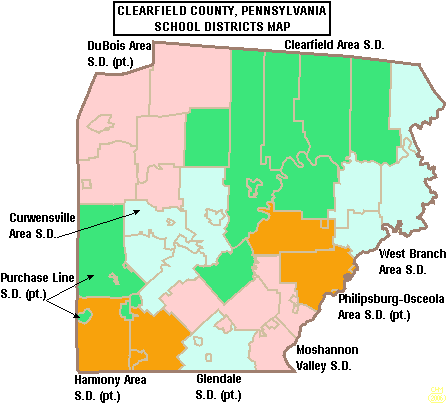
Map of Clearfield County, Pennsylvania School Districts showing a part of Philipsburg-Osceola School District

The Philipsburg-Osceola Area School District is a small, rural, public school district that is located in a region that straddles two central Pennsylvania counties.

In Centre County, it serves Rush Township and Philipsburg, Pennsylvania. In Clearfield County, it serves Wallaceton and Decatur Township, Chester Hill, Osceola Mills.

== History and demographics ==
This district was created by the joining of Osceola High School and Philipsburg High School. It encompasses approximately 222 square miles (570 km^{2}).

According to 2000 federal census data, it serves a resident population of 14,228. By 2010, the Philipsburg-Osceola Area School District's population grew to 15,410 people.

In 2009, the Philipsburg-Osceola Area School District residents’ per capita income was $15,752, while the median family income was $36,746. In the Commonwealth, the median family income was $49,501 and the United States median family income was $49,445, in 2010.

== District Schools ==
There are four schools operating in the Philipsburg-Osceola Area School District.

- Philipsburg-Osceola Area High School
- Philipsburg-Osceola Middle School
- Philipsburg Elementary School
- Osceola Mills Elementary School

== Extracurriculars ==
The school offers a variety of clubs, activities and an extensive sports program.

=== Sports ===
The District funds:

Boys

- Baseball - AA
- Basketball- AA
- Cross Country - AA
- Football - AA
- Golf - AA
- Soccer - AA
- Track and Field - AA
- Wrestling - AAA

Girls

- Basketball - AA
- Cheer - AAAA
- Cross Country - AAA
- Golf - AA
- Soccer (Fall) - AA
- Softball - AA
- Track and Field - AA
- Volleyball - AA

Junior high school sports

Boys

- Basketball
- Football
- Soccer
- Track and Field
- Wrestling

Girls

- Basketball
- Softball
- Soccer (fall)
- Track and Field

According to PIAA directory July 2012
