= Billy Test =

American jazz musician (born 1989)

- Born: William Lynn Test; February 21, 1989 (age 37); Philipsburg, Pennsylvania, Pennsylvania, U.S.
- Education: Philipsburg-Osceola Area High; State College Area High School; William Paterson University
- Occupation: Musician
- Years active: 2009 – present
- Website: billytest.com

William Lynn "Billy" Test (born February 21, 1989) is an American jazz pianist, composer and arranger. Since 2019, he has been the pianist in residence with the WDR Big Band.

== Early life and career ==
Born on February 21, 1989, in Philipsburg, Pennsylvania, Test is one of two sons born to Susan and Lynn Test, the latter a well-regarded teacher at the high school both his sons attended, Philipsburg-Osceola Area High. Following his death, the family moved to State College, Pennsylvania, where Test completed his secondary education at State College Area High School, class of 2007. He later attended William Paterson University.

In July 2002, at Philipsburg's Rowland Theater, in a concert staged to benefit cancer research and attended by the former first couple, Jimmy and Rosalynn Carter (whose reception was reportedly "rivaled only" by that given Test), the then-13-year-old pianist, although initially tasked with performing the national anthem, was delighted to shift gears when the opportunity presented itself to accompany Cahal Dunne's "moving rendition" of Andrew Lloyd Webber's Music of the Night".

In December 2009, while attending William Patterson University, Test joined fellow students Alex Chilowicz (the featured soloist on tenor sax) and drummer Arthur Vint, as well as faculty members Steve LaSpina (bass), Paul Meyers (guitar), Rich DeRosa (conductor), and members of the Manhattan School of Music Jazz Philharmonic Orchestra, performing numerous standards as arranged by DeRosa, as well as Chilowicz's own arrangement of "Manhã de Carnaval".

For almost a decade, beginning in 2011, Test became an increasingly familiar face at the Monroe County jazz club Deer Head Inn, featured frequently on Sundays, often teamed with reedman Jay Rattman. He has also worked there with vocalist Giacomo Gates, saxophonist Dave Liebman, bass player / vocalist Nancy Reed, and in a trio with bassist Evan Gregor and drummer Ian Froman The work of another Deer Head regular, of considerably longer standing, pianist / composer-arranger John Coates Jr., has formed the basis for at least three tribute / deep dives staged by Test and Rattway.

The aforementioned Sunday time slot proved particularly fortuitous on February 21, 2016, as the gig co-starring Rattman and advertised as "Billy's Birthday Bash", afforded fans a chance to help celebrate Test's 27th birthday.

Test was a recipient of the 2018 Herb Alpert Young Jazz Composer Award. Since January 2025, he has also been on the faculty of Conservatorium Maastricht,
