= Spike Island, Centre County, Pennsylvania =

Unincorporated community in Pennsylvania, US

Spike Island, Pennsylvania
- Unincorporated community
- Location within the U.S. state of Pennsylvania Spike Island (the United States)
- Coordinates: 40°50′38.21″N 78°16′6.05″W
- Country: United States
- State: Pennsylvania
- County: Centre
- Township: Rush
- Elevation: 1,506 ft (459 m)
- Time zone: UTC-5 (Eastern (EST))
  - Summer (DST): UTC-4 (EDT)
- ZIP code: 16666
- GNIS feature ID: 1188174

Spike Island is a hamlet and an unincorporated community in Rush Township, Centre County, Pennsylvania, United States. It is part of Philipsburg-Osceola School District, and the Pennsylvania Wilds. The hamlet is south of Osceola Mills, Clearfield County and the Moshannon Creek, west of Trout Run, and north of Penn Five.

The Spike Island Pirates, a local baseball team, represent the hamlet, although the team plays at the Philipsburg High School. The team is a part of the Centre County Baseball League, Pennsylvania's oldest amateur baseball league, which began in 1932.
