= New Castle, Clearfield County, Pennsylvania =

New Castle, Pennsylvania
- Unincorporated community
- Location within Pennsylvania
- Coordinates: 40°52′40″N 78°20′33″W
- Country: United States
- State: Pennsylvania
- County: Clearfield
- Elevation: 1,998 ft (609 m)
- Time zone: Eastern (EST)
  - Summer (DST): EDT
- GNIS feature ID: 1213543

New Castle is an unincorporated place in Decatur Township, Clearfield County, Pennsylvania. It is located between West Decatur and Houtzdale.
