= Philipsburg Historic District (Philipsburg, Pennsylvania) =

Historic district in Pennsylvania, United States

- U.S. National Register of Historic Places
- U.S. Historic district
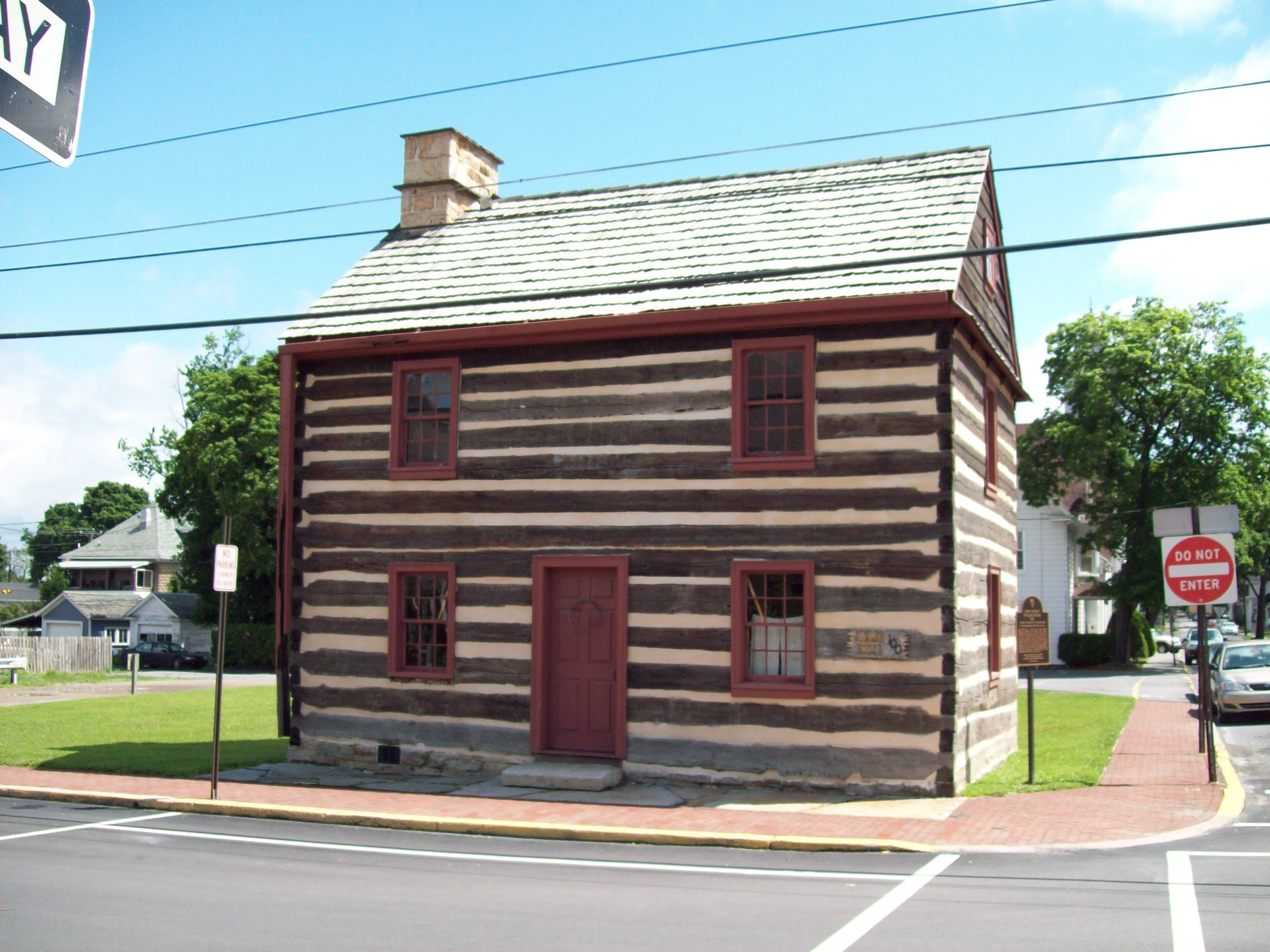
- Simler House, Philipsburg Historic District, June 2009

- Location within Pennsylvania Location within the United States
- Location: Roughly bounded by East Presqueisle St., Hillcrest Dr., Oak, Railroad, Spruce and Laurel Sts., Philipsburg, Pennsylvania
- Coordinates: 40°54′0″N 78°13′0″W
- Area: 99.9 acres (40.4 ha)
- Built: 1864
- Architect: Congdon and Sons, Henry M.; Millard, Julian
- Architectural style: Greek Revival, Queen Anne
- NRHP reference No.: 99000881
- Added to NRHP: July 22, 1999

The Philipsburg Historic District is a national historic district that is located in Philipsburg, Centre County, Pennsylvania.

It was added to the National Register of Historic Places in 1999.

== History and architectural features ==
This district includes 228 contributing buildings and two contributing sites that are located in the central business district and surrounding residential areas of Philipsburg. The oldest house is the John Henry Simler House (1807). Notable non-residential buildings include the Town Hall (1887), U.S. Post Office (1935), Union Church (1820-1840), St. Paul's Episcopal Church (1911), First Presbyterian Church (1908), and New Life Center Church (1893).

The contributing sites are two small parks that are situated at the center of Philipsburg. Also located in the district are the separately listed Hardman Philips House, Rowland Theater, and Union Church and Burial Ground.

== Gallery ==
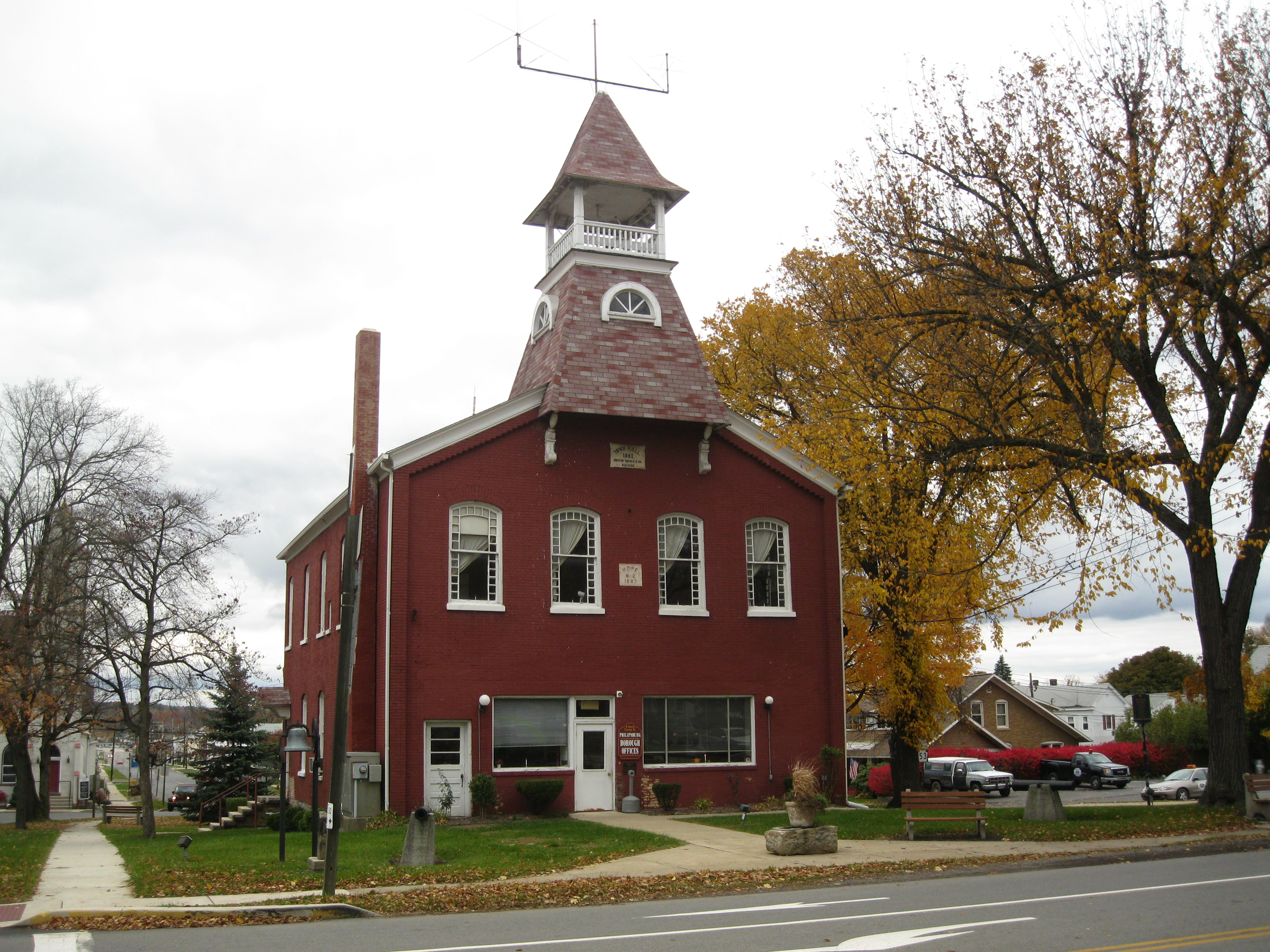
Town Hall

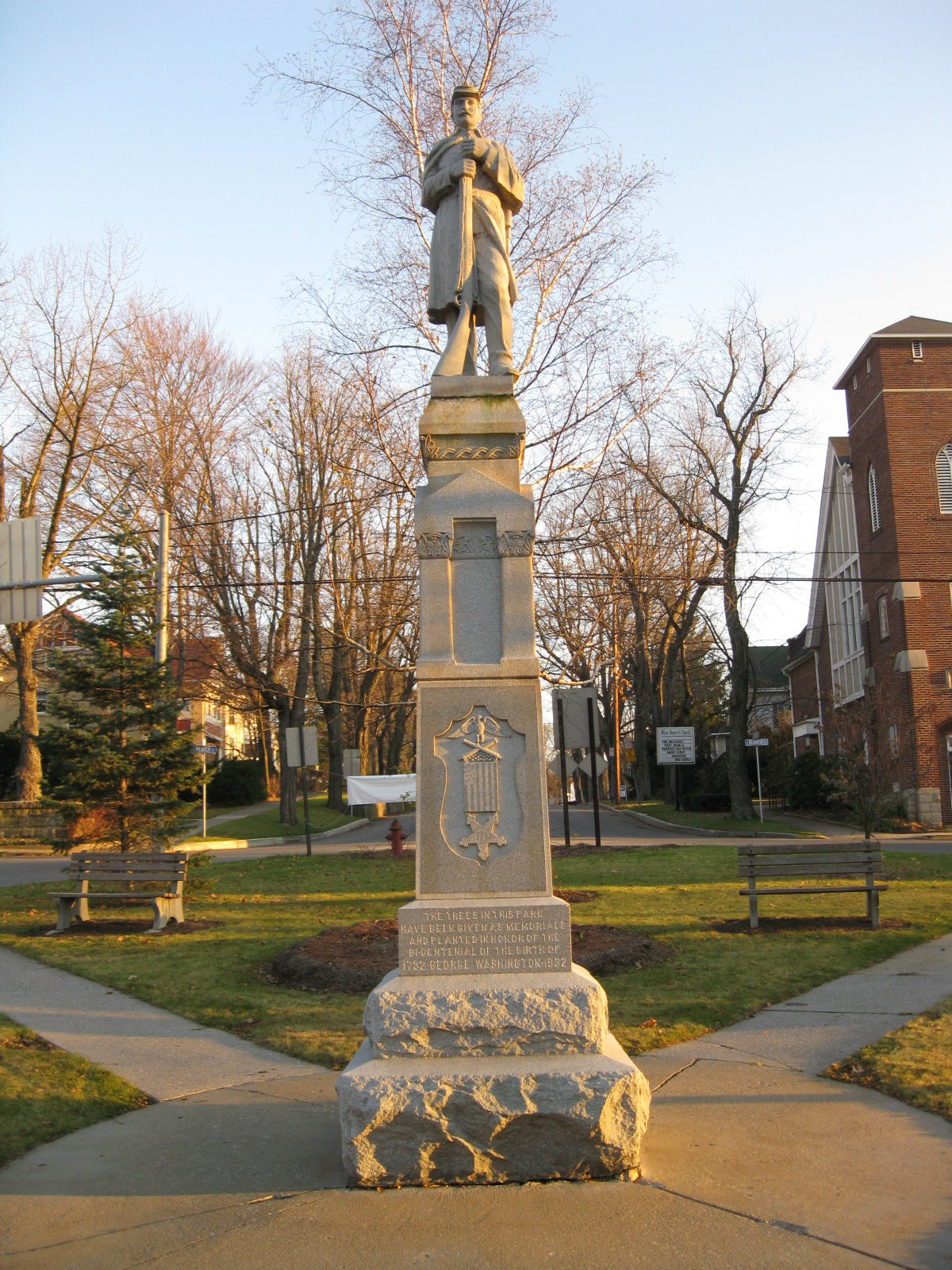
Civil War memorial
