= Casanova, Pennsylvania =

Unincorporated community in Pennsylvania, US

- Census-designated place
- Location within Pennsylvania Location within the United States
- Coordinates: 40°57′16″N 78°10′4″W
- Country: United States
- State: Pennsylvania
- County: Centre
- Township: Rush

Area
  - Total: 0.66 sq mi (1.70 km^{2})
  - Land: 0.66 sq mi (1.70 km^{2})
  - Water: 0 sq mi (0.00 km^{2})
- Elevation: 1,405 ft (428 m)

Population (2020)
  - Total: 123
  - Density: 187.0/sq mi (72.19/km^{2})
- Time zone: UTC-5 (Eastern (EST))
  - Summer (DST): UTC-4 (EDT)
- ZIP Code: 16860 (Munson)
- Area codes: 814/582
- FIPS code: 42-11544
- GNIS feature ID: 2805472

Casanova is an unincorporated community and census-designated place (CDP) in Centre County, Pennsylvania, United States. It was first listed as a CDP before the 2020 census.

The CDP is along the northwestern border of Centre County, in the northern part of Rush Township. It sits within a large bend of Moshannon Creek, which borders the community to the west, north, and east. Across the creek is Clearfield County, with Morris Township to the west and Cooper Township to the north and east. The unincorporated community of Munson is directly to the west across Moshannon Creek. The creek is a northeastward-flowing tributary of the West Branch Susquehanna River.

Casanova Road is the community's main street; it leads west across Moshannon Creek into Munson and southeast 7 miles (11 km) to Pennsylvania Route 504 at Black Moshannon State Park.

== Demographics ==
Historical population
| Census | Pop. | Note | %± |
|---|---|---|---|
| 2020 | 123 | | — |
U.S. Decennial Census
