= Jon Condo =

American football player (born 1981)

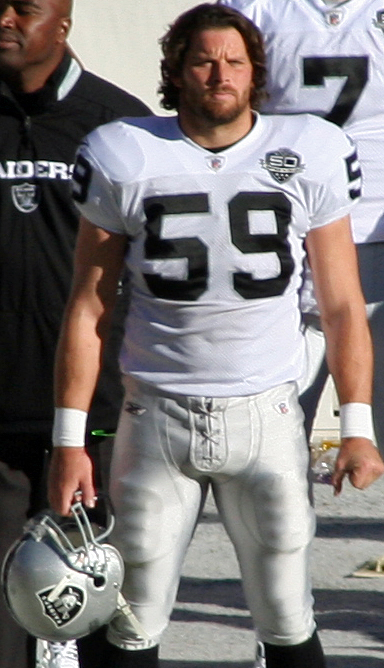
- Condo with the Oakland Raiders in 2009

No. 46, 59
- Position: Long snapper

Personal information
- Born: August 26, 1981 (age 45); Philipsburg, Pennsylvania, U.S.
- Listed height: 6 ft 3 in (1.91 m)
- Listed weight: 245 lb (111 kg)

Career information
- High school: Philipsburg-Osceola
- College: Maryland (2001–2004)
- NFL draft: 2005: undrafted

Career history
- Dallas Cowboys (2005); New England Patriots (2006)*; Oakland Raiders (2006–2017); Atlanta Falcons (2018); San Francisco 49ers (2019)
- * Offseason or practice squad member only

Awards and highlights
- 2× Pro Bowl (2009, 2011)

Career NFL statistics
- Games played: 181
- Total tackles: 50
- Fumble recoveries: 4
- Stats at Pro Football Reference

Jonathan Condo (born August 26, 1981) is an American former professional football player who was a long snapper in the National Football League (NFL) for the Dallas Cowboys, Oakland Raiders, Atlanta Falcons and San Francisco 49ers. He played college football for the Maryland Terrapins was signed by the Cowboys as an undrafted free agent in 2005.

== Early life ==
Condo attended Philipsburg-Osceola Area High School. As a junior, he rushed for 1,008 yards and nine touchdowns, averaged 17 tackles per game and received All-conference honors as a running back, linebacker and punter. As a senior, he rushed for nearly 1,000 yards, had more than 100 tackles, 13 sacks and 3 interceptions. He set school career records for rushing yards (2,700) and tackles (374). He received first-team All-state honors at linebacker and All-Big 8 Conference honors at running back, linebacker and punter. He participated in the Big 33 Football Classic.

He was also an All-State selection in baseball as a catcher on the P-O baseball squad. As a senior, he was a state champion wrestler, winning the PIAA 275 lb championship in the AAA classification, finishing the year with only one blemish on his record.

== College career ==
Condo attended the University of Maryland, College Park, where he played for the Terrapins. He became the team's long snapper as a sophomore and also served as a backup defensive end.

He was the starter at long snapper for 38 straight games. As a senior, he appeared in all 13 games and received the team award for "Top Special Teams Performer", becoming the first pure long snapper to earn the honor in school history.

== Professional career ==
=== Dallas Cowboys ===
Condo was signed as an undrafted free agent by the Dallas Cowboys after 2005 NFL draft on April 29. He made the team as the long snapper over Jeff Robinson. Although he played in the first three games of the season, his struggles forced the team to waive him on September 28. He was replaced with L. P. Ladouceur.

=== New England Patriots ===
On January 17, 2006, he was signed to a futures contract by the New England Patriots. He was released on August 21.

=== Oakland Raiders ===
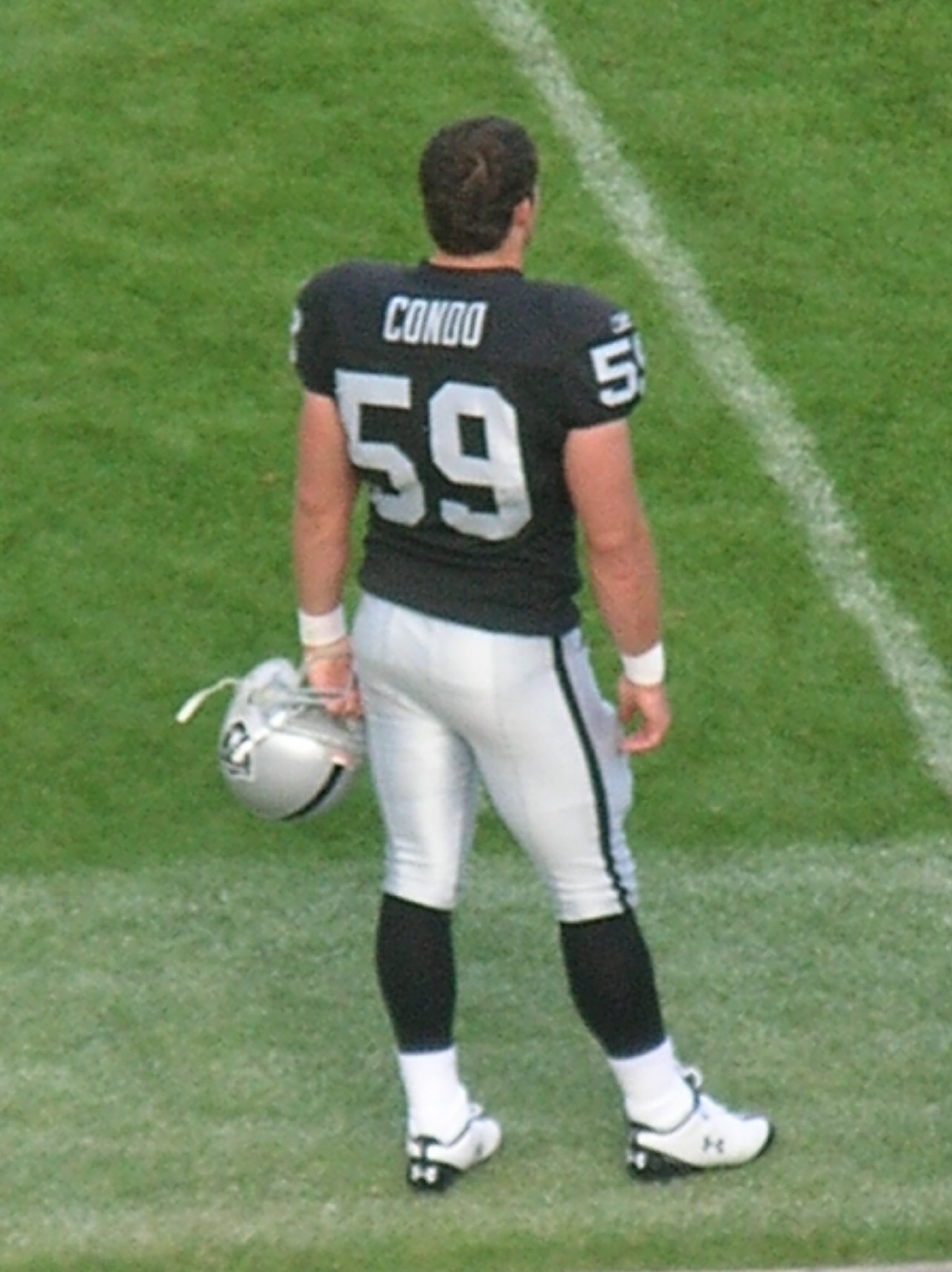
Condo in November 2008

On November 29, 2006, he was signed by the Oakland Raiders to their practice squad and would become the team's long snapper the next year.

Condo was an exclusive rights free agent in 2008, but the Raiders re-signed him. On October 19, in a game against the New York Jets, the Raiders were forced to punt on a 3 and out. Condo directly snapped the ball to outside linebacker Jon Alston, who ran it for 22 yards on a fake punt play. He was added to the Pro Bowl for 2010 after kicker Sebastian Janikowski made 33 field goals and punter Shane Lechler posted a 47.0 average.

On July 27, 2011, the Oakland Raiders re-signed Condo to a three-year deal. He was again selected to play in the 2012 Pro Bowl. He joined teammates punter Shane Lechler, kicker Sebastian Janikowski, and defensive lineman Richard Seymour.

On September 10, 2012, Condo left a game against the San Diego Chargers with a concussion. In his absence, the backup long snapper, Travis Goethel, botched two snaps and had another punt blocked. The Raiders went on to lose the game 22–14, and much of the blame was put on the special teams' miscues.

On August 4, 2013, Condo signed a three-year contract extension with the Oakland Raiders. On December 16, 2015, he was placed on the injured reserve list with a shoulder injury and was replaced with Thomas Gafford.

On March 20, 2017, he was re-signed by the Raiders. On March 14, 2018, Condo was not re-signed by the Raiders, and became a free agent.

=== Atlanta Falcons ===
On December 4, 2018, Condo was signed by the Atlanta Falcons to replace and injured Josh Harris. He appeared in the final four games and was not re-signed at the end of the season.

=== San Francisco 49ers ===
On September 17, 2019, Condo was signed by the San Francisco 49ers to replace a struggling Colin Holba. He announced his retirement on September 23, after one game played with the team, and was placed on the reserve/retired list. He was replaced with Garrison Sanborn.
