= Winburne, Pennsylvania =

Unincorporated community in Pennsylvania, US

- Unincorporated community
- Location within Pennsylvania
- Coordinates: 40°57′58″N 78°08′42″W
- Country: United States
- State: Pennsylvania
- County: Clearfield
- Elevation: 1,424 ft (434 m)
- Time zone: UTC-5 (Eastern (EST))
  - Summer (DST): UTC-4 (EDT)
- ZIP code: 16879
- Area code: 814
- GNIS feature ID: 1191562

Winburne is an unincorporated community in Clearfield County, Pennsylvania, United States. The community is located 6.2 miles (10.0 km) northeast of Philipsburg. Winburne has a post office with ZIP code 16879.

== History ==
It is unclear exactly when Winburne was founded, but we can estimate it between 1885 and 1886. One of the first persons to arrive at Winburne was Gust Adolph Johnson who of which built one of the first three homes on Winburne. Another prominent citizen of Winburne was Burton/Berten Merritt who came to Winburne in 1884.

James L. Sommerville a leader in the community came to the area in 1888. He was president of Bituminous National Bank, postmaster, superintendent of the school, and named the town.

Winburne was coined after the Wynn family that lived in the surrounding area, and "burn" being Scottish for stream. Wynnburn was the original spelling until October 5, 1889 when the post office changed the name to Winburne.

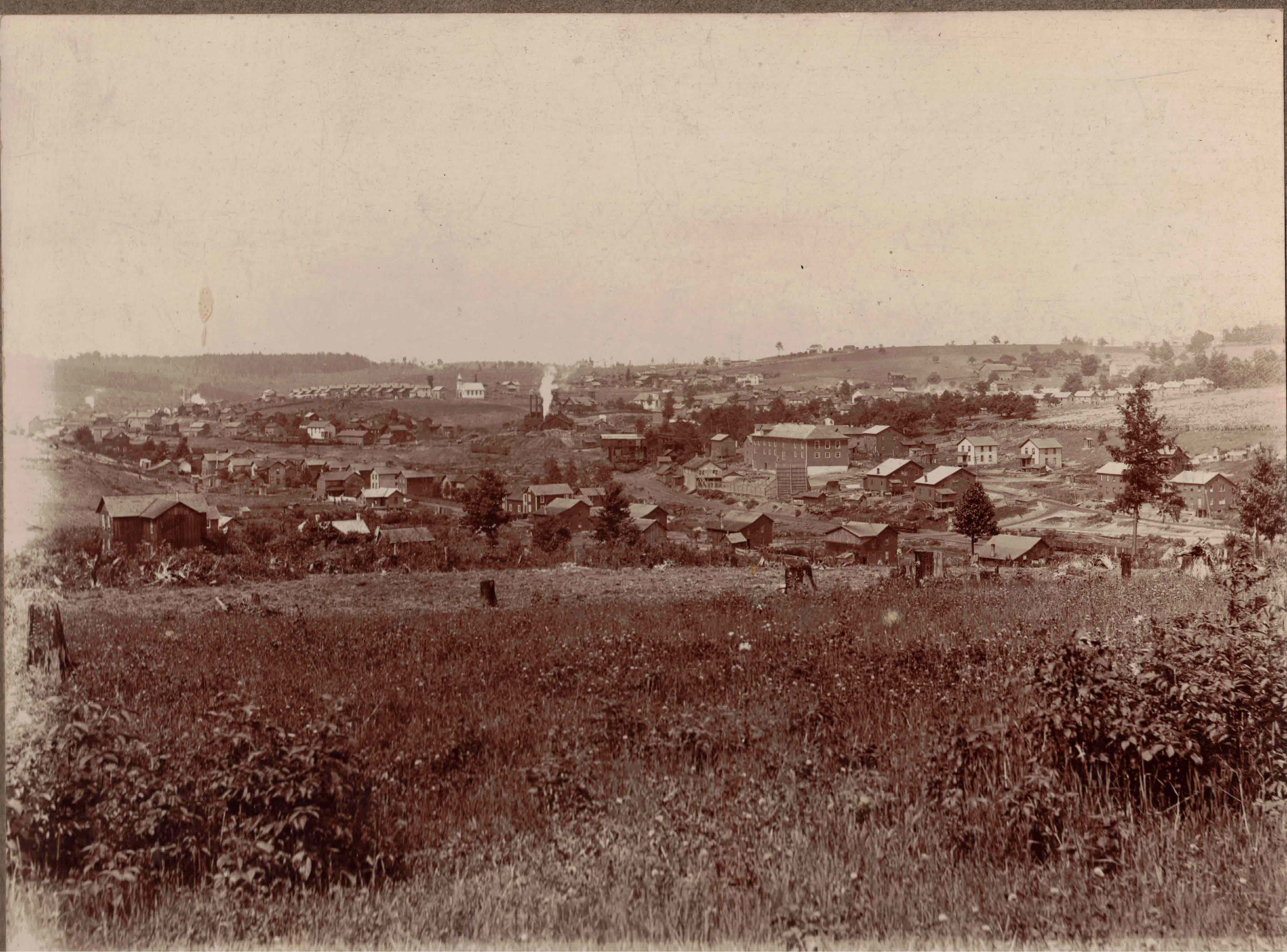
A bird's-eye view of Winburne 1891-1903.

In 1904 The Avondale Park opened with a crowd of 8,000 attending. The original Avondale Hotel burnt on October 7, 1912. The Avondale was rebuilt soon after and is currently still in operation.

== Demographics ==
Historical population
Census	Pop.	Note	%±

The United States Census Bureau defined Winburne as a census designated place (CDP) in 2023.
