= Union Church and Burial Ground =

Historic site in Centre County, Pennsylvania, US

- U.S. National Register of Historic Places
- Pennsylvania state historical marker
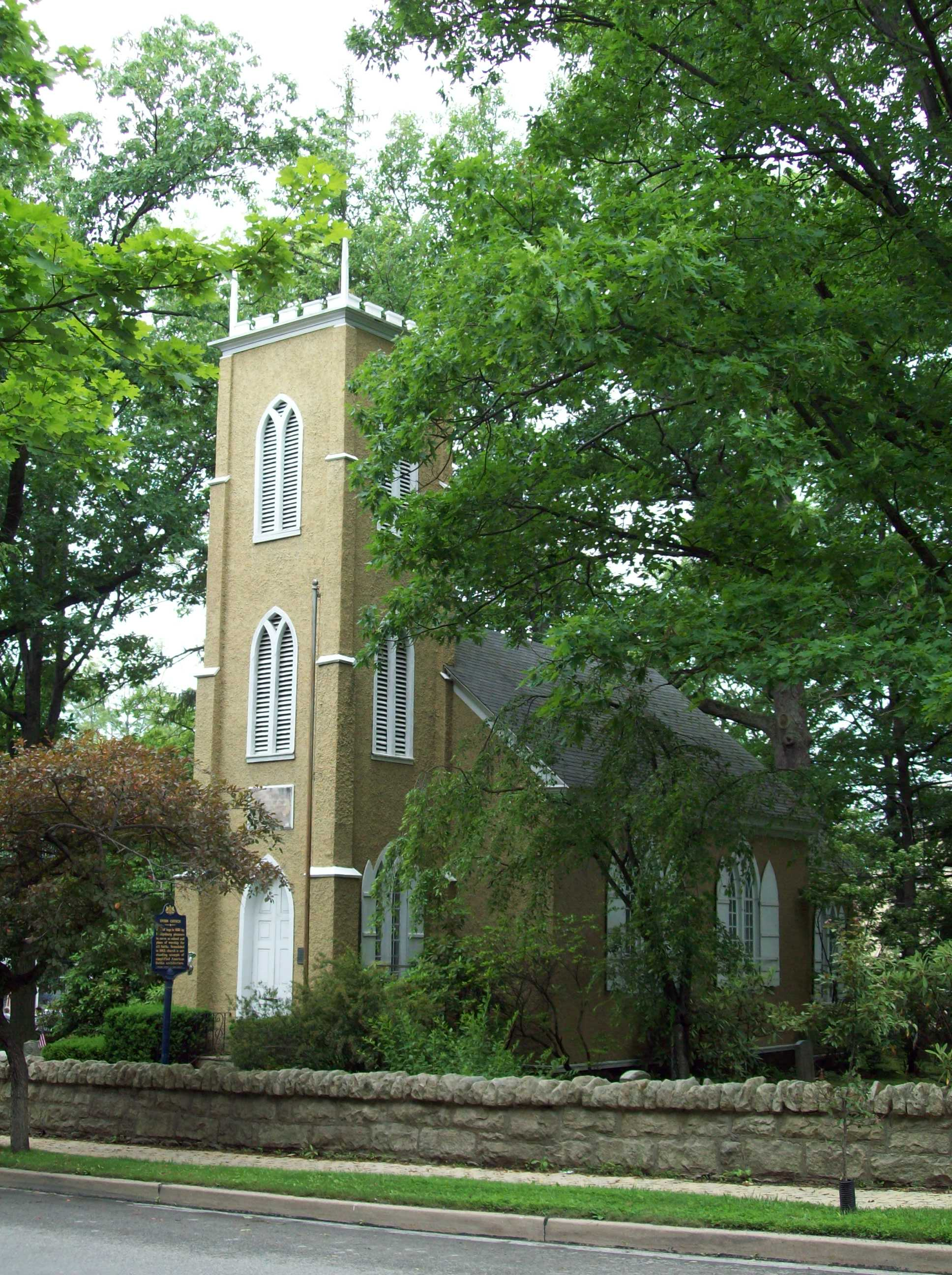

- Location within Pennsylvania Location within the United States
- Location: E. Presqueisle St., Philipsburg, Pennsylvania
- Coordinates: 40°53′53″N 78°13′4″W
- Area: 1 acre (0.40 ha)
- Built: 1820
- Architect: Turner, Samuel; Kinnear, William
- Architectural style: Gothic Revival, Gothic Revival vernacular
- NRHP reference No.: 78002365

Significant dates
- Added to NRHP: May 23, 1978
- Designated PHMC: November 02, 1967

The Union Church and Burial Ground (also known as the Old Mud Church) is an historic church and cemetery that is located on East Presqueisle Street in Philipsburg, Pennsylvania, United States.

The church and cemetery were added to the National Register of Historic Places in 1978. It is located in the Philipsburg Historic District.

== History and notable features ==
A log meetinghouse was built in 1820 by the fifty-seven residents of Philipsburg for a cost of $343. The building was used both as a school and as the community's first church, open to all Protestant ministers.

In 1842, the building was extensively rebuilt as a Gothic-style, Anglican church with a three-story entrance tower added to the front, a chancel added to the rear and the log walls of the meetinghouse incorporated into the main sanctuary. A rough mixture of plaster and clay stucco covers the church giving it its common name of the "Old Mud Church."

Hardman Philips had donated much of the money to rebuild the church and intended to make it an Episcopalian Church. After a lengthy lawsuit, the church continued to serve many denominations, including Episcopalians, Presbyterians, and Methodists. The last regular religious use was by Free Methodists during the early 1920s. The building has also been used as a local museum.

The cemetery is surrounded by a three-foot stone wall and contains a 330-year-old white oak known as the "Founder's Oak." The oldest grave dates to 1819.

== Gallery ==
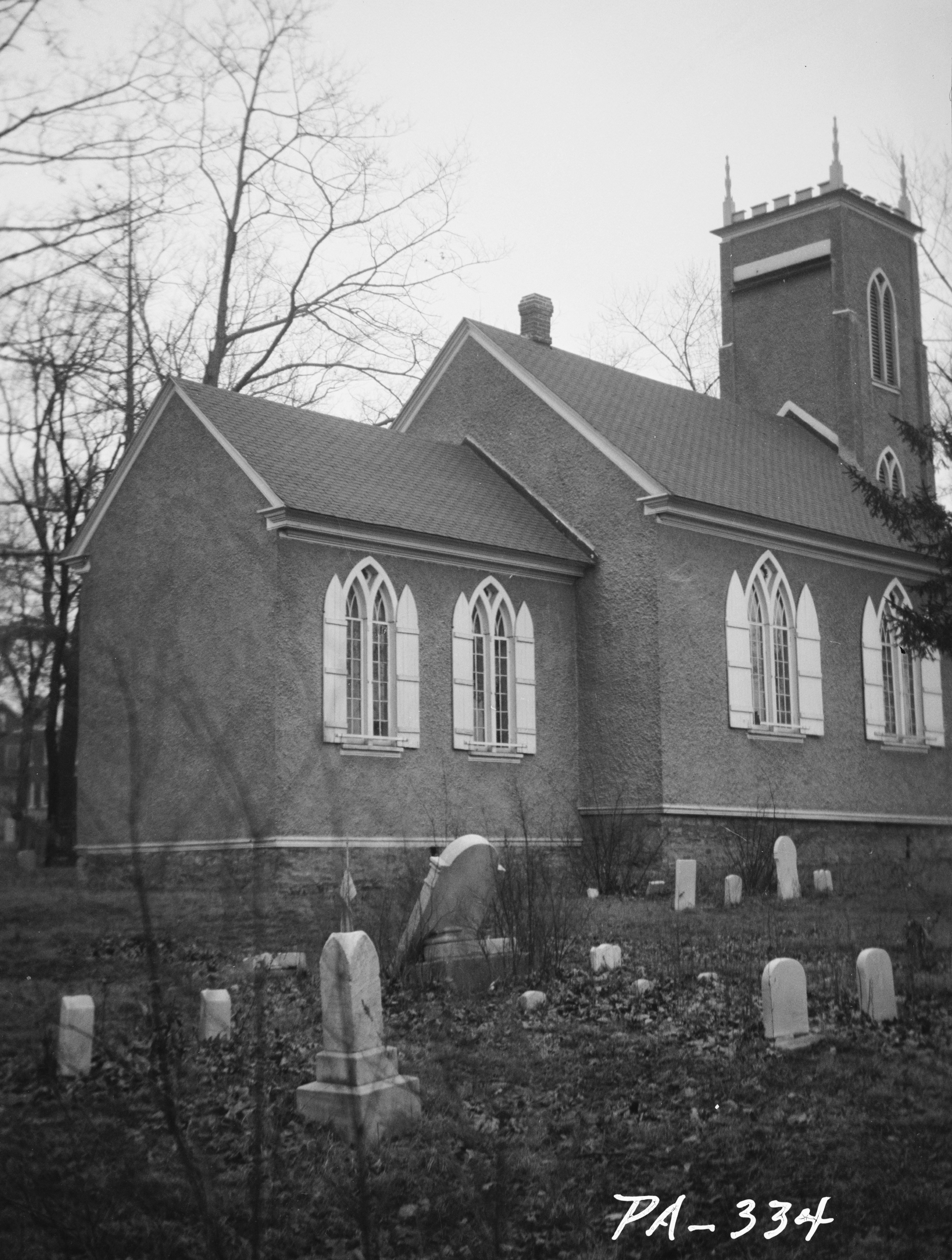
Rear of the church in a 1935 photo from the Historic American Buildings Survey
