= Lanse, Pennsylvania =

Unincorporated community in Pennsylvania, US

- Village
- Location within Pennsylvania
- Coordinates: 40°58′30″N 78°07′46″W
- Country: United States
- State: Pennsylvania
- County: Clearfield
- Elevation: 1,598 ft (487 m)
- Time zone: UTC-5 (Eastern (EST))
  - Summer (DST): UTC-4 (EDT)
- ZIP code: 16849
- Area code: 814
- GNIS feature ID: 1178880

Lanse is an unincorporated community in Clearfield County, Pennsylvania, United States. The community is located 7.3 miles (11.7 km) northeast of Philipsburg. Lanse has a post office with ZIP code 16849, which opened on October 1, 1898.

== Demographics ==
Historical population
Census	Pop.	Note	%±

The United States Census Bureau defined Lanse as a census designated place (CDP) in 2023.
