= West Decatur, Pennsylvania =

Unincorporated community in Pennsylvania, US

- Census-designated place
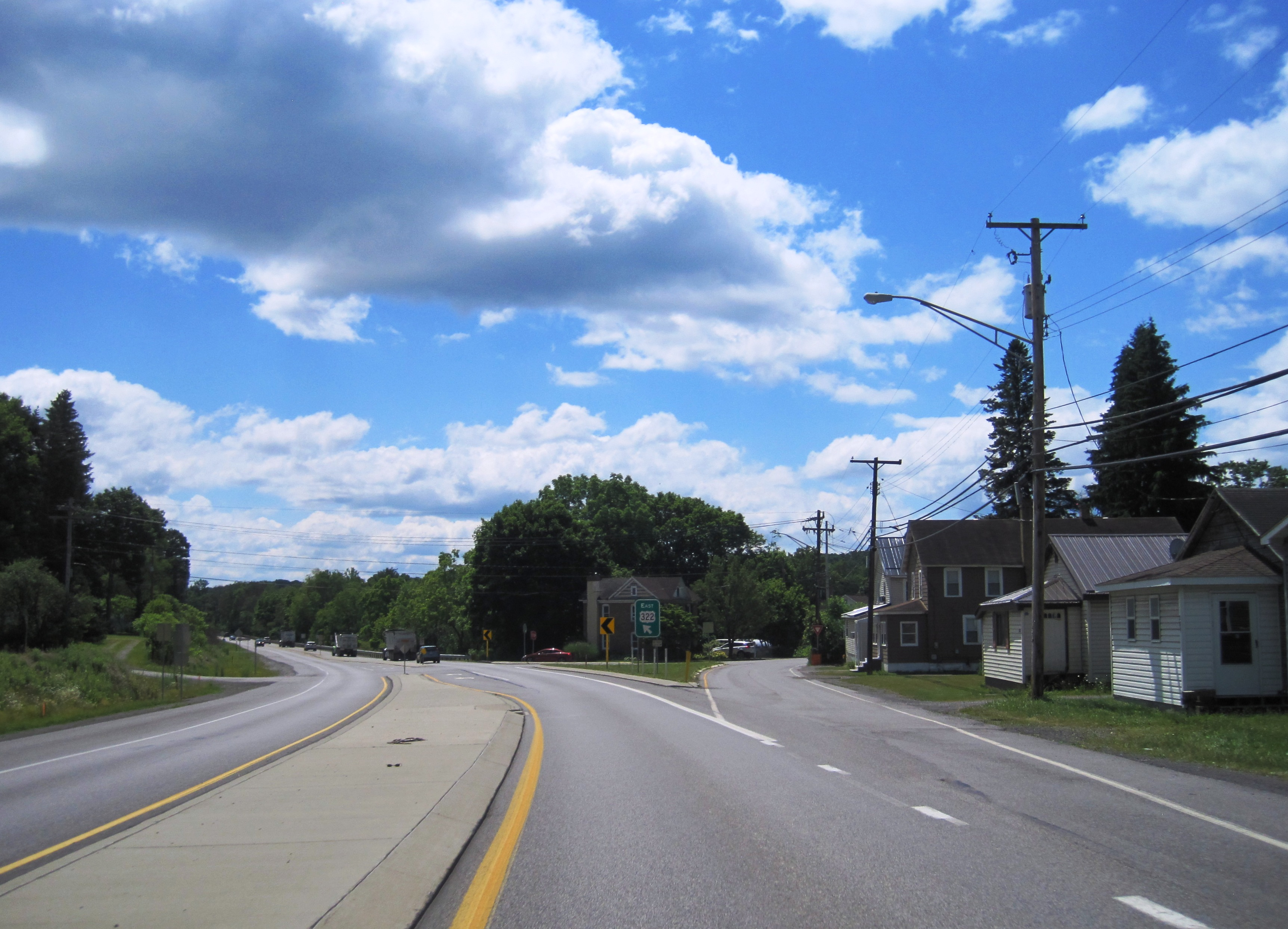
- US 322 eastbound in West Decatur

- Location in Pennsylvania West Decatur (the United States)
- Coordinates: 40°55′40″N 78°16′48″W
- Country: United States
- State: Pennsylvania
- County: Clearfield
- Township: Boggs

Area
  - Total: 1.4 sq mi (3.6 km^{2})
  - Land: 1.4 sq mi (3.6 km^{2})
  - Water: 0 sq mi (0.0 km^{2})
- Elevation: 1,550 ft (470 m)

Population (2020)
  - Total: 453
  - Density: 380/sq mi (147/km^{2})
- Time zone: UTC-5 (Eastern (EST))
  - Summer (DST): UTC-4 (EDT)
- ZIP code: 16878
- FIPS code: 42-82792
- GNIS feature ID: 1211956

West Decatur is an unincorporated community and census-designated place in Clearfield County, Pennsylvania, United States. As of the 2020 census the population of West Decatur was 453.

It lies in the southeast corner of Boggs Township along Blue Ball Road just south of U.S. Route 322 between Wallaceton and Philipsburg. It was also known as Blue Ball, for the nearby blue ball clay deposits, but the local post office received the name West Decatur.

West Decatur lies along the old Philipsburg and Susquehanna Turnpike, which was part of a through route between Philadelphia and Erie, and is thus now called Old Erie Pike. The community was also on the Clearfield Branch of the Pennsylvania Railroad, opened by the Tyrone and Clearfield Railway in mid-1868 from Philipsburg to Blue Ball, and extended to Clearfield in 1869. Successor Conrail sold it to R.J. Corman Railroad/Pennsylvania Lines in 1996, but it has since been abandoned.
