= Philipsburg-Osceola Area High School =

Philipsburg Osceola Senior High School "P-O"

Location
- 502 Philips Street; Philipsburg, Pennsylvania 16866
- 40°53′31″N 78°12′34″W

Information
- Type: Public
- Motto: Learning for tomorrow...today
- Principal: Linda Hockey
- Grades: 9-12
  - Grade 9: 156
  - Grade 10: 120
  - Grade 11: 136
  - Grade 12: 108
- Campus type: Rural
- Colors: Navy and white
- Mascot: Mounties (Mountaineers)
- Assistant principal: David Simcox
- Website: Official website

Philipsburg Osceola Senior High School is a public high school located in the borough of Philipsburg, Pennsylvania, USA. The school serves students from most of western Centre County, as well as Decatur and Boggs Townships in Clearfield County. The school's mascot is the mounties or mountaineers. The school is part of the Philipsburg-Osceola Area School District. It was built in 1955.

== Notable alumni ==
- Jon Condo, NFL player - long snapper
- Matt Adams, MLB player - first baseman

== Athletics ==
Students can participate in the following sports:

- American football
- Basketball (boys and girls)
- Cheerleading
- Soccer (boys and girls)
- Track and field
- Baseball
- Softball
- Wrestling
- Volleyball
- Golf (boys and girls)
