= Chester Hill, Pennsylvania =

Borough in Pennsylvania, US

- Borough
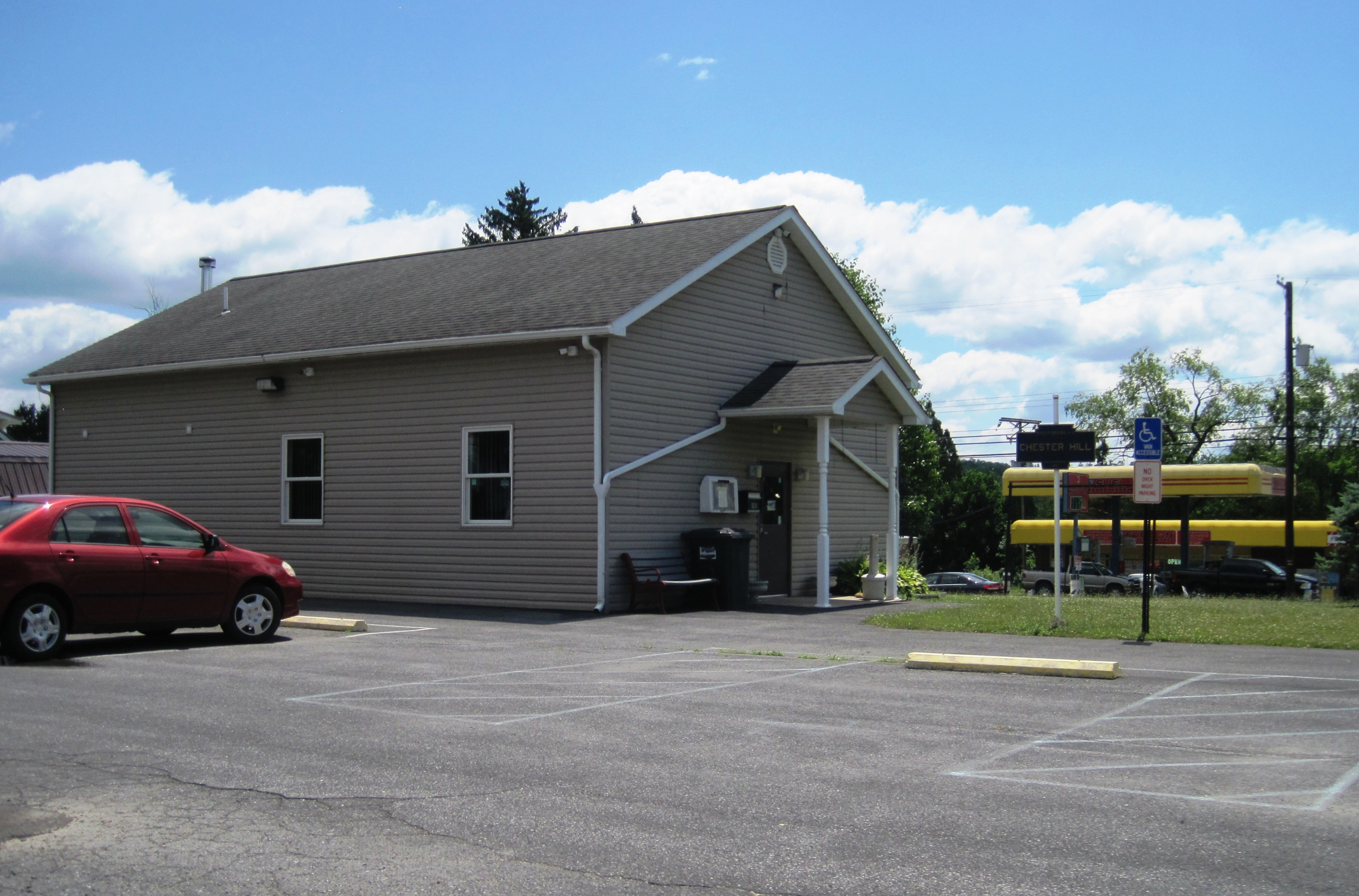
- Borough hall and keystone marker

- Location of Chester Hill in Clearfield County, Pennsylvania.

- Map showing Clearfield County in Pennsylvania

- Pennsylvania
- Coordinates: 40°53′30″N 78°13′44″W
- Country: United States
- State: Pennsylvania
- County: Clearfield
- Settled: 1849
- Incorporated: 1883

Government
  - Type: Borough Council

Area
  - Total: 0.48 sq mi (1.24 km^{2})
  - Land: 0.44 sq mi (1.15 km^{2})
  - Water: 0.035 sq mi (0.09 km^{2})
- Elevation: 1,450 ft (440 m)

Population (2020)
  - Total: 821
  - Density: 1,854.9/sq mi (716.17/km^{2})
- Time zone: UTC-5 (Eastern (EST))
  - Summer (DST): UTC-4 (EDT)
- ZIP code: 16866
- Area code: 814
- FIPS code: 42-13240

Chester Hill is a borough in Clearfield County, Pennsylvania, United States. The population was 821 at the 2020 census.

== Geography ==
Chester Hill is located in eastern Clearfield County at 40°53′30″N 78°13′44″W (40.891595, -78.228778), on the west side of Moshannon Creek, across from the borough of Philipsburg in Centre County. Pennsylvania Route 53 passes through the borough, leading northeast into Philipsburg and southwest 3.7 miles (6.0 km) to Osceola Mills.

According to the United States Census Bureau, Chester Hill has a total area of 0.47 square miles (1.23 km^{2}), of which 0.44 square miles (1.14 km^{2}) is land and 0.03 square miles (0.09 km^{2}), or 7.30%, is water.

== Demographics ==
Historical population
Census	Pop.	Note	%±
1890	563		—
1900	710		26.1%
1910	648		−8.7%
1920	823		27.0%
1930	786		−4.5%
1940	885		12.6%
1950	954		7.8%
1960	919		−3.7%
1970	868		−5.5%
1980	1,054		21.4%
1990	945		−10.3%
2000	918		−2.9%
2010	883		−3.8%
2020	821		−7.0%
2021 (est.)	808	▼	−1.6%

As of the census of 2010, there were 883 people, 382 households, and 250 families residing in the borough. The population density was 1,782.0 inhabitants per square mile (688.0/km^{2}). There were 410 housing units at an average density of 827.4 per square mile (319.5/km^{2}). The racial makeup of the borough was 96.9% White, 0.6% Black or African American, 0.9% Asian, 0.2% other, and 1.4% from two or more races. Hispanic or Latino of any race were 0.6% of the population.

There were 382 households, out of which 33.8% had children under the age of 18 living with them, 41.4% were married couples living together, 4.2% had a male householder with no wife present, 19.9% had a female householder with no husband present, and 34.5% were non-families. 30.1% of all households were made up of individuals, and 12.1% had someone living alone who was 65 years of age or older. The average household size was 2.31 and the average family size was 2.80.

In the borough, the population was spread out, with 26.6% under the age of 18, 8.6% from 18 to 24, 25.3% from 25 to 44, 24.1% from 45 to 64, and 15.4% who were 65 years of age or older. The median age was 36 years. For every 100 females, there were 93.2 males. For every 100 females age 18 and over, there were 84.1 males.

The median income for a household in the borough was $26,500, and the median income for a family was $49,375. The per capita income for the borough was $17,320. About 23.9% of families and 33.0% of the population were below the poverty line, including 52.9% of those under age 18 and 13.0% of those age 65 or over.
