= Munson, Pennsylvania =

Unincorporated community in Pennsylvania, US

- Unincorporated community
- Location within Pennsylvania
- Coordinates: 40°57′17″N 78°10′23″W
- Country: United States
- State: Pennsylvania
- County: Clearfield
- Elevation: 1,434 ft (437 m)
- Time zone: UTC-5 (Eastern (EST))
  - Summer (DST): UTC-4 (EDT)
- ZIP code: 16860
- Area code: 814
- GNIS feature ID: 1182098

Munson is an unincorporated community in Clearfield County, Pennsylvania, United States. The community is located along Moshannon Creek, 4.8 miles (7.7 km) north-northeast of Philipsburg. Munson had a post office until September 28, 2002; it still has its own ZIP code, 16860.
