= Rowland Theater =

- U.S. National Register of Historic Places
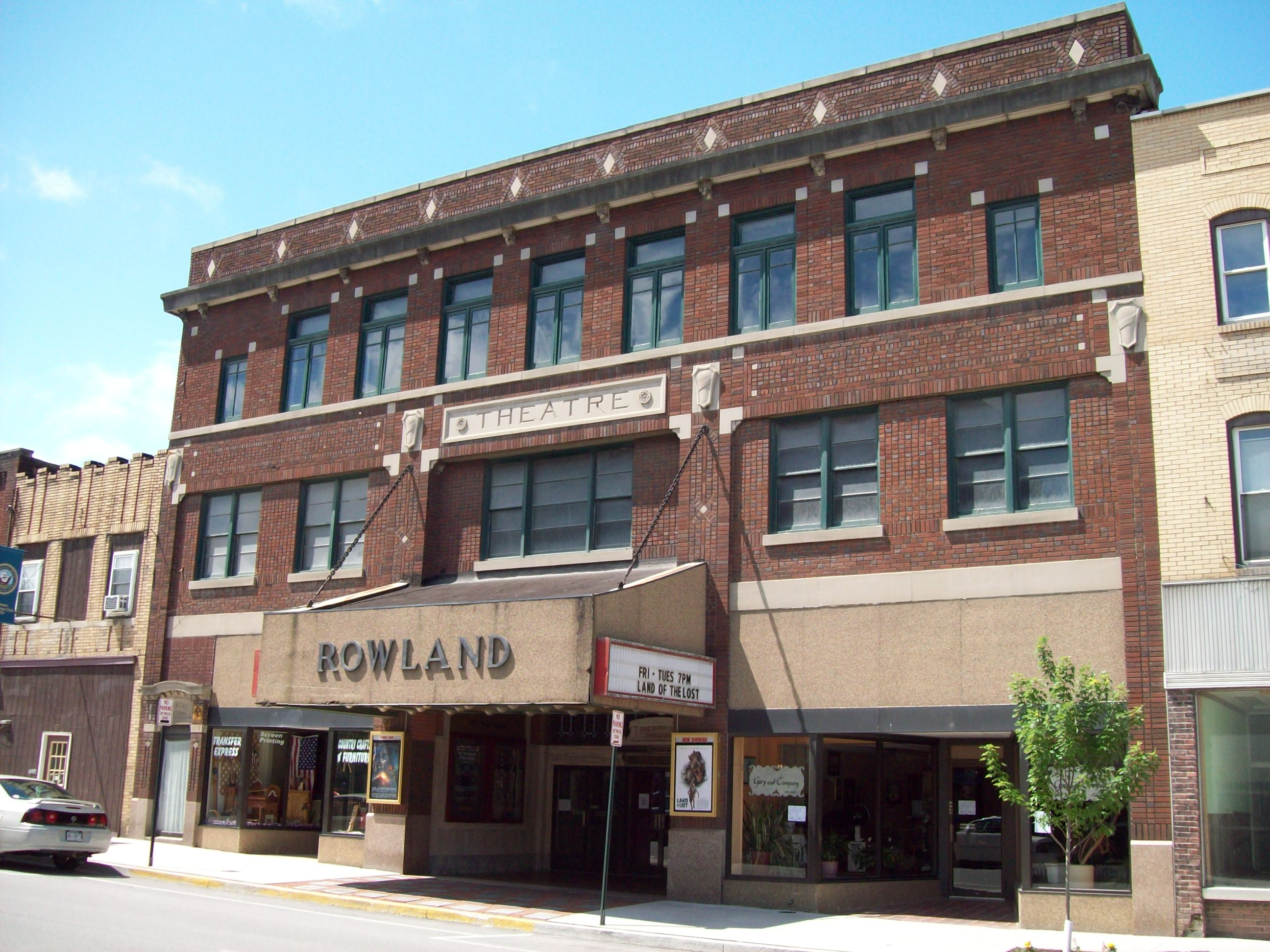
- Rowland Theater, June 2009

- Location within Pennsylvania Location within the United States
- Location: Front St., Philipsburg, Pennsylvania
- Coordinates: 40°53′47″N 78°13′25″W
- Built: 1917
- Architect: Julian Millard, W.A. Hoyt
- NRHP reference No.: 79002186
- Added to NRHP: October 18, 1979

The Rowland Theater (alternately spelled Theatre), located at 127 North Front Street, Philipsburg, Centre County, Pennsylvania, United States, is an historic single screen movie theater, built in 1916 by Charles Hedding Rowland. The theater is owned by the borough of Phillipsburg.

== History ==
The site of the Rowland Theatre building was previously occupied by the Pierce Opera House. Owned by Philipsburg businessman J.H. Pierce and built sometime before 1889, this three-story building was destroyed by fire, along with several other downtown buildings, on December 30, 1910. Then the Rowland family purchased the Opera House property on December 31, 1915, and immediately began making plans for the construction of a building that could house live theatrical performances as well as conventions and public meetings. The theatre is currently owned by Philipsburg Borough and leased to Rowland Theatre, Inc. a 501(c)3 non-profit. It was added to the National Register of Historic Places in 1979. It is located in the Philipsburg Historic District.

=== Charles Hedding Rowland ===
U.S. Congressman Charles Hedding Rowland, born December 20, 1860, was one of several enterprising businessmen who engaged in coal mining operations in the Philipsburg Area. He was president of both the Moshannon Coal Mining Company and the Pittsburg and Susquehanna Railroad Companies during the late 19th century. He was later elected as a representative of the Republican Party to the 64th and 65th Congress. His terms of office as a U.S. Congressman began in March, 1915, and ended in March, 1919. He declined a re-nomination in 1918, serving out his remaining term before retiring.

=== Construction ===
Construction then was carried out under the direction of architect Julian Millard, designer, with W. A. Hoyt, serving as the construction engineer. Planning began in 1915, with construction starting in 1916, and completed in mid 1917

After completion of the construction of the theater, Rowland released this statement in a brochure distributed to the public on opening night in June, 1917:

“The people of Philipsburg have long indulged the hope of a comfortable and commodious place of amusement and entertainment. For years we have had no suitable place for public meetings, entertaining conventions, or any auditorium large enough for the varied necessities of a community as large as ours. Such a building is a public necessity. The town needs it in order to keep pace with out [sic?] sister communities. Community growth would be retarded without such a public convenience.

The theatre's founder stated that the building was intended to provide Philipsburg with a modern, safe, and well-equipped venue while retaining elements of traditional theatre design. He said the venue would present plays and motion pictures and serve audiences from Philipsburg and surrounding communities.

== Architecture ==
The building itself is a brick and ferro-concrete structure measuring sixty-six by two-hundred-twenty-two feet in plan. The first story of the front part of the building contains the theatre's entrance way, outer lobby, and two commercial stores. A suite of offices is found on the second floor and a meeting/rehearsal hall and miscellaneous rooms are on the third floor. The second and third floors are not currently used, as they do not comply with modern fire codes in providing adequate fire exits.

=== Façade ===
As a whole, the façade is a symmetrical composition with classically inspired detailing. Despite the volumetric effects of the projecting marquee, recessed theatre and shop entrances, and bracketed cornice, the image is predominantly two-dimensional. However, the use of decorative patterns in the brickwork, contrasting color and texture of materials, and architecture ornamentation contribute to a masterful composition. Horizontal emphasis is provided by simple, bold lintels about the store fronts, a belt course at the base of the third story windows, a projecting cornice, and caps which line the top of the parapet wall. Vertical emphasis is given by the effect of pilasters defining the three bays of the first and second stories. A rectangular concrete plaque inscribed with the word “THEATRE” and the marquee/theatre entrance defines a central axis.

=== Lobby and foyer ===
The outer lobby of the Rowland theater features plate marble on the lower half of the walls, and murals depicting both Native American and local historical scenes on the upper halves. Lighting is provided by two large hanging fixtures.

The inner foyer is large, expansive, and lavishly decorated. It features a stained glass skylight, crimson red carpet, marble plate lower walls and ornate cloth hangings on the upper walls. Two staircases, one on each side wall, lead upstairs, converging at the entrances of the main office and board room, and ending in a ramp up to the balcony. The restrooms are also located here, as well as storage for some concession supplies.

=== Main hall ===
The main hall of the Rowland theater houses the majority of seating available. Approximately 400 seats, as well as handicap-accessible areas, adorn the main floor up to the edge of the orchestra pit. The ceiling is vaulted where it meets with the steel support structure (a successful attempt to blend form and function, adding to the appealing look of the building), and once contained various ornate murals, which have since been mostly covered by white paint during restoration. Some original parts of the mural, as well as examples of restoration efforts conducted in 1930, have been left exposed.

The frame of the stage is ornately decorated, and once featured similar murals to the ceiling (some examples are left exposed here as well). Still visible are original, hand-carved wood accents over the doors leading up to the stage's side areas.

=== Balcony ===
Only 18 and older allowed in the balcony due to insurance policy.

=== Stage and screen ===
The stage in the theater is fifty feet in width, thirty-four feet deep, and has approximately 50 feet of vertical space, with eleven dressing rooms in the basement below. The front curtains are motor driven, and three additional layers of curtains run to the back wall of the stage, giving it multiple depth options for stage productions.

The screen is the largest movie screen in central Pennsylvania, measuring 29 feet wide and 15 feet tall. It can be converted to handle both Flat and Scope aspect films. It is suspended from the stage ceiling, and can be raised and lowered via a pulley system located offstage to allow for quick transition between motion picture and stage events.

=== Projection and sound systems ===
The Rowland Theater updated its projection system to digital in October 2013. The projector itself supports both Flat and Scope aspect films.

Sound is provided by a Dolby Processor. Speakers are located on stage behind the screen (center, left and right channels), in the Orchestra Pit (subwoofer), and along the sides of the theater walls (surround channels) on both the ground floor and balcony.

== Operation ==
The Rowland Theater is currently owned by Philipsburg Borough and run by the non-profit Rowland Theater, Inc. Its governing body consists of a volunteer Board of Directors. Concessions and other jobs are staffed by volunteers from the local community, and volunteer hours can be used as credit towards a variety of local programs which have community service requirements.

=== Seating ===
The theater's seating was replaced with new seats to better match the original seats. The theatre can seat approx. 400 on the main floor and 200 in the lower balcony and 270 in the upper balcony. This is due to the seats in the back portion of the balcony being originals, and therefore off-limits to the general public. They can be opened when needed, but this hasn't happened during modern operation.

=== Ticket prices ===
Prices for movies shown at the Rowland remain among the lowest in the United States. Ticket prices are as follows:

- $7 - Adult 12+
- $6 - Children 4–11, Seniors 55+
- Free - Children 3 and younger

=== Stage productions ===
The theater's stage can be used for a variety of events, including plays, choirs, and smaller orchestras. In front of the stage is an orchestra pit which can hold approximately 30 musicians and instruments. Minimal on-stage lighting and several spotlights, located throughout the theater's main hall, are available. A house sound system, separate from the system used for motion pictures, is also available.
