= Hardman Philips House =

Historic house in Pennsylvania, United States

- U.S. National Register of Historic Places
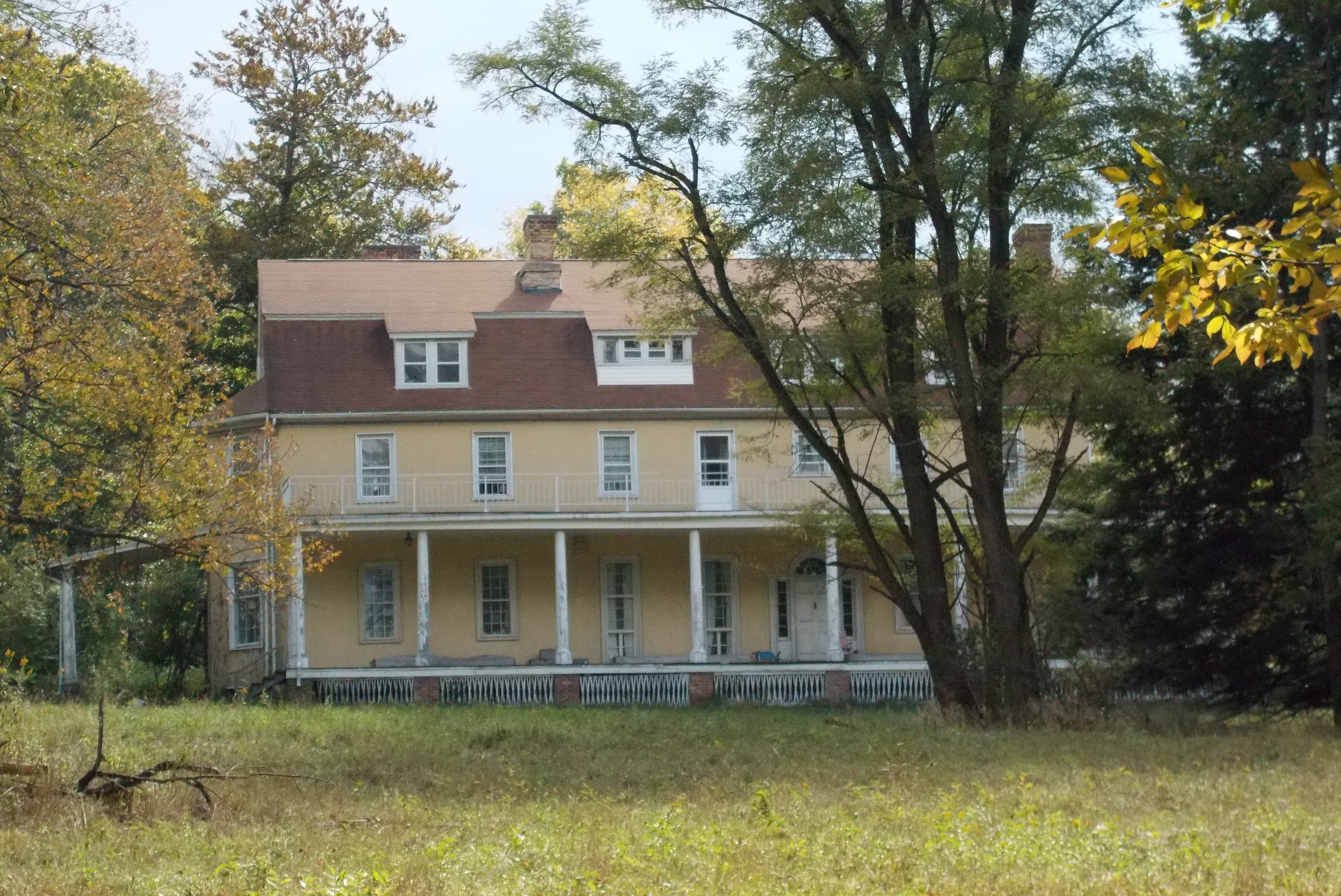
- Hardman Philips House, September 2012

- Location within Pennsylvania Location within the United States
- Location: Presquisle and 4th Sts., Philipsburg, Pennsylvania
- Coordinates: 40°53′42″N 78°12′58″W
- Area: 0.8 acres (0.32 ha)
- Built: 1813, 1820, c. 1884
- Architectural style: Georgian
- NRHP reference No.: 78002364
- Added to NRHP: September 18, 1978

The Hardman Philips House, also known as Moshannon Hall and Halehurst, is an historic home which is located in Philipsburg, Centre County, Pennsylvania.

It was added to the National Register of Historic Places in 1978.

== History and architectural features ==
This house was originally built as a 2 1/2-story, Georgian-style building with a gable roof. The original house was built circa 1813. It was later modified to its present form as a 3 1/2-story, seven-bay long dwelling with a gambrel roof.

The exterior is coated in stucco, and a full-length front and side porch encircles the first story. Many of these modifications and additions took place circa 1884.
