= Boggs Township, Clearfield County, Pennsylvania =

Township in Pennsylvania, US

Coordinates: 40°57′32″N 78°19′36″W

- Township
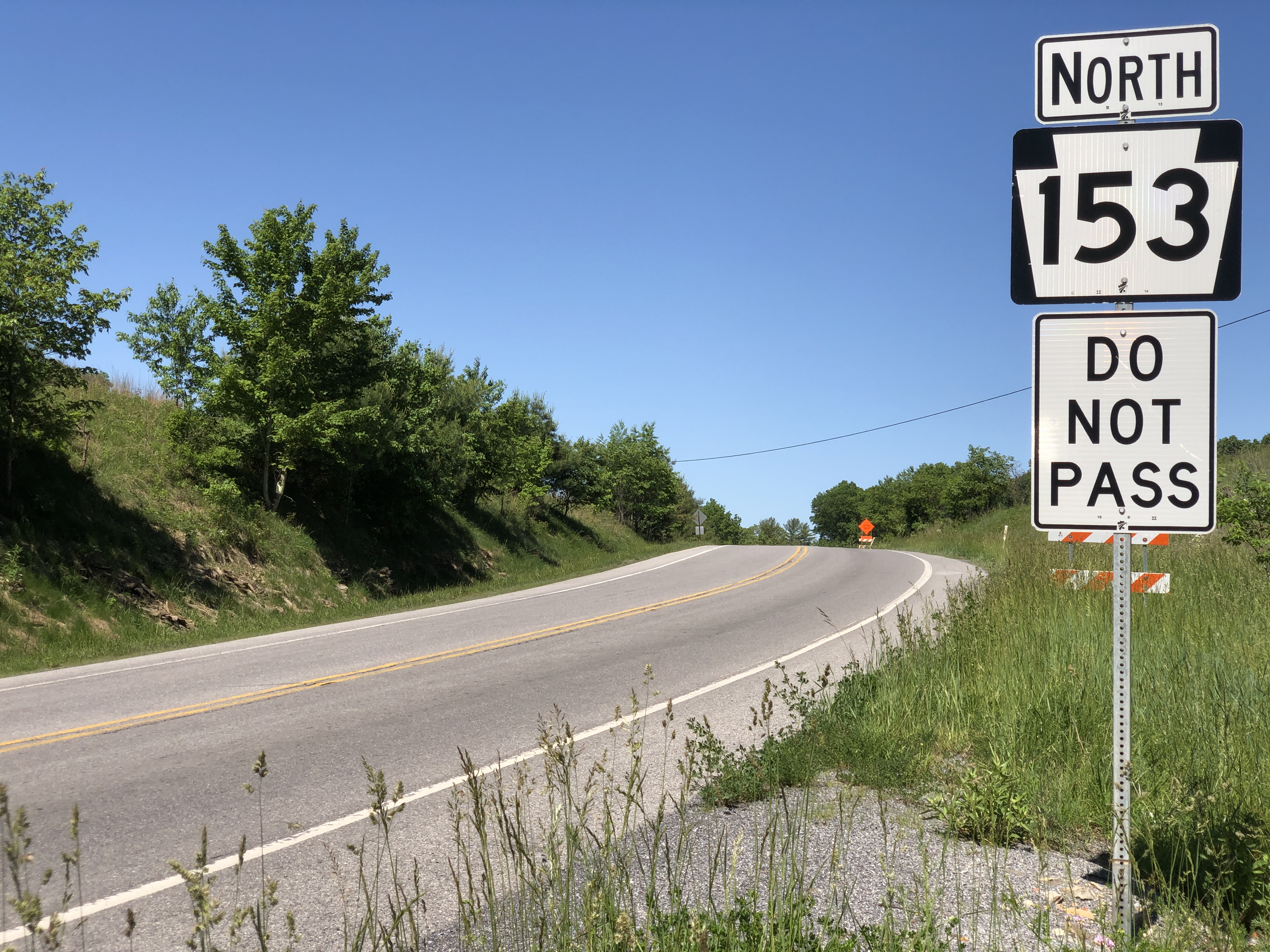
- PA 153 in Boggs Township

- Logo

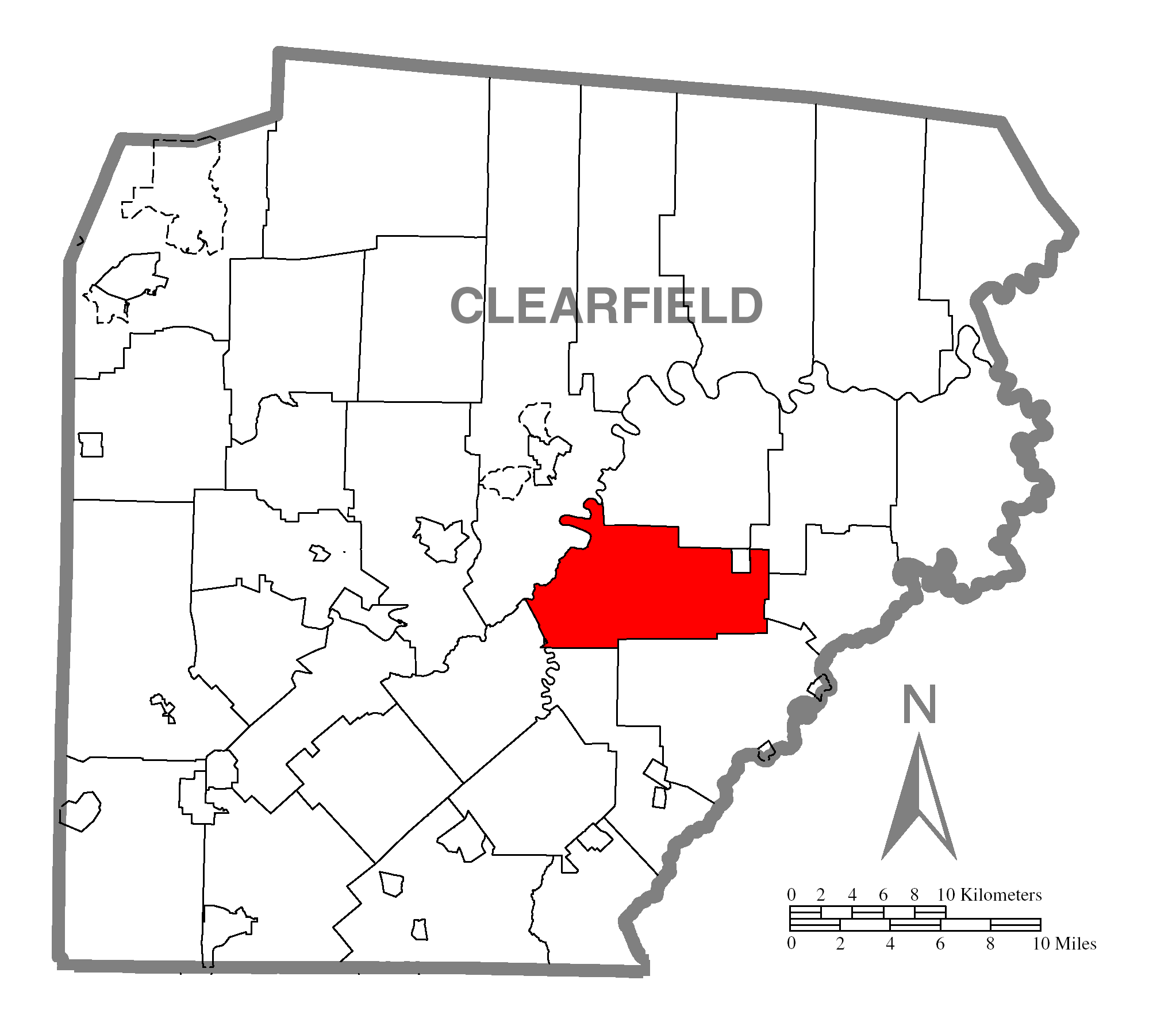
- Map of Clearfield County, Pennsylvania highlighting Boggs Township

- Map of Clearfield County, Pennsylvania
- Country: United States
- State: Pennsylvania
- County: Clearfield
- Settled: 1810
- Incorporated: 1838

Area
  - Total: 36.51 sq mi (94.57 km^{2})
  - Land: 36.19 sq mi (93.74 km^{2})
  - Water: 0.32 sq mi (0.83 km^{2})

Population (2020)
  - Total: 1,666 ▼
  - Estimate (2022): 1,641 ▼
  - Density: 47.8/sq mi (18.45/km^{2})
- Time zone: UTC-5 (Eastern (EST))
  - Summer (DST): UTC-4 (EDT)
- Area code: 814
- FIPS code: 42-033-07432
- Website: www.boggstwp.com

Boggs Township is a township in Clearfield County, Pennsylvania, United States. The population was 1,666 at the 2020 census.

== Geography ==
According to the United States Census Bureau, the township has a total area of 36.4 square miles (94 km^{2}), of which 36.3 square miles (94 km^{2}) is land and 0.1 square miles (0.26 km^{2}) (0.28%) is water.

== Communities ==
- Krebs
- Spring Valley
- West Decatur - (census-designated place)

== Demographics ==
Historical population
Census	Pop.	Note	%±
1970	1,454		—
1980	1,924		32.3%
1990	1,907		−0.9%
2000	1,837		−3.7%
2010	1,751		−4.7%
2020	1,666		−4.9%
2022 (est.)	1,641		−1.5%
U.S. Decennial Census

As of the census of 2000, there were 1,837 people, 736 households, and 549 families residing in the township. The population density was 50.7 inhabitants per square mile (19.6/km^{2}). There were 791 housing units at an average density of 21.8/sq mi (8.4/km^{2}). The racial makeup of the township was 98.91% White, 0.05% African American, 0.22% Native American, 0.33% Asian, 0.11% from other races, and 0.38% from two or more races. Hispanic or Latino of any race were 0.11% of the population.

There were 736 households, out of which 30.6% had children under the age of 18 living with them, 64.0% were married couples living together, 6.3% had a female householder with no husband present, and 25.3% were non-families. 21.7% of all households were made up of individuals, and 11.1% had someone living alone who was 65 years of age or older. The average household size was 2.50 and the average family size was 2.89.

In the township the population was spread out, with 23.0% under the age of 18, 8.2% from 18 to 24, 30.8% from 25 to 44, 24.4% from 45 to 64, and 13.7% who were 65 years of age or older. The median age was 39 years. For every 100 females, there were 94.6 males. For every 100 females age 18 and over, there were 96.4 males.

The median income for a household in the township was $31,367, and the median income for a family was $37,273. Males had a median income of $28,924 versus $19,395 for females. The per capita income for the township was $14,694. About 7.0% of families and 10.1% of the population were below the poverty line, including 11.9% of those under age 18 and 10.3% of those age 65 or over.

== Education ==
Students in Boggs Township attend schools in the Philipsburg-Osceola Area School District.
