= Decatur Township, Clearfield County, Pennsylvania =

Township in Pennsylvania, US

Coordinates: 40°54′00″N 78°14′29″W

- Township
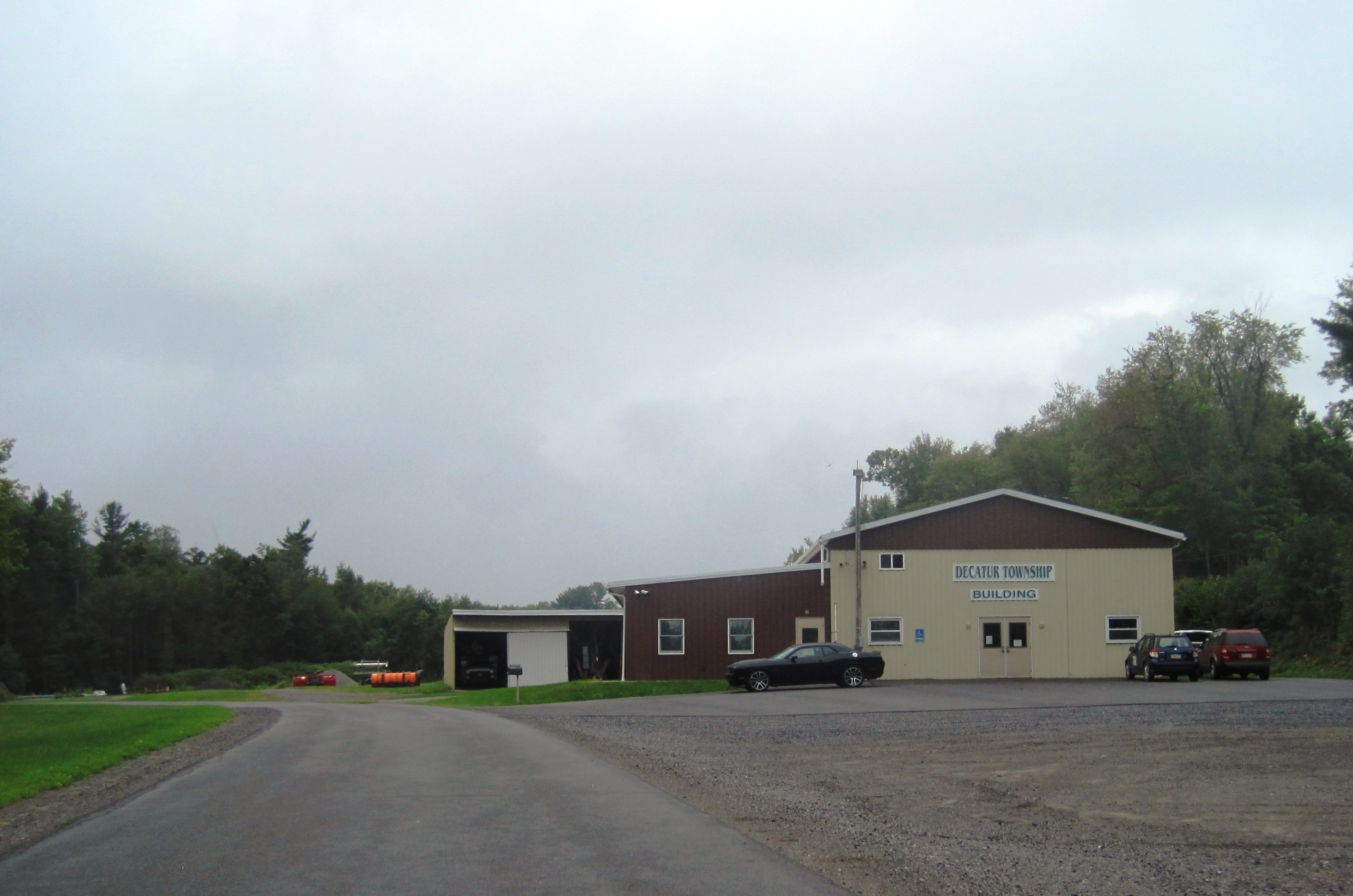
- Municipal building

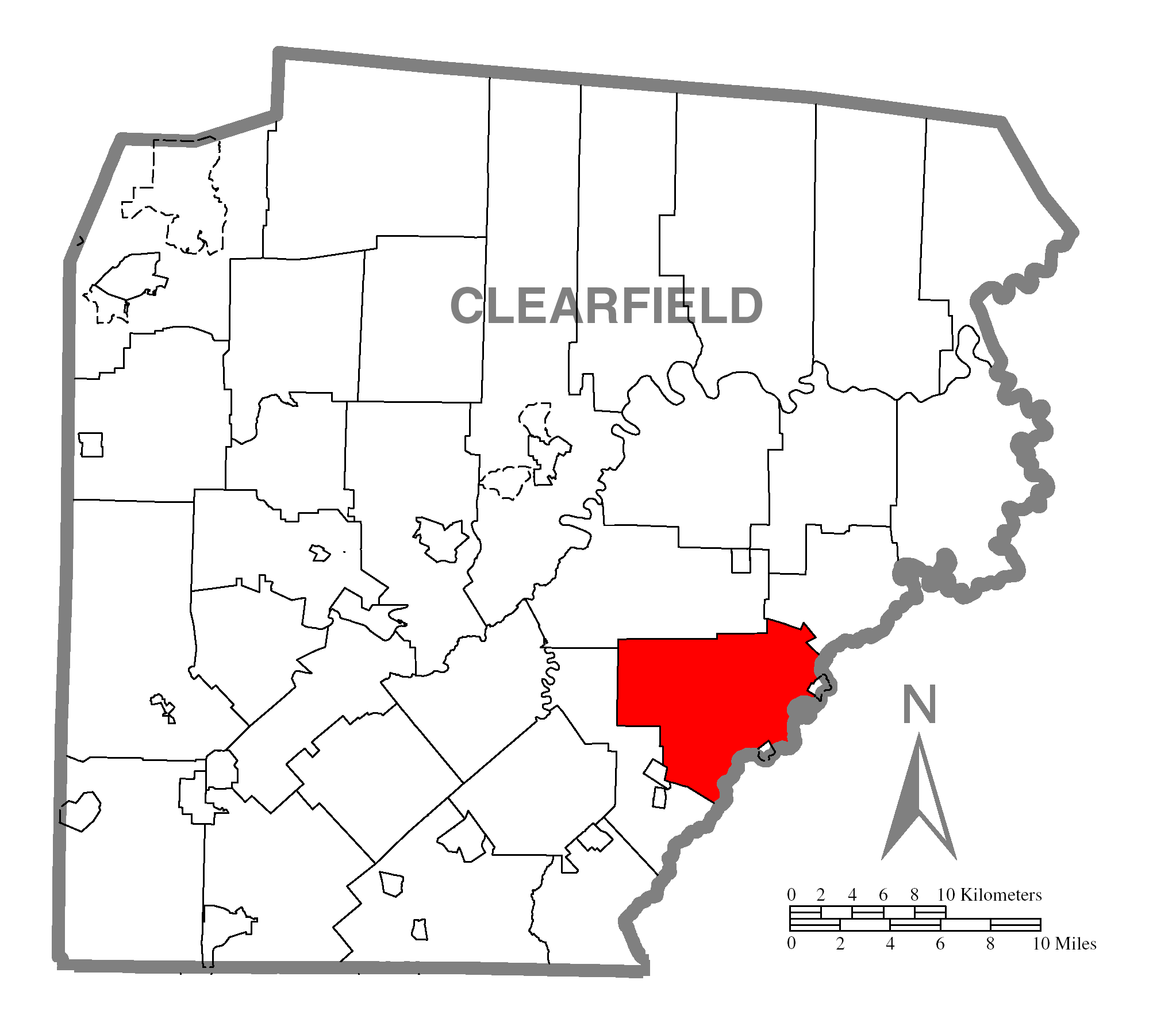
- Map of Clearfield County, Pennsylvania highlighting Decatur Township

- Map of Clearfield County, Pennsylvania
- Country: United States
- State: Pennsylvania
- County: Clearfield
- Settled: 1797
- Incorporated: 1828

Area
  - Total: 37.64 sq mi (97.49 km^{2})
  - Land: 37.39 sq mi (96.85 km^{2})
  - Water: 0.25 sq mi (0.64 km^{2})

Population (2020)
  - Total: 4,549 ▲
  - Estimate (2021): 4,540
  - Density: 127/sq mi (49.2/km^{2})
- Time zone: UTC-5 (Eastern (EST))
  - Summer (DST): UTC-4 (EDT)
- Area code: 814
- FIPS code: 42-033-18456

Decatur Township is a township in Clearfield County, Pennsylvania, United States. The population was 4,549 at the 2020 census, an increase over the figure tabulated in the 2010 census in which the population was 2,548. The township is named after war hero Stephen Decatur, Jr.

== Geography ==
According to the United States Census Bureau, the township has a total area of 38.1 square miles (99 km^{2}), all land.

== Communities ==
- Ashland
- Beaverton
- Drane
- Gearhartville
- Graham
- Hudson
- Jeffries
- Morgan Run
- Moshannon
- New Castle
- New Liberty
- Newtown
- Parsonville
- Pleasant Hill
- Scotch Hollow
- Stumptown
- Victor

=== Unincorporated community ===
New Castle (Clearfield County)

== Demographics ==
Historical population
Census	Pop.	Note	%±
1970	2,763		—
1980	3,395		22.9%
1990	3,004		−11.5%
2000	2,974		−1.0%
2010	4,548		52.9%
2020	4,549		0.0%
2021 (est.)	4,540		−0.2%
U.S. Decennial Census

As of the census of 2000, there were 2,974 people, 1,210 households, and 861 families residing in the township. The population density was 78.0 inhabitants per square mile (30.1/km^{2}). There were 1,316 housing units at an average density of 34.5 per square mile (13.3/km^{2}). The racial makeup of the township was 98.79% White, 0.13% African American, 0.10% Native American, 0.17% Asian, 0.27% from other races, and 0.54% from two or more races. Hispanic or Latino of any race were 0.64% of the population.

There were 1,210 households, out of which 28.1% had children under the age of 18 living with them, 59.7% were married couples living together, 7.5% had a female householder with no husband present, and 28.8% were non-families. 24.4% of all households were made up of individuals, and 12.8% had someone living alone who was 65 years of age or older. The average household size was 2.46 and the average family size was 2.90.

In the township the population was spread out, with 21.6% under the age of 18, 7.1% from 18 to 24, 29.3% from 25 to 44, 26.4% from 45 to 64, and 15.7% who were 65 years of age or older. The median age was 40 years. For every 100 females, there were 95.5 males. For every 100 females age 18 and over, there were 94.5 males.

The median income for a household in the township was $32,000, and the median income for a family was $35,270. Males had a median income of $26,784 versus $17,300 for females. The per capita income for the township was $17,485. About 9.8% of families and 13.7% of the population were below the poverty line, including 29.9% of those under age 18 and 8.6% of those age 65 or over.

== Education ==
Students in Decatur Township attend schools within the Philipsburg-Osceola Area School District.
