= Wallaceton, Pennsylvania =

Borough in Pennsylvania, US

- Borough
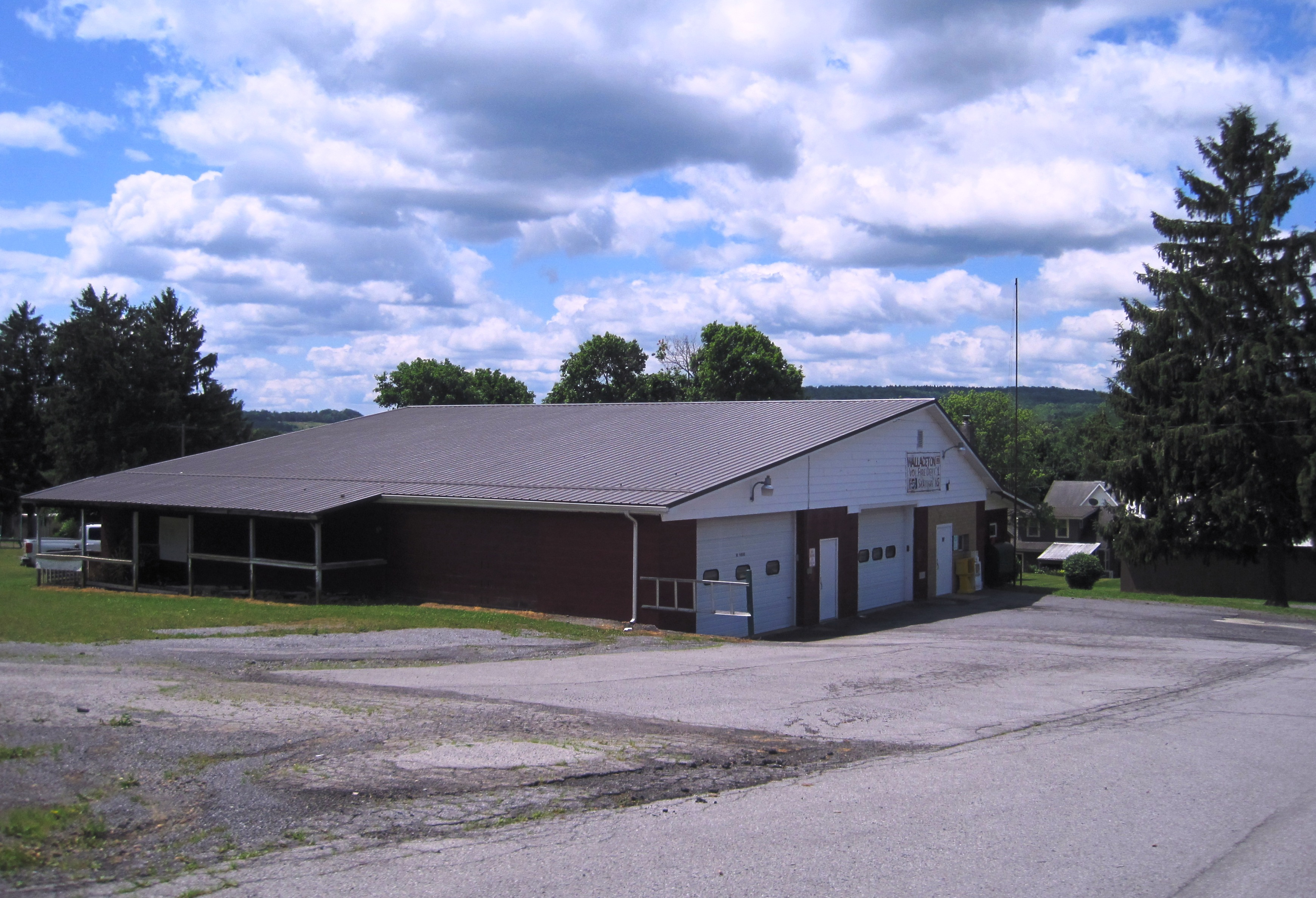
- Wallaceton Area Volunteer Fire Station and borough hall

- Location of Wallaceton in Clearfield County, Pennsylvania.

- Location of Clearfield County in Pennsylvania

- Location in Pennsylvania
- Coordinates: 40°57′36″N 78°17′20″W
- Country: United States
- State: Pennsylvania
- County: Clearfield
- Settled: 1813
- Incorporated: 1873

Government
  - Type: Borough Council

Area
  - Total: 0.76 sq mi (1.98 km^{2})
  - Land: 0.76 sq mi (1.98 km^{2})
  - Water: 0.0039 sq mi (0.01 km^{2})
- Elevation: 1,750 ft (530 m)

Population (2020)
  - Total: 297
  - Density: 388.8/sq mi (150.11/km^{2})
- Time zone: UTC-5 (Eastern (EST))
  - Summer (DST): UTC-4 (EDT)
- ZIP code: 16876
- Area code: 814
- FIPS code: 42-80640

Wallaceton is a borough in Clearfield County, Pennsylvania, United States. The population was 297 at the 2020 census.

== Geography ==
Wallaceton is located in eastern Clearfield County at 40°57′36″N 78°17′20″W (40.960106, -78.288861). U.S. Route 322 passes through the southwestern corner of the borough and leads northwest 11 miles (18 km) to Clearfield, the county seat, and southeast 6 miles (10 km) to Philipsburg.

According to the United States Census Bureau, Wallaceton has a total area of 0.77 square miles (2.0 km^{2}), all land.

== Demographics ==
Historical population
| Census | Pop. | Note | %± |
|---|---|---|---|
| 1880 | 106 | | — |
| 1890 | 250 | | 135.8% |
| 1900 | 289 | | 15.6% |
| 1910 | 324 | | 12.1% |
| 1920 | 331 | | 2.2% |
| 1930 | 345 | | 4.2% |
| 1940 | 386 | | 11.9% |
| 1950 | 440 | | 14.0% |
| 1960 | 429 | | −2.5% |
| 1970 | 377 | | −12.1% |
| 1980 | 393 | | 4.2% |
| 1990 | 319 | | −18.8% |
| 2000 | 350 | | 9.7% |
| 2010 | 313 | | −10.6% |
| 2020 | 297 | | −5.1% |
| 2021 (est.) | 297 | Steady | 0.0% |
U.S. Decennial Census

As of the census of 2000, there were 350 people, 131 households, and 96 families residing in the borough. The population density was 500.1 inhabitants per square mile (193.1/km^{2}). There were 134 housing units at an average density of 191.5 per square mile (73.9/km^{2}). The racial makeup of the borough was 98.86% White, 0.29% African American, 0.29% Native American, and 0.57% from two or more races.

There were 131 households, out of which 34.4% had children under the age of 18 living with them, 62.6% were married couples living together, 7.6% had a female householder with no husband present, and 26.0% were non-families. 22.1% of all households were made up of individuals, and 10.7% had someone living alone who was 65 years of age or older. The average household size was 2.67 and the average family size was 3.14.

In the borough the population was spread out, with 26.0% under the age of 18, 8.9% from 18 to 24, 31.4% from 25 to 44, 22.6% from 45 to 64, and 11.1% who were 65 years of age or older. The median age was 35 years. For every 100 females there were 100.0 males. For every 100 females age 18 and over, there were 96.2 males.

The median income for a household in the borough was $28,000, and the median income for a family was $38,083. Males had a median income of $28,333 versus $16,875 for females. The per capita income for the borough was $11,571. About 8.4% of families and 17.3% of the population were below the poverty line, including 29.2% of those under age 18 and 23.8% of those age 65 or over.
