= Osceola Mills, Pennsylvania =

Borough in Pennsylvania, US

- Borough
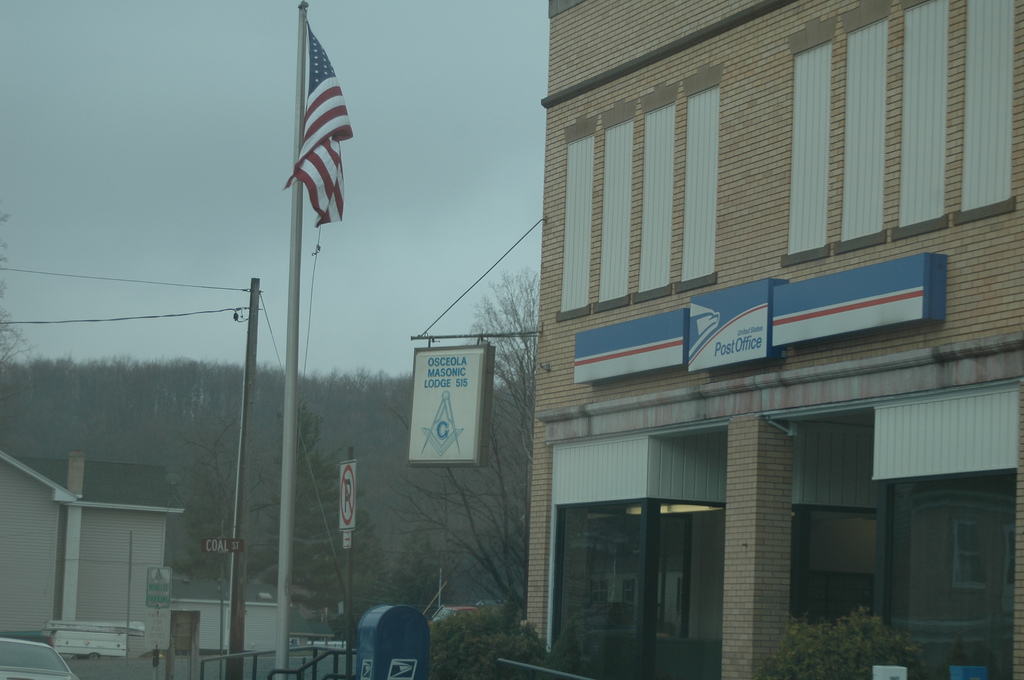
- The Masonic lodge and post office in Osceola Mills

- Location of Osceola Mills in Clearfield County, Pennsylvania.

- Location in the state of Pennsylvania
- Coordinates: 40°51′10″N 78°16′14″W
- Country: United States
- State: Pennsylvania
- County: Clearfield
- Settled: 1857
- Incorporated: 1864

Government
  - Type: Borough council

Area
  - Total: 0.33 sq mi (0.86 km^{2})
  - Land: 0.33 sq mi (0.86 km^{2})
- Elevation: 1,525 ft (465 m)

Population (2020)
  - Total: 1,045
  - Density: 3,159.6/sq mi (1,219.92/km^{2})
- Time zone: UTC-5 (EST)
  - Summer (DST): UTC-4 (EDT)
- ZIP code: 16666
- Area code: 814
- FIPS code: 42-57232

Osceola Mills is a borough in Clearfield County, Pennsylvania, United States. The population was 1,045 at the 2020 census.

== Geography ==
Osceola Mills is located along the southeastern border of Clearfield County at 40°51′10″N 78°16′14″W (40.852870, -78.270455). It is on the north side of Moshannon Creek, which forms the boundary between Clearfield and Centre counties.

Pennsylvania Route 53 passes through Osceola Mills, leading northeast 4 miles (6 km) to Philipsburg and southwest 5 miles (8 km) to Houtzdale. Pennsylvania Route 970 crosses PA 53 in the center of town and leads northwest 20 miles (32 km) to Clearfield, the county seat, and southeast 4 miles (6 km) to Sandy Ridge.

According to the United States Census Bureau, Osceola Mills has a total area of 0.33 square miles (0.85 km^{2}), all land.

== Demographics ==
Historical population
| Census | Pop. | Note | %± |
|---|---|---|---|
| 1870 | 813 | | — |
| 1880 | 1,253 | | 54.1% |
| 1890 | 1,730 | | 38.1% |
| 1900 | 2,030 | | 17.3% |
| 1910 | 2,437 | | 20.0% |
| 1920 | 2,512 | | 3.1% |
| 1930 | 2,002 | | −20.3% |
| 1940 | 2,076 | | 3.7% |
| 1950 | 1,992 | | −4.0% |
| 1960 | 1,777 | | −10.8% |
| 1970 | 1,671 | | −6.0% |
| 1980 | 1,466 | | −12.3% |
| 1990 | 1,310 | | −10.6% |
| 2000 | 1,249 | | −4.7% |
| 2010 | 1,141 | | −8.6% |
| 2020 | 1,045 | | −8.4% |
| 2021 (est.) | 1,033 | ▼ | −1.1% |

As of the 2020 US census, there were 1,045 people living on Osceola Mills living in 507 households. The population density was 3,166.7 inhabitants per square mile (1,222.7 inhabitants per square kilometre). 94.5% of the population was White alone.

== Fourth of July celebration ==
Osceola Mills is known for its annual Fourth of July Carnival, a week-long celebration sponsored by the Columbia Volunteer Fire Company. Until his retirement in 2017, the main attraction was the wheel chair pull featuring former Osceola Mills resident Jimmy Goss pulling trucks with his wheelchair. The parade and fireworks display on July 4 draws thousands of people from surrounding communities.

== Services ==
Osceola Mills maintains a recreation park with baseball fields, basketball and tennis courts, and a swimming pool. The borough is served by five churches, six bars, and a public library. The Osceola Mills Elementary School is part of the Philipsburg-Osceola Area School District. Osceola Mills is now the home of semi-pro football team the Moshannon Valley Vikings. They play at the baseball complex and are a member of the Great Eastern Football Association.
