= Philipsburg, Centre County, Pennsylvania =

Borough in Pennsylvania, US

Philipsburg, Pennsylvania
- Borough
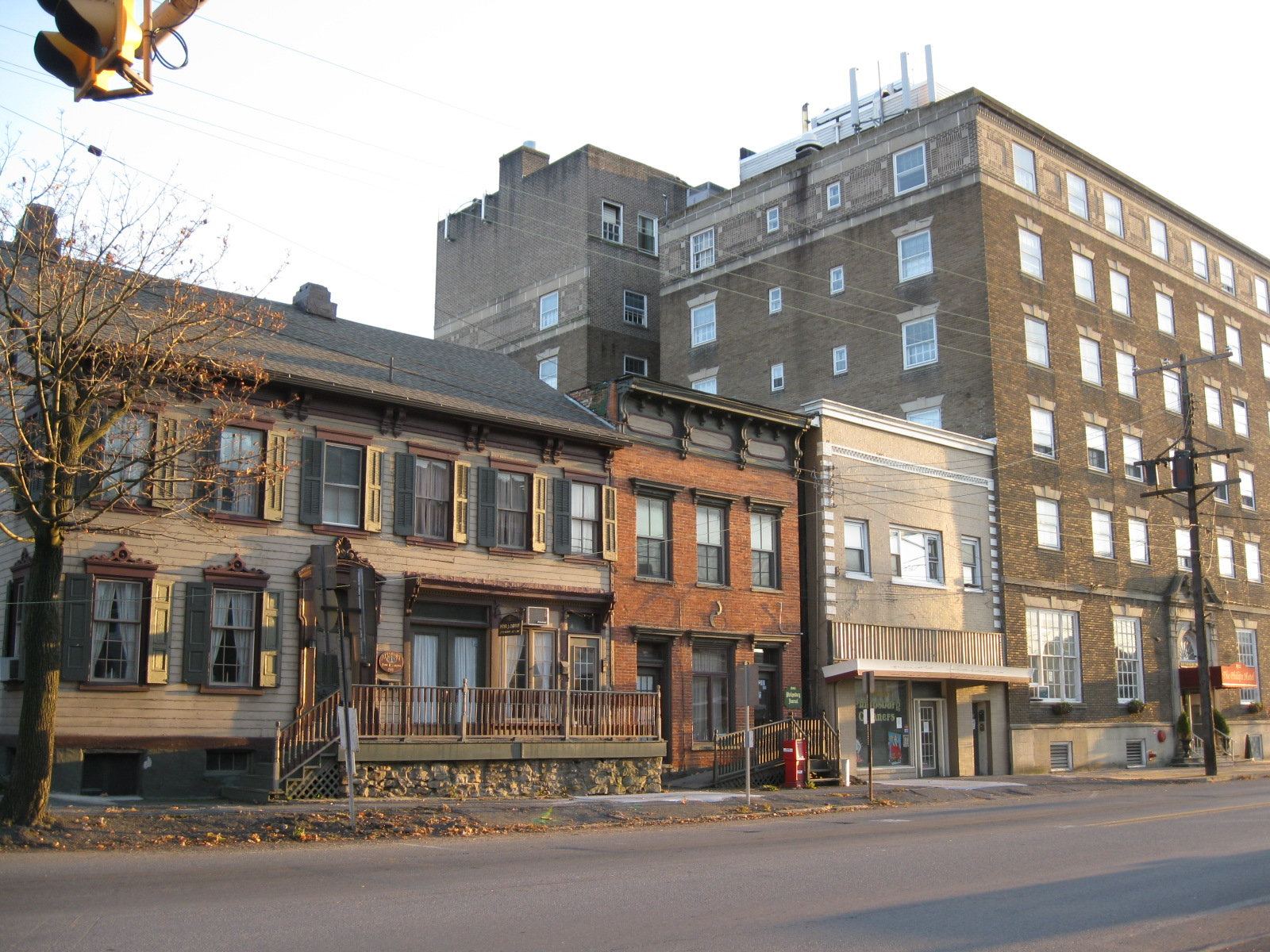
- 200 block of Presqueisle Street, Philipsburg

- Location of Philipsburg in Centre County, Pennsylvania.

- Map showing Centre County in Pennsylvania.

- Location within Pennsylvania Location within the United States
- Coordinates: 40°53′42″N 78°13′09″W
- Country: United States
- State: Pennsylvania
- County: Centre
- Settled: 1797
- Incorporated (borough): 1864

Area
  - Total: 0.88 sq mi (2.28 km^{2})
  - Land: 0.87 sq mi (2.26 km^{2})
  - Water: 0.012 sq mi (0.03 km^{2})
- Elevation: 1,437 ft (438 m)

Population (2020)
  - Total: 2,789
  - Density: 3,199.7/sq mi (1,235.43/km^{2})
- Time zone: Eastern (EST)
  - Summer (DST): EDT
- Zip Code: 16866
- Area code: 814
- FIPS code: 42-60008
- GNIS feature ID: 1215059
- Website: www.philipsburgborough.com

Philipsburg is a borough in Centre County, Pennsylvania. It is located at 40°53′42″N 78°13′09″W (40.895, -78.2193). It is part of the Moshannon Valley and State College, Pennsylvania metropolitan statistical area. The borough's population was 2,770 at the 2010 census.

== Geography ==
According to the U.S. Census Bureau, the borough has a total area of 0.8 square mile (2.1 km^{2}), all land. Major roads which pass through the area are U.S. Route 322 and PA Routes 53, 350, and 504.

== History ==
=== Indigenous Peoples ===
The first inhabitants of the Philipsburg area came towards the end of the last glacial period. They lived a nomadic hunter-gatherer lifestyle for thousands of years. The Seneca people were among the native inhabitants who began establishing settlements, farms, and trails throughout the surrounding valleys and water gaps. The Moshannon Creek, which flows along Philipsburg and makes up the border between Centre and Clearfield County, derives its name from the Seneca word Mos’hanna’unk, meaning "elk river place".

A small group of Seneca would continue to live in the area up until the Cornplanter Tract was established. The Cornplanter Tract, was the only native reservation within the state of Pennsylvania, before being destroyed by the construction of the Kinzua Dam.

=== Founding (1795-1864) ===
From 1795 to 1796 Henry Philips purchased a larger tract of land covering parts of Centre, Clearfield, and Cambria County. He offered plots of land east of the Moshannon Creek to the first twelve settlers. In 1812 the first screw mill in the United States was built in Philipsburg. The village was established as a borough on the 29th of November, 1864.

=== Flooding ===
In 1936 the Cold Stream Dam broke, flooding much of downtown Philipsburg. The borough also flooded in 2018 and 2021.

=== Historical landmarks ===
Philipsburg is home to a number of sites of renovated historical interest, including the Rowland Theater (located on Front Street), the Union Church and Burial Ground, also known as the "Mud" Church, on Presqueisle Street, the Simler House (on North Second St), and the Hardman Philips House, located off Presqueisle Street near Ninth Street, thought to be a stop on the Underground Railroad. The Rowland Mansion on South Centre Street is the former home of U.S. Congressman Charles Hedding Rowland. The Philipsburg commercial district underwent a series of renovations including a $1 million street project to revitalize the main shopping district.

The Philipsburg Historic District was added to the National Register of Historic Places in 1999.

== Demographics ==
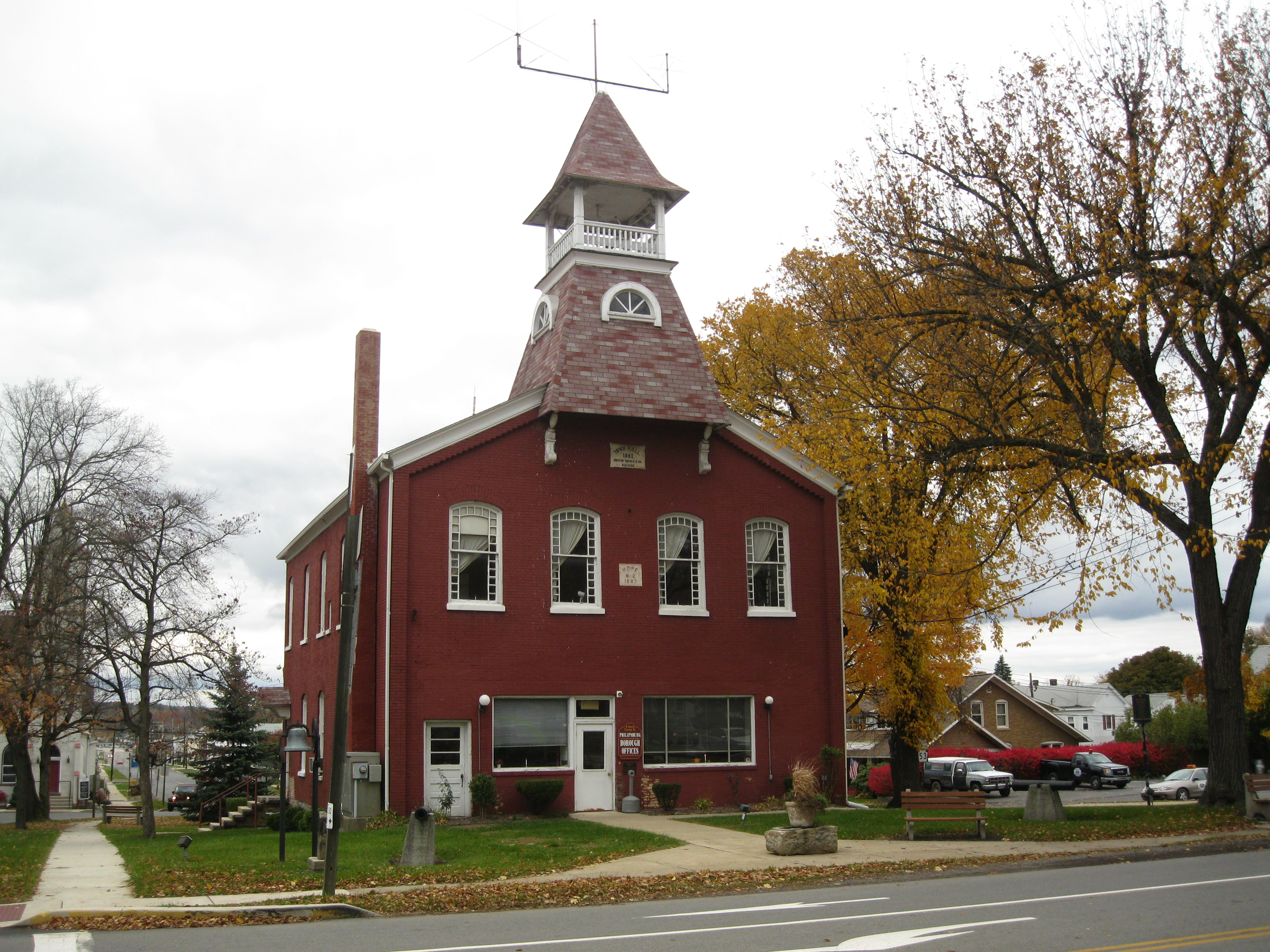
Philipsburg Borough Hall

Historical population
| Census | Pop. | Note | %± |
|---|---|---|---|
| 1870 | 1,086 | | — |
| 1880 | 1,779 | | 63.8% |
| 1890 | 3,245 | | 82.4% |
| 1900 | 3,266 | | 0.6% |
| 1910 | 3,585 | | 9.8% |
| 1920 | 3,900 | | 8.8% |
| 1930 | 3,600 | | −7.7% |
| 1940 | 3,963 | | 10.1% |
| 1950 | 3,988 | | 0.6% |
| 1960 | 3,872 | | −2.9% |
| 1970 | 3,700 | | −4.4% |
| 1980 | 3,533 | | −4.5% |
| 1990 | 3,048 | | −13.7% |
| 2000 | 3,056 | | 0.3% |
| 2010 | 2,770 | | −9.4% |
| 2020 | 2,789 | | 0.7% |
U.S. Decennial Census

As of the 2010 census, there were 2,770 people, 1,317 households, and 686 families residing in the borough. The population density was 3,462.5 inhabitants per square mile (1,336.9/km^{2}). There were 1,512 housing units at an average density of 1,890/sq mi (720/km^{2}). The racial makeup of the borough was 94.5% White,1.6% Black or African American, 0.2% Native American, 2.8% Asian, 0.3% from other races, and 1.0% from two or more races. Hispanic or Latino of any race were 1.1% of the population.

There were 1,317 households, out of which 23.2% had children under the age of 18 living with them, 38.0% were married couples living together, 3.6% had a male householder with no wife present, 10.5% had a female householder with no husband present, and 47.9% were non-families. 40.4% of all households were made up of individuals, and 18.7% had someone living alone who was 65 years of age or older. The average household size was 2.10 and the average family size was 2.86.

In the borough, the population was spread out, with 19.3% under the age of 18, 9.6% from 18 to 24, 25.8% from 25 to 44, 24.8% from 45 to 64, and 20.5% who were 65 years of age or older. The median age was 42 years. For every 100 females, there were 89.2 males. For every 100 females age 18 and over, there were 87.7 males.

The median income for a household in the borough was $31,903, and the median income for a family was $42,433. The per capita income for the borough was $23,675. 16.8% of the population and 11.0% of families were below the poverty line. Out of the total people living in poverty, 14.8% are under the age of 18 and 8.6% are 65 or older.

== Schools ==
The Philipsburg-Osceola School District is the school district that serves the Philipsburg and Osceola Mills area:

- Osceola Mills Elementary
- Philipsburg Elementary
- Philipsburg-Osceola Area Middle School
- Philipsburg-Osceola Area High School

== Notable people ==
- Matt Adams, professional baseball player - Colorado Rockies, also played for St. Louis Cardinals, Atlanta Braves, and Washington Nationals. 2019 World Series Champion with Nationals
- Tim Bainey Jr., racing driver
- Jon Condo, professional football player - Oakland Raiders
- Michael L. Hess, physician - cardiologist
- Billy Test, jazz pianist / composer-arranger, WDR Big Band
- Ty Tyson, sportscaster - Detroit Tigers
- David Wilkerson, minister, Teen Challenge
