= Pennsylvania Route 969 =

State highway in Clearfield County, Pennsylvania, US

Pennsylvania Route 969

Route information
- Maintained by PennDOT
- Length: 10.384 mi (16.711 km)

Major junctions
- West end: US 219 in Greenwood Township
- PA 729 in Lumber City
- East end: PA 453 in Curwensville

Location
- Country: United States
- State: Pennsylvania
- Counties: Clearfield

Highway system
- Pennsylvania State Route System; Interstate; US; State; Scenic; Legislative
← PA 968	→ PA 970

Pennsylvania Route 969 (PA 969) is a 10.4-mile-long (16.7 km) state highway located in Clearfield County, Pennsylvania. The western terminus is at U.S. Route 219 (US 219) in Greenwood Township. The eastern terminus is at PA 453 in Curwensville. The route is known locally as the Lumber City Highway.

== Route description ==
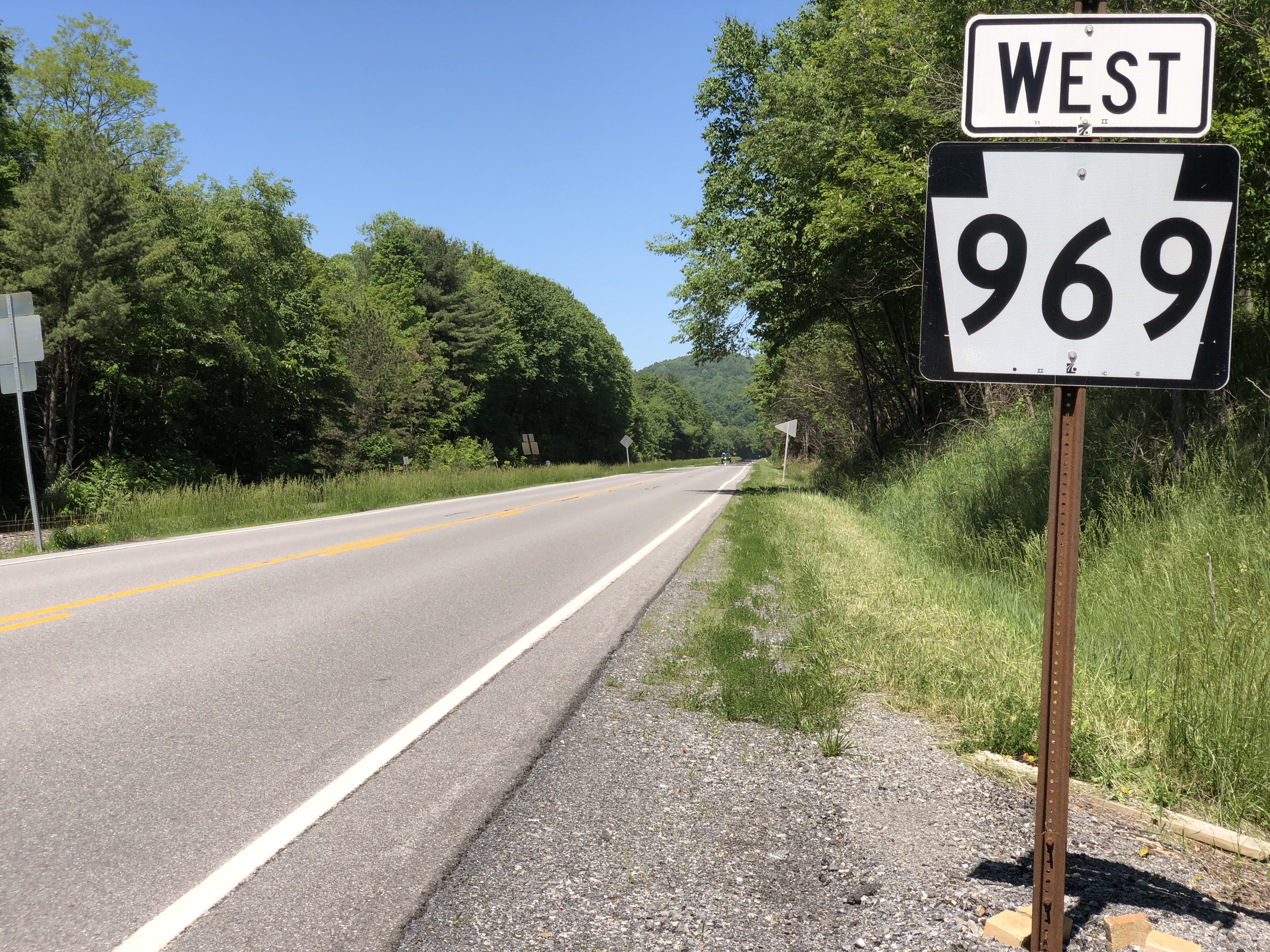
PA 969 westbound past PA 729 in Lumber City

PA 969 begins at an intersection with US 219 in the community of Bells Landing in Greenwood Township, heading east on two-lane undivided Lumber City Highway. The road winds northeast through forested areas, running a short distance to the north of a R.J. Corman Railroad line and the West Branch Susquehanna River. The route crosses into Penn Township before continuing northeast into Ferguson Township and the community of Lumber City, following the railroad line and the river east to an intersection with PA 729. Here, PA 729 turns east to form a brief concurrency with PA 969 before splitting to the south. After this, the route heads east through an area of fields before curving north into more forests. The road crosses into Pike Township and runs immediately to the west of the R.J. Corman Railroad line with Curwensville Lake a short distance to the east. The road and the railroad turn northeast and continue near more of the lake. PA 969 enters the borough of Curwensville and reaches its terminus at an intersection with PA 453.

== Major intersections ==
The entire route is in Clearfield County.

Location	mi	km	Destinations	Notes
Greenwood Township	0.000	0.000	US 219 (Mahaffey Grampian Highway) – Mahaffey, Ebensburg, DuBois	Western terminus
Ferguson Township	5.022	8.082	PA 729 north (Grandview Road) – Grampian	West end of PA 729 overlap
Ferguson Township	5.365	8.634	PA 729 south (Tyrone Pike) – Glen Hope	East end of PA 729 overlap
Curwensville	10.384	16.711	PA 453 (Susquehanna Avenue) – Curwensville, Tyrone	Eastern terminus
1.000 mi = 1.609 km; 1.000 km = 0.621 mi: Concurrency terminus
