= Lumber City, Pennsylvania =

Unincorporated community in Pennsylvania, US

- former Borough
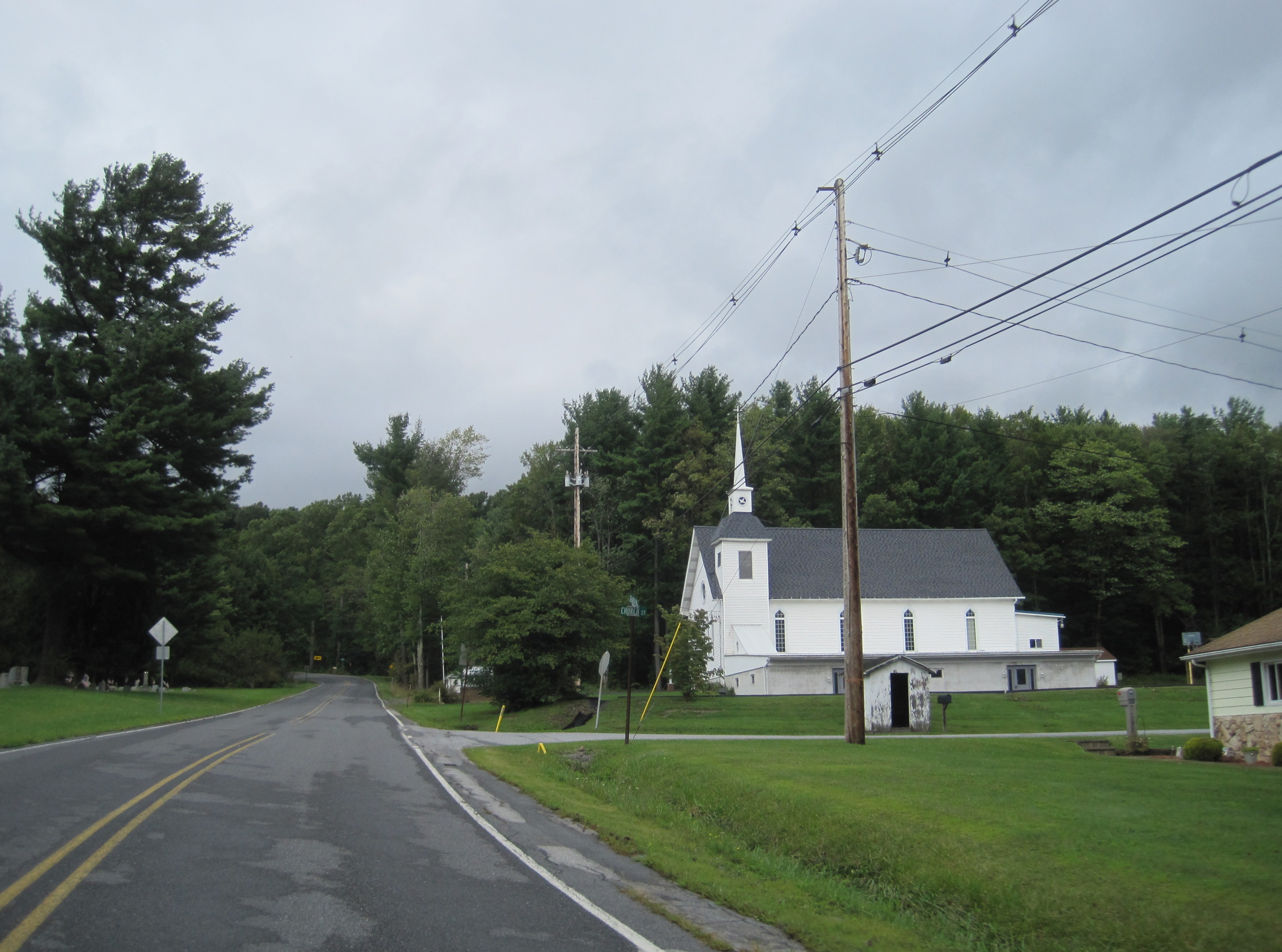
- PA 729 northbound and church in Lumber City

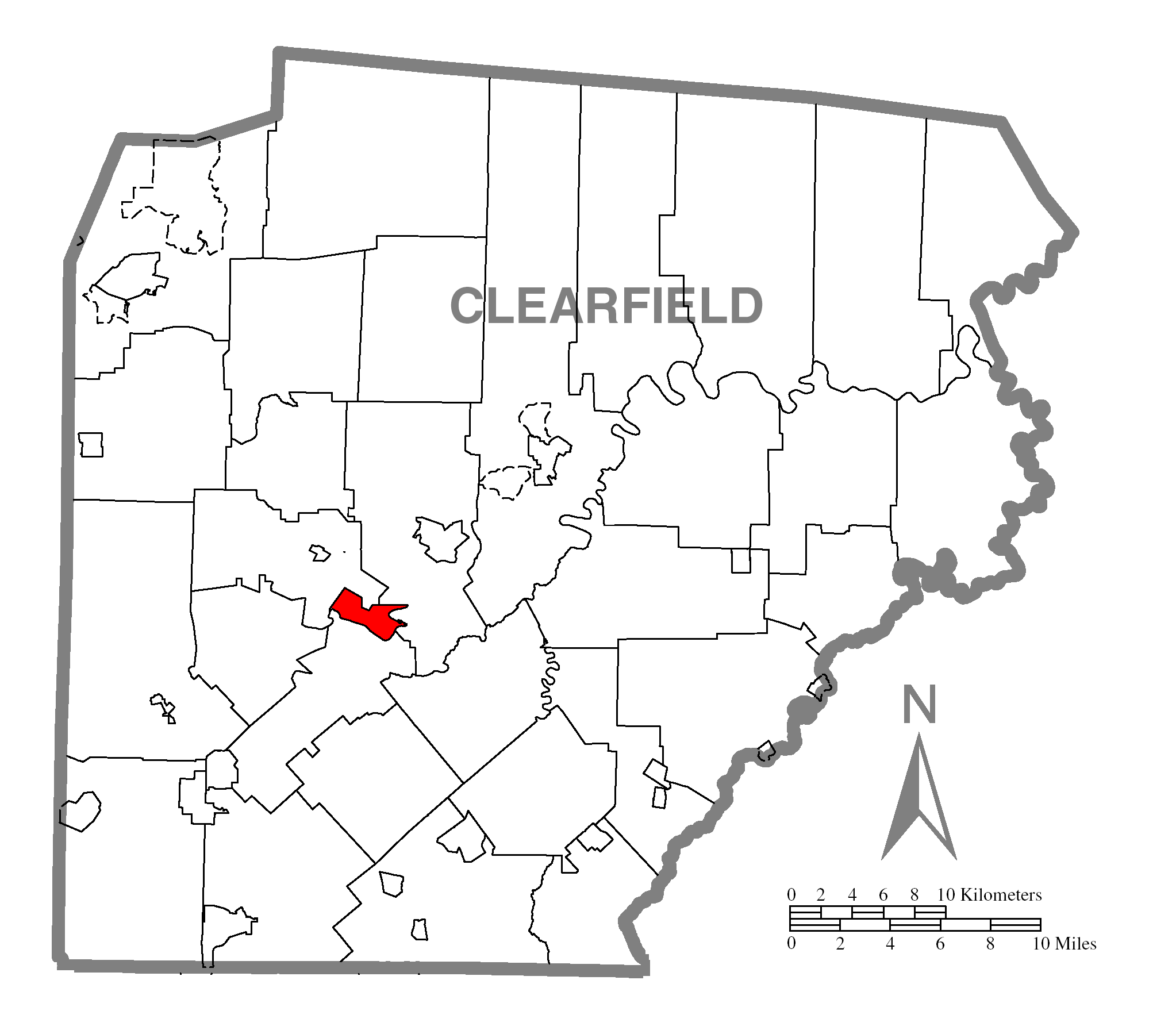
- Location of Lumber City in Clearfield County

- Location of Clearfield County in Pennsylvania

- Location in Pennsylvania
- Coordinates: 40°55′57″N 78°34′48″W
- Country: United States
- State: Pennsylvania
- County: Clearfield
- Settled: 1835
- Incorporated: 1857
- Dissolved: 2014

Government
  - Type: Borough Council

Area
  - Total: 2.9 sq mi (7.5 km^{2})
  - Land: 2.7 sq mi (7.1 km^{2})
  - Water: 0.15 sq mi (0.4 km^{2})
- Elevation: 1,220 ft (370 m)

Population (2010)
  - Total: 76
  - Density: 28/sq mi (10.7/km^{2})
- Time zone: UTC-5 (Eastern (EST))
  - Summer (DST): UTC-4 (EDT)
- Area code: 814

Lumber City is a former borough in Clearfield County, Pennsylvania, United States. The population was 76 at the 2010 census.

The borough ceased to be a separate municipality on January 6, 2014, and became part of Ferguson Township.

== Geography ==
Lumber City is located southwest of the center of Clearfield County at 40°55′57″N 78°34′48″W (40.932590, -78.580051), on the north side of the West Branch Susquehanna River. It is bordered to the north by Penn Township and to the northeast by Pike Township.

Pennsylvania Route 969 passes through the community following the West Branch, leading northeastward (downstream) 6 miles (10 km) to Curwensville and west (upstream) 5 miles (8 km) to U.S. Route 219 at Bells Landing. Pennsylvania Route 729 crosses the West Branch at Lumber City and leads north 4 miles (6 km) to US 219 at Grampian and south 12 miles (19 km) to Glen Hope.

According to the United States Census Bureau, the borough of Lumber City had a total area of 2.9 square miles (7.5 km^{2}), of which 2.7 square miles (7.1 km^{2}) was land and 0.15 square miles (0.4 km^{2}), or 5.01%, was water, prior to its merger with Ferguson Township. The upstream end of Curwensville Lake on the West Branch is at Lumber City.

== Demographics ==
Historical population
Census	Pop.	Note	%±
1860	192		—
1870	230		19.8%
1880	298		29.6%
1890	266		−10.7%
1900	224		−15.8%
1910	363		62.1%
1920	383		5.5%
1930	264		−31.1%
1940	300		13.6%
1950	262		−12.7%
1960	164		−37.4%
1970	57		−65.2%
1980	117		105.3%
1990	83		−29.1%
2000	86		3.6%
2010	76		−11.6%
2015 (est.)	75	▼	−1.3%

As of the census of 2000, there were 86 people, 34 households, and 28 families residing in the borough. The population density was 31.6 inhabitants per square mile (12.2/km^{2}). There were 40 housing units at an average density of 14.7 per square mile (5.7/km^{2}). The racial makeup of the borough was 95.35% White, and 4.65% from two or more races. Hispanic or Latino of any race were 1.16% of the population.

There were 34 households, out of which 35.3% had children under the age of 18 living with them, 70.6% were married couples living together, 5.9% had a female householder with no husband present, and 17.6% were non-families. 14.7% of all households were made up of individuals, and 5.9% had someone living alone who was 65 years of age or older. The average household size was 2.53 and the average family size was 2.79.

In the borough the population was spread out, with 24.4% under the age of 18, 2.3% from 18 to 24, 31.4% from 25 to 44, 33.7% from 45 to 64, and 8.1% who were 65 years of age or older. The median age was 41 years. For every 100 females, there were 104.8 males. For every 100 females age 18 and over, there were 97.0 males.

The median income for a household in the borough was $41,875, and the median income for a family was $47,813. Males had a median income of $31,875 versus $20,000 for females. The per capita income for the borough was $15,655. There were 14.3% of families and 10.2% of the population living below the poverty line, including 13.6% of under eighteens and 38.5% of those over 64.

== Notable people ==
- Larry Ross (1937–2016), member of the New Hampshire House of Representatives and officer of the United States Army
