= Pennsylvania Route 729 =

State highway in Clearfield County, Pennsylvania, US

Pennsylvania Route 729

Route information
- Maintained by PennDOT
- Length: 22.077 mi (35.529 km)

Major junctions
- South end: PA 253 / PA 453 in Gulich Township
- North end: US 219 / PA 879 in Grampian

Location
- Country: United States
- State: Pennsylvania
- Counties: Clearfield

Highway system
- Pennsylvania State Route System; Interstate; US; State; Scenic; Legislative
← PA 724	→ PA 731
← PA 824	→ PA 826

Pennsylvania Route 729 (PA 729) is a 22.07-mile-long (35.52 km), north–south state highway located in Clearfield County, Pennsylvania. The southern terminus is at PA 253/PA 453 in Gulich Township. The northern terminus is at US 219/PA 879 in Grampain.

== Route description ==
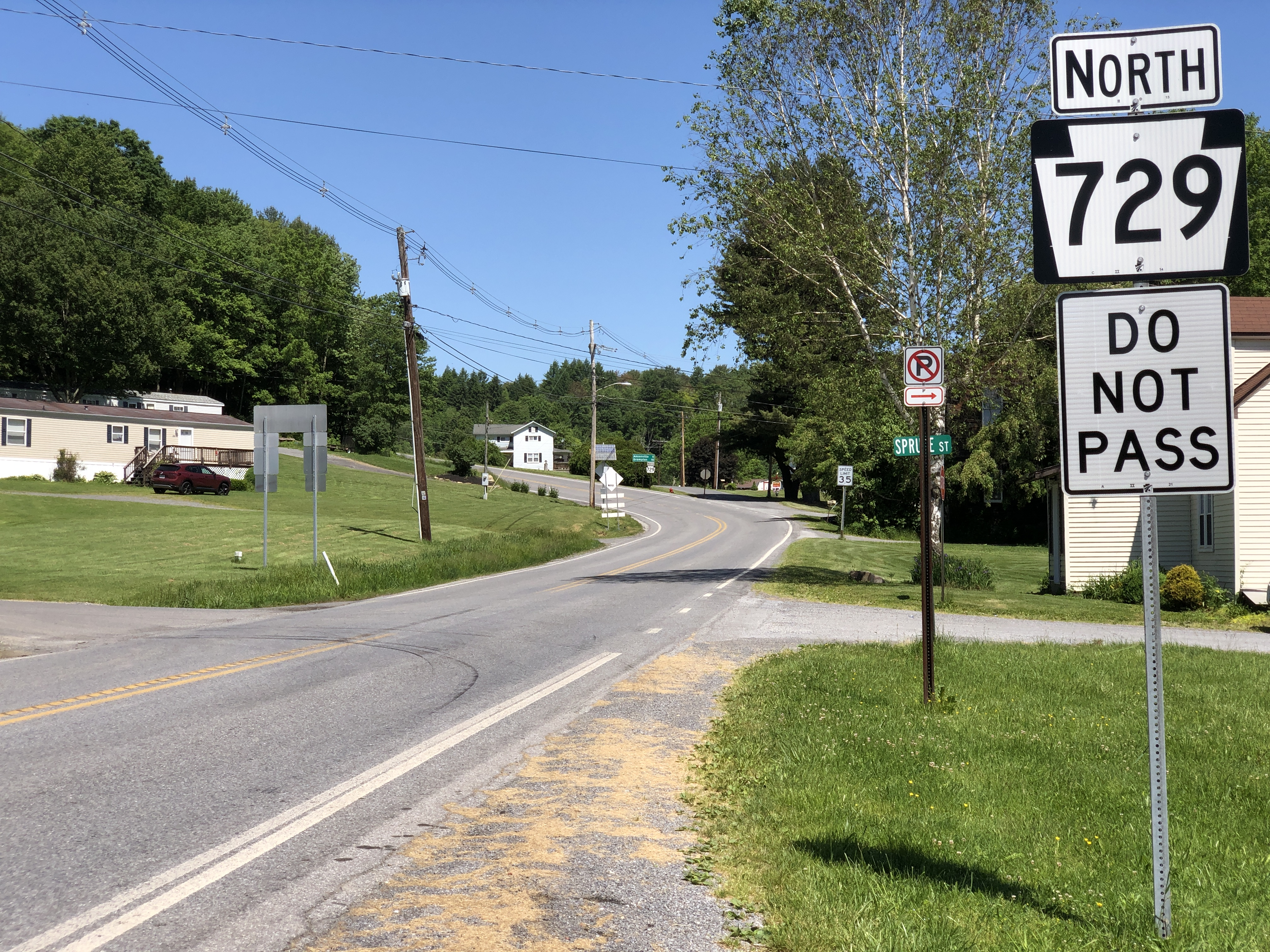
PA 729 northbound past PA 53 in Glen Hope

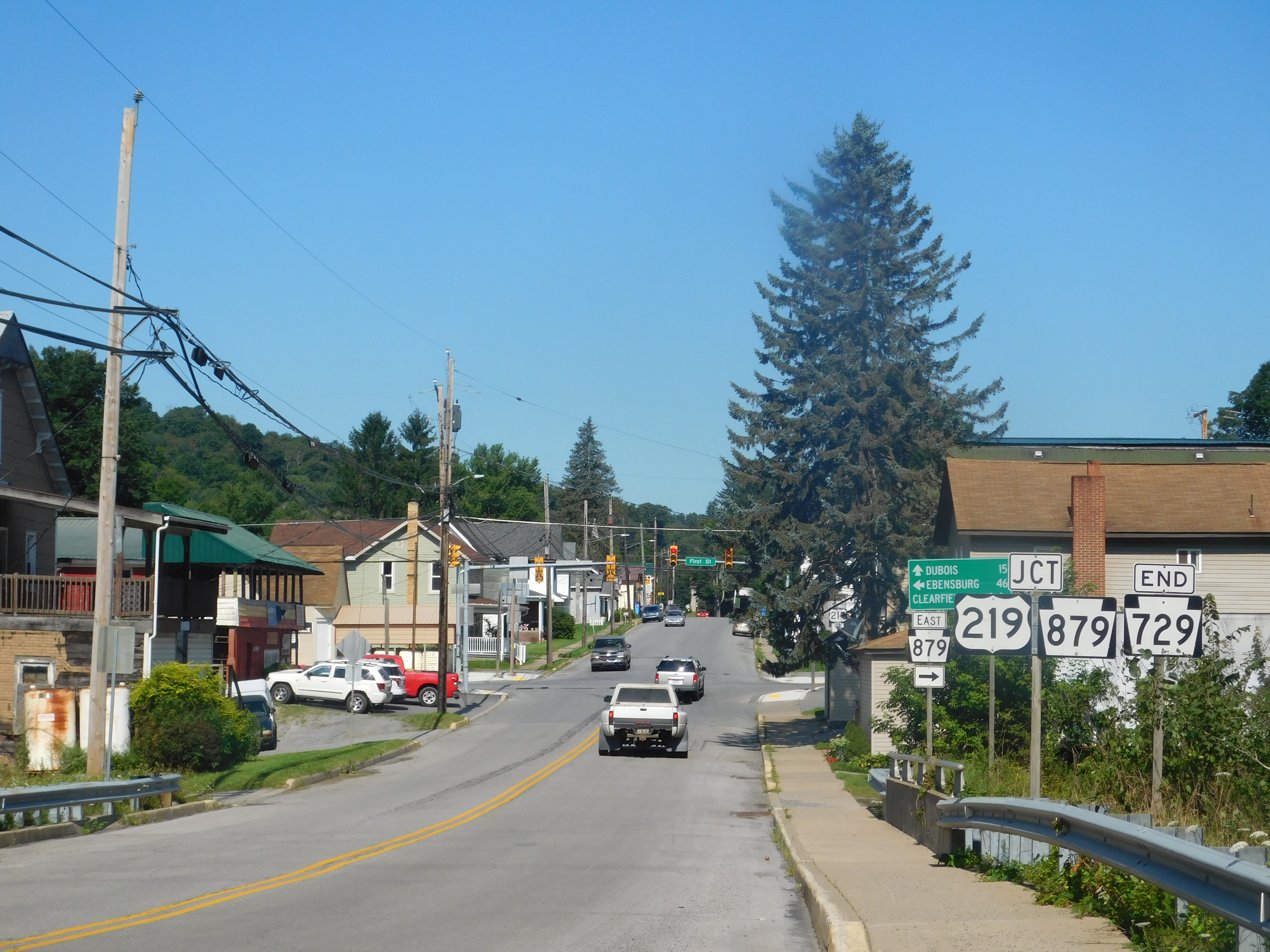
PA 729 approaching its end in Grampian

PA 729 is known by two names along its route. The two names it goes by are Main Street, and more commonly, the Tyrone Turnpike.

The route begins at the village of Janesville at an intersection of PA 253/PA 453. The route heads northwest to the borough of Glen Hope, where the route has an intersection with PA 53. The route continues north to the village of Lumber City. In the village, the route has a short concurrency with PA 969. The route continues north to the borough of Grampian, where the route terminates at an intersection with US 219 and PA 879.

== History ==
PA 729 was first signed in 1930, but as a short route in Berks County, from PA 100 (Then PA 62) to PA 29. In the mid-1940s, the route was decommissioned, but in 1969, the route number was revived for its current location today. A very small portion of the current route was signed as PA 825 during the 1930s and early 1940s.

== Major intersections ==
The entire route is in Clearfield County.

Location	mi	km	Destinations	Notes
Gulich Township	0.000	0.000	PA 253 / PA 453 (Viola Pike) – Glasgow, Tyrone, Houtzdale, Curwensville	Southern terminus
Glen Hope	5.778	9.299	PA 53 (Glen Hope Boulevard) – Coalport, Philipsburg	
Ferguson Township	17.870	28.759	PA 969 east (Lumber City Highway) – Curwensville	Southern terminus of concurrency
Ferguson Township	18.213	29.311	PA 969 west (Lumber City Highway) – Mahaffey	Northern terminus of concurrency
Grampian	22.077	35.529	US 219 / PA 879 north (Main Street / First Street) – Clearfield, DuBois, Ebensburg	Northern terminus
1.000 mi = 1.609 km; 1.000 km = 0.621 mi: Concurrency terminus
