= Curwensville Area School District =

School district in Pennsylvania

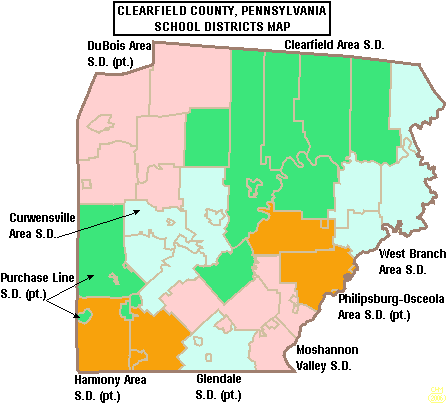

Address
- 650 Beech Street Curwensville, Clearfield County, Pennsylvania, 16833; United States

District information
- Type: Public

Students and staff
- District mascot: Golden Tide
- Colors: Black and Gold

Other information
- Website: curwensville.org

The Curwensville Area School District is a small, rural, public school district. It serves the residents of the Boroughs of Curwensville and Grampian and Ferguson Township, Greenwood Township, Penn Township and Pike Township in Clearfield County, Pennsylvania. Curwensville Area School District encompasses approximately 115 square miles (300 km^{2}). According to 2000 federal census data, Curwensville Area School District serves a resident population of 7,646. In 2009, Curwensville Area School District residents’ per capita income was $14,830, while the median family income in the District was just $38,107. In the Commonwealth of Pennsylvania, the median family income was $49,501 and the United States median family income was $49,445, in 2010.

== Schools ==
The district operates one Jr./Sr. High School, and two Elementary Schools.

- Curwensville Area Junior/Senior High School
- Curwensville Elementary School
- Penn Grampian Elementary School

== Extracurriculars ==
Curwensville Area School District offers a wide variety of clubs, activities and an extensive sports program. The district maintains an indoor pool which is open to the public some evenings. The Alan Fairman Community Recreation Center is also open to the public.
