= Curwensville Dam =

- Interactive map of Curwensville Dam
- Official name: Curwensville Dam
- Country: United States
- Location: Pike Township, near Curwensville, Pennsylvania
- Coordinates: 40°57′14″N 78°31′34″W

Dam and spillways
- Impounds: West Branch Susquehanna River
- Height: 131 ft (40 m)
- Length: 2,850 ft (870 m)

Reservoir
- Creates: West Branch Susquehanna River
- Total capacity: 124,200 acre-foot (153,000,000 m^{3})
- Normal elevation: 1,161 ft (354 m)

Curwensville Dam is located on the West Branch Susquehanna River about 0.6 miles (0.97 km) upstream from Curwensville in Clearfield County, Pennsylvania. The dam is an earth fill structure 2,850 feet (870 m) long, rising 131 feet (40 m) above the stream bed, with a spillway and gate-controlled outlet.

The reservoir, Curwensville Lake, has a storage capacity of 124,200 acre-foot (153,000,000 m^{3}) at spillway crest and extends 14 miles (23 km) upstream when filled to that level. The project controls a drainage area of 365 square miles (950 km^{2}) or 98 percent of the West Branch at Curwensville and 75 percent at Clearfield, PA.

The project is owned and operated by the United States Army Corps of Engineers. Clearfield County operates and maintains the recreation area which includes a beach, boat launch, picnic areas, athletic fields, playgrounds, picnic pavilions and a 43-site campground.
