= Ferguson Township, Pennsylvania =

Ferguson Township is the name of some places in the U.S. state of Pennsylvania:

- Ferguson Township, Centre County, Pennsylvania
- Ferguson Township, Clearfield County, Pennsylvania
