= Curwensville Area Junior/Senior High School =

Coordinates: 40.96729°N 78.51811°W

- 650 Beech Street; Curwensville, Pennsylvania

Information
- Type: Public
- Teaching staff: 39.73 (FTE)
- Grades: 7-12
- Enrollment: 432 (2023–2024)
- Student to teacher ratio: 10.87
- Campus type: Rural
- Colors: Black and gold
- Mascot: Golden Tide
- Website: https://hs.curwensville.org/en-US

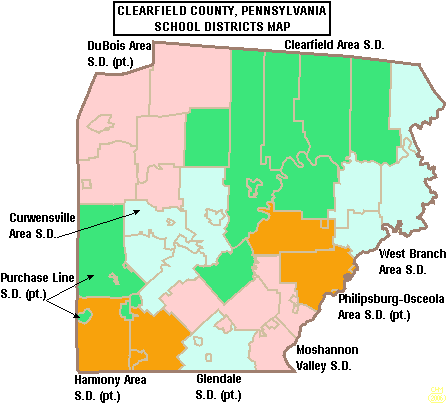
Map of Clearfield County, Pennsylvania public school districts

Curwensville Area Junior/Senior High School is a public high school located in the borough of Curwensville, Pennsylvania, United States. It serves students from most of south central Clearfield County. The school is part of the Curwensville Area School District. In the 2018–2019 school year there ere 480 students at the school.

== Extracurriculars ==
Curwensville Area School District offers a wide variety of clubs, activities and an extensive sports program. The district maintains an indoor pool which is open to the public some evenings. The Alan Fairman Community Recreation Center is also open to the public.

=== Sports ===
The District funds:

Boys

- Baseball - AA
- Basketball- AA
- Football - AA
- Wrestling - AA

Girls

- Basketball - AA
- Golf - AA
- Soccer (fall) - A
- Softball - A
- Volleyball - A
- Wrestling - AAAA

Junior high school sports

Boys

- Baseball
- Basketball
- Football
- Soccer
- Wrestling

Girls

- Basketball
- Softball
- Volleyball
- Cheerleading

According to PIAA directory October 2024
