= Larry Ross =

Larry Ross may refer to:

- Larry Ross (speedway rider) (born 1954), New Zealand speedway rider
- Larry Ross (ice hockey)
- Larry Ross (politician) (1937–2016), American politician

== See also ==
- Lawrence Ross, author of historical texts and fiction
- Lawrence Sullivan Ross, governor of Texas
