= Pennsylvania Route 731 =

State highway in Fulton County, Pennsylvania, US

Pennsylvania Route 731

Route information
- Maintained by PennDOT
- Length: 4.80 mi (7.72 km)
- Existed: 1964–present

Major junctions
- South end: PA 484 in Union Township
- North end: I-70 in Union Township

Location
- Country: United States
- State: Pennsylvania
- Counties: Fulton

Highway system
- Pennsylvania State Route System; Interstate; US; State; Scenic; Legislative
← PA 729	→ PA 732

Pennsylvania Route 731 (PA 731, designated by the Pennsylvania Department of Transportation as State Route 0731) is a 4.80-mile-long (7.72 km) state highway located in the southwest region of Fulton County, Pennsylvania. The route, known locally as Fairview Road and McKees Gap Road, begins at an intersection with PA 484 in Union Township. The highway heads northeast, through hilly regions before reaching the northern terminus at Interstate 70 (I-70) in Union Township. I-70 continues north to get to the Pennsylvania Turnpike, and south to pass into Maryland.

PA 731 was originally signed in 1930. It was assigned to a series of local roads north of Philadelphia. It was numbered this way until the PA 731 designation was removed in 1952. In 1964, the route was designated onto its current alignment.

== Route description ==
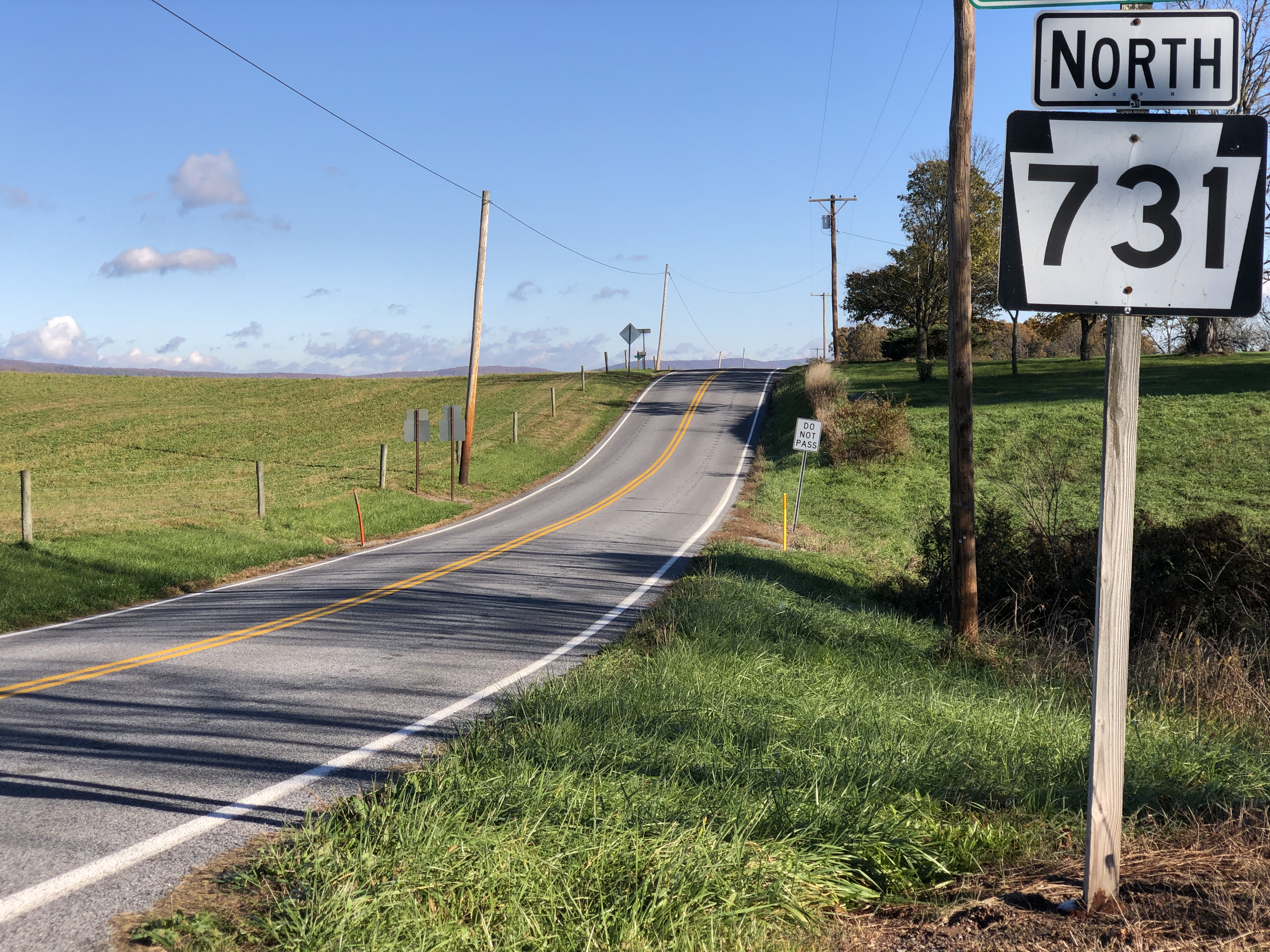
PA 731 northbound past PA 484 in Union Township

PA 731 begins at an intersection with PA 484 in the rural farmlands of Union Township. The highway, locally known as Fairview Road, progresses northeast and intersects with Zach's Ridge Road for the first time. Here, the highway turns left. After passing through a small wooded area, PA 731 comes to another intersection with McKees Gap Road, at which point it makes a right turn. The route now turns due east, and the woods break up at this point. A short distance later the road comes to the northern end of Zach's Ridge Road and soon after that Henderson Road, which is a long connector back to PA 484. Immediately after this, PA 731 comes to its terminus at an interchange with I-70. I-70 goes south towards the Pennsylvania / Maryland border and north to the Pennsylvania Turnpike.

== History ==
Originally, PA 731 was signed in 1930 for a series of roads to the north of Philadelphia in Montgomery County, connecting U.S. Route 309 in Fort Washington to PA 152 in Glenside. The route was around 4 miles long and included some of the larger, unmarked roads in the area. Later, in 1947, the route's eastern terminus was moved from Glenside to Fox Chase. Five years later, the PA 731 designation was removed. In 1964, the route was designated onto its current alignment in Fulton County. In August 2009, the Pennsylvania Department of Transportation completed reconstruction of the interchange with I-70.

== Major intersections ==
The entire route is in Union Township, Fulton County.

mi	km	Destinations	Notes
0.00	0.00	PA 484 (Buck Valley Road)	Southern terminus
4.80	7.72	I-70 – Breezewood, Hancock	Exit 163 (I-70); northern terminus
1.000 mi = 1.609 km; 1.000 km = 0.621 mi
