= Pennsylvania Route 484 =

State highway in Fulton County, Pennsylvania, US

Pennsylvania Route 484

Route information
- Maintained by PennDOT
- Length: 14.543 mi (23.405 km)

Major junctions
- West end: PA 26 in Union Township
- I-70 / US 522 in Warfordsburg
- East end: PA 655 near Warfordsburg

Location
- Country: United States
- State: Pennsylvania
- Counties: Fulton

Highway system
- Pennsylvania State Route System; Interstate; US; State; Scenic; Legislative
← PA 483	→ PA 487

Pennsylvania Route 484 (PA 484) is a 14.5-mile-long (23.3 km) state highway located in Fulton County in the U.S. state of Pennsylvania. The western terminus is at Pennsylvania Route 26 in Union Township. The eastern terminus is at Pennsylvania Route 655 near Warfordsburg.

== Route description ==
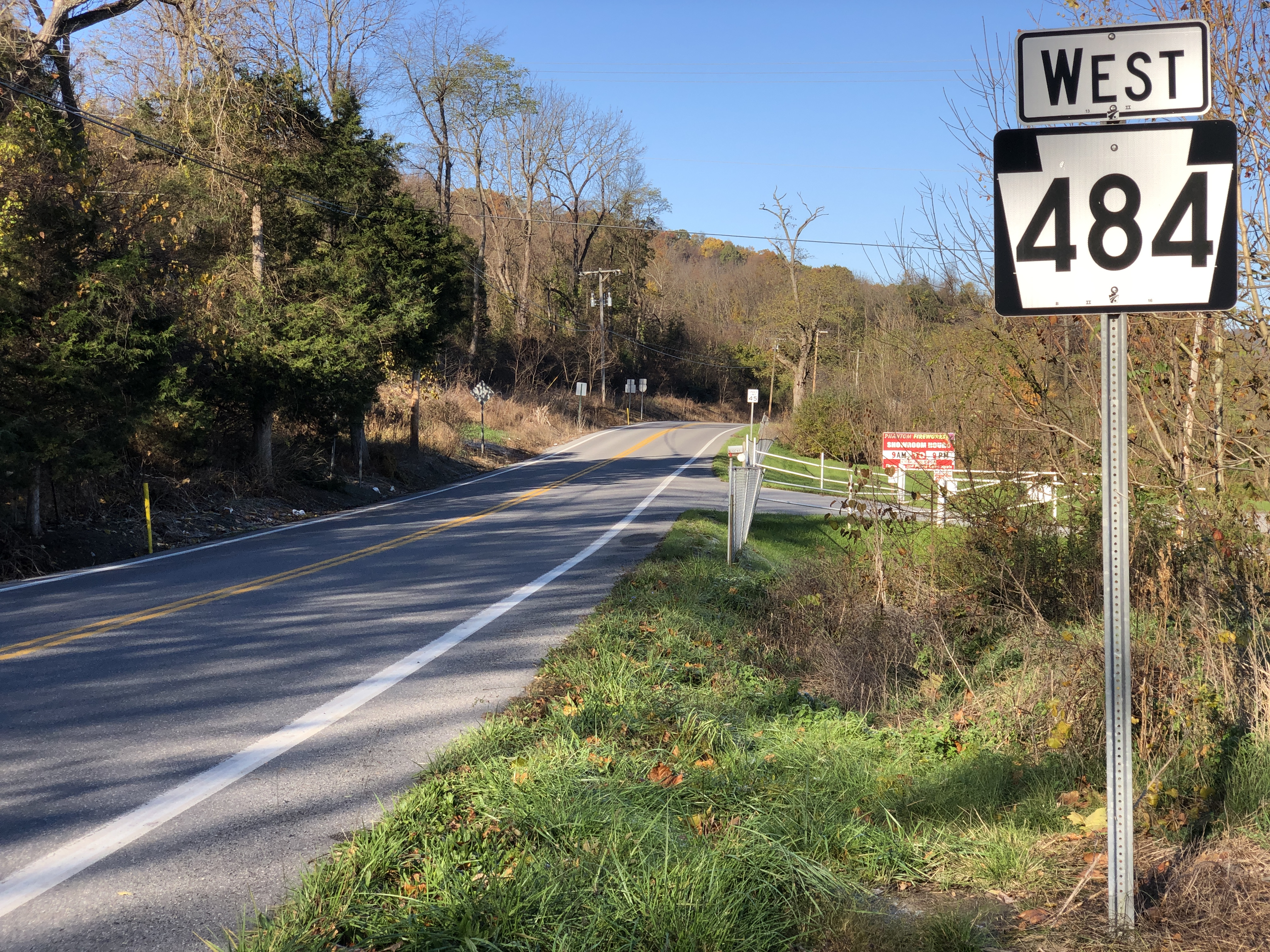
PA 484 westbound past I-70/US 522 in Warfordsburg

PA 484 begins at an intersection with PA 26 in Union Township, heading east on two-lane undivided Buck Valley Road. The route winds through rural areas of woods with some farms and homes, curving to the northeast. The road heads through more agricultural areas, making a turn to the east. PA 484 continues through farmland with some woods and residences, turning north and then east prior to heading east and intersecting PA 731 in Buck Valley. The route passes through Lashley prior to bending northeast and ascending forested Sideling Hill. At the top of the hill, the road heads into Bethel Township and descends Sideling Hill, turning east and enters wooded areas with some farms and homes and passing through Stoneybreak. PA 484 curves to the southeast and comes to an intersection with Great Cove Road that provides access to I-70/US 522, at which point there are a few businesses. The route continues through Warfordsburg prior to turning east onto Piegon Cove Road and passing over I-70/US 522. PA 484 curves northeast past farms before turning east onto Stillwell Road. The route winds east across forested Cove Ridge, crossing into Thompson Township and coming to its eastern terminus at PA 655.

== Major intersections ==
The entire route is in Fulton County.

Location	mi	km	Destinations	Notes
Union Township	0.0	0.0	PA 26 (South Clear Ridge Road) – Everett, Piney Grove	Western terminus
Union Township	6.5	10.5	PA 731 north (Fairview Road)	Southern terminus of PA 731
Bethel Township	12.7	20.4	Great Cove Road to I-70 / US 522 – Hancock, Breezewood, McConnellsburg	
Thompson Township	14.5	23.3	PA 655 (Thompson Road)	Eastern terminus
1.000 mi = 1.609 km; 1.000 km = 0.621 mi
