= William Clark Helmbold =

American classical scholar and translator (1908–1969)

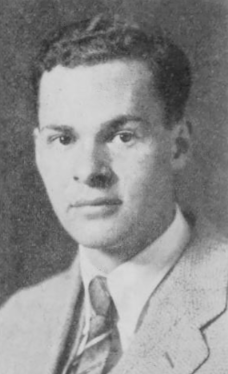
- Born: April 3, 1908; Curwensville, Pennsylvania, US
- Died: January 10, 1969 (aged 60)
- Education: Oberlin College; University of Oxford
- Occupations: Academic, translator
- Spouse: Nancy Pearce Helmbold

William Clark Helmbold (April 3, 1908 – January 10, 1969) was an American classical scholar and translator. His wife Nancy was also a classicist.

== Biography ==
William Clark Helmbold was born in Curwensville, Pennsylvania on April 3, 1908.

He earned a bachelor's degree at Oberlin College, then went to the University of Oxford on a Rhodes Scholarship.

He died on January 10, 1969.

== Reviews ==
- Einarson, Benedict (October 1958). "Plutarch's 'Moralia'. Harold Cherniss, William C. Helmbold". Classical Philology. 53 (4): 263–264.
- Russell, D. A. (1959). "The Loeb Plutarch – Harold Cherniss and William C. Helmbold: Plutarch, Moralia. Vol. xii. With an English translation. (Loeb Classical Library.) Pp. xii+590. London: Heinemann, 1957. Cloth, 15s. net". The Classical Review. 9 (3): 246–247.
