= Bridge in Greenwood Township =

- U.S. National Register of Historic Places
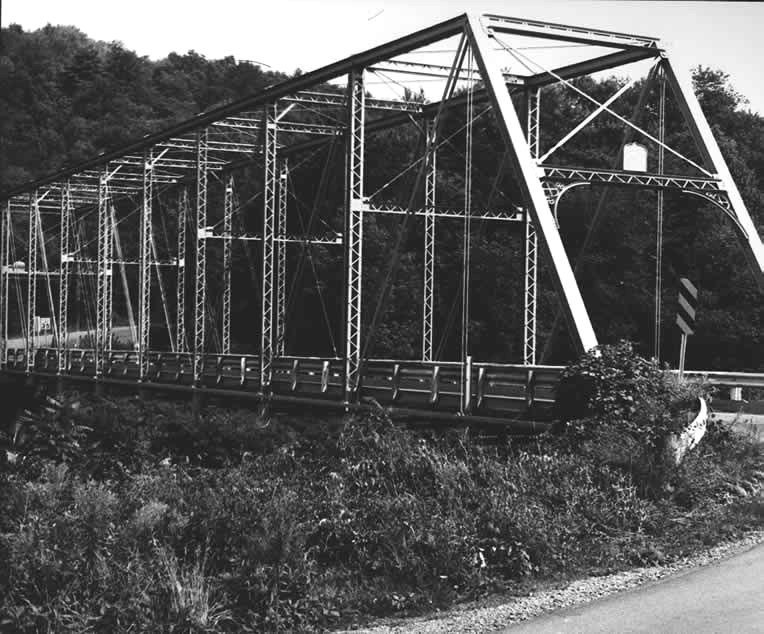
- Side and end of the bridge

- Location within Pennsylvania Location within the United States
- Nearest city: Bells Landing, Pennsylvania
- Coordinates: 40°54′39″N 78°38′51″W
- Built: 1892
- Architectural style: Pratt through truss
- MPS: Highway Bridges Owned by the Commonwealth of Pennsylvania, Department of Transportation TR
- NRHP reference No.: 88000846
- Added to NRHP: June 22, 1988

Bridge in Greenwood Township was an historic Pratt through truss bridge located in Bells Landing, Clearfield County, Pennsylvania, United States. It was built over the West Branch Susquehanna River in 1892 by the King Bridge Company.

It was listed on the National Register of Historic Places in 1988. It is now torn down and replaced with a modern bridge.

== See also ==
- National Register of Historic Places listings in Clearfield County, Pennsylvania
