= Nancy Pearce Helmbold =

American Latinist (1918–2007)

Nancy Pearce Helmbold (1918–2007) was an American Latinist. Her husband was also a classicist.

In 1963, Nancy Pearce Helmbold joined the University of Chicago, where she taught Latin at various levels, including summer courses and graduate-level introductory classes. After retiring in 1989, she received the Burlington Northern Faculty Achievement Award for her teaching and continued teaching into her eighties.
