= Greenwood Township, Clearfield County, Pennsylvania =

Township in Pennsylvania, US

Coordinates: 40°52′20″N 78°39′59″W

- Township
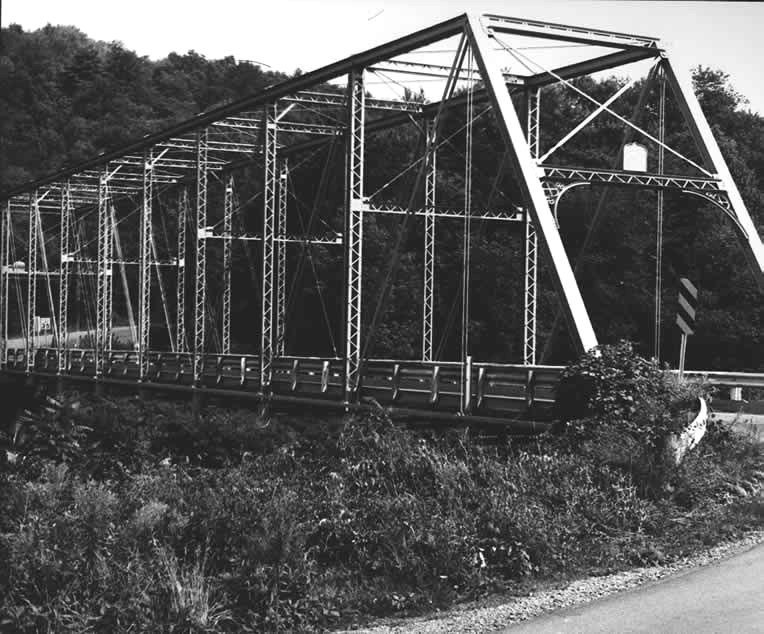
- The Bridge in Greenwood Township

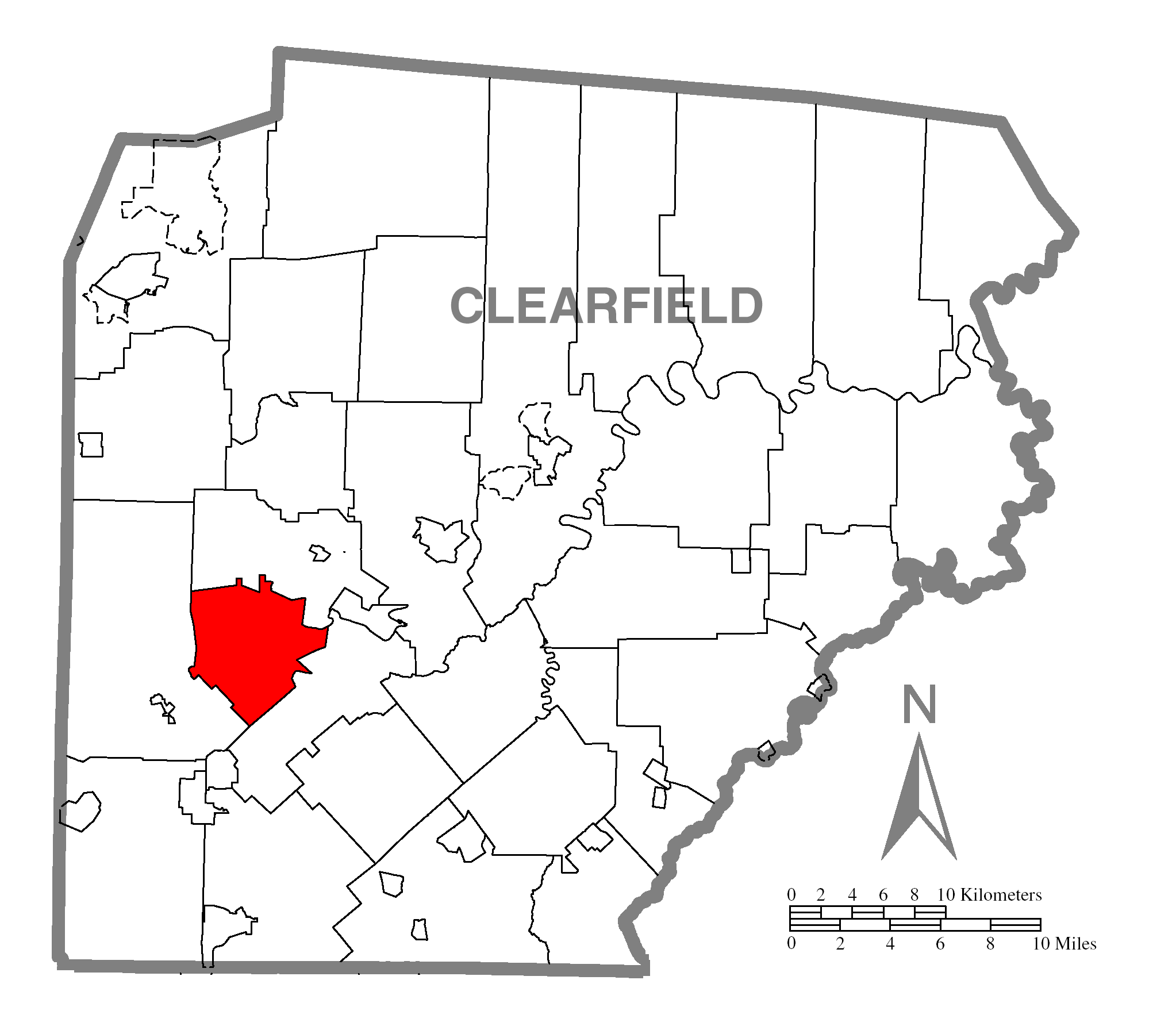
- Map of Clearfield County, Pennsylvania highlighting Greenwood Township

- Map of Clearfield County, Pennsylvania
- Country: United States
- State: Pennsylvania
- County: Clearfield
- Settled: 1828
- Incorporated: 1875

Area
  - Total: 20.70 sq mi (53.61 km^{2})
  - Land: 20.41 sq mi (52.87 km^{2})
  - Water: 0.28 sq mi (0.73 km^{2})

Population (2020)
  - Total: 363 ▼
  - Estimate (2022): 359 ▼
  - Density: 18.0/sq mi (6.94/km^{2})
- Time zone: UTC-5 (Eastern (EST))
  - Summer (DST): UTC-4 (EDT)
- Area code: 814
- FIPS code: 42-033-31376

Greenwood Township is a township in Clearfield County, Pennsylvania, United States. The township has a population of 363 people, according to the 2020 United States census. Between Mahaffey and Grampian on U.S. Route 219, Greenwood Township contains the villages of Curry Run and Bells Landing. The West Branch of the Susquehanna River passes through it, along with several abandoned and presently used railroad grades.

== Geography ==
According to the United States Census Bureau, the township has a total area of 20.1 square miles (52 km^{2}), of which 19.8 square miles (51 km^{2}) is land and 0.3 square miles (0.78 km^{2}) (1.30%) is water. The Bridge in Greenwood Township, which is on the National Register of Historic Places, is located in Bells Landing, and crosses the West Branch of the Susquehanna River.

== Communities ==
- Bells Landing
- Bower
- Camp Corbly
- Cherry Corner
- Curry Run

== Demographics ==
Historical population
Census	Pop.	Note	%±
2000	424		—
2010	372		−12.3%
2020	363		−2.4%
2022 (est.)	359		−1.1%
U.S. Decennial Census

As of the census of 2000, there were 424 people, 161 households, and 128 families residing in the township. The population density was 21.4 people per square mile (8.3/km^{2}). There were 214 housing units at an average density of 10.8/sq mi (4.2/km^{2}). The racial makeup of the township was 99.29% White, and 0.71% from two or more races. Hispanic or Latino of any race were 0.71% of the population.

There were 161 households, out of which 31.1% had children under the age of 18 living with them, 65.2% were married couples living together, 9.3% had a female householder with no husband present, and 19.9% were non-families. 19.9% of all households were made up of individuals, and 6.8% had someone living alone who was 65 years of age or older. The average household size was 2.63 and the average family size was 3.01.

In the township the population was spread out, with 24.3% under the age of 18, 6.8% from 18 to 24, 28.8% from 25 to 44, 27.8% from 45 to 64, and 12.3% who were 65 years of age or older. The median age was 40 years. For every 100 females there were 105.8 males. For every 100 females age 18 and over, there were 101.9 males.

The median income for a household in the township was $37,750, and the median income for a family was $40,694. Males had a median income of $28,281 versus $17,500 for females. The per capita income for the township was $15,945. About 3.9% of families and 6.6% of the population were below the poverty line, including 10.4% of those under age 18 and 3.5% of those age 65 or over.

== Education ==
Students in the township are served by the Curwensville Area School District.
