= Glen Hope, Pennsylvania =

Borough in Pennsylvania, US

- Borough
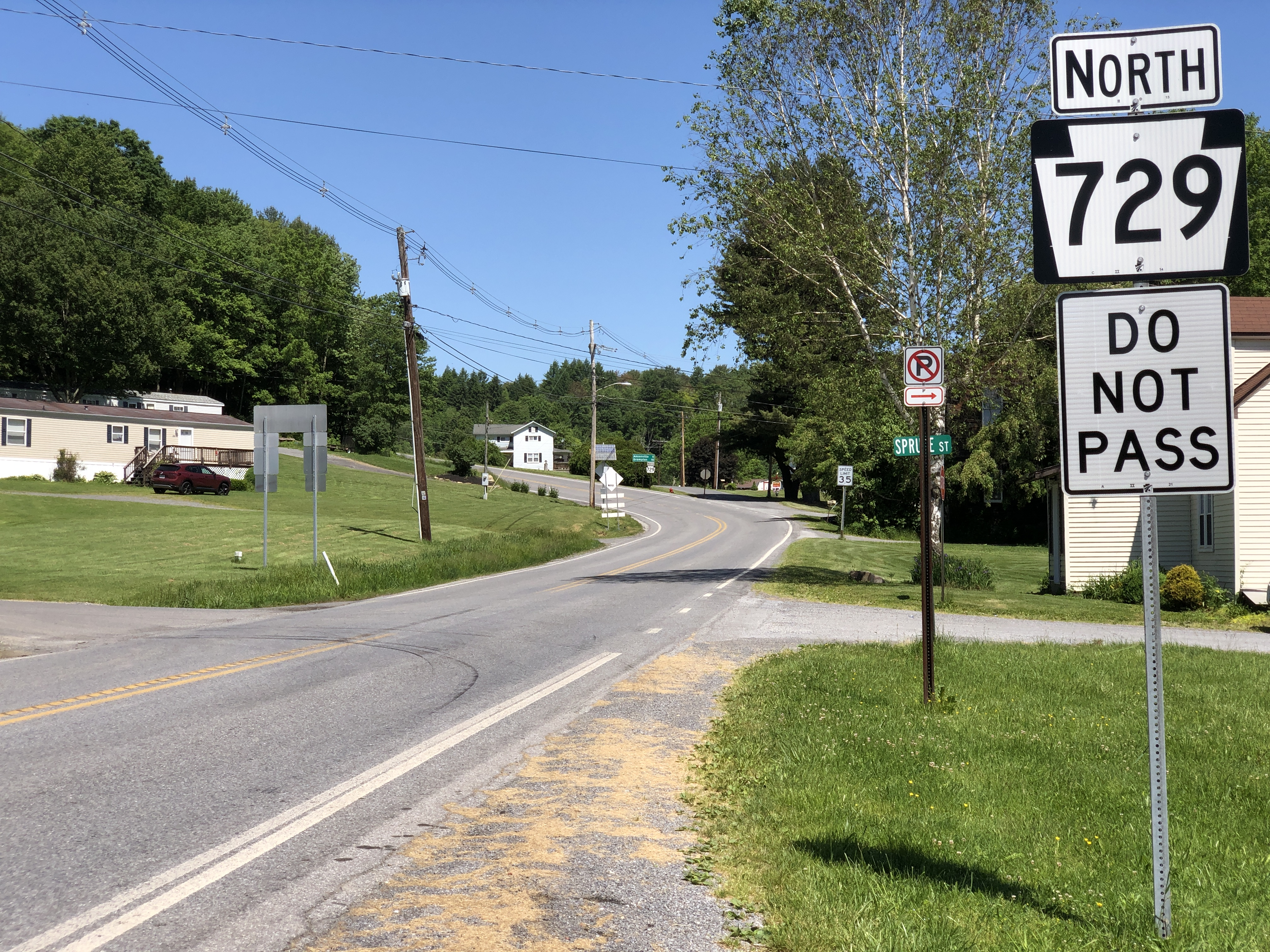
- Tyrone Pike (PA 729) in Glen Hope

- Location of Glen Hope in Clearfield County, Pennsylvania.

- Map showing Clearfield County in Pennsylvania

- Pennsylvania Glen Hope (the United States)
- Coordinates: 40°47′56″N 78°30′01″W
- Country: United States
- State: Pennsylvania
- County: Clearfield
- Incorporated: 1878

Government
  - Type: Borough Council

Area
  - Total: 2.17 sq mi (5.63 km^{2})
  - Land: 2.13 sq mi (5.52 km^{2})
  - Water: 0.046 sq mi (0.12 km^{2})
- Elevation: 1,370 ft (420 m)

Population (2020)
  - Total: 127
  - Density: 59.6/sq mi (23.03/km^{2})
- Time zone: UTC-5 (Eastern (EST))
  - Summer (DST): UTC-4 (EDT)
- ZIP code: 16645
- Area code: 814
- FIPS code: 42-29632

Glen Hope is a borough in Clearfield County, Pennsylvania, United States. The population was 127 at the 2020 census.

== Geography ==
Glen Hope is located in southern Clearfield County at 40°47′56″N 78°30′1″W (40.798959, -78.500320), primarily on the northern side of Clearfield Creek, a northeastward-flowing tributary of the West Branch Susquehanna River. Pennsylvania Route 53 passes through the borough, leading northeast 4 miles (6 km) to Madera and southwest 4 miles (6 km) to Irvona. Pennsylvania Route 729 crosses Clearfield Creek and PA-53 in the center of town and leads northwest 16 miles (26 km) to Grampian and southeast 5 miles (8 km) to Janesville.

According to the United States Census Bureau, Glen Hope has a total area of 2.2 square miles (5.6 km^{2}), of which 0.04 square miles (0.1 km^{2}), or 2.06%, is water.

== Demographics ==
Historical population
Census	Pop.	Note	%±
1880	164		—
1890	286		74.4%
1900	220		−23.1%
1910	237		7.7%
1920	295		24.5%
1930	187		−36.6%
1940	185		−1.1%
1950	199		7.6%
1960	169		−15.1%
1970	163		−3.6%
1980	206		26.4%
1990	187		−9.2%
2000	149		−20.3%
2010	142		−4.7%
2020	127		−10.6%
2021 (est.)	124	▼	−2.4%

As of the census of 2000, there were 149 people, 55 households, and 44 families residing in the borough. The population density was 72.0 inhabitants per square mile (27.8/km^{2}). There were 59 housing units at an average density of 28.5 per square mile (11.0/km^{2}). The racial makeup of the borough was 99.33% White, and 0.67% from two or more races.

There were 55 households, out of which 29.1% had children under the age of 18 living with them, 67.3% were married couples living together, 9.1% had a female householder with no husband present, and 18.2% were non-families. 14.5% of all households were made up of individuals, and 10.9% had someone living alone who was 65 years of age or older. The average household size was 2.71 and the average family size was 3.00.

In the borough the population was spread out, with 19.5% under the age of 18, 8.1% from 18 to 24, 28.2% from 25 to 44, 26.2% from 45 to 64, and 18.1% who were 65 years of age or older. The median age was 42 years. For every 100 females there were 93.5 males. For every 100 females age 18 and over, there were 96.7 males.

The median income for a household in the borough was $35,625, and the median income for a family was $42,500. Males had a median income of $31,250 versus $31,250 for females. The per capita income for the borough was $13,321. There were 14.6% of families and 15.7% of the population living below the poverty line, including 25.0% of under eighteens and 7.7% of those over 64.
