= Larry Ross (politician) =

American military officer and politician

Member of the New Hampshire House of Representatives from the Hillsborough 44th district
- In office 2002–2004

Member of the New Hampshire House of Representatives from the Hillsborough 3rd district
- In office 2004–2006

Personal details
- Born: Lawrence Calvin Ross; November 6, 1937 Lumber City, Pennsylvania, U.S.
- Died: March 21, 2016 (aged 78) Beaufort, South Carolina, U.S.
- Party: Republican
- Education: Purdue University; Northeastern University
- Occupation: Military officer

Lawrence Calvin Ross (November 6, 1937 – March 21, 2016) was an American military officer and politician. A member of the Republican Party, he served in the New Hampshire House of Representatives from 2002 to 2006.

== Life and career ==
Ross was born in Lumber City, Pennsylvania, the son of Wilbur and Nellie Ross. He attended Clinton High School, graduating at the age of sixteen. After graduating, he attended the United States Military Academy. He served as an officer in the United States Army, and was post commander of the army's Mechanics and Materials Research Center in Watertown, Massachusetts. During his military service, he attended Purdue University, earning his master's degree in engineering. He also attended Northeastern University, earning his MBA degree. He retired from his military service in 1985, retiring at the rank of colonel.

Ross served in the New Hampshire House of Representatives from 2002 to 2006.

== Death ==
Ross died on March 21, 2016, in Beaufort, South Carolina, at the age of 78.
