= Curwensville Lake =

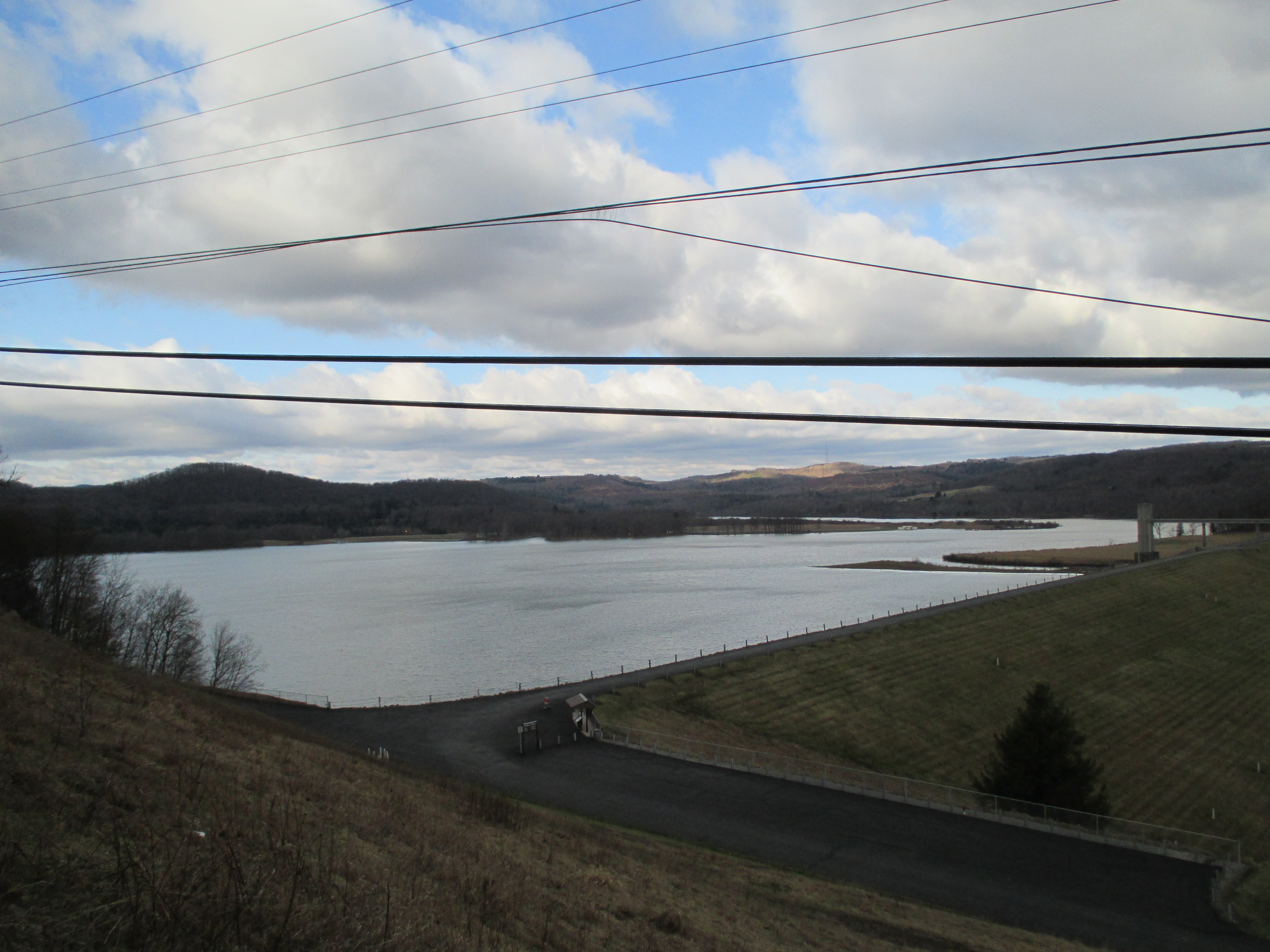
- View of Curwensville Lake looking west from PA State Route 453.

- Location within Pennsylvania Location within the United States
- Location: Clearfield County, Pennsylvania, United States
- Coordinates: 40°57′15″N 78°31′36″W
- Type: reservoir
- Basin countries: United States
- Surface elevation: 1,161 ft (354 m)

Curwensville Lake is a reservoir located just to the south of the town of Curwensville, Pennsylvania. The lake was formed due to the construction of the Curwensville Dam to the north of the lake. Before the dam was built, there were several floods occurring along the West Branch Susquehanna River, affecting the towns of Curwensville, and Clearfield to the north. On September 3, 1954, a Flood Control Act was passed due to the flooding along the West Branch river basin. The dam cost $20,400,000 to construct.
