= Penn Township, Clearfield County, Pennsylvania =

Township in Pennsylvania, US

Coordinates: 40°57′00″N 78°36′59″W

- Township
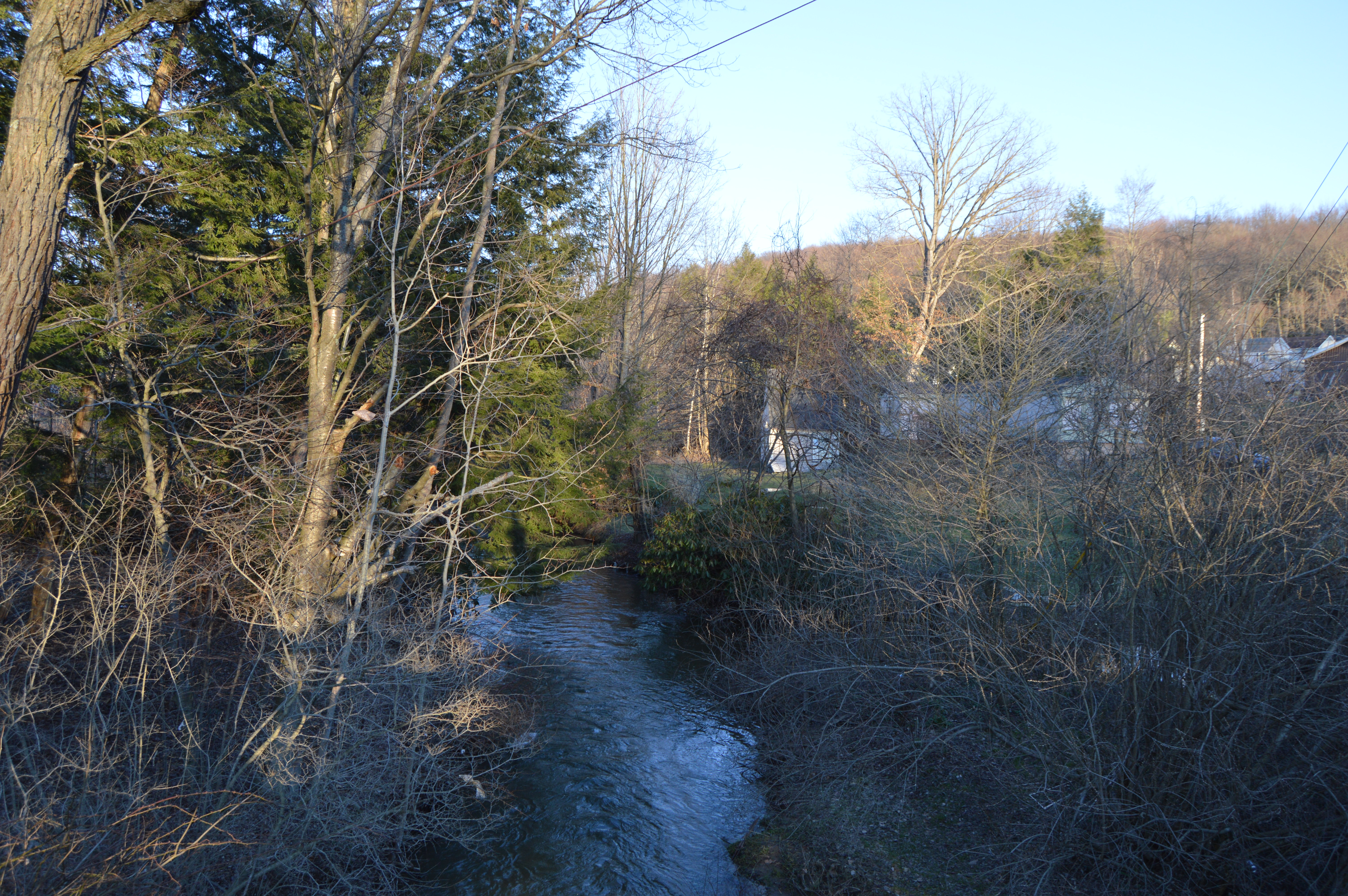
- Kratzler Run at Stronach

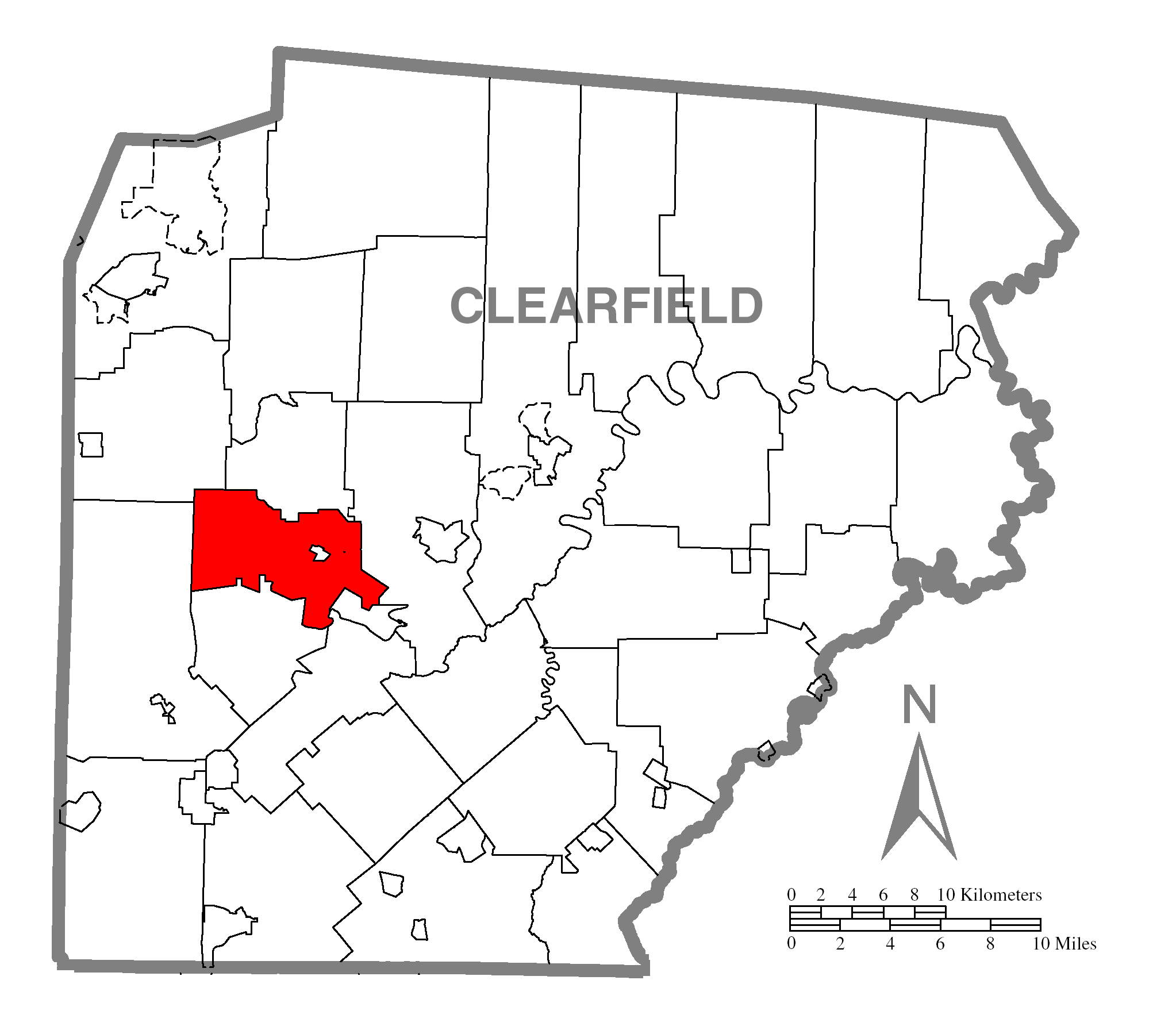
- Map of Clearfield County, Pennsylvania highlighting Penn Township

- Map of Clearfield County, Pennsylvania
- Country: United States
- State: Pennsylvania
- County: Clearfield
- Settled: 1805
- Incorporated: 1835

Area
  - Total: 24.23 sq mi (62.75 km^{2})
  - Land: 24.12 sq mi (62.47 km^{2})
  - Water: 0.11 sq mi (0.29 km^{2})

Population (2020)
  - Total: 1,203 ▼
  - Estimate (2021): 1,195
  - Density: 50.7/sq mi (19.59/km^{2})
- Time zone: UTC-5 (Eastern (EST))
  - Summer (DST): UTC-4 (EDT)
- Area code: 814
- FIPS code: 42-033-58816

Penn Township is a township in Clearfield County, Pennsylvania, United States. The population was 1,203 at the 2020 census.

== Geography ==
According to the United States Census Bureau, the township has a total area of 25.3 square miles (65.6 km^{2}), of which 25.3 square miles (65.5 km^{2}) is land and 0.04 square mile (0.1 km^{2}) (0.12%) is water.

== Communities ==
- Hepburnia
- Irishtown
- Stronach
- Walltown

== Demographics ==
Historical population
Census	Pop.	Note	%±
2000	1,326		—
2010	1,264		−4.7%
2020	1,203		−4.8%
2021 (est.)	1,195		−0.7%
U.S. Decennial Census

As of the census of 2000, there were 1,326 people, 514 households, and 391 families living in the township. The population density was 52.4 inhabitants per square mile (20.2/km^{2}). There were 568 housing units at an average density of 22.5/sq mi (8.7/km^{2}). The racial makeup of the township was 99.47% White, 0.08% African American, 0.08% Asian, 0.15% from other races, and 0.23% from two or more races. Hispanic or Latino of any race were 0.30% of the population.

There were 514 households, out of which 30.0% had children under the age of 18 living with them, 66.7% were married couples living together, 6.0% had a female householder with no husband present, and 23.9% were non-families. 21.4% of all households were made up of individuals, and 12.6% had someone living alone who was 65 years of age or older. The average household size was 2.58 and the average family size was 2.99.

In the township the population was spread out, with 22.9% under the age of 18, 7.2% from 18 to 24, 27.1% from 25 to 44, 26.8% from 45 to 64, and 16.0% who were 65 years of age or older. The median age was 41 years. For every 100 females there were 98.8 males. For every 100 females age 18 and over, there were 99.6 males.

The median income for a household in the township was $32,550, and the median income for a family was $38,000. Males had a median income of $27,850 versus $18,625 for females. The per capita income for the township was $13,994. About 7.7% of families and 10.7% of the population were below the poverty line, including 16.0% of those under age 18 and 11.0% of those age 65 or over.

== Education ==
Students in the township attend schools in the Curwensville Area School District.
