= Union Township, Fulton County, Pennsylvania =

Township in Pennsylvania, United States

Coordinates: 39°47′30″N 78°14′49″W

Union Township
- Township
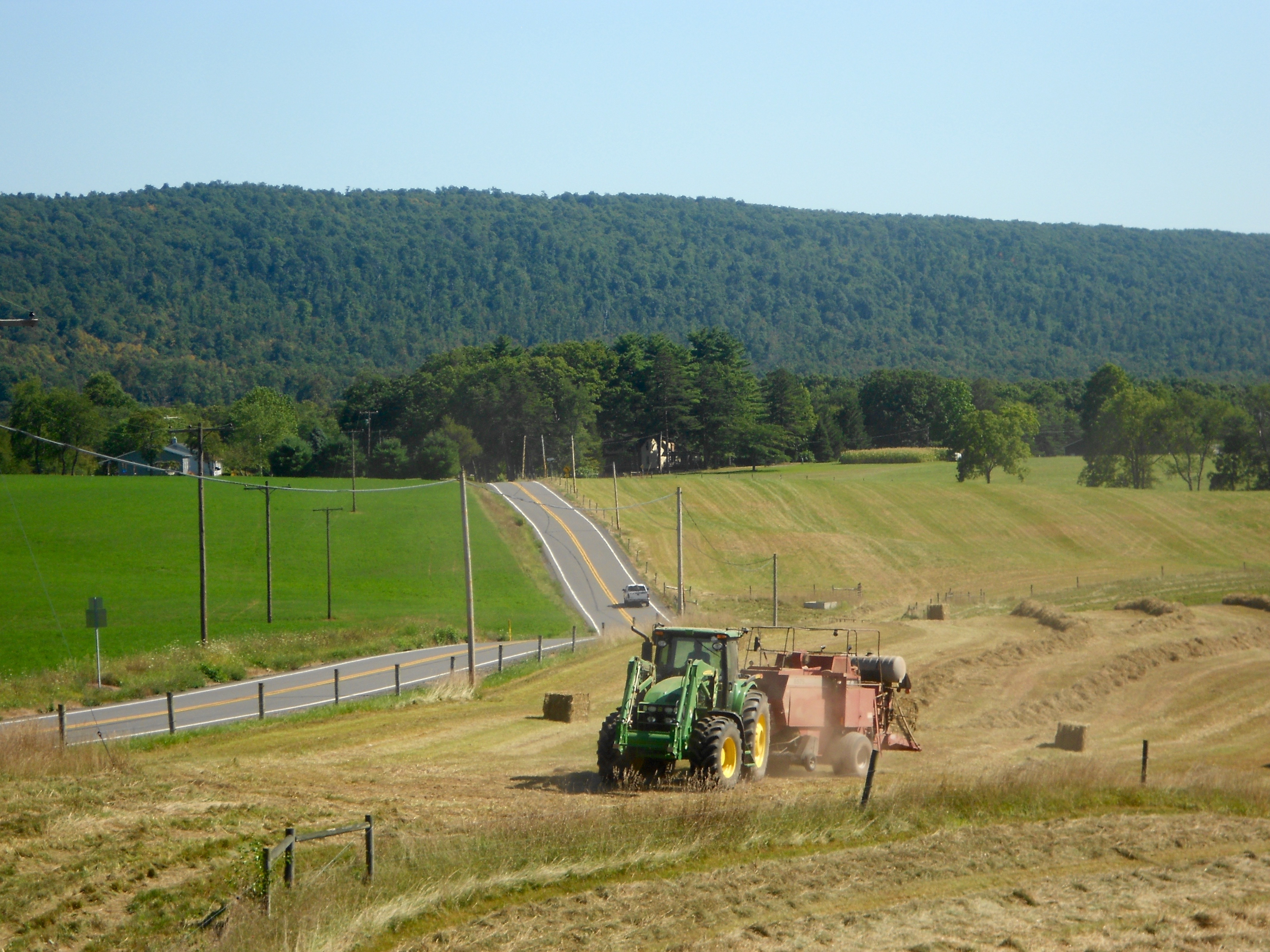
- Making hay in Buck Valley

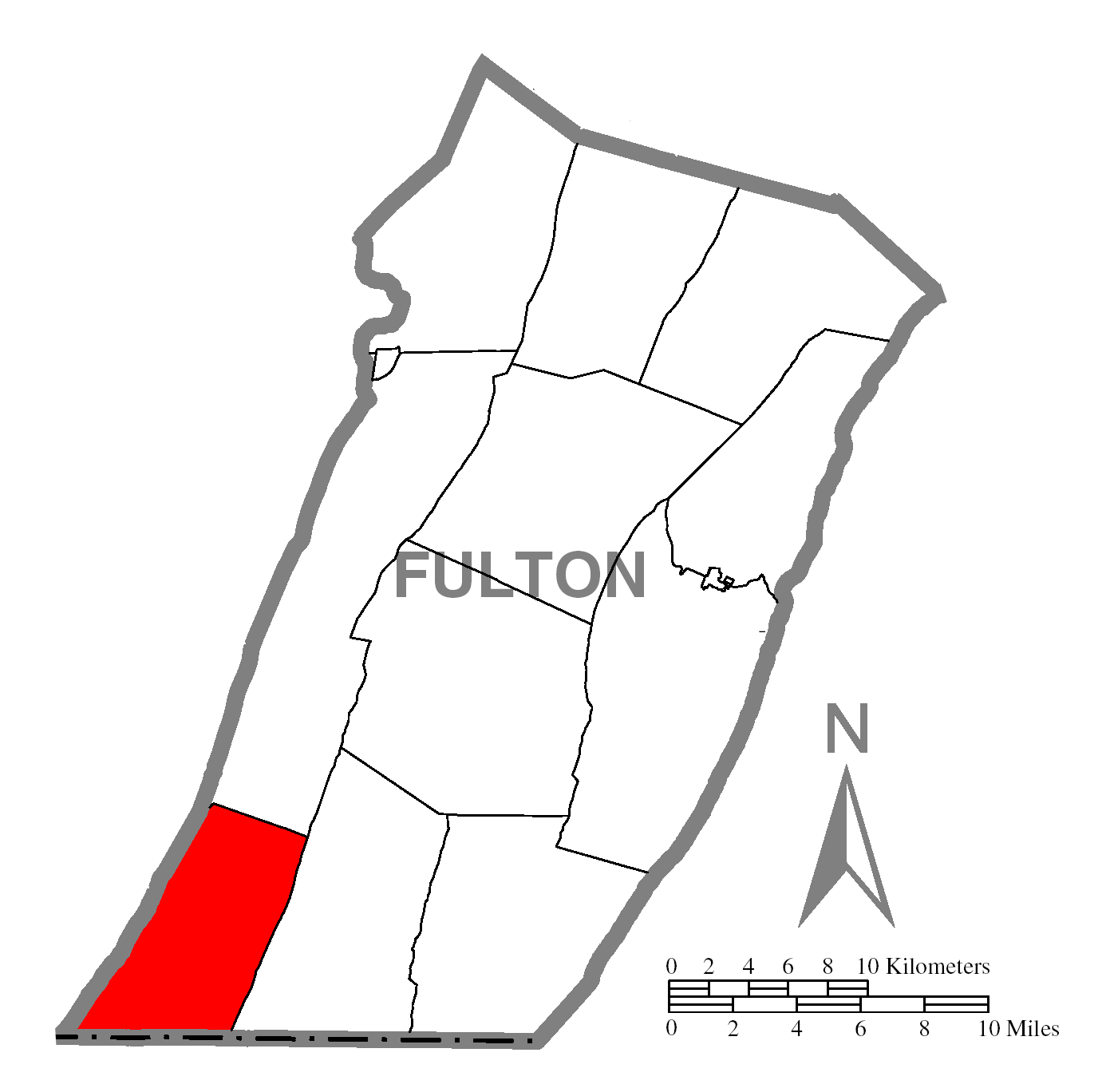
- Location of Union Township in Fulton County

- Location of Fulton County in Pennsylvania
- Country: United States
- State: Pennsylvania
- County: Fulton County
- Established: 1770

Area
  - Total: 30.50 sq mi (78.99 km^{2})
  - Land: 30.50 sq mi (78.99 km^{2})
  - Water: 0 sq mi (0.00 km^{2})

Population (2020)
  - Total: 748 ▲
  - Estimate (2023): 759
  - Density: 23.8/sq mi (9.18/km^{2})
- Time zone: UTC-4 (EST)
  - Summer (DST): UTC-5 (EDT)
- FIPS code: 42-057-78320

Union Township is a township located in Fulton County, Pennsylvania, United States. As of the 2020 census, the township had a total population of 748.

== Geography ==
According to the United States Census Bureau, the township has a total area of 30.5 square miles (79.0 km^{2}), all land.

== Recreation ==
Portions of the Buchanan State Forest, Pennsylvania State Game Lands Number 49 and Number 128 are located in the township.

== Demographics ==
Historical population
Census	Pop.	Note	%±
2000	634		—
2010	706		11.4%
2020	748		5.9%
2023 (est.)	759		1.5%
U.S. Decennial Census

As of the census of 2000, there were 634 people, 245 households, and 185 families residing in the township. The population density was 20.8 people per square mile (8.0/km^{2}). There were 326 housing units at an average density of 10.7/sq mi (4.1/km^{2}). The racial makeup of the township was 99.21% White, 0.16% African American, and 0.63% from two or more races.

There were 245 households, out of which 32.2% had children under the age of 18 living with them, 64.5% were married couples living together, 7.8% had a female householder with no husband present, and 24.1% were non-families. 20.0% of all households were made up of individuals, and 7.3% had someone living alone who was 65 years of age or older. The average household size was 2.59 and the average family size was 2.99.

Of the population, 24.8% were under the age of 18, 6.6% were from 18 to 24, 28.5% were from 25 to 44, 27.9% were from 45 to 64, and 12.1% were 65 years of age or older. The median age was 38 years. For every 100 females there were 111.3 males. For every 100 females age 18 and over, there were 103.8 males.

The median income for a household in the township was $35,865, and the median income for a family was $39,531. Males had a median income of $30,139 versus $17,232 for females. The per capita income for the township was $16,448. 9.2% of the population and 7.5% of families were below the poverty line. 6.5% of those under the age of 18 and 21.0% of those 65 and older were living below the poverty line.

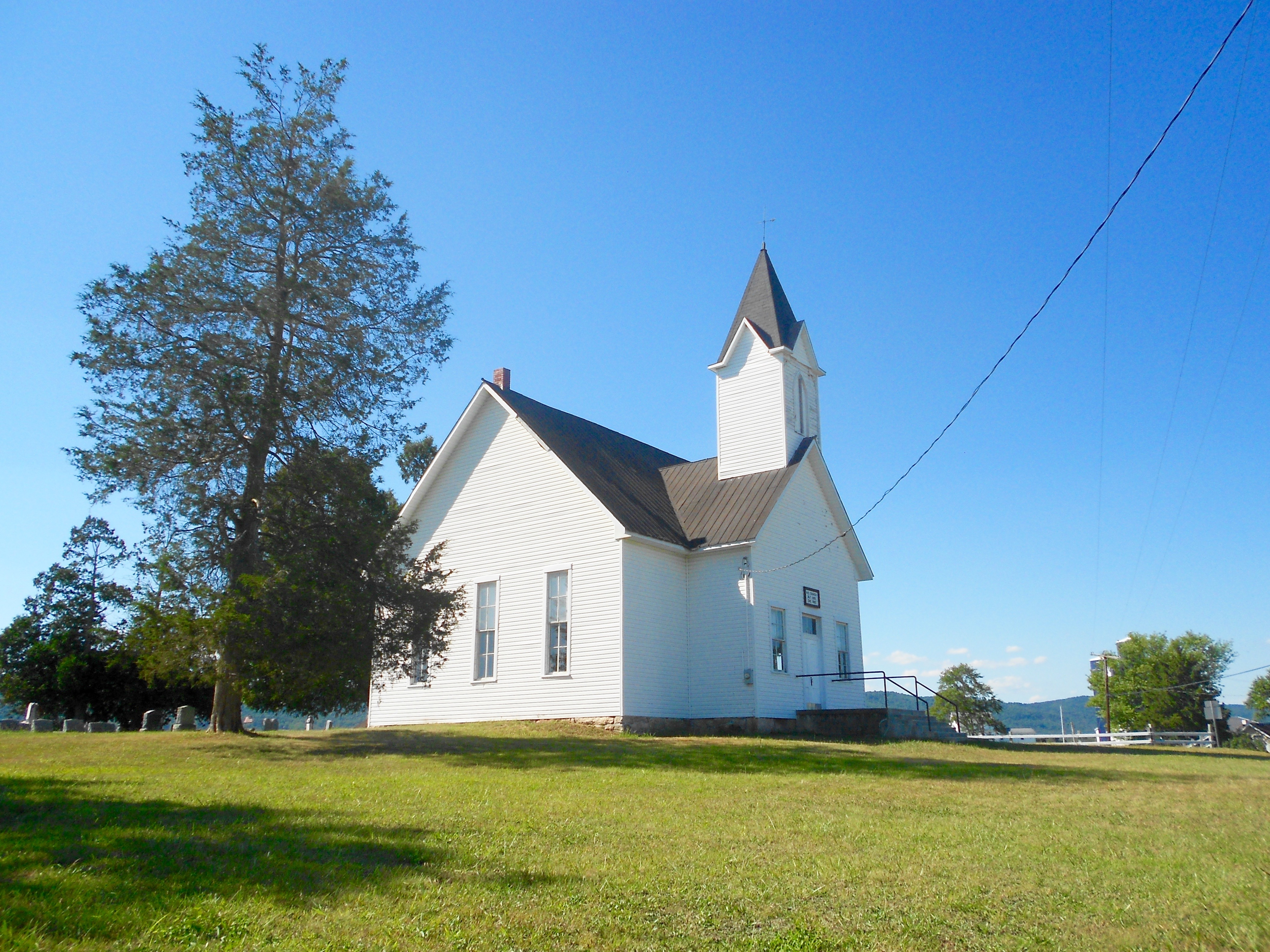
Buck Valley Methodist Church

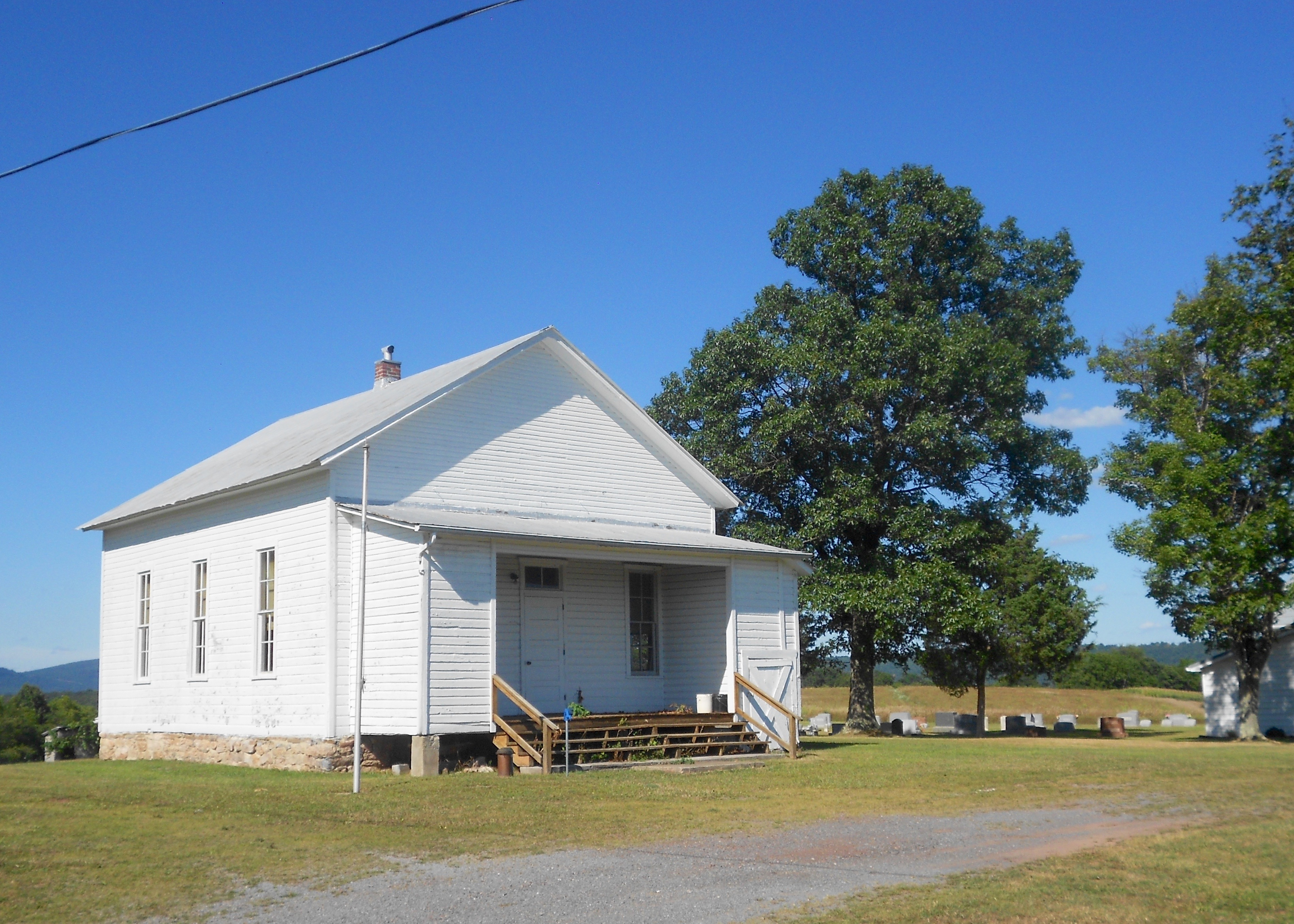
The old Brethren Church in Amaranth

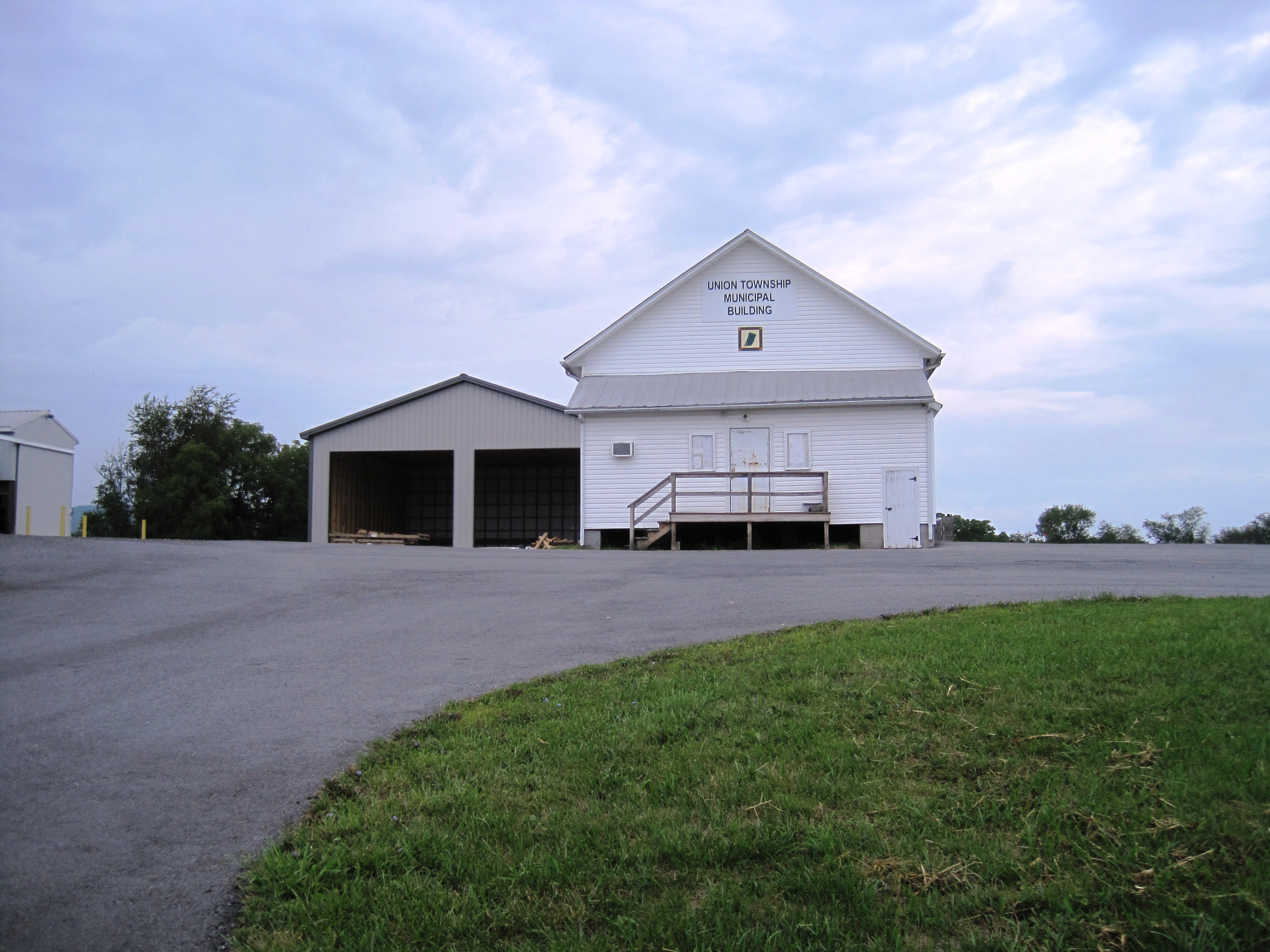
Town hall
