= Ferguson Township, Clearfield County, Pennsylvania =

Township in Pennsylvania, US

Coordinates: 40°52′00″N 78°36′59″W

- Township
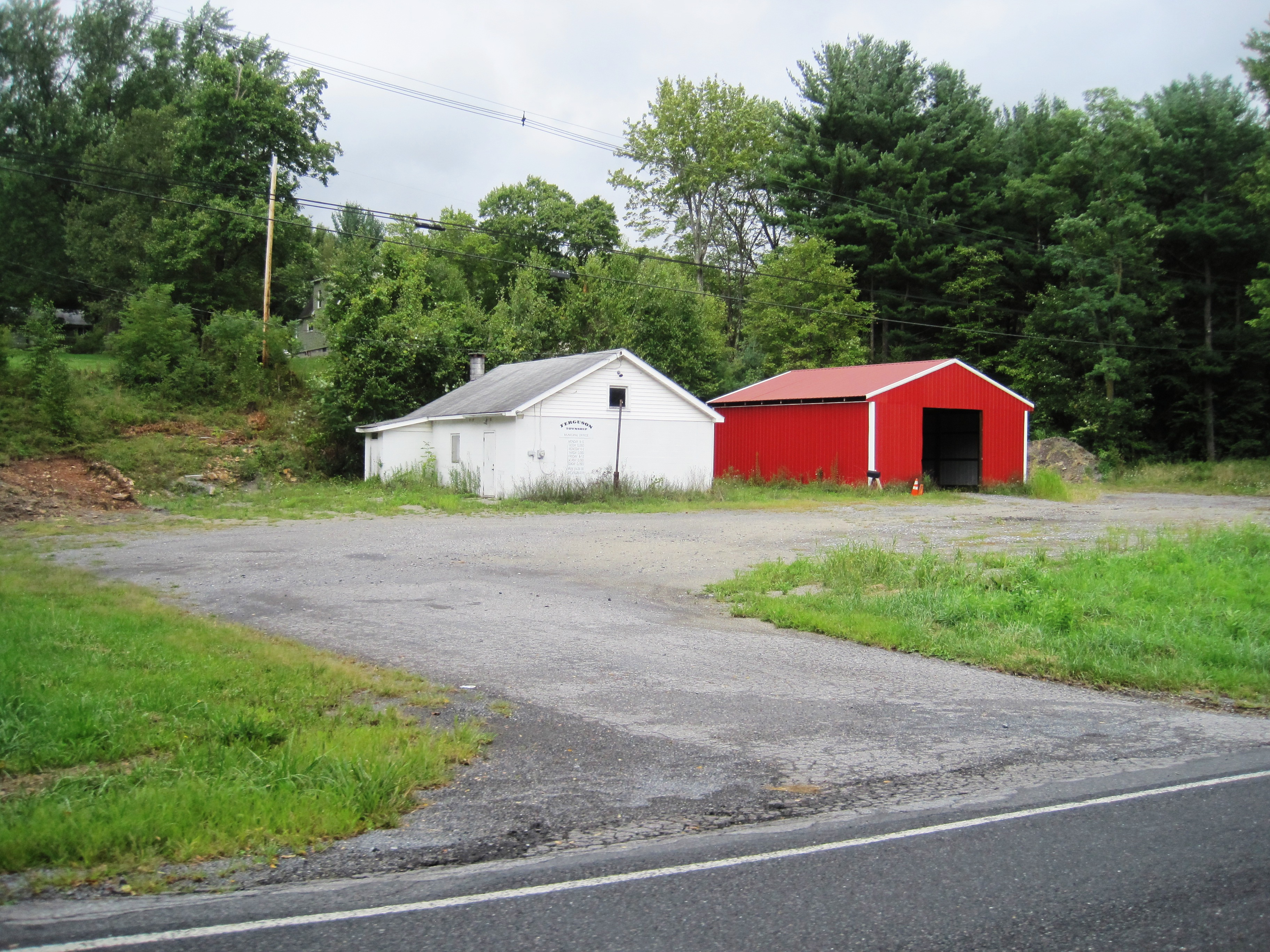
- Ferguson Municipal Building

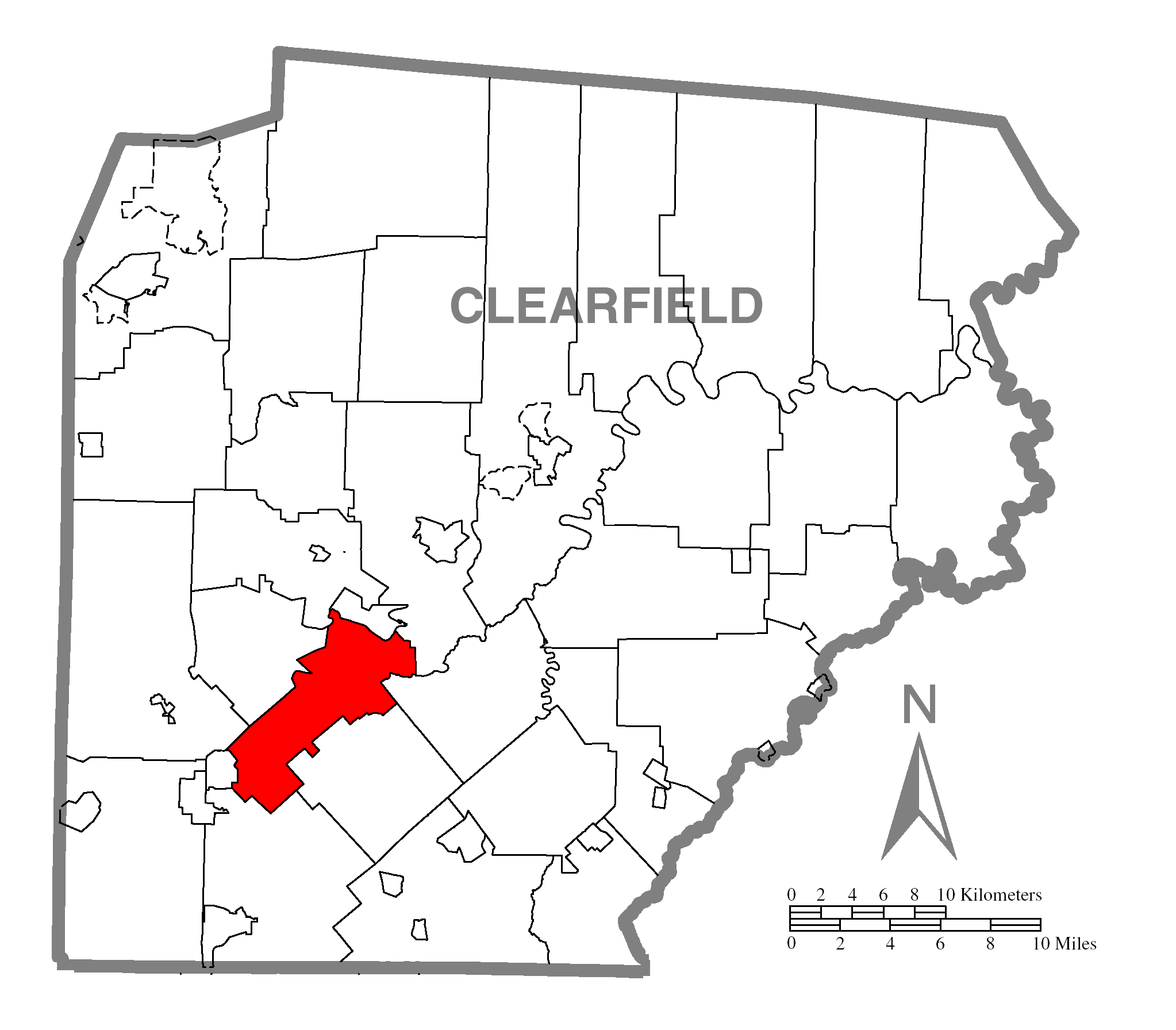
- Map of Clearfield County, Pennsylvania highlighting Ferguson Township

- Map of Clearfield County, Pennsylvania
- Country: United States
- State: Pennsylvania
- County: Clearfield
- Settled: 1806
- Incorporated: 1839

Area
  - Total: 26.31 sq mi (68.13 km^{2})
  - Land: 26.10 sq mi (67.61 km^{2})
  - Water: 0.20 sq mi (0.52 km^{2})

Population (2020)
  - Total: 545 ▲
  - Estimate (2022): 544 ▼
  - Density: 20.0/sq mi (7.72/km^{2})
- Time zone: UTC-5 (Eastern (EST))
  - Summer (DST): UTC-4 (EDT)
- Area code: 814
- FIPS code: 42-033-25632

Ferguson Township is a township in Clearfield County, Pennsylvania, United States. The population was 545 at the 2020 census.

== Geography ==
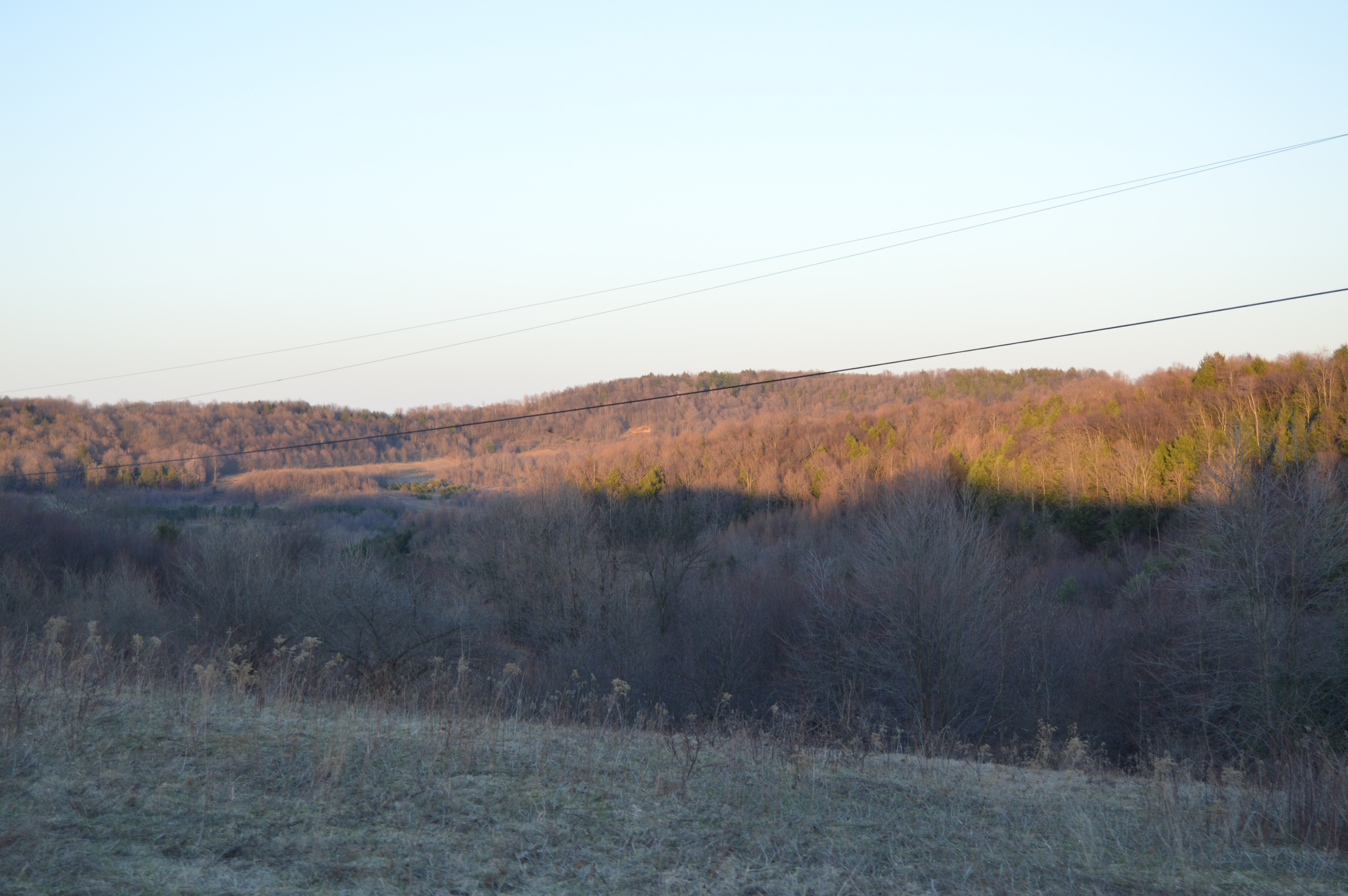
Forests along Cherry Corner Road

According to the United States Census Bureau, the township has a total area of 23.8 square miles (62 km^{2}), of which 23.6 square miles (61 km^{2}) is land and 0.2 square miles (0.52 km^{2}) (0.67%) is water.

== Communities ==
- Gazzam
- Lumber City as of January 6, 2014
- Marron

== Demographics ==
Historical population
Census	Pop.	Note	%±
2000	410		—
2010	444		8.3%
2020	545		22.7%
2022 (est.)	544		−0.2%
U.S. Decennial Census

As of the census of 2000, there were 410 people, 158 households, and 114 families living in the township. The population density was 17.4 people per square mile (6.7/km^{2}). There were 200 housing units at an average density of 8.5/sq mi (3.3/km^{2}). The racial makeup of the township was 99.27% White, 0.24% Asian, 0.24% Pacific Islander, 0.24% from other races.

There were 158 households, out of which 29.7% had children under the age of 18 living with them, 62.0% were married couples living together, 6.3% had a female householder with no husband present, and 27.8% were non-families. 24.7% of all households were made up of individuals, and 11.4% had someone living alone who was 65 years of age or older. The average household size was 2.59 and the average family size was 3.10.

In the township the population was spread out, with 24.9% under the age of 18, 8.0% from 18 to 24, 28.3% from 25 to 44, 22.0% from 45 to 64, and 16.8% who were 65 years of age or older. The median age was 37 years. For every 100 females there were 105.0 males. For every 100 females age 18 and over, there were 106.7 males.

The median income for a household in the township was $30,250, and the median income for a family was $36,625. Males had a median income of $27,841 versus $16,111 for females. The per capita income for the township was $14,337. About 9.9% of families and 11.2% of the population were below the poverty line, including 3.1% of those under age 18 and 19.0% of those age 65 or over.

== Education ==
Students in Ferguson Township are served by the Curwensville Area School District.

== See also ==
- Lumber City, Pennsylvania
