= Pike Township, Clearfield County, Pennsylvania =

Township in Pennsylvania, US

Coordinates: 41°00′30″N 78°29′55″W

- Township
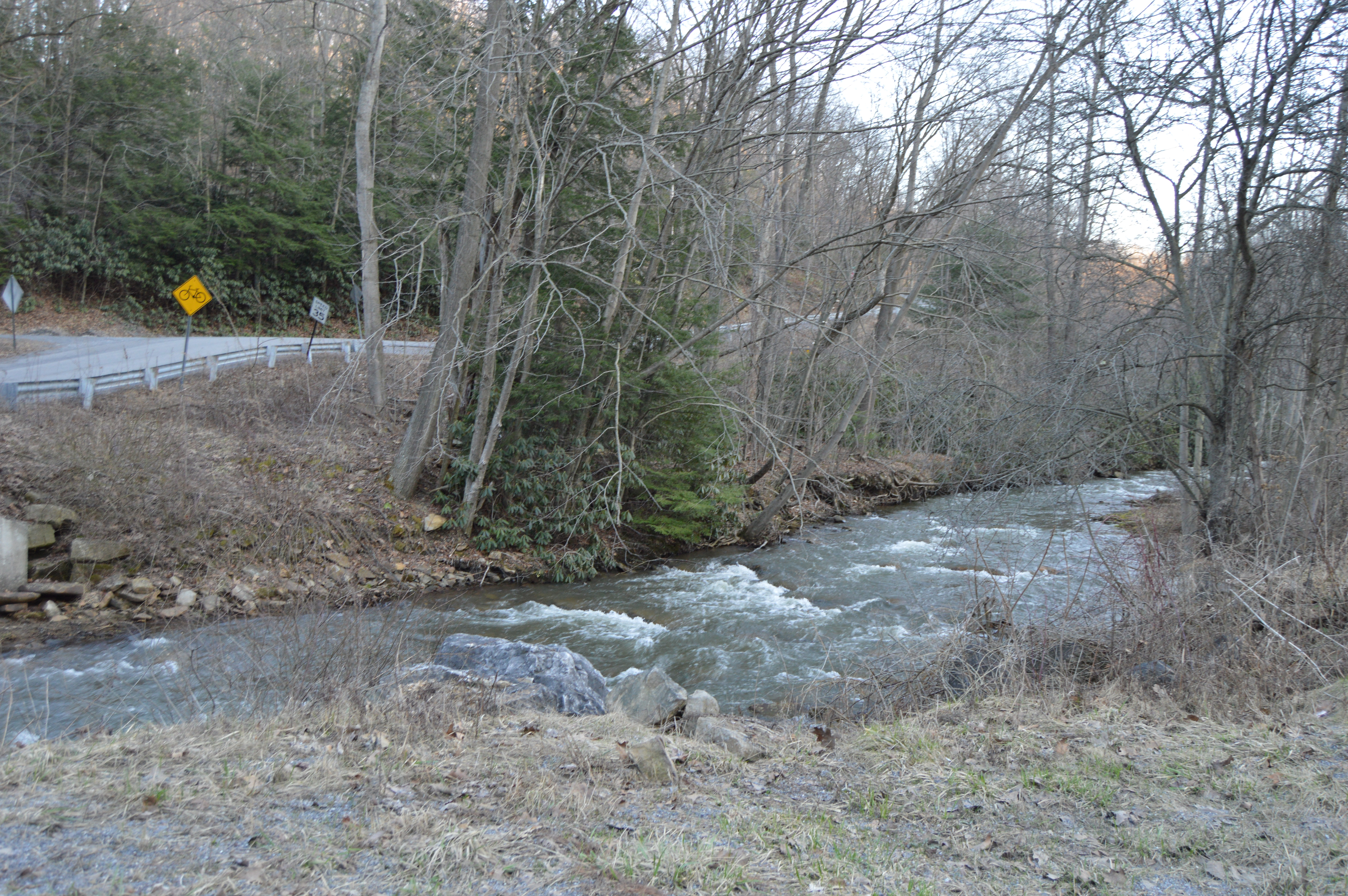
- Stream near Curwensville

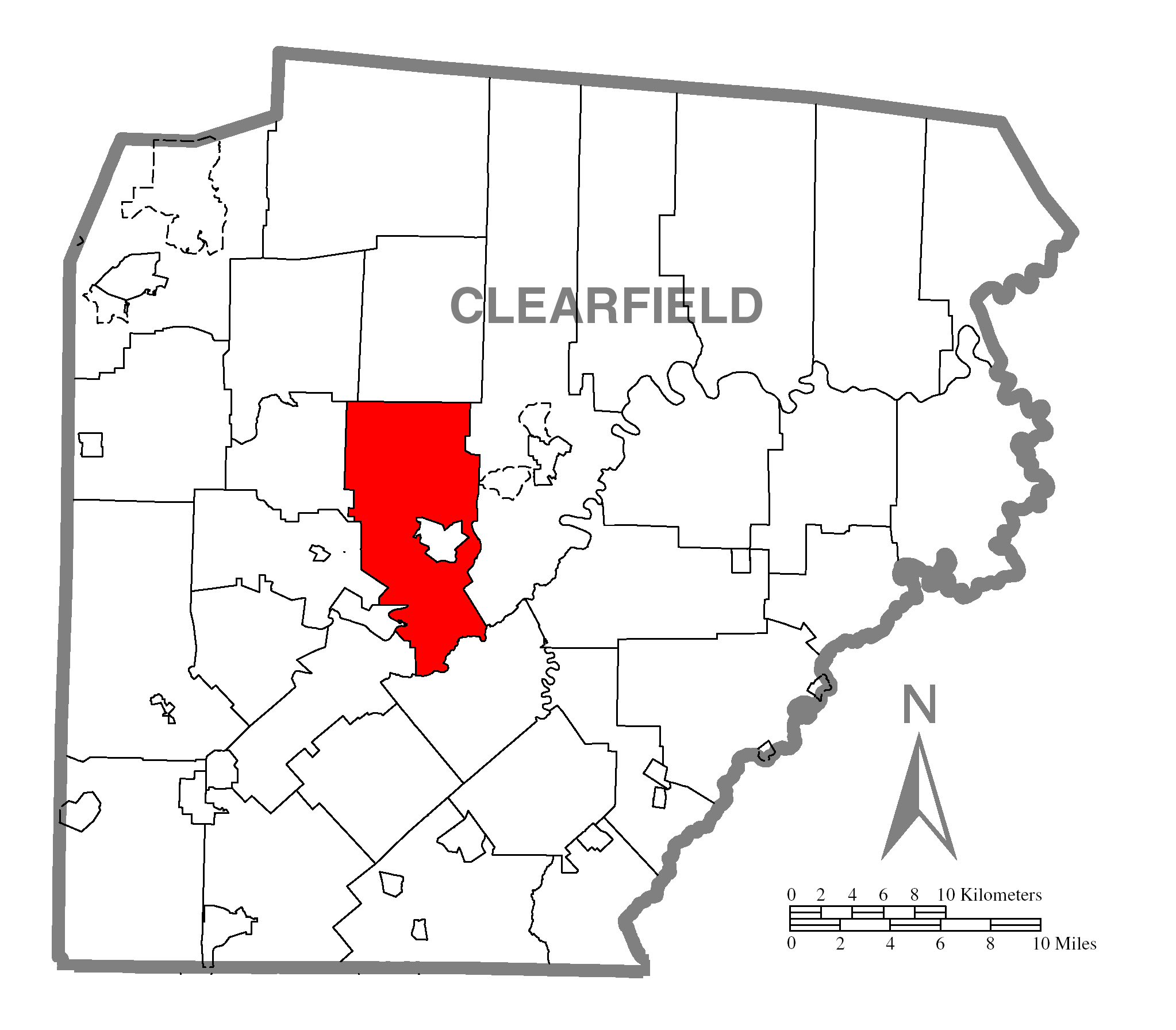
- Map of Clearfield County, Pennsylvania highlighting Pike Township

- Map of Clearfield County, Pennsylvania
- Country: United States
- State: Pennsylvania
- County: Clearfield
- Settled: 1797
- Incorporated: 1813

Area
  - Total: 42.76 sq mi (110.76 km^{2})
  - Land: 41.84 sq mi (108.36 km^{2})
  - Water: 0.93 sq mi (2.40 km^{2})

Population (2020)
  - Total: 2,308 ▼
  - Estimate (2021): 2,295
  - Density: 55/sq mi (21.3/km^{2})
- Time zone: UTC-5 (Eastern (EST))
  - Summer (DST): UTC-4 (EDT)
- Area code: 814
- FIPS code: 42-033-60192

Pike Township is a township that is located in Clearfield County, Pennsylvania, United States. The population was 2,308 at the time of the 2020 census.

== Geography ==
According to the United States Census Bureau, the township has a total area of 42.1 square miles (109.0 km^{2}), of which 40.7 square miles (105.4 km^{2}) is land and 1.4 square miles (3.6 km^{2}) (3.33%) is water.

== Communities ==
- Bloomington
- Bridgeport
- Olanta
- Curwensville

== Demographics ==
Historical population
Census	Pop.	Note	%±
2000	2,309		—
2010	2,311		0.1%
2020	2,308		−0.1%
2021 (est.)	2,295		−0.6%
U.S. Decennial Census

As of the census of 2000, there were 2,309 people, 856 households, and 677 families living in the township.

The population density was 56.7 inhabitants per square mile (21.9/km^{2}). There were 930 housing units at an average density of 22.9/sq mi (8.8/km^{2}).

The racial makeup of the township was 99.35% White, 0.04% African American, 0.17% Native American, 0.22% Asian, and 0.22% from two or more races. Hispanic or Latino of any race were 0.13% of the population.

There were 856 households, out of which 31.7% had children under the age of eighteen living with them; 67.3% were married couples living together, 7.4% had a female householder with no husband present, and 20.9% were non-families. 17.1% of all households were made up of individuals, and 7.9% had someone living alone who was sixty-five years of age or older.

The average household size was 2.66 and the average family size was 3.00.

Within the township, the population was spread out, with 23.3% of residents who were under the age of eighteen, 6.8% who were aged eighteen to twenty-four, 29.6% who were aged twenty-five to forty-four, 26.9% who were aged forty-five to sixty-four, and 13.4% who were sixty-five years of age or older. The median age was forty years.

For every one hundred females, there were 103.8 males. For every one hundred females who were aged eighteen or older, there were 103.0 males.

The median income for a household in the township was $37,321, and the median income for a family was $40,959. Males had a median income of $28,456 compared with that $20,142 for females.

The per capita income for the township was $15,670.

Approximately 6.7% of families and 9.0% of the population were living below the poverty line, including 11.2% of those who were under the age of eighteen and 3.9% of those aged sixty-five or older.

== Education ==
Local children attend the schools of the Curwensville Area School District.
