= Grampian, Pennsylvania =

Borough in Pennsylvania, US

- Borough
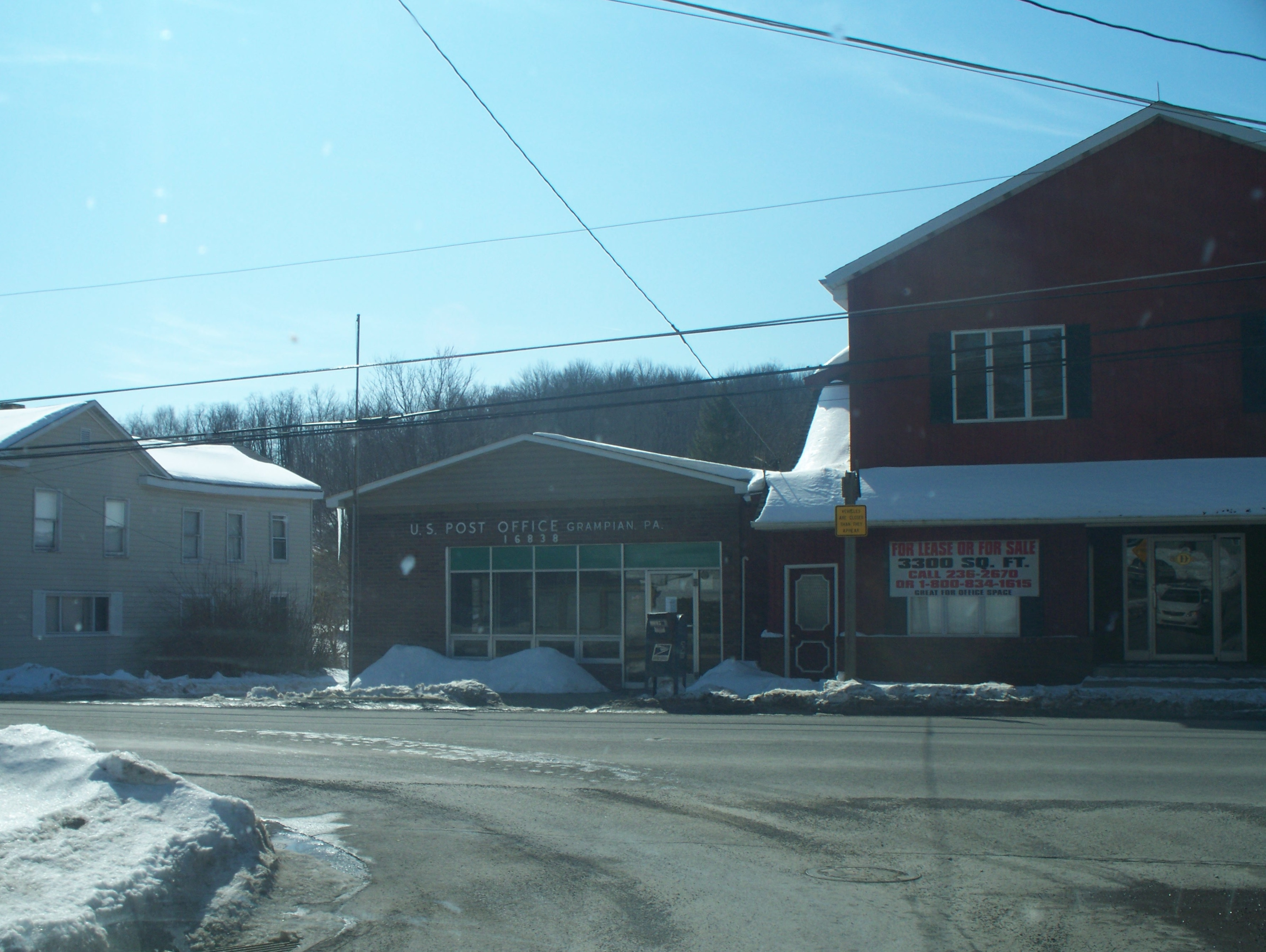
- The post office in Grampian

- Location of Grampian in Clearfield County, Pennsylvania.

- Map showing Clearfield County in Pennsylvania

- Pennsylvania
- Coordinates: 40°57′55″N 78°36′41″W
- Country: United States
- State: Pennsylvania
- County: Clearfield
- Settled: 1805
- Incorporated: 1885

Government
  - Type: Borough Council

Area
  - Total: 0.28 sq mi (0.73 km^{2})
  - Land: 0.28 sq mi (0.73 km^{2})
  - Water: 0 sq mi (0.00 km^{2})
- Elevation: 1,580 ft (480 m)

Population (2020)
  - Total: 361
  - Density: 1,281.6/sq mi (494.82/km^{2})
- Time zone: UTC-5 (Eastern (EST))
  - Summer (DST): UTC-4 (EDT)
- ZIP code: 16838
- Area code: 814
- FIPS code: 42-30280

Grampian is a borough in Clearfield County, Pennsylvania, United States. The population was 361 as of the 2020 census.

The community was named after the Grampian Mountains, in Scotland, the ancestral home of an early settler.

== Geography ==
Grampian is located in western Clearfield County at 40°57′55″N 78°36′41″W (40.965240, -78.611294). U.S. Route 219 passes through the borough, leading northwest 15 miles (24 km) to DuBois and southwest 11 miles (18 km) to Mahaffey. Pennsylvania Route 879 leads east 5 miles (8 km) to Curwensville and 12 miles (19 km) to Clearfield, the county seat.

According to the United States Census Bureau, the borough has a total area of 0.28 square miles (0.73 km^{2}), all land.

== Demographics ==
Historical population
Census	Pop.	Note	%±
1890	219		—
1900	600		174.0%
1910	666		11.0%
1920	677		1.7%
1930	533		−21.3%
1940	632		18.6%
1950	589		−6.8%
1960	529		−10.2%
1970	737		39.3%
1980	424		−42.5%
1990	415		−2.1%
2000	441		6.3%
2010	356		−19.3%
2020	361		1.4%

As of the census of 2000, there were 441 people, 166 households, and 119 families residing in the borough. The population density was 1,486 inhabitants per square mile (574/km^{2}). There were 177 housing units at an average density of 596.4 per square mile (230.3/km^{2}). The racial makeup of the borough was 99.77% White, 0.23% from other races. Hispanic or Latino of any race were 0.68% of the population.

Out of the total of 166 households, 42.2% had children under the age of 18 living with them, 56.6% were married couples living together, 10.8% had a female householder with no husband present, and 28.3% were non-families. 24.7% of all households were made up of individuals, and 10.8% had someone living alone who was 65 years of age or older. The average household size was 2.66 and the average family size was 3.14.

In the borough the population was spread out, with 31.3% under the age of 18, 7.5% from 18 to 24, 29.5% from 25 to 44, 17.5% from 45 to 64, and 14.3% who were 65 years of age or older. The median age was 31 years. For every 100 females there were 94.3 males. For every 100 females age 18 and over, there were 88.2 males.

The median income for a household in the borough was $29,271, and the median income for a family was $34,219. Males had a median income of $26,528 versus $20,179 for females. The per capita income for the borough was $12,127. About 6.2% of families and 8.4% of the population were below the poverty line, including 14.8% of those under age 18 and none of those aged 65 or over.

== Notable person ==
- Lloyd H. Wood, 20th Lieutenant Governor of Pennsylvania

== See also ==
- Western Pennsylvania
- Bilger's Rocks
