= Curwensville, Pennsylvania =

Borough in Pennsylvania, US

- Borough
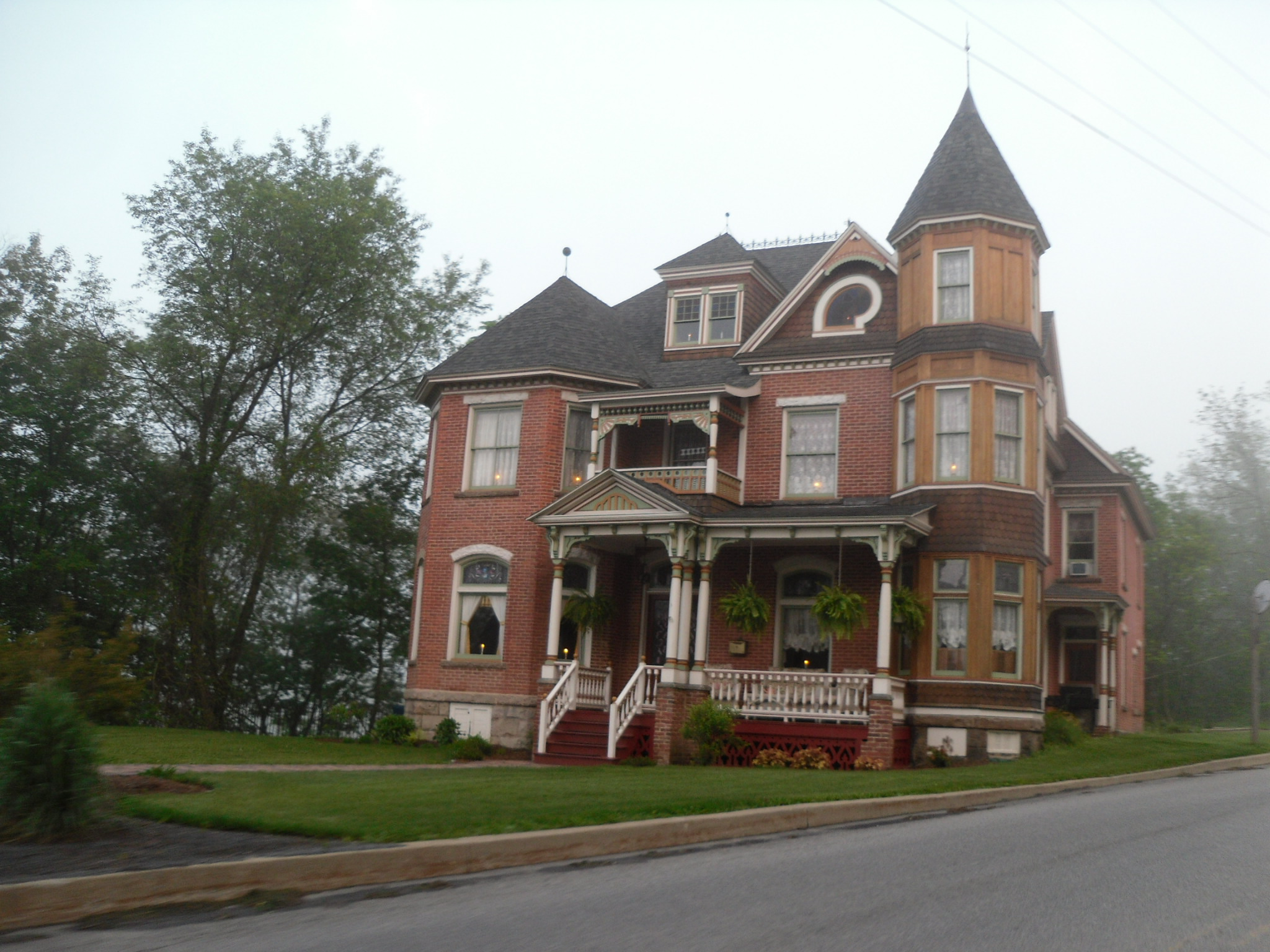

- Location of Curwensville in Clearfield County, Pennsylvania.

- Map showing Clearfield County in Pennsylvania

- Location in Pennsylvania
- Coordinates: 40.9743°N 78.52134°W
- Country: United States
- State: Pennsylvania
- County: Clearfield
- Settled: 1799
- Incorporated: 1851

Government
  - Type: Borough Council
  - Mayor: Jim Hoover

Area
  - Total: 2.33 sq mi (6.04 km^{2})
  - Land: 2.23 sq mi (5.77 km^{2})
  - Water: 0.10 sq mi (0.27 km^{2})
- Elevation: 1,161 ft (354 m)

Population (2020)
  - Total: 2,567
  - Density: 1,152.1/sq mi (444.84/km^{2})
- Time zone: UTC-5 (Eastern (EST))
  - Summer (DST): UTC-4 (EDT)
- ZIP code: 16833
- Area code: 814
- FIPS code: 42-17840
- Website: curwensvilleborough.com

Curwensville is a borough in Clearfield County, Pennsylvania, United States, 45 miles (72 km) north of Altoona on the West Branch Susquehanna River. Coal mining, tanning, and the manufacture of fire bricks were the industries at the turn of the 20th century. In 1900, 1,937 people lived in the borough, and in 1910, 2,549 lived there. As of the 2020 census, Curwensville had a population of 2,567. The population of the borough at its highest was 3,422 in 1940.

== History ==
Curwensville was named for John Curwen in 1799. Once the Borough was established and local government formed, many improvements were made to this country village, including sidewalks being laid on Filbert, Thompson, and Pine Streets in May 1855, the first bridge constructed in the borough in 1870, and in 1890 the first water system was established. The town began to do well financially because of the lumber trade along the West Branch of the Susquehanna River. The leather trade has been and continues to be a large industry in Curwensville, Wickett and Craig. The Clearfield Cheese Company has been producing high-quality cheese out of Curwensville, Pennsylvania since 1938. In 1956, a man named Arnold Nawrocki came up with the idea to invent a method for wrapping cheese slices in cellophane, which drastically increased their shelf life and changed the modern cheese industry. Curwensville became the second borough of Clearfield County in 1851.

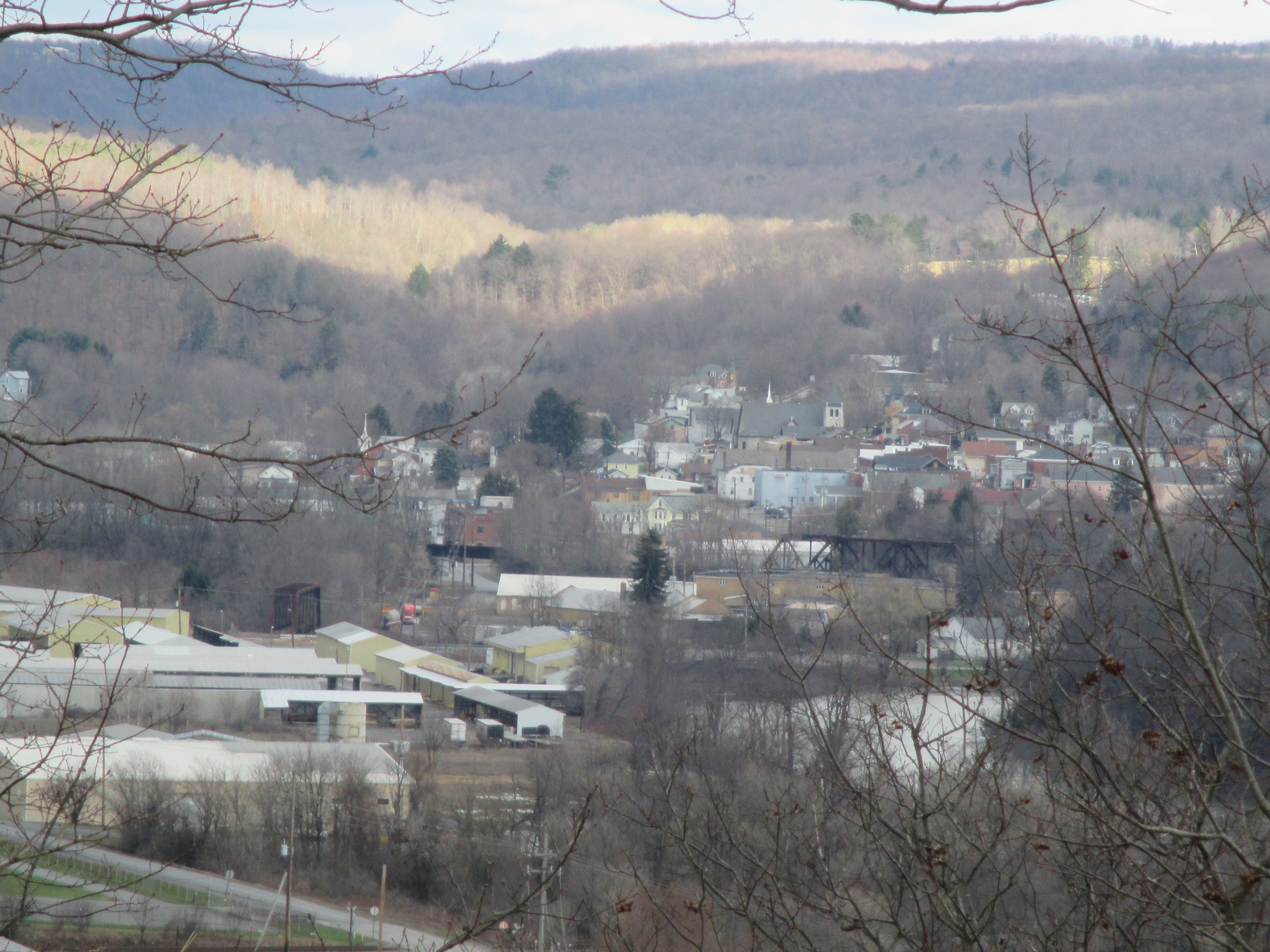
View of Curwensville looking northwest

=== Industry ===
North American Refractories Company (NARCO) was a brick plant in Curwensville. The "Brick Yard" as most called it in the community made many different types of brick. Seneca, acid, and cardic brick were all manufactured in NARCO. They were also noted for hot gun models and specialty shapes.

The sandstone quarry owned by Russell Stone Products, Inc. in Curwensville, PA, is a valued asset. Although the site had remained dormant for a lengthy period of time in the 1900s, today it is a viable source that has extensively supplied material for many prominent projects nationwide.

Lezzer Lumber founded in 1927, by Michael Lezzer and his cousins, Louie and Charlie Sandri. They specialized in building materials and farm equipment sales and repair. The company has been a source of lumber in the area since, though the original store burnt down in 1971. Lezzer Lumber has been expanding throughout Pennsylvania since, even opening a truss plant in 1999 to manufacture trusses to be shipped ready to install. Lezzer Lumber's main headquarters is still located in Curwensville.

== Geography ==
Curwensville is located near the center of Clearfield County at 40°58′24″N 78°31′20″W (40.973408, -78.522318), along the banks of the West Branch Susquehanna River. Curwensville Lake on the West Branch is impounded 2 miles (3 km) south of the borough and extends 6 miles (10 km) southwest to Lumber City. Pennsylvania Route 879 passes through Curwensville, leading northeast (downstream) 6 miles (10 km) to Clearfield, the county seat, and west 5 miles (8 km) to Grampian.

According to the United States Census Bureau, Curwensville has a total area of 2.33 square miles (6.04 km^{2}), of which 2.23 square miles (5.77 km^{2}) is land and 0.10 square miles (0.27 km^{2}), or 4.49%, is water.

== Demographics ==
Historical population
Census	Pop.	Note	%±
1860	455		—
1870	556		22.2%
1880	706		27.0%
1890	1,664		135.7%
1900	1,937		16.4%
1910	2,549		31.6%
1920	2,973		16.6%
1930	3,140		5.6%
1940	3,422		9.0%
1950	3,332		−2.6%
1960	3,231		−3.0%
1970	3,189		−1.3%
1980	3,116		−2.3%
1990	2,924		−6.2%
2000	2,650		−9.4%
2010	2,542		−4.1%
2020	2,567		1.0%
2021 (est.)	2,548	▼	−0.7%

As of the census of 2000, there were 2,650 people, 1,144 households, and 758 families residing in the borough. The population density was 1,178.4 inhabitants per square mile (455.0/km^{2}). There were 1,254 housing units at an average density of 557.7 per square mile (215.3/km^{2}). The ethnic composition of the borough was 99.02% White, 0.34% African American, 0.23% Native American, 0.08% Asian, 0.00% Pacific Islander, 0.04% from other races, and 0.30% from two or more races. 0.30% of the population were Hispanic or Latino of any race.

There were 1,144 households of which 28.9% had children under the age of 18 living with them, 50.2% were married couples living together, 11.2% had a female householder with no husband present, and 33.7% were not nuclear families. 30.6% of all households were made up of solitary dwellers of varying ages with 15.9% of those being a person who was 65 years of age or older. The average household size was 2.29 people and the average family size was 2.84 people.

The ages of persons living in the Curwensville borough were widely varied with 22.8% under the age of 18, 7.5% from 18 to 24, 26.6% from 25 to 44, 24.0% from 45 to 64, and 19.2% who were 65 years of age or older. The median age was 40 years. For every 100 females, there were 82.0 males. For every 100 females age 18 and over, there were 80.0 males.

The median income for a household in the borough was $27,281, and the median income for a family was $36,197. Males had a median income of $28,145 versus $18,598 for females. The per capita income for the borough was $14,829. 16.0% of the population and 12.8% of families were below the poverty line. Out of the total population, 29.0% of those under the age of 18 and 12.7% of those 65 and older were living below the poverty line.

== Notable people ==
- Edward A. Irvin (1838–1908), member of the Pennsylvania Senate
- Charles Emory Patton (1859–1937), Republican member of the U.S. House of Representatives from 1911 to 1915
- John Patton (January 6, 1823 – December 23, 1897) was a U.S. Representative from the U.S. state of Pennsylvania.
- John Patton Jr. (October 30, 1850 – May 24, 1907) was a U.S. Senator from the state of Michigan.
- Charles Wall (c. 1903–1995), resident superintendent of George Washington's estate at Mount Vernon for 39 years, starting in 1937.
