= Pennsylvania Route 879 =

State highway in Pennsylvania, US

Pennsylvania Route 879

Route information
- Maintained by PennDOT
- Length: 43.033 mi (69.255 km)
- Existed: May 27, 1935–present

Major junctions
- West end: US 219 / PA 729 in Grampian
- PA 453 in Curwensville; PA 153 in Clearfield; US 322 in Clearfield; I-80 in Lawrence Township; PA 970 in Goshen Township
- East end: PA 144 in Snow Shoe Township

Location
- Country: United States
- State: Pennsylvania
- Counties: Clearfield, Centre

Highway system
- Pennsylvania State Route System; Interstate; US; State; Scenic; Legislative
← PA 877	→ PA 880

Pennsylvania Route 879 (PA 879) is a 43-mile-long (69 km) state highway located in Clearfield and Centre counties in Pennsylvania. The western terminus is at U.S. Route 219 (US 219) and PA 729 in Grampian. The eastern terminus is at PA 144 in Snow Shoe Township.

== Route description ==
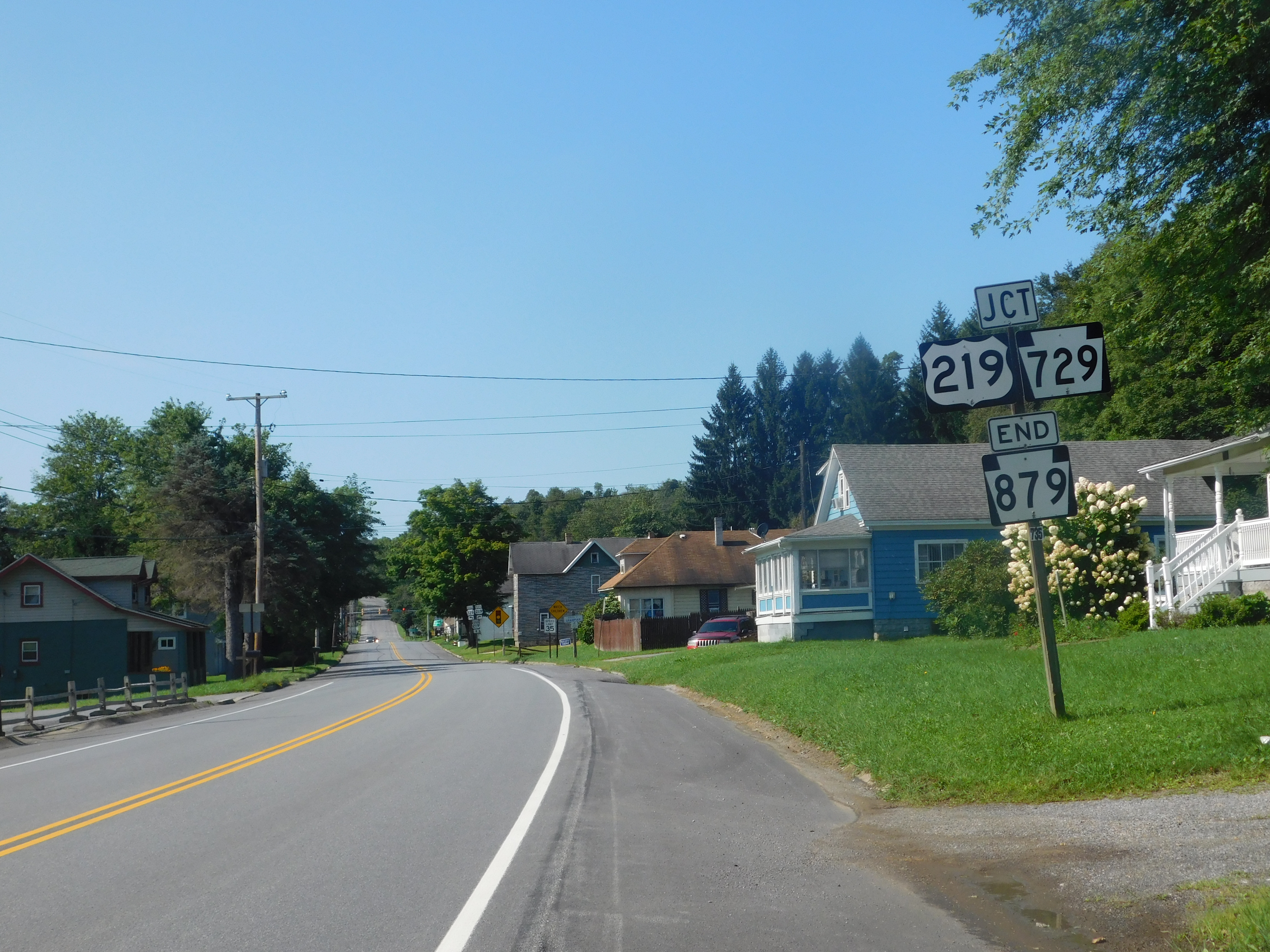
PA 879 westbound in Grampian

PA 879 begins at an intersection with US 219 and PA 729 in the borough of Grampian in Clearfield County, heading northeast on two-lane undivided 1st Street. The road passes homes, crossing into Penn Township and becoming Curwensville Grampian Highway. Here, the route passes through a mix of fields and woods with some residences, curving to the east. PA 879 heads into Pike Township and winds through more forested areas. The road turns to the northeast and crosses Anderson Creek, continuing along the north bank of the creek as it passes near industrial areas and heads into the borough of Curwensville. The route becomes State Street and turns southeast and heads through residential areas before heading into the commercial downtown and intersecting the northern terminus of PA 453. PA 879 heads through woods and crosses under a R.J. Corman Railroad line, continuing between the railroad line to the north and the West Branch Susquehanna River to the south. The road passes under another R.J. Corman Railroad line and heads through more wooded areas, crossing back into Pike Township and turning to the northeast as Clearfield Curwensville Highway. The route heads east-northeast through a mix of woodland and farmland, entering Lawrence Township. PA 879 gains a center left-turn lane and heads northeast through commercial areas, becoming two lanes again and crossing the West Branch Susquehanna River. The road heads through wooded areas of development along the east bank of the river, widening into a four-lane divided highway.

The route turns east onto two-lane divided limited-access Clearfield Shawville Highway and passes through wooded areas, skirting the southern border of the borough of Clearfield. PA 879 becomes undivided and turns to the northeast, passing through a section of Clearfield before heading back into Lawrence Township and coming to an interchange with PA 153, at which point it widens into a three-lane divided highway with two eastbound lanes and one westbound lane. The road briefly passes through Clearfield again before reentering Lawrence Township, becoming undivided again and curving to the north. The lane configuration changes to two westbound lanes and one eastbound lane as the route passes over Fire Tower Road and turns northeast again, coming to an interchange with US 322. Past this interchange, PA 879 crosses over a R.J. Corman Railroad line and the West Branch Susquehanna River, becoming a two-lane divided highway and passing through more wooded areas with some commercial establishments as a surface road. The median changes to a center left-turn lane as the road heads past more businesses and turns north to come to an interchange with Interstate 80 (I-80).

Past this interchange, the route becomes two-lane undivided Shawville Croft Highway and winds northeast into forested areas, resuming along the west bank of the West Branch Susquehanna River. PA 879 enters Goshen Township and continues through more rural areas alongside the river, turning east and coming to an intersection with the northern terminus of PA 970 in the community of Shawville. The road winds northeast through more forests with some fields and residences, curving east and passing through Croft. At this point, a R.J. Corman Railroad line runs in between the road and the river. The route turns southeast and heads into Girard Township near the community of Surveyor, becoming Shawville Frenchville Highway and running through more forests. PA 879 turns northeast away from the river and railroad line and continues through more rural areas with occasional homes, curving east and passing through Bald Hill. Farther east, the road turns north and east, heading into Covington Township. At this point, the route becomes Frenchville Karthaus Highway, heading into a mix of farmland and woodland with some homes and passing near Frenchville. PA 879 heads into more forested areas with some fields and residences, passing through an agricultural clearing before turning to the northeast. The road heads through more wooded areas and crosses into Karthaus Township. Here, the route turns southeast onto Market Street and runs through more woodland before passing east through the residential community of Karthaus. The road turns southeast into more wooded areas and crosses a R.J. Corman Railroad line.

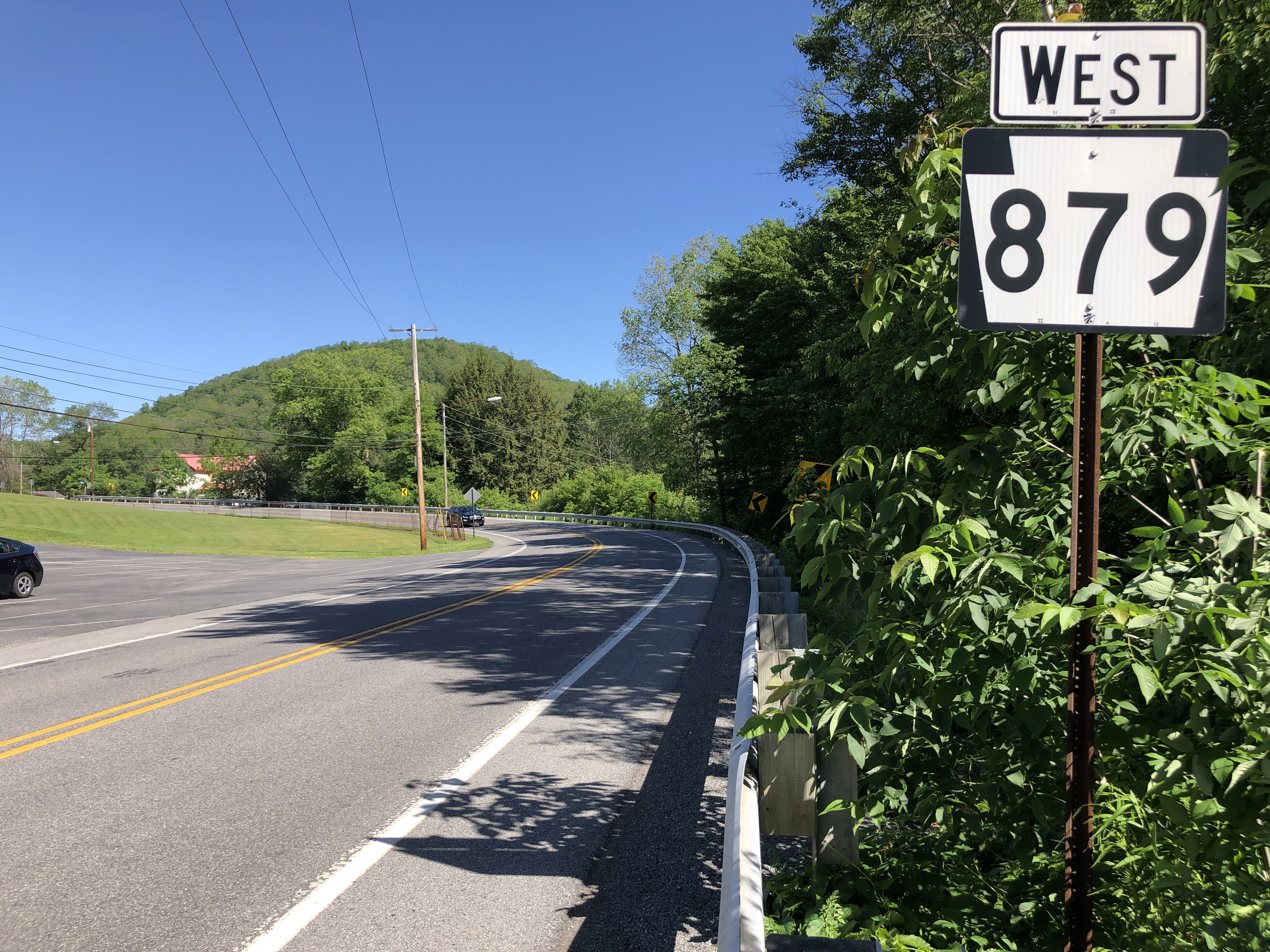
PA 879 westbound in Karthaus

PA 879 crosses the West Branch Susquehanna River into Burnside Township in Centre County and becomes Pine Glen Road, heading south and southeast through more forests. The road passes through an agricultural clearing before running through more forested areas with occasional homes and small fields. The route turns southeast and passes through the residential community of Pine Glen before passing through more forests with some residences and farmland. Farther southeast, PA 879 heads into Snow Shoe Township, reaching its eastern terminus at PA 144.

== Major intersections ==
County	Location	mi	km	Destinations	Notes
Clearfield	Grampian	0.000	0.000	US 219 / PA 729 south (1st Street/Main Street) – Ebensburg, Glen Hope, DuBois	Western terminus; northern terminus of PA 729
Clearfield	Curwensville	5.278	8.494	PA 453 south (Filbert Street) – Madera, Tyrone	Northern terminus of PA 453
Clearfield	Lawrence Township	11.041– 11.113	17.769– 17.885	PA 153 (Park Avenue Extension) – Clearfield, Houtzdale	Interchange
Clearfield	Lawrence Township	12.460– 12.758	20.052– 20.532	US 322 (Bigler Avenue/Daisy Street) – Clearfield, Philipsburg	Interchange
Clearfield	Lawrence Township	14.099– 14.187	22.690– 22.832	I-80 – DuBois, Bellefonte	I-80 exit 120
Clearfield	Goshen Township	17.765	28.590	PA 970 south (Shawville Highway) to I-80 – Woodland	Northern terminus of PA 970
Centre	Snow Shoe Township	43.033	69.255	PA 144 (Spruce Road) – Renovo, Moshannon	Eastern terminus
1.000 mi = 1.609 km; 1.000 km = 0.621 mi
