= French language in the United States =

United States French
- US French
- Français des États-Unis
- Native to: United States
- Region: Louisiana; New England
- Language family: Indo-European: Italic; Romance; Western; Gallo-Romance; Oïl; French; United States French
- Early forms: Old Latin: Classical Latin; Vulgar Latin; Old French; Middle French
- Dialects: Missouri; Louisianien; Frenchville
- Writing system: Latin (French alphabet); French Braille

Language codes
- ISO 639-3: –
- Glottolog: None

The French language is spoken as a minority language in the United States. Roughly 1.18 million Americans over the age of five reported speaking the language at home in the federal 2020 American Community Survey, making French the seventh most spoken language in the country after English, Spanish (the most spoken Romance language, and French is second), Chinese, Tagalog, Vietnamese, and Arabic. Several varieties of French evolved in what is now the United States:

- Acadian French, spoken in Northern Maine by descendants of colonists in Acadia
- Louisiana French, spoken in Louisiana by descendants of colonists in French Louisiana
- New England French, spoken in New England by descendants of 19th and 20th-century Canadian migrants
- Missouri French, spoken in Missouri by descendants of French settlers in the Illinois Country
- Muskrat French, spoken in Michigan by descendants of habitants, voyageurs and coureurs des bois in the Pays d'en Haut
- Métis French, spoken in North Dakota by Métis people

More recently, French has also been carried to various parts of the country via immigration from Francophone countries and regions. Today, French is the second most spoken language (after English) in the states of Maine and Vermont. French is the third most spoken language (after English and Spanish) in the states of Louisiana, Connecticut and Rhode Island.

As a second language, French is the second most widely taught foreign language (after Spanish) in American schools, colleges and universities. While the overwhelming majority of Americans of French ancestry grew up speaking only English, some enroll their children in French heritage language classes.

== Dialects and varieties ==
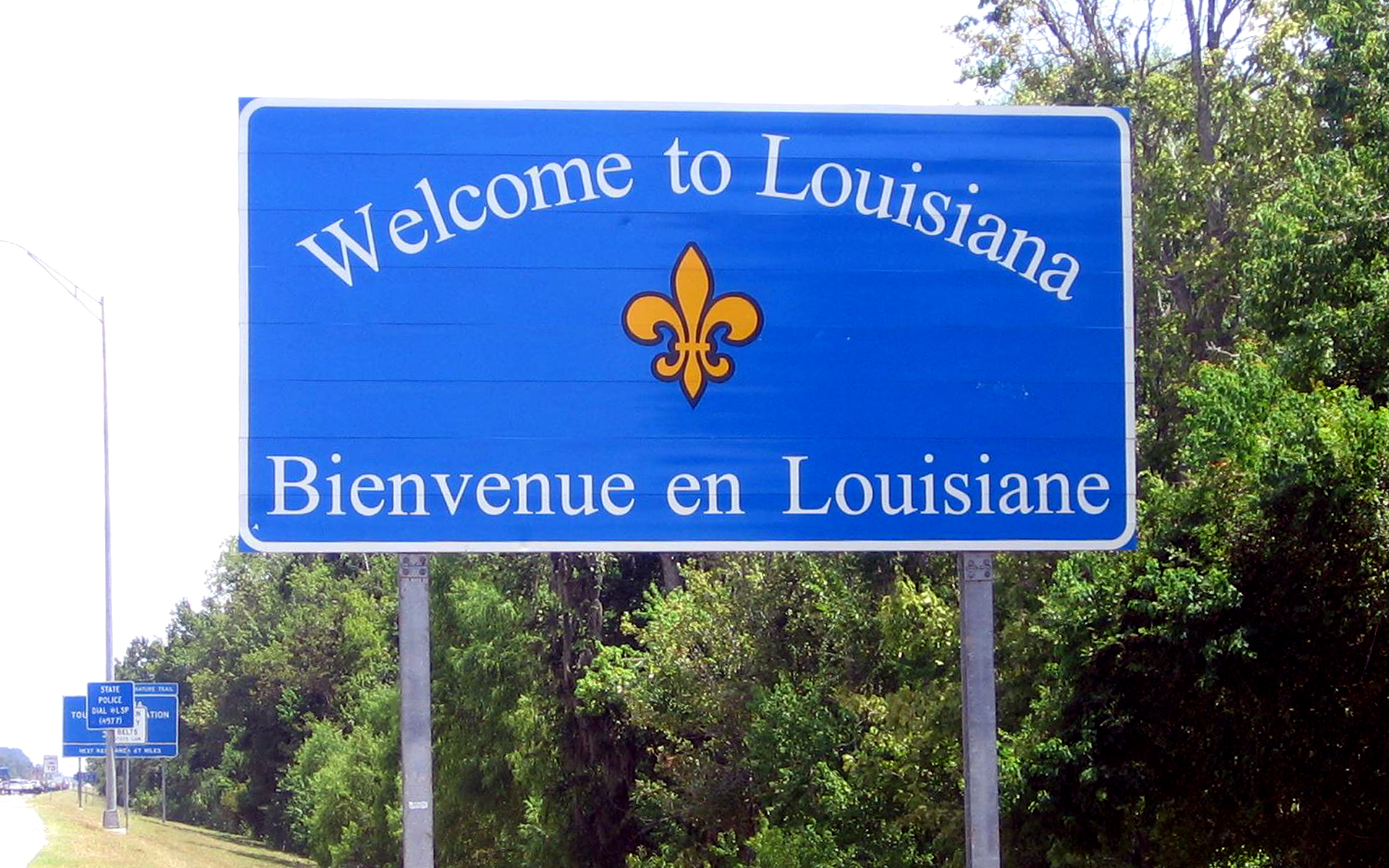
Bilingual road sign in Louisiana

There are three major groups of French dialects that emerged in what is now the United States: Louisiana French, Missouri French, and New England French (essentially a variant of Canadian French).

Louisiana French is traditionally divided into three dialects, Colonial French, Louisiana Creole French, and Cajun French. Colonial French is traditionally said to have been the form of French spoken in the early days of settlement in the lower Mississippi River valley, and was once the language of the educated land-owning classes. Cajun French, derived from Acadian French, is said to have been introduced with the arrival of Acadian exiles in the 18th century. The Acadians, the francophone inhabitants of Acadia (modern Nova Scotia, New Brunswick, Prince Edward Island, and northern Maine), were expelled from their homeland between 1755 and 1763 by the British. Many Acadians settled in lower Louisiana, where they became known as Cajuns (a corruption of "Acadians"). Their dialect was regarded as the typical language of white lower classes, while Louisiana Creole French developed as the language of the black community. Today, most linguists regard Colonial French to have largely merged with Cajun, while Louisiana Creole remains a distinct variety.

Missouri French was spoken by the descendants of 17th-century French settlers in the Illinois Country, especially in the area of Ste. Genevieve, St. Louis, and in Washington County. In the 1930s there were said to be about 600 French-speaking families in the Old Mines region between De Soto and Potosi. By the late 20th century the dialect was nearly extinct, with only a few elderly speakers able to use it. Similarly, Muskrat French is spoken in southeastern Michigan by descendants of habitants, voyageurs and coureurs des bois who settled in the Pays d'en Haut.

New England French, essentially a local variety of Canadian French, is spoken in parts of the New England states. This area has a legacy of significant immigration from Canada, especially during the 19th and the early 20th centuries. Some Americans of French heritage who have lost the language are currently attempting to revive it. Acadian French is also spoken by Acadians in Maine in the Saint John Valley.

Métis French is spoken by some Métis people in North Dakota.

Ernest F. Haden identifies the French of Frenchville, Pennsylvania as a distinct dialect of North American French. "While the French enclave of Frenchville, Pennsylvania first received attention in the late 1960s, the variety of French spoken has not been the subject of systematic linguistic study. Haden reports that the geographical origin of its settlers is central France, as was also the case of New Orleans, but with settlement being more recent (1830–1840). He also reports that in the 1960s French seemed to be on the verge of extinction in the state community."

Brayon French is spoken in the Beauce of Quebec; Edmundston, New Brunswick; and Madawaska, Maine mostly in Aroostook County, Maine. Although superficially a phonological descendant of Acadian French, analysis reveals it is morphosyntactically identical to Quebec French. It is believed to have resulted from a localized levelling of contact dialects between Québécois and Acadian settlers. Some of the Brayons view themselves as neither Acadian nor Québécois, affirming that they are a distinctive culture with a history and heritage linked to farming and forestry in the Madawaska area.

Canadian French spoken by French Canadian immigrants is also spoken by Canadian Americans and French Canadian Americans in the United States across Little Canadas and in many cities of New England. French Canadians living in Canada express their cultural identity using a number of terms. The Ethnic Diversity Survey of the 2006 Canadian census found that French-speaking Canadians identified their ethnicity most often as French, French Canadians, Québécois, and Acadian. The latter three were grouped together by Jantzen (2006) as "French New World" ancestries because they originate in Canada. All these ancestries are represented among French Canadian Americans. Franco-Newfoundlanders speaking Newfoundland French, Franco-Ontarians, Franco-Manitobans, Fransaskois, Franco-Albertans, Franco-Columbians, Franco-Ténois, Franco-Yukonnais, Franco-Nunavois are part of the French Canadian American population and speak their own form of French.

Various dialects of French spoken in France are also spoken in the United States by recent immigrants from France, by people of French ancestry and descendants of immigrants from France.

== Native speaker populations ==
=== French ancestry ===
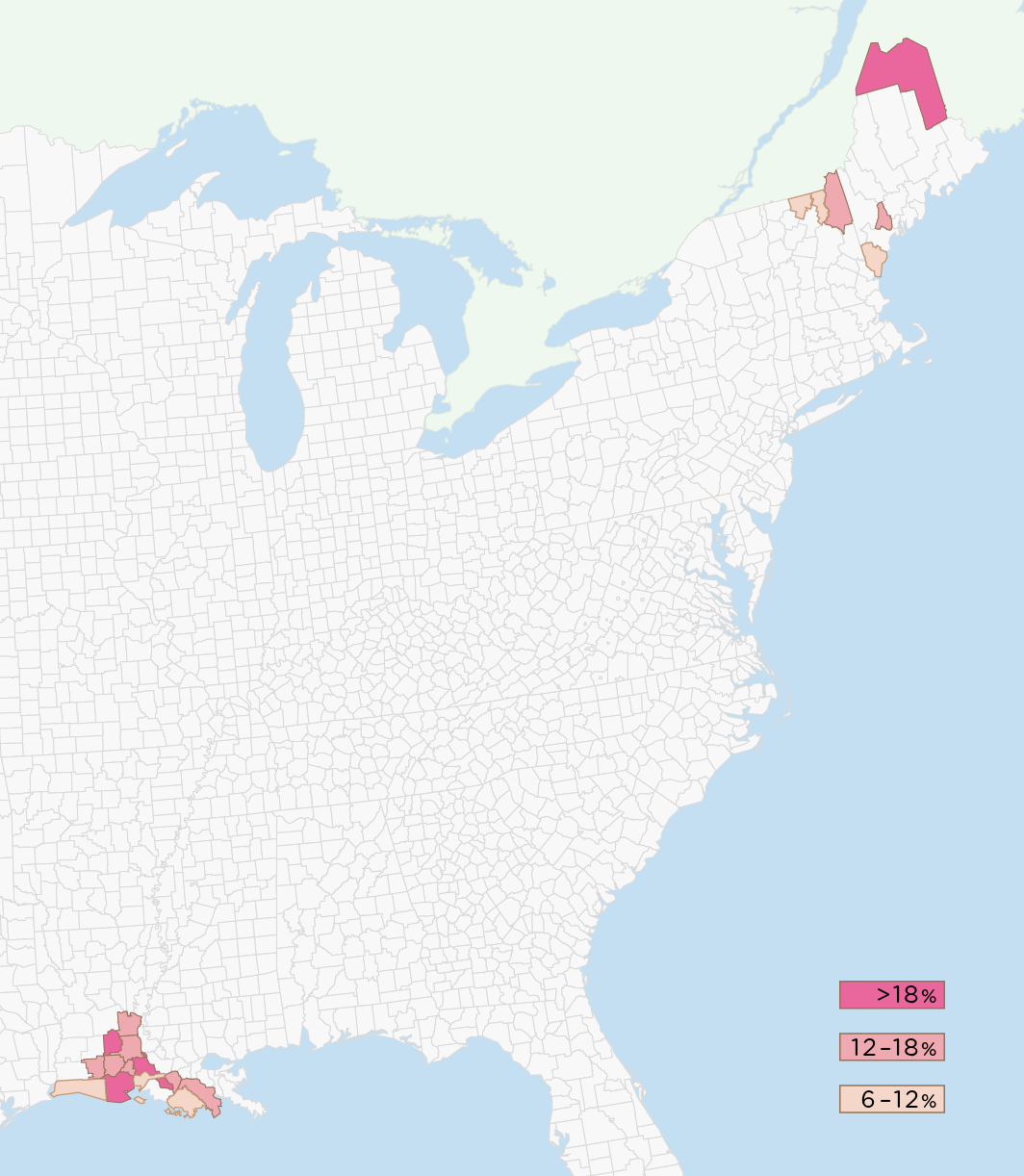
Map of Francophone speakers in the United States.

A total of 10,804,304 people claimed French ancestry in the 2010 census although other sources have recorded as many as 13 million people claiming this ancestry. Most French-speaking Americans are of this heritage, but there are also significant populations not of French descent who speak it as well, including those from Belgium, Switzerland, Haiti and numerous Francophone African countries.

=== Newer Francophone immigrants ===
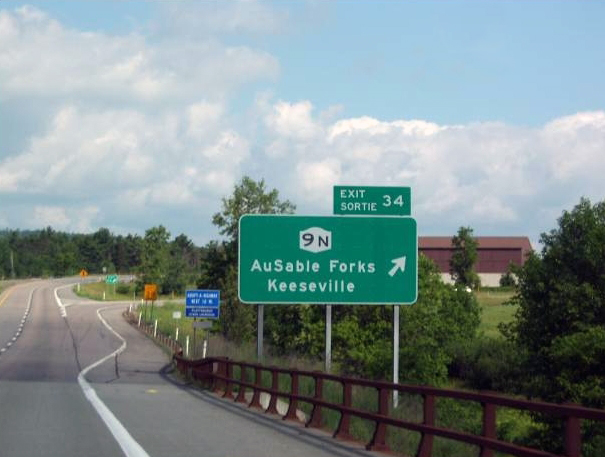
Bilingual exit sign on Interstate 87 in Clinton County, New York, near the U.S.-Canada border with Quebec

In Florida, the city of Miami is home to a large Francophone community, consisting of French expatriates, Haitians (who may also speak Haitian Creole, a separate language which is derived partially from French), and French Canadians; there is also a growing community of Francophone Africans in and around Orlando and Tampa. A small but sustaining French community that originated in San Francisco during the Gold Rush and was supplemented by French wine-making immigrants to the Bay Area is centered culturally around that city's French Quarter.

In Maine, there is a recent increase of French speakers due to immigration from Francophone countries in Africa.

=== Francophone tourists and retirees ===
Many retired individuals from Quebec have moved to Florida, or at least spend the winter there. Also, the many Canadians who travel to the Southeastern states in the winter and spring include a number of Francophones, mostly from Quebec but also from New Brunswick and Ontario. Quebecers and Acadians also tend to visit Louisiana, as Quebec and New Brunswick share a number of cultural ties with Louisiana.

=== Seasonal migrations ===
Florida, California, New York, Texas, Louisiana, Arizona, Hawaii, and a few other popular resort regions (most notably Old Orchard Beach, Maine, Kennebunk and Kennebunkport, Maine and Cape May, New Jersey) are visited in large numbers by Québécois, during winter and summer vacations.

== Language study ==
French has traditionally been the foreign language of choice for English-speakers across the globe. However, after 1968, French has ranked as the second-most-studied foreign language in the United States, behind Spanish. Some 1.2 million students from the elementary grades through high school were enrolled in French language courses in 2007–2008, or 14% of all students enrolled in foreign languages.

Many American universities offer French-language courses, and degree programs in the language are common. In the fall of 2021, 135,088 American university students were enrolled in French courses, or 11.4% of all foreign-language students and the second-highest total of any language (behind Spanish, with 584,453 students, or 49.4%).

Traditionally, French teaching has been more important in private schools, but it is difficult to obtain accurate data because of the optional requirements of languages in these schools. Indeed, the study of a foreign language is not required of American students in all states. Some states, however, including New York, Virginia and Georgia, require a minimum of two years of foreign-language instruction.

== Local communities ==
Francophone communities in the United States
Town/county/parish		Population		
State		Total	Francophone	
			%	
Towns with more than 1,000 inhabitants
Madawaska	ME	4,534	84%	3,809
Frenchville	ME	1,225	80%	980
Van Buren	ME	2,631	79%	2,078
Berlin	NH	10,051	65%	6,533
Fort Kent	ME	4,233	61%	2,582
Towns with fewer than 1,000 inhabitants
St. Agatha	ME	802	80%	642
Grand Isle	ME	518	76%	394
St. Francis	ME	577	61%	352
St. John Plantation	ME	282	60%	169
Hamlin	ME	257	57%	146
Eagle Lake	ME	815	50%	408
Counties/parishes with highest francophone percentage (not counting French-based creole speakers)
St. Martin Parish	LA	48,583	27.4%	13,312
Evangeline Parish	LA	35,434	25.7%	9,107
Vermilion Parish	LA	53,807	24.9%	13,398
Aroostook County	ME	73,938	22.4%	16,562
Lafourche Parish	LA	89,974	19.1%	17,185
Acadia Parish	LA	58,861	19%	11,184
Avoyelles Parish	LA	41,481	17.6%	7,301
Assumption Parish	LA	23,388	17.6%	4,116
St. Landry Parish	LA	87,700	16.7%	14,646
Coös County	NH	33,111	16.2%	5,364
Jefferson Davis Parish	LA	31,435	16.2%	5,092
Lafayette Parish	LA	190,503	14.4%	27,432
Androscoggin County	ME	103,793	14.3%	14,842

== Media and education ==
=== Cultural and language governmental bodies ===
- Council for the Development of French in Louisiana (CODOFIL)
- Massachusetts American and French Canadian Cultural Exchange Commission

=== Television channels ===
- 3ABN Français, Christian television network 24/7 in French.
- Bonjour Television, the first American television station broadcasting 24/7 totally in French.
- TV5Monde
- Louisiana Public Broadcasting daily afternoon and weekend morning broadcast of French language programs aimed at children on LPB 2
- Canal+ International

=== Newspapers ===
- France-Amérique
- List of French-language newspapers published in the United States

=== Radio stations ===
- WSRF (AM 1580), Miami area
- WYGG (FM 88.1), central New Jersey
- KFAI (FM 90.3 Minneapolis and 106.7 St.Paul), Minnesota (weekly broadcast is French with English translation, but features French-language music)
- KBON (FM 101.1), southern Louisiana (spoken programming is English, but features French-language music)
- KLCL (AM 1470), southern Louisiana (spoken programming is English, but features French-language music)
- KVPI (1050 AM), southern Louisiana (twice-a-day news broadcast in French, plays English-language music)
- KRVS (FM 88.7), southern Louisiana (variety of programming in English and French)
- WFEA (AM 1370) Manchester, New Hampshire (Sunday morning broadcast in French. Chez Nous with Roger Lacerte)
- WNRI (AM 1380 and FM 95.1) Woonsocket, Rhode Island (Saturday midday, and Sunday afternoon broadcasts of L'Écho Musical with Roger and Claudette Laliberté)

=== Multimedia Platforms ===
- Télé-Louisiane: Multimedia platform dedicated to the languages and culture of Louisiana.
- New Niveau

=== French language schools ===
- North Seattle French School
- Audubon Charter School, New Orleans
- Dallas International School
- École Bilingue de Berkeley
- École Bilingue de La Nouvelle-Orléans
- Ecole Kenwood French Immersion School, Columbus, Ohio
- San Diego French-American School
- École secondaire Saint-Dominique, Auburn, Maine
- Awty International School, Houston, Texas
- Lycée International de Houston
- Francophone Charter School of Oakland
- French Academy of Bilingual Culture, New Milford, New Jersey
- Lycée Français de New York
- Lycée Français de Los Angeles
- Lycée Français de Chicago
- Lycée Français de la Nouvelle-Orléans
- Lycée Français de San Francisco
- Lycée International de Los Angeles
- French American International School, San Francisco
- French American School of Arizona, Tempe, Arizona
- French-American School of New York
- French American School of Rhode Island, Providence
- International School of Arizona, Scottsdale, Arizona
- International School of Boston
- International School of Denver
- International School of Indiana
- International School of Tucson
- International School of Louisiana (ISL)
- The Language Academy, San Diego
- French International School of Philadelphia
- L'École Française du Maine
- L'Étoile du Nord French Immersion, St. Paul, Minnesota
- French American School of Puget Sound, Mercer Island, Washington
- French Immersion School of Washington
- École Franco-américaine de la Silicon Valley
- French American International School (Portland, Oregon)
- Portland French School, Portland, Oregon
- École Bilingue de Berkeley, Berkeley, California
- John Hanson French Immersion School, Oxon Hill, Maryland
- Robert Goddard French Immersion School, Lanham, Maryland
- The Waring School, French Immersion School, Beverly, Massachusetts
- École Internationale de Boston / International School of Boston, Cambridge and Arlington, Massachusetts
- Normandale French Immersion Elementary School, Edina, Minnesota
- St. Louis Language Immersion Schools, Saint Louis, Missouri
- École Française Bilingue de Greenville, South Carolina
- Lycée Rochambeau, Washington, D.C.
- Académie Lafayette – French Immersion Charter Public School, Kansas City, Missouri
- Santa Rosa French-American Charter School, Santa Rosa, California

== See also ==
- French America
- French Americans
- Quebec
- New Brunswick
- Louisiana
- French Creole
- Quebec French
- Acadian French
- Louisiana French
- Frenchville French
- Louisiana Creole
- Missouri French
- Muskrat French
- New England French
- Canadian French
- Newfoundland French
- French language in Canada
- American French
- Francophonie in Minnesota
- Council for the Development of French in Louisiana
- French colonization of the Americas
