= Air Mail scandal accidents and incidents =

Aspect of aviation history

In 1934, all United States commercial air mail carrying contracts were cancelled due to controversy over how the contracts had been awarded. The United States Army Air Corps was charged with carrying air mail service, beginning 19 February 1934. Due in part to extremely bad weather, inadequate preparation of the mail pilots, and the inadequacies of pressing military aircraft into duties for which they were not designed, there ensued a series of accidents over the following three months, ending when commercial services were restored. In all, 66 major accidents, ten of them with fatalities, resulted in 13 crew deaths, creating intense public furor. Only five of the 13 deaths actually occurred on flights carrying mail, but directly and indirectly the air mail operation caused accidental crash deaths in the Air Corps to rise by 15 percent to 54 in 1934, compared to 46 in 1933 and 47 in 1935.

The press dubbed this the Air Mail scandal, or the Air Mail fiasco.

This is a list of documented accidents and incidents involving Army Air Corps aircraft during that three-month period of 1934.

== Accidents and incidents ==
=== February ===
16 February
Crash of Curtiss A-12 Shrike, 33-244, in bad weather at Oakley, Utah, kills two crew, 2d Lt. Jean Donant Grenier, from Fort Crockett, Texas, and crewmate 2d Lt. Edwin D. White Jr., 23, attached to March Field, California, while flying an advance route to determine time and distance for carrying the mail between Salt Lake City and Cheyenne, Wyoming. Their plane came down in a canyon during a snowstorm. "The plane flown by the two men crashed in a blinding snow storm 60 miles east of Salt Lake in Summit county, 30 miles south of the Utah-Wyoming line." Orson Maxwell, a miner, found the crew dead in their cockpits shortly after 1700 hrs., near the head of the Weber River. They had departed the Salt Lake City airdrome at 0930 and army officers became concerned when their arrival at Cheyenne had not been reported by afternoon.

The first word of their fate was phoned to Salt Lake City by Orson Maxwell, miner, who drove in a sleigh from the scene of the crash to Oakley, several miles distant. The call was received here [March Field] about two hours after Maxwell discovered the bodies in the wrecked craft.

"Search had already started for them when a telephone call form [sic] Kamas, Utah last night told of their fate." "Lieutenant White was a San Francisco resident and a University of California graduate." He entered the army flying service in 1931. He was trained at Randolph and Kelly fields. [sic] Lieutenant Grenier, who was reported to have been piloting the plane, was a resident of Manchester, New Hampshire, and a graduate of the University of New Hampshire." Grenier Army Air Field, Massachusetts, later Grenier Air Force Base, is named in Lt. Grenier's honor on 22 February 1942.
16 February
While on a familiarization flight for impending flights of the U.S. Mail, 2d Lt. James Young Eastham (also reported as James Y. Eastman), "23, of the army air corps reserves," is killed in the crash of Douglas Y1B-7, 32-309, in fog at night near Jerome, Idaho.

Second Lieutenant James Y. Eastman, seventh bombardment group, March field [sic], was burned to death here last night when the twin engined Douglas bomber he was flying from Salt Lake City to Seattle in preparation to the war department carrying the mail, crashed and burned. It was misty at the time of the crash and witnesses said the plane was flying low just before the crash. According to Mrs. Clarence Wilson, eyewitness, the plane came skimming in low over the trees, its motor roaring. It passed over the house, she said, then suddenly crashed into the ground about one hundred feet beyond, bursting into flame. Mrs. Wilson immediately ran into the house and called the sheriff at Jerome, six miles from the scene. The Jerome fire department was rushed to the place. Eastman's body was dragged from the still burning plane and taken to the Jerome motuary [sic]. The victim was unmarried. His father is H. G. Eastman, who resides in Huntsville, Texas.

16 February

Another army pilot on an experimental flight made a forced landing near Linden, New Jersey, when he ran out of fuel.

LINDEN, N.J., Feb. 17. – (UP) – Lieutenant Joseph W. Kelly, army pilot scheduled to fly the mails, escaped injury last night when he ran out of fuel and made a forced landing in a wooded section. Kelly was making an experimental flight from Columbus, Ohio, to Newark, New Jersey.

19 February

An hour and a half after leaving Atlanta with the army's first airmail plane, Lieut. E. T. Gorman, of Mitchell [sic] Field crashed at the Greenville (S.C.) airport last night after attempting five landings. He was not hurt. Circling the field in an effort accurately to read the wind sock, Gorman came in down wind at too rapid speed and overran the apron. His plane struck a two-foot hedge at the end of the field and nosed over, bending the propeller and washing out one wheel of the undercarriage. The mail was transferred to the northbound Birmingham Special leaving here at 10:20 and consigned to Charlotte, where it was to be picked up by a plane sent down from Richmond and flown to Newark, N. J. Gorman arrived over the field at 9:35. It took him 10 minutes to land. After skimming over the field, he crashed into the hedge and left one wheel in a cotton field that bounds the airport on the southwest. The pilot took off from Atlanta with the first army mail plane to leave that city at 8:15, Eastern Standard time, with an 'average' load of mail. The takeoff was delayed 35 minutes awaiting a mail ship from New Orleans. The weather was clear and cold throughout his flight northward. The plane was due in Greenville at 9:15 but was late because of the delayed start. The schedule calls for northbound army mail planes to arrive at 9:15 p. m., and southbound ships at 5:15 a. m. Observation planes are being used.

19 February

MANSFIELD, O., Feb 19. – (UP) – An army biplane lay in a mass of wreckage on a farm near here today as a result of the first air mishap in Ohio as the army prepared to take over operation of the airmail service. Lost in a snowstorm while en route to take up his new assignment at Columbus, the pilot, Lieut, J. H. Gibson, was forced to 'bail out' when his gasoline supply ran low. He landed safely a mile and a half from the spot where his plane crashed.

20 February
Lieutenant John C. Crosthwaite, on the first U.S. Army airmail flight between San Francisco and Salt Lake City, is forced down by a local storm at Sacramento, California. The next flight is cancelled. "The plane carrying the southern mail to Newark got as far as Washington at 2:40 a. m., where it was grounded by bad weather."

22 February
Lieutenant Durwood O. Lowry, of the 17th Pursuit Squadron, 1st Pursuit Group, is killed in the crash of an Air Corps Curtiss O-39 Falcon, 32-216, whilst carrying the U.S. Mail, near Deshler, Ohio. His mother, Mrs. Dorothy Lowry Reisdorf, of Detroit, was quoted by the Associated Press, stating, "Good as they are, these Selfridge Field fliers shouldn't have to fly at night through winter storms over unfamiliar courses that it took months for commercial pilots to learn." Lowry's plane, carrying a capacity load (358 pounds of mail) on the Chicago-Toledo route, came down far off its course, in a snowstorm. The observation plane nose-dived into some woods, but Lowry managed to "throw some of his mail free before the crash." His plane was demolished and the mail bags were scattered for some distance behind the place at which the wrecked machine came to rest.

Lowry's body was torn to bits. He apparently had attempted to bail out, but a knot in the parachute cord is believed to have caught in a part of the plane and trapped him. Marks in the woods showed that the plane struck the ground, went forward some distance due to its momentum, and then nosed into the bank of a creek in the woods. The plane was demolished. Residents of the vicinity said Lowry apparently had trouble with his motor and had circled in a search for a landing place. Charles G. Thurston said he heard the plane pass over his farm home shortly before 6 a.m. (E. S. T.) Then he heard the motor being cut off. He said he opened a window and then heard the crash. Thurston telephoned to the Napoleon airport and then went out and found the body and the wreckage. Cutting off the ignition probably saved the wreckage from being destroyed by flames. Guarding the mail to the last, Lowry threw several sacks from the plane before the crash and it was believed all of the mail was recovered. Coroner Guy G. Boyer of Henry county, [sic] was expected to have the body removed to Napoleon.

Failure of a wireless set to function properly contributed to the death of Lieut. Lowry, Capt. Fred Nelson of Selfridge Field said at Toledo. Far off his course in fog and snow on the Chicago-Cleveland run, Lowry tried to make a parachute jump near Deshler, O. His 'chute' caught on the rigging and he dangled there while the craft plunged into a creek bank. 'Any commercial pilot,' Capt. Nelson declared, 'would have been killed had he been up against the same circumstances which faced Lowry.' He added that 'radios have broken on commercial ships' and that 'you can't follow a radio beacon and stay on your course if your radio isn't working.'"

Of 30 Curtiss O-1G Falcons built, ten were refitted with a Curtiss V-1570 Conqueror engine and cockpit canopy and redesignated O-39s.

22 February
"An unidentified mail pilot was reported forced down in the vicinity of Goshen, Ind., without serious mishap, and the mail was forwarded by train."
22 February
Flying the U.S. Mail, Lieutenant Charles P. Hollstein, also given as Hollestein, "out of Cleveland for Washington, was forced down near Uniontown, Pa., in a heavy fog. His plane was damaged, but he escaped unscathed and the mail was saved, according to reports sent to Cleveland airport." According to another account, he "suffered superficial face injuries, but after reporting at Uniontown, walked back into the hills to his plane and returned with the mail to send it on by train. He had been fifty miles off course when he crashed. Hollstein attributed his accident to a faulty radio." Hollstein was piloting Boeing P-12C, 31-235, c/n 1351, when he came down at Woodstock, Pennsylvania.
22 February
U.S. Army Air Corps pilot Lieutenant James McCoy, also reported as H. M. McCoy, and Howard M. McCoy, flying the U.S. Mail, departed Newark at ~noon, but landed his aircraft in a cow pasture at Dishtown, Pennsylvania, in the Alleghenies, with a burned out engine two hours later. He was not hurt. "His ship was smashed against a clump of trees but he escaped with a cut face." He turned the mail over to the post officer at Woodland. "For several hours officers at Newark were badly worried for him." A United Press account states that "At Clearfield, Pennsylvania, Lieut, H. M. McCoy, saved his load of mail, bound for Cleveland from Newark, after his motor caught fire. He was forced down, but the mail went on by train."
22 February
Lieutenant Frederick Irving Patrick (1893–1934), a native of Decatur, Nebraska, is killed in the forced landing of Boeing P-26 Peashooter, 33–46, c/n 1822, of the 55th Pursuit Squadron, 20th Fighter Group, Barksdale Field, Shreveport, Louisiana, whilst on a flight from Barksdale to Denison, Texas, his machine coming down at a location described in one source as an emergency field 10 miles from Denison, and as being only 1.5 miles S of Denison in another. An Associated Press bulletin states that "his pursuit plane crashed into a plowed field one mile from here (Denison) at 9:50 a. m. today." Lt. Patrick had been en route to Denison to visit his father on his birthday when he experienced a throttle control malfunction. His death was the third air fatality for Barksdale Field. He was interred with military honors at Arlington National Cemetery, Virginia. "He had expected to go to Shreveport, La., today (23 February) to complete organization of the air mail field there."
22 February

Caught in weather thick with rain and fog, Liet. Harold Diet [sic], crashed in a field near Marion Station, Md. last night (22 February) on his way from Newark, N. J. to Richmond, Va., with mail. He was carried to a hospital with severe head injuries. 'Take care of the mails,' he said to persons who had rushed to the place where his plane had been wrecked against a tree. This pilot is also correctly reported as Harold L. Dietz, in Douglas O-38B, 31-437, coming down near Crisfield, Maryland,

at "about six o'clock" in the evening. "He was rushed to the McCready Hospital at Crisfield, suffering from a fractured skull and internal damages." He had departed Newark at 1600 hours after flights to the west had been suspended for several hours because of bad weather over the mountains with more coming in from that direction.

22 February
"Lieut. R. M. Barton, speeding along the Jacksonville-Richmond route, was forced to land at Cocoa, Fla., by a heavy fog. He made a safe landing."
23 February
A US Army Air Corps Curtiss O-39 Falcon, 32-219, assigned to the air mail service crashes in bad weather near Fremont, Ohio, with pilot Lt. Norman R. Burnett suffering a fractured leg upon descending by parachute. A news report states that "One ankle was broken and he suffered exposure to the bitter cold for five hours while dragging himself to a farmhouse." According to an Associated Press item, the pilot was taken to Memorial Hospital in Fremont from where he reported his condition to superior officers in Cleveland. "At the time of the accident he was flying an empty run from Cleveland to Chicago." Joe Baugher cites crash date as 23 August 1934.
23 February
Three Air Corps crew are forced down in an aircraft in the Atlantic off of Rockaway Point, New York, whilst en route from Mitchel Field, New York, to Langley Field, Virginia, to pick up mail planes. Planes and vessels searched the sea off New York for the body of Lieutenant George F. McDermott, described by the press as the fifth flier to die in connection with the army's task of carrying the air mail. Forced down amidst "crashing waves", McDermott's two companions, Lieutenants J. H. Rothrock and W. S. Pocock, were picked up by the U.S. Navy destroyer USS Bernadou. They were reported to be "weak from exposure." The vessel could not find McDermott, nor salvage the disintegrating plane. "McDermott, whose family lives in Greenfield, Pa., slipped to his death in the icy Atlantic hours after the plane faltered and alighted. His companions, clad in heavy flying suits and weakened by exposure, could not help him." McDermott, "23, battled side by side with his companions, Lieut. J. H. Rothrock and Lieut. W. S. Pocock, for five hours on the ice-covered wings of the plane before he died, the sixth to lose his life in connection with preparations for the army to fly the mail. Once, in the almost super-human struggle of the three to cut loose the craft's motors and keep afloat, he fell into the choppy sea. Doggedly, he swam back to where his companions could pull him aboard again. The could [sic] was intense and a stiff wind whipped the waves high. Again McDermott's grip failed and he slid away from his companions and into the water, apparently unconscious. Rothrock and Pocock couldn't reach him, and within a moment he had disappeared. Ten minutes later rescuers from the destroyed [sic] Bernadou – leading a fleet of ships and planes which had sought for hours to reach the pilots – reached the almost submerged [sic] craft and took off Rothrock and Pocock. James H. Rothrock was listed as the pilot of this flight, in Douglas C-29 Dolphin, 33-293, c/n 1184, one of only two of the C-29 amphibious flying boats acquired by the Air Corps. An Associated Press wire photo is published 2 March 1934 showing Pocock and Rothrock recovering in hospital.

27 February

LOS ANGELES, Feb. 27. – An army mail plane, piloted by Lieut. M. J. Walsh, finished its trip from Salt Lake City on its back and on the wrong airport today. The pilot put his plane down on the Grand Central air terminal instead of the United airport, the army's base of operation for the transportation of air mail.Spectators of the accident said Walsh apparently braked before the tail skid had touched the ground and the momentum carried the plane over in a neat somersault. Walsh was uninjured, but the ship was damaged. It was not explained why he landed at the wrong airport. Walsh was flying Douglas O-38E, 34-16.

=== March ===
9 March
An engine fails during a night takeoff causing a Keystone B-6A, 32–148, piloted by Lt. Walter W. Reid, to crash near Daytona, Florida, shortly after departing the airport there, while carrying the southbound U.S. Mail. Passenger Pvt. Ernest B. Sell, the plane's mechanic, of Indiana, Pennsylvania, is killed. "Liet. W. M. Reid, and Floyd Marshall, a private, were injured. The motors failed and the plane fell in a heavily wooden section two miles south of this city."

Barely airborne, the Keystone began to lose power. Reid fought to keep the lumbering plane in the air while Sell, in the rear cockpit, struggled with the fuel pump, trying to get the line cleared. At five hundred feet the engines quit and the bomber dropped in a stall. It slammed into a cypress swamp adjoining the field. When the splinters stopped flying, Reid and Marshall were clear of the plane and unhurt, but Private First Class Sell had not been so lucky. His head had been smashed by the impact. He was dead.

This source also reports the survivor's name as A. M. Marshall. Reid, of Albany, Georgia, a Reserve officer on active duty, was seriously shaken. Floyd M. Marshall, of Lincoln, Nebraska, had a broken arm.

9 March
The crash of Curtiss O-39 Falcon, 32-217, near Burton, Ohio, kills Lt. Otto Wienecke, while flying the U.S. Mail. Datelined from Chardon, Ohio, an Associated Press account states,

Army Air Mail Pilot Otto Wienecke, flying from Newark, N. J., to Cleveland with the mail, crashed to his death in the midst of a heavy snow squall this morning on a farm northwest of Burton, near here. Chardon is about 20 miles directly east of Cleveland. The plane was destroyed, but ten bags of mail were salvaged and brought to the postoffice [sic] here. John Hess, a farmer in whose pasture the plane crashed, said he and several neighbors heard the plane's motors about 5 a. m. (EST). It apparently was sputtering, and Hess rushed out in time to see the crash. Coroner Philip Pease reported looking at the ship's altimeter and finding a reading of 600 feet. Hess said Wienecke apparently had no opportunity to save himself. His safety belt was still hooked when the farmer reached his side. Hess declared the snow was coming down in a heavy swirl at the time of the accident. Since the army took over the mail flights, six other army pilots have been killed, either while flying mail, making unofficial flights, or reporting to army posts.

Wienecke was buried on Long Island, New York, on 11 March, with six Lieutenants of the 5th Aero Squadron as pallbearers and honors rendered by a firing squad and bugler from Mitchel Field.

9 March
A Douglas O-38E, 34-18, flying U.S. Mail crashes "in flames" on takeoff from Cheyenne, Wyoming, killing 2d. Lt. Frank L. Howard and Air Reserve 2d. Lt. Arthur R. "Duke" Kerwin. The Associated Press reported that "The fliers killed last night, Lieuts. A. R. Kerwin of March Field, Calif., and F. L. Howard of Shreveport, La., were seeking to familiarize themselves with the Cheyenne-Salt Lake City route when the plane plunged in the darkness and hit the power line."

The accident occurred about 150 yards from the Cheyenne airport. Eye witnesses said the ship developed motor trouble soon after taking off from the Cheyenne field. They said the two lieutenants, bound for Salt Lake City, circled over the city once after they took off from the field and then headed west. Their motor sputtered and the men circled again, apparently attempting to head back to the field. The plane struck the power line, turned a loop and crashed almost nose first into the ground. It made a hole three feet deep in the earth. A huge ball of fire burst from the ship and in a second it was a mass of flames, easily seen from the Cheyenne airport where employes [sic] had been watching the plane. Before aid could reach the two lieutenants they were burned to death. The flames drove back rescuers who tried to reach them. After first striking the earth the plane bounced about 50 yards, where it came to rest. The plane was not loaded with mail at the time of the crash, as the men had taken off on a night trial run to Salt Lake City. They recently had been transferred here as the army took over the air mail lines. Although Kerwin formerly lived in Cheyenne he was unfamiliar with the airport and transcontinental air line near here. Had the men been familiar with the country near the airport it was believed by aviation officials they could have made a safe landing. There are a number of smooth fields surrounding the airport. The ship was an open type used by the army for observation purposes.

9 March

Hartsville, S. C., Mar. 10. (AP) – Three army mail fliers who became lost last night en route from Richmond to Miami when their radio went bad landed near here in rain and fog early today with only a slight damage to the ship and no injuries to its occupants. The craft was piloted by Lieut. Allen of Michigan. With him were Sgt. Harry Shilling, a native of Harrisburg, Pa., but now living in Richmond, and a corporal who was taken on the ship at Washington. Immediately after bringing the mail here and sending it to Florence 25 miles away, by motor, the men went to sleep in the rear of the postoffice [sic] and authorities refused to rouse them for questioning. Shilling, however, had said Allen – whose first name he did not know – was piloting the ship. The sergeant did not know the name of the corporal. Shilling said they left Richmond last night about 8:30 and expected to land at Florence, but their radio went bad and they cruised about until they found the landing field near here.

30 March
While on landing approach to Davenport, Iowa, Lt. Thurmond A. Wood, flying U.S. Mail in a Curtiss A-12 Shrike, 33-246, enters a severe thunderstorm. Attempting to reverse course, he loses control and spins in on a farm at DeWitt, Iowa, with fatal result. This aircraft probably was of the 3d Attack Group at Fort Crockett. Texas. "Wood was flying to Omaha with 23 pouches of mail. The plane crashed in the field of William Mommsen, farmer living five and one half miles northeast of Dewitt. [sic] It was discovered by Leonard McGuire, a farmer living nearby. There were no witnesses to the crash. Wood left Chicago at 7:15 p. m. for Des Moines." "His body was crushed between the motor and a load of mail he was carrying." "His body was badly mutilated. The nose of the plane was buried four feet in the ground." "The motor was torn loose." This was the twelfth Army death in the effort to fly the mail. "It marked the first fatality, however, since the army resumed the mail routes since a suspension of service." "Clinton County Coroner L. O. Riggert took charge of the body. It was to be taken to Dewitt." [sic] "Mail pouches scattered over the ground were collected by a crowd of farmers. They were turned over to postal authorities at Clinton. Coroner Riggert obtained a tractor from a neighboring farmer and attempted to pull away the fuselage to get to the pilot's body. There was no fire."

31 March

SACRAMENTO, March 31. – Eastbound airmail was delayed approximately six hours here early today when an army plane piloted by Lieut. C. B. Stone snipped off the top of a power pole as he was preparing to land at the municipal airport. Lieutenant Stone was able to keep the plane under control and brought it to a safe landing. Because of slight damage to wings and struts, it was decided to bring a relief ship from Oakland to continue the trip eastward.

=== April ===
5 April

ALTOONA, Pa., April 5. – Second Lieut. John Leland McAlister of Langley Field, Va., leaped to his death late today a few seconds before his army ship crashed into the side of Healy's mountain, one of the rugged peaks that stud the area known as the 'graveyard of aviators.'Three farmers in a field about five miles west of the Duncansville (Altoona) airport saw the reserve officer suddenly rise in the plane as it roared toward the rocky mountainside and leap from the cockpit, less than 200 feet in the air. Slashing their way through the dense underbrush and rolling terrain of "Maple hollow," the farmers found the body resting against a tree, 80 feet from the wreckage of the plane, which had rolled 100 feet down the mountainside. Unable to determine the cause, airmen said the pilot might have been trying to fly between Healy's mountain and Pomeroy mountain, realized something had happened to his controls and decided to risk an almost certain death by such a short leap rather than dash against the bare mountainside. The pilot's log stated he left his home port, Langley field [sic], this morning and made stops at Bolling field [sic] and Middletown, Pa. The last entry was 3 p.m., on leaving Middletown. He was ferrying the empty ship to Cleveland for use in the mail service.

Langley Field authorities said that McAlister joined the Air Corps as an assistant engineering officer one year ago, and that he was assigned to air mail duty recently. He was flying Curtiss P-6E Hawk, 32-270.

15 April
While flying the U.S. Mail, 1st Lt. Arthur Lahman's engine on his Douglas O-38B, 31-435, c/n 995, '22', of Headquarters Command, Bolling Field, cuts out on approach to Newark, New Jersey, and crashes in a field. Pilot uninjured but airframe written off. Pilot name also reported spelt Arthur J. Lehman.

23 April
Major Charles Belding "Barney" Oldfield, Jr., a regional commander for the Air Corps mail western zone, neglects to lower the undercarriage of Martin YB-10, 33-147, in preparation for landing at Cheyenne, Wyoming, and bellys the bomber in.
