= Pennsylvania Route 970 =

State highway in Clearfield County, Pennsylvania, US

Pennsylvania Route 970

Route information
- Maintained by PennDOT
- Length: 5.20 mi (8.37 km)
- Existed: 1928–present

Major junctions
- South end: US 322 in Woodland
- I-80 in Bradford Township
- North end: PA 879 in Shawville

Location
- Country: United States
- State: Pennsylvania
- Counties: Clearfield

Highway system
- Pennsylvania State Route System; Interstate; US; State; Scenic; Legislative
← PA 969	→ PA 971

Pennsylvania Route 970 (PA 970) is a 5.20-mile-long (8.37 km) state highway in Clearfield County, Pennsylvania. The route runs from U.S. Route 322 (US 322) in Woodland to PA 879 in Shawville.

== Route description ==
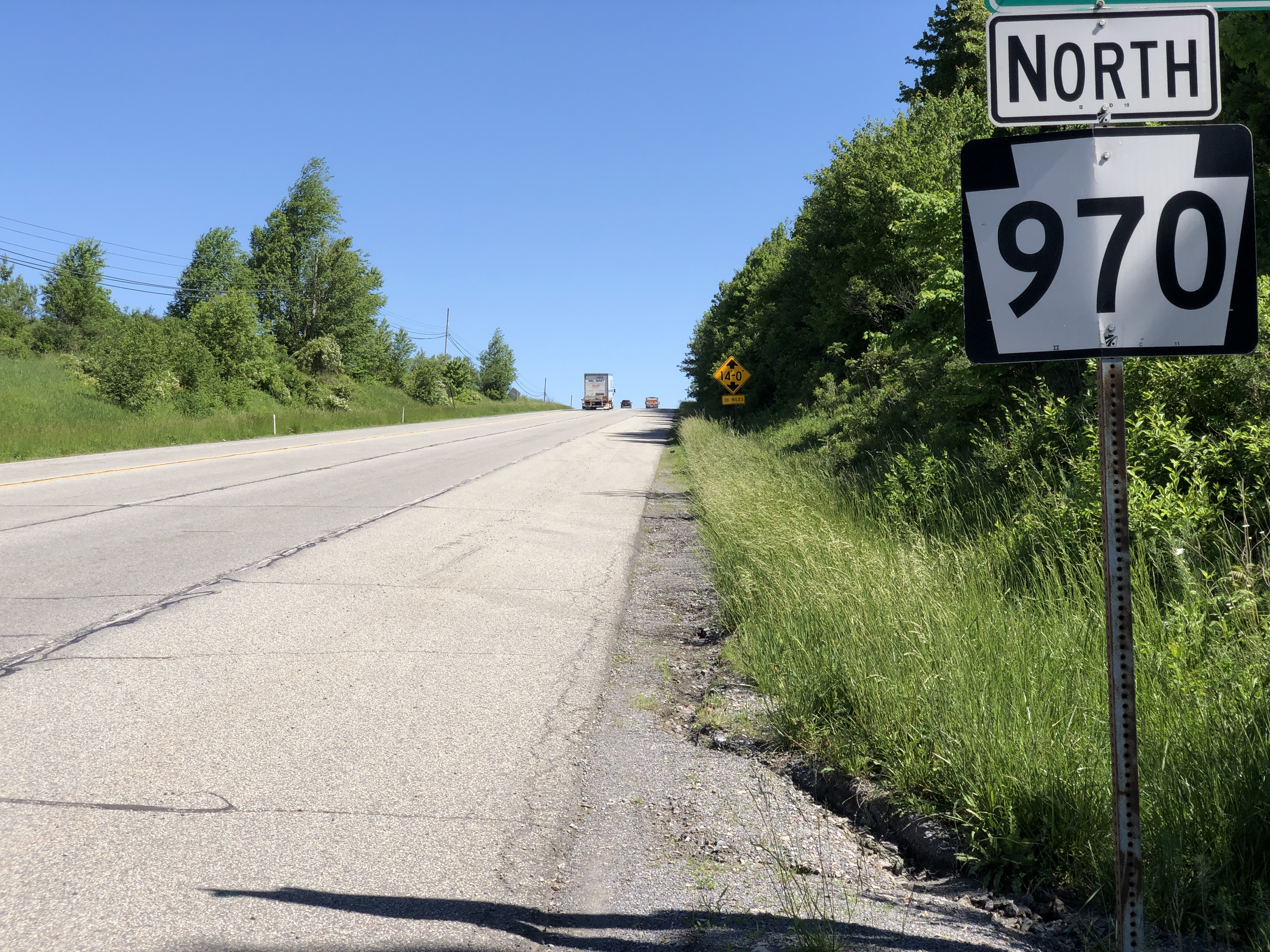
PA 970 northbound past US 322 in Bradford Township

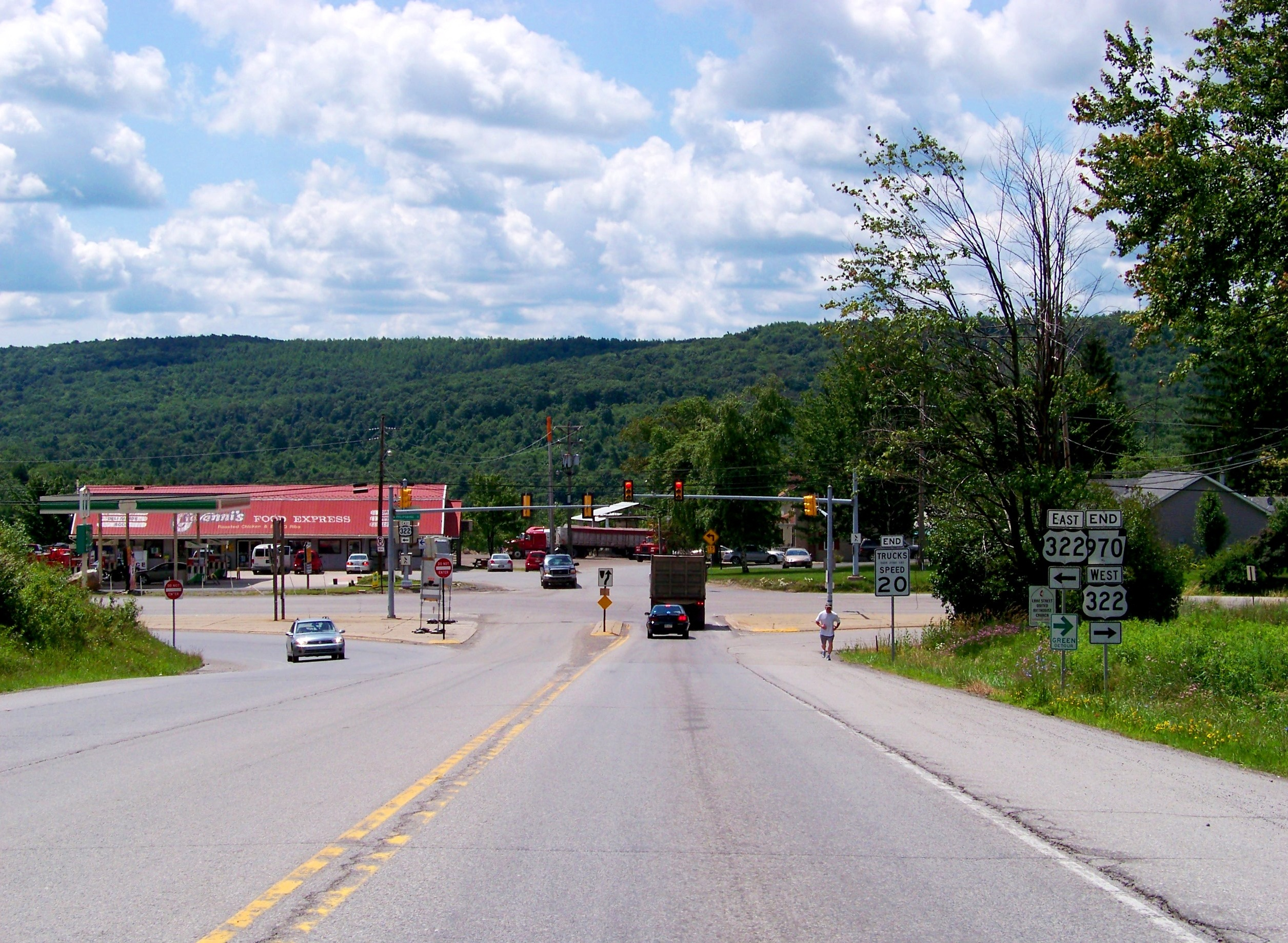
PA 970's southern terminus at US 322

PA 970 begins at an intersection with US 322 in Bradford Township, heading north on Shawville Highway, a three-lane undivided road with two northbound lanes and one southbound lane. The road runs through a mix of fields and woods with some commercial development, with the lane configuration changing to two southbound lanes and one northbound lane as it runs near a shopping center. Farther north, the route comes to an interchange with I-80. Past this interchange, PA 970 becomes a two-lane road and continues north through agricultural areas with some woods and homes, passing through Pleasant Valley. The route heads into more forested areas and heads north-northwest, crossing under a R.J. Corman Railroad line and running near the Shawville Generating Station before crossing the West Branch Susquehanna River into Goshen Township, where it ends at PA 879 in Shawville.

== History ==
PA 970 once extended further south into Clearfield County and western Centre County. Its former southern terminus was at PA 350 in Sandy Ridge. It traveled northwest along present-day SR 3049 into Osceola Mills. In Osceola Mills, PA 970 ran along Curtin Street to PA 53 (Stone Street), turned left onto PA 53 forming a wrong-way concurrency with it along Stone Street and Sarah Street until leaving the concurrency by making a right onto Elizabeth Street. The designation followed Drane Highway and Salem Road north through Decatur and Boggs Townships. Prior to 2002, PA 970 turned left onto Salem Road following present-day SR 2049 to Bigley, SR 2030 west to Woodland, and SR 2049 north to US 322 at its present southern terminus. After 2002 but before its truncation to Woodland, PA 970 traveled east along Link Road (SR 2034 and SR 2029) to US 322 outside of Wallaceton. PA 970 then turned left onto US 322 following it northwest to its present southern terminus near Woodland.

== Major intersections ==
The entire route is in Clearfield County.

Location	mi	km	Destinations	Notes
Bradford Township	0.00	0.00	US 322 – Clearfield, Philipsburg	Southern terminus
Bradford Township	1.52	2.45	I-80 – Bellefonte, DuBois	Exit 123 on I-80
Goshen Township	5.20	8.37	PA 879 (Shawville Croft Highway) – Clearfield, Karthaus	Northern terminus
1.000 mi = 1.609 km; 1.000 km = 0.621 mi
