= Henry County Airport =

Henry County Airport may refer to:

- Henry County Airport (Tennessee) in Henry County, Tennessee, United States (FAA/IATA: PHT)
- Henry County Airport (Ohio) in Henry County, Ohio, United States (FAA: 7W5)
- Clayton County Airport - Tara Field, (formerly Henry County Airport) located in Henry County but owned and operated by Clayton County, Georgia, United States (FAA: 4A7)
