= Frenchville =

Frenchville may refer to:

== Australia ==
- Frenchville, Queensland, a suburb in the city of Rockhampton

== United States ==
- Frenchville, Maine
- Frenchville, New York
- Frenchville, Pennsylvania
- Frenchville, Wisconsin
