= Shawville, Pennsylvania =

Unincorporated community in Pennsylvania, US

- Unincorporated community
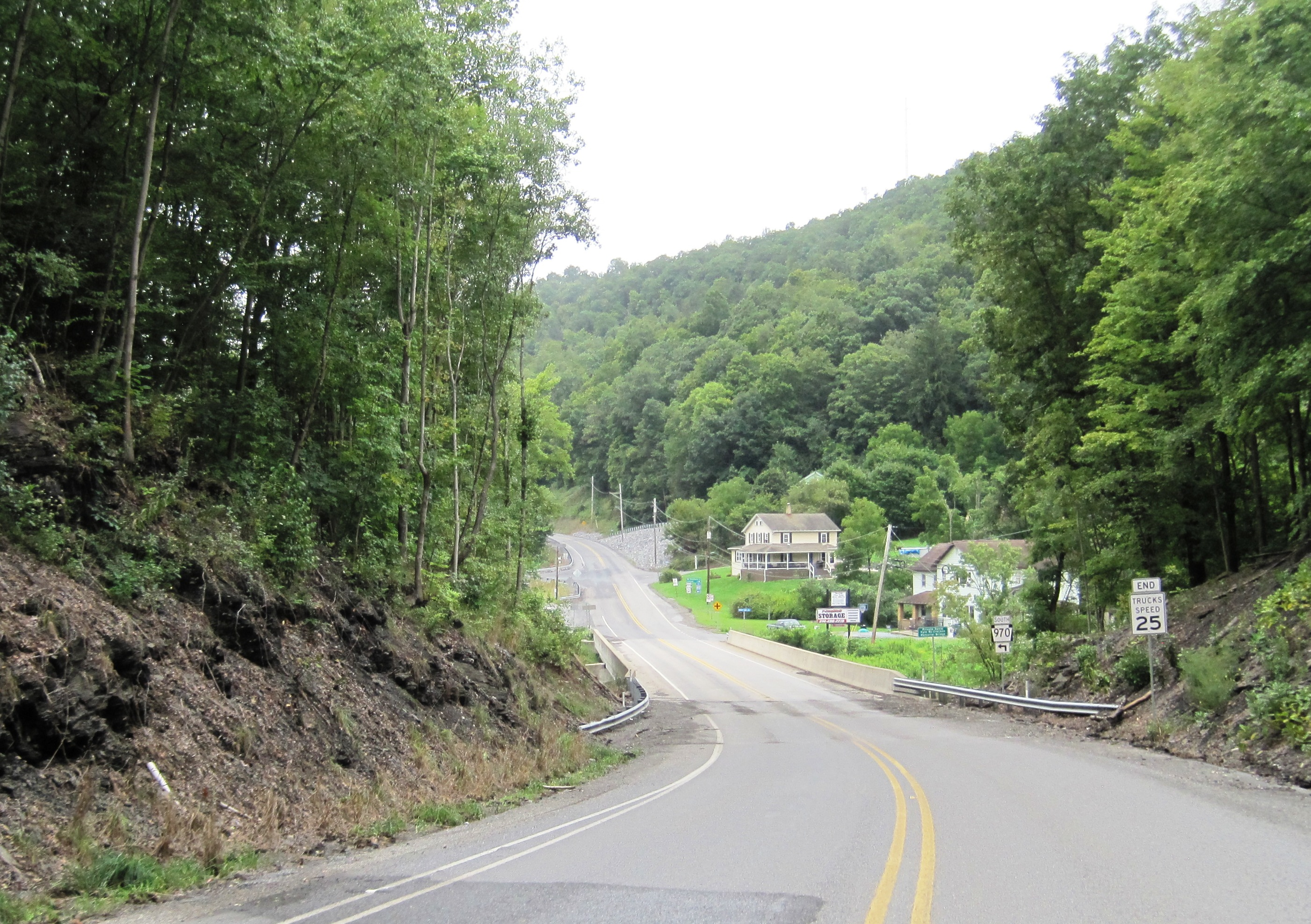
- PA 879 westbound entering Shawville

- Location within Pennsylvania
- Coordinates: 41°04′09″N 78°21′29″W
- Country: United States
- State: Pennsylvania
- County: Clearfield
- Elevation: 1,089 ft (332 m)
- Time zone: UTC-5 (Eastern (EST))
  - Summer (DST): UTC-4 (EDT)
- ZIP code: 16873
- Area code: 814
- GNIS feature ID: 1187412

Shawville is an unincorporated community in Clearfield County, Pennsylvania, United States. The community is located along the West Branch Susquehanna River at the intersection of Pennsylvania Route 879 and Pennsylvania Route 970, 5.1 miles (8.2 km) northeast of Clearfield. Shawville has a post office, with ZIP code 16873.

There is no independent demographic data available for Shawville.

== Notable Site ==
- Shawville Generating Station was a 626 megawatt coal-fired power station formerly run by GenOn Energy. In December 2016, the plant was converted to a 590 megawatt natural gas power station. In a 2011 investigation conducted by several environmental groups, including the Environmental Integrity Project (EIP), EarthJustice, and the Sierra Club, Shawville ranked third in the amount of toxic emissions produced per station nationwide.
