= Clarence, Pennsylvania =

Unincorporated community in Pennsylvania, US

- Census-designated place
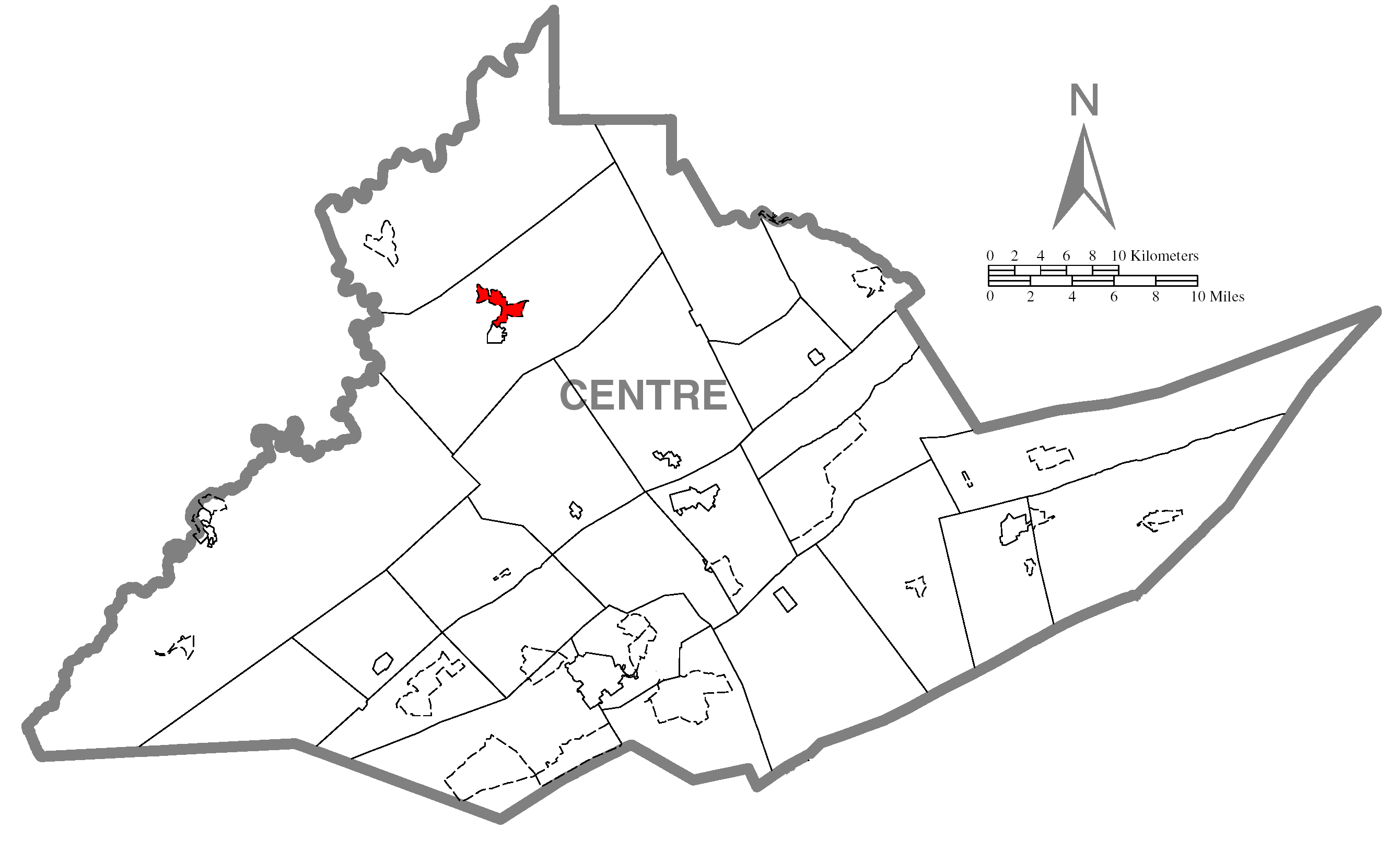
- Location of Clarence in Centre County

- Location of Centre County in Pennsylvania
- Coordinates: 41°02′53″N 77°56′25″W
- Country: United States
- State: Pennsylvania
- County: Centre
- Township: Snow Shoe

Area
  - Total: 2.66 sq mi (6.88 km^{2})
  - Land: 2.66 sq mi (6.88 km^{2})
  - Water: 0 sq mi (0.00 km^{2})
- Elevation: 1,400 ft (430 m)

Population (2020)
  - Total: 604
  - Density: 227.3/sq mi (87.75/km^{2})
- Time zone: UTC-5 (Eastern (EST))
  - Summer (DST): UTC-4 (EDT)
- ZIP code: 16829
- FIPS code: 42-13768
- GNIS feature ID: 1171899

Clarence is a census-designated place (CDP) in Centre County, Pennsylvania, United States. It is part of the State College, Pennsylvania Metropolitan Statistical Area. The population was 626 at the 2010 census.

== Geography ==
Clarence is located in northern Centre County near the geographic center of Snow Shoe Township. It is bordered on the south by the borough of Snow Shoe. Exit 147 on Interstate 80 is 3 miles (5 km) south of Clarence on the southeastern edge of Snow Shoe borough.

According to the United States Census Bureau, the CDP has a total area of 1.65 square miles (4.27 km^{2}), all land. The town is in the valley of the North Fork of Beech Creek, which flows east to Bald Eagle Creek, a tributary of the West Branch Susquehanna River.

=== Climate ===
Climate data for Clarence, Pennsylvania (1991–2020)
Month	Jan	Feb	Mar	Apr	May	Jun	Jul	Aug	Sep	Oct	Nov	Dec	Year
Mean daily maximum °F (°C)	33.2 (0.7)	36.5 (2.5)	45.6 (7.6)	59.3 (15.2)	70.3 (21.3)	77.9 (25.5)	81.9 (27.7)	80.7 (27.1)	74.4 (23.6)	61.8 (16.6)	49.0 (9.4)	37.8 (3.2)	59.0 (15.0)
Daily mean °F (°C)	23.4 (−4.8)	25.1 (−3.8)	33.5 (0.8)	45.3 (7.4)	55.1 (12.8)	63.8 (17.7)	67.7 (19.8)	66.2 (19.0)	59.2 (15.1)	48.3 (9.1)	37.4 (3.0)	29.2 (−1.6)	46.2 (7.9)
Mean daily minimum °F (°C)	13.6 (−10.2)	13.6 (−10.2)	21.4 (−5.9)	31.2 (−0.4)	39.9 (4.4)	49.6 (9.8)	53.4 (11.9)	51.7 (10.9)	44.0 (6.7)	34.8 (1.6)	25.8 (−3.4)	20.6 (−6.3)	33.3 (0.7)
Average precipitation inches (mm)	3.17 (81)	2.56 (65)	3.62 (92)	3.78 (96)	4.13 (105)	4.15 (105)	3.97 (101)	4.07 (103)	4.45 (113)	3.80 (97)	3.31 (84)	3.46 (88)	44.47 (1,130)
Average snowfall inches (cm)	12.8 (33)	11.5 (29)	11.4 (29)	1.7 (4.3)	0.0 (0.0)	0.0 (0.0)	0.0 (0.0)	0.0 (0.0)	0.0 (0.0)	0.8 (2.0)	3.1 (7.9)	9.0 (23)	50.3 (128.2)
Source: NOAA

== Demographics ==
Historical population
Census	Pop.	Note	%±
2020	604		—
U.S. Decennial Census

As of the census of 2000, there were 577 people, 226 households, and 169 families living in the CDP. The population density was 350.6 inhabitants per square mile (135.4/km^{2}). There were 246 housing units at an average density of 149.5 per square mile (57.7/km^{2}). The racial makeup of the CDP was 99.31% White, 0.17% Native American, and 0.52% from two or more races. Hispanic or Latino of any race were 0.17% of the population.

Of those 226 households, 31.4% had children under the age of 18 living with them, 62.4% were married couples living together, 7.1% had a female householder with no husband present, and 25.2% were non-families. 23.0% of all households were made up of individuals, and 15.5% had someone living alone who was 65 years of age or older. The average household size was 2.55 and the average family size was 3.02.

In the CDP, the population was spread out, with 24.3% under the age of 18, 7.6% from 18 to 24, 26.5% from 25 to 44, 23.9% from 45 to 64, and 17.7% who were 65 years of age or older. The median age was 39 years. For every 100 females, there were 110.6 males. For every 100 females age 18 and over, there were 99.5 males.

The median income for a household in the CDP was $31,447, and the median income for a family was $40,375. Males had a median income of $27,500 versus $22,045 for females. The per capita income for the CDP was $16,666. About 2.3% of families and 6.5% of the population were below the poverty line, including 4.3% of those under age 18 and 11.1% of those age 65 or over.
