= Frenchville French =

French dialect of Frenchville, Pennsylvania, US

- Français de Frènchville
- Native to: Frenchville, Pennsylvania
- Native speakers: 2 (2007)
- Language family: Indo-European: Italic; Latino-Faliscan; Latinic; Romance; Italo-Western; Western Romance; Gallo-Iberian; Gallo-Romance; Gallo-Rhaetian?; Arpitan–Oïl; Oïl; Francien zone; French; Frenchville French

Language codes
- ISO 639-3: –

Frenchville French is a moribund French dialect spoken in Frenchville, Pennsylvania, United States. Frenchville is a small community of Covington Township in Clearfield County. The language was the subject of fieldwork by linguist Barbara Bullock, the co-author of a range of journal articles relating to phonological patterns observed in French dialects.

== History ==
The settlement of Frenchville, Covington Township was established in 1835 by Messrs Zavron and John Keaton in order to settle a debt made by a person in Philadelphia. Zavron, who was a merchant in Paris, France, persuaded around 40 families to emigrate to the property within five years with the help of a German agent. The settlers were from Haute-Saône and Haute-Marne, eastern departments of France. Frenchville is hidden by hills and is not surrounded by major cities or landmarks, but visitors can see a graveyard containing a life sized Christ figure on a large cross that overlooks the enclosed town. The settlers who worked in farms, mines, and railroads used minimal English when necessary, and as a result of not having exposure to French words for new inventions, word borrowing took place for words such as 'television' and 'radio.' Until sometime in the 1960s, primary schooling was local.

Since the school system after the late 1960s discouraged French speakers from using the language, written French literacy was hardly, if ever, achieved by the residents. While the fourth generation is able to understand the French language and not speak it, the younger generations are unable to do either.

== Geographic distribution ==
Frenchville French is native to Frenchville, Covington Township. It is currently of moribund status. In the year 2000 it was reported that there were 621 inhabitants, and out of that number 182 were of French descent. There are no other variants of this language, and no other languages have been recorded as derivations of it.

== Sounds and phonology ==
Frenchville French uses two distinctive low vowels [a] and [ɑ], which are no longer used in many of the regions of France. The word final /r/ is not consistently used in Frenchville French, even though it is pronounced in Standard French: soir ‘evening’ Standard French [swar], Frenchville French [swɑ]. Reduction of vowels other than schwa also occurs in unstressed syllables: véritable ‘truly’ Standard French [veritabl], Frenchville French [vεrtabl]. Stress-initial patterns in this language also separate it from Standard French. The three forms of the Standard French /r/ are used in Frenchville French even when the words are borrowed from English.

=== Rhoticization of [ø] and [œ] ===
Unlike Standard French, where [œ] and [ø] hold both contrastive and allophonic relationships with one another depending on stress, Frenchville French pronounces these two sounds word-finally similarly to the rhoticized schwa /ɚ/ of American English.

== Grammar ==
=== Morphology ===
Frenchville French has inconsistencies in gender assignment and agreement when compared with Standard French. Over-use of the infinitive form for verbs where finite forms are to be expected are also observed. Finally, the third person plural subject pronoun is no longer ils (masculine) and elles (feminine), but eux.

=== Syntax ===
English word order is used in relative clauses for Frenchville French since the preposition is stranded in the final position in contrast to Standard French, where prepositions lead into the relative.

=== Vocabulary ===
The vocabulary of Frenchville French observes those of the northern regions of France: galendure (Frenchville French) vs. mur (Standard French) 'wall'; septante (Frenchville French) vs. soixante-dix (Standard French). It also involves English-borrowed words such as 'shed,' 'corn,' 'television,' and 'remote.'

== Examples ==
The following sentences are taken from one of three interview sessions (2002, 2003, and 2007) with one of the two remaining speakers of Frenchville. These brothers are known as K (or Ke) and N (or Ne) for the duration of the research project, and the samples from this project have been used for linguistic studies. The questions asked involved the brothers' family, work, and memories of Frenchville as a bilingual community. This sentence was spoken by N during the interview:

Si mon grand-père pi’ mère pi’ mon père prononçaient pas comme il faut, on prononçait pas comme il faut non plus.

‘If my grandfather and mother and my father didn’t pronounce as they should have, we didn’t pronounce as one should either.’

This sentence was used as evidence for overuse of the infinitive for verb:

Ma femme ne parler [INF] pas; sa femme ne parler [INF] pas. (cf. parle)

"My wife doesn’t speak; his wife doesn’t speak."
