= Pine Glen, Pennsylvania =

Unincorporated community in Pennsylvania, US

- Census-designated place
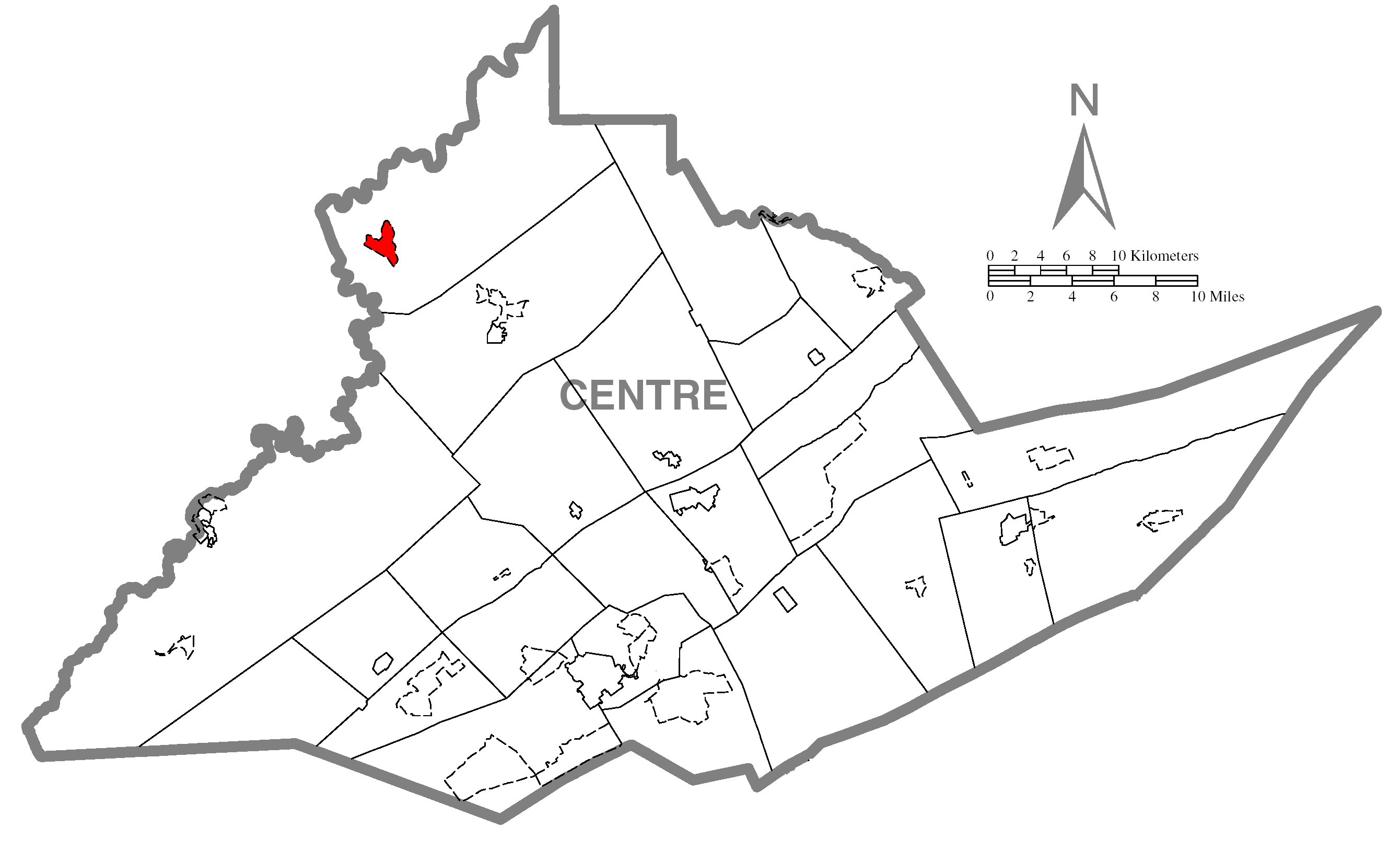
- Location within Centre County

- Location within the U.S. state of Pennsylvania Pine Glen (the United States)
- Coordinates: 41°5′14″N 78°3′14″W
- Country: United States
- State: Pennsylvania
- County: Centre
- Township: Burnside

Area
  - Total: 0.18 sq mi (0.46 km^{2})
  - Land: 0.18 sq mi (0.46 km^{2})
  - Water: 0 sq mi (0.00 km^{2})
- Elevation: 1,530 ft (470 m)

Population (2020)
  - Total: 188
  - Density: 1,051.5/sq mi (405.99/km^{2})
- Time zone: UTC-5 (Eastern (EST))
  - Summer (DST): UTC-4 (EDT)
- FIPS code: 42-60432
- GNIS feature ID: 1183791

Pine Glen is an unincorporated community and census-designated place (CDP) in Centre County, Pennsylvania, United States. It is part of the State College, Pennsylvania Metropolitan Statistical Area. It is part of Burnside Township. The population was 190 at the 2010 census.

== Geography ==
Pine Glen is located in northwestern Centre County at 41°5′14″N 78°3′14″W (41.087326, -78.053805), in the western part of Burnside Township. Pennsylvania Route 879 passes through the community, leading northwest 4 miles (6 km) to Karthaus on the West Branch Susquehanna River and southeast 5 miles (8 km) to Moshannon. The borough of Snow Shoe, with access to Interstate 80, is 8 miles (13 km) southeast of Pine Glen.

According to the United States Census Bureau, the Pine Glen CDP has a total area of 0.18 square miles (0.46 km^{2}), all land.

== Demographics ==
Historical population
Census	Pop.	Note	%±
2000	210		—
2010	190		−9.5%
2020	188		−1.1%
U.S. Decennial Census

As of the census of 2000, there were 210 people, 79 households, and 60 families living in the CDP. The population density was 137.0 inhabitants per square mile (52.9/km^{2}). There were 105 housing units at an average density of 68.5 per square mile (26.4/km^{2}). The racial makeup of the CDP was 99.52% White and 0.48% Asian.

There were 79 households, out of which 27.8% had children under the age of 18 living with them, 70.9% were married couples living together, 2.5% had a female householder with no husband present, and 22.8% were non-families. 16.5% of all households were made up of individuals, and 11.4% had someone living alone who was 65 years of age or older. The average household size was 2.66 and the average family size was 3.03.

In the CDP, the population was spread out, with 22.4% under the age of 18, 9.5% from 18 to 24, 28.6% from 25 to 44, 31.0% from 45 to 64, and 8.6% who were 65 years of age or older. The median age was 37 years. For every 100 females, there were 98.1 males. For every 100 females age 18 and over, there were 106.3 males.

The median income for a household in the CDP was $40,714, and the median income for a family was $45,250. Males had a median income of $27,500 versus $18,125 for females. The per capita income for the CDP was $16,540. About 4.9% of families and 8.9% of the population were below the poverty line, including 6.0% of those under the age of eighteen and 12.0% of those sixty five or over.
