= St. Louis Language Immersion School =

St. Louis Language Immersion Schools

Location
- 4011 Papin Street; St. Louis, Missouri 63110; United States
- 38°37′46″N 90°14′52″W

Information
- Established: 2007
- Website: http://www.sllis.org/

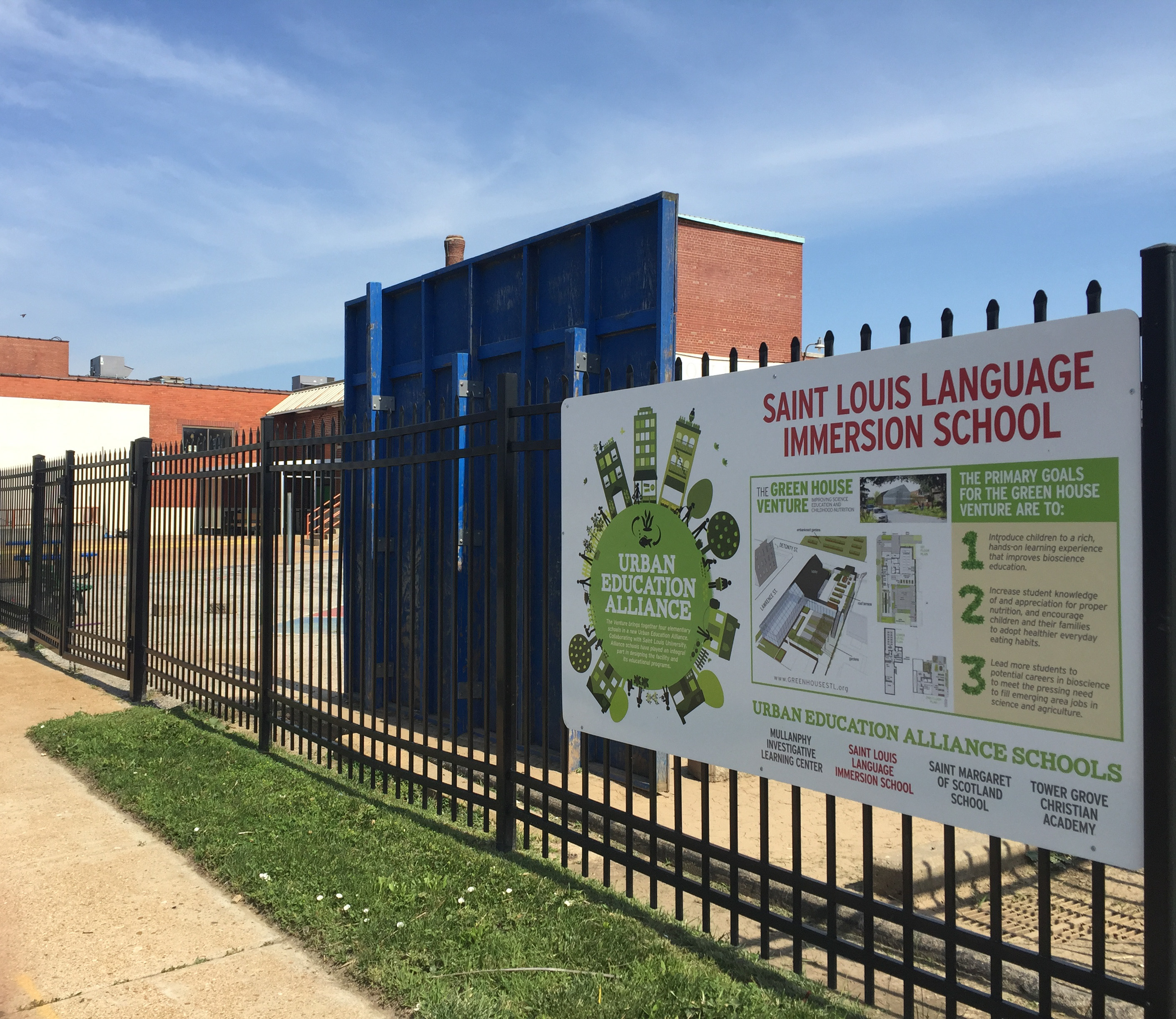
St. Louis Language Immersion School

St. Louis Language Immersion Schools is an organization operating charter schools in St. Louis, Missouri. Its first two schools, The French School and The Spanish School, opened in 2009. The Chinese School opened in 2012.

== History ==
St. Louis Language Immersion Schools (SLLIS) is a non-profit organization founded in 2007 to develop and operate a network of charter schools in St. Louis.

On February 20, 2009, the Missouri Department of Elementary and Secondary Education Board of Commissioners granted the schools a 5-year charter sponsored by the University of Missouri–St. Louis.

The French School and The Spanish School opened in August 2009 with kindergarten and first grade classes. The Chinese School opened in 2012, serving grades K-5, followed by The International School in 2014. Each school will grow one grade per year until SLLIS operates a full K-12 network of programs.

== Campus ==
The school is located at 1881 N. Pine St. in downtown St. Louis. The Chinese Program, The French Program, and The Spanish Program all study on the same campus to maximize resources available to all students. Previously, classes were held on two smaller school buildings before being consolidated onto one larger campus.

== Curriculum ==
The schools no longer follow the International Baccalaureate curricular framework.
