= Burnside Township, Centre County, Pennsylvania =

Township in Pennsylvania, US

Coordinates: 41°07′32″N 77°58′17″W

- Township
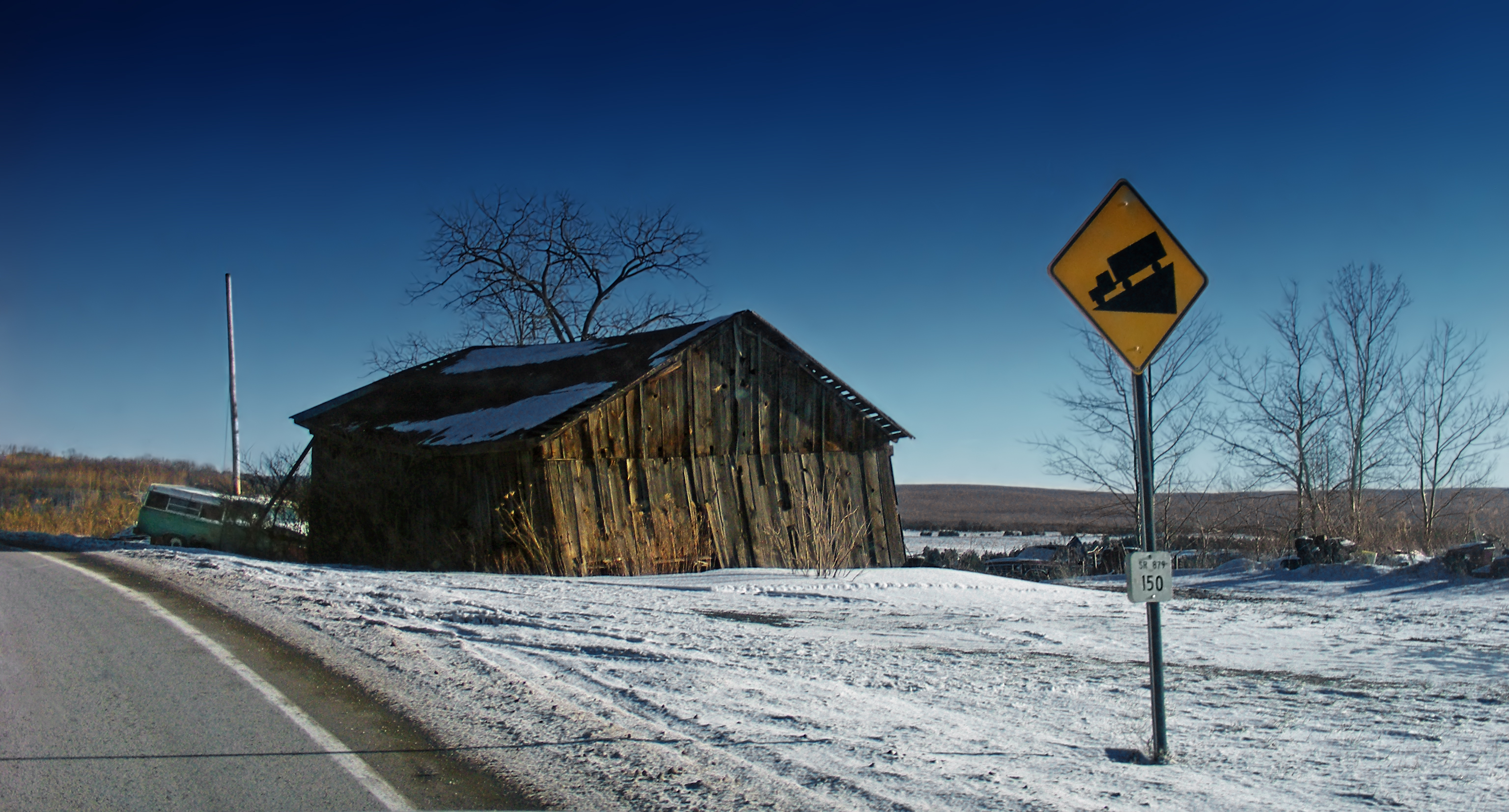
- An old barn on a farm in Burnside Township

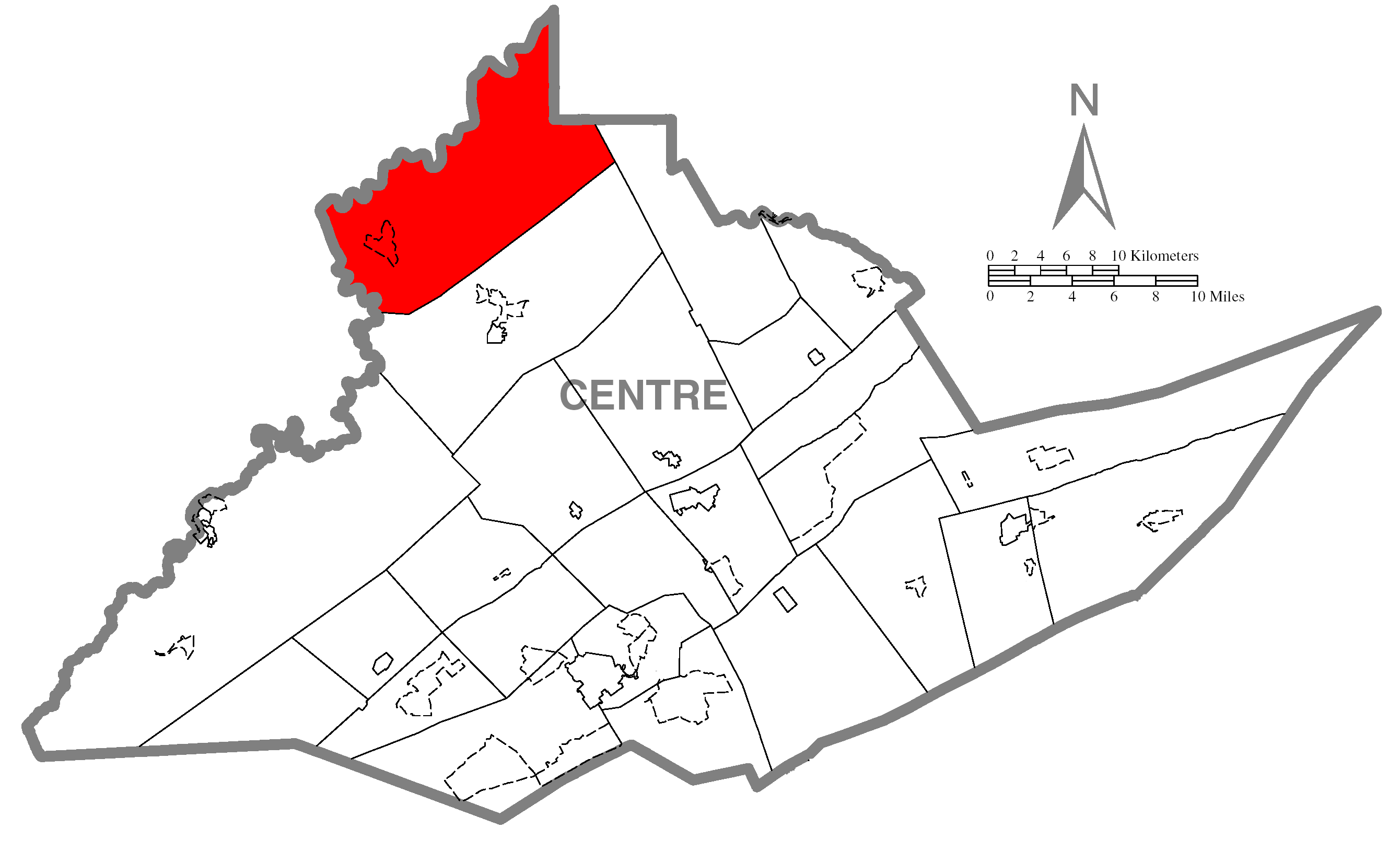
- Map of Centre County, Pennsylvania highlighting Burnside Township

- Map of Centre County, Pennsylvania
- Country: United States
- State: Pennsylvania
- County: Centre
- Settled: 1792
- Incorporated: 1856

Area
  - Total: 90.41 sq mi (234.17 km^{2})
  - Land: 89.63 sq mi (232.14 km^{2})
  - Water: 0.78 sq mi (2.03 km^{2})

Population (2020)
  - Total: 417 ▼
  - Estimate (2021): 414
  - Density: 4.8/sq mi (1.85/km^{2})
- Time zone: UTC-5 (EST)
  - Summer (DST): UTC-4 (EDT)
- FIPS code: 42-027-10272

Burnside Township is a township in Centre County, Pennsylvania, United States. It is part of the State College, Pennsylvania, Metropolitan Statistical Area.

The CDP of Pine Glen is within Burnside Township. The population was 417 at the 2020 census.

== Geography ==
According to the United States Census Bureau, the township has a total area of 90.4 square miles (234.2 km^{2}), of which 89.6 square miles (232.1 km^{2}) is land and 0.77 square miles (2.0 km^{2}), or 0.87%, is water.

Burnside Township is bordered by Clearfield County to the northwest, Clinton County to the north, Curtin Township to the east and Snow Shoe Township to the southeast.

== Demographics ==
Historical population
Census	Pop.	Note	%±
2000	410		—
2010	439		7.1%
2020	417		−5.0%
2021 (est.)	414		−0.7%
U.S. Decennial Census

As of the census of 2000, there were 410 people, 157 households, and 114 families residing in the township.

The population density was 4.8 people per square mile (1.9/km^{2}). There were 325 housing units at an average density of 3.8/sq mi (1.5/km^{2}).

The racial makeup of the township was 99.27% White, 0.24% Asian, and 0.49% from two or more races.

There were 157 households, out of which 26.8% had children under the age of eighteen living with them; 63.1% were married couples living together, 6.4% had a female householder with no husband present, and 26.8% were non-families. 21.0% of all households were made up of individuals, and 11.5% had someone living alone who was sixty-five years of age or older.

The average household size was 2.61 and the average family size was 3.07.

In the township the population was spread out, with 22.4% under the age of eighteen, 8.8% from eighteen to twenty-four, 28.0% from twenty-five to forty-four, 27.6% from forty-five to sixty-four, and 13.2% who were sixty-five years of age or older. The median age was thirty-nine years.

For every one hundred females, there were 102.0 males. For every one hundred females who were aged eighteen or older, there were 109.2 males.

The median income for a household in the township was $31,786, and the median income for a family was $41,786. Males had a median income of $26,250 compared with that of $18,438 for females.

The per capita income for the township was $21,195.

Roughly 10.5% of families and 14.0% of the population were living below the poverty line, including 22.2% of those who were under the age of eighteen and 14.7% of those who were aged sixty-five or older.
