= Bonjour Television =

Bonjour Television Network is an American TV broadcasting company. All of its programmes are aired in the French language.

== History ==
Bonjour Television Network was established in 2013 in Miami, Florida, by Victor J. Romero with the intent of offering programming for French-speaking people in the United States.

The network announced the launch of their first four channels on May 18, 2014: Bonjour Television, Xplore Channel, Bonjour Music and Men's Up.

On September 17, 2014, Bonjour announced the launch of Fight Channel World.

== Programming ==
Bonjour Television offers programmes in the following categories:

- Films
- Drama
- News
- Documentaries (Xplore channel)
- Reality
- Music (Bonjour Music 24/7 channel).
