= Snow Shoe Township, Pennsylvania =

Township in Pennsylvania, US

Coordinates: 41°02′30″N 77°54′59″W

- Township
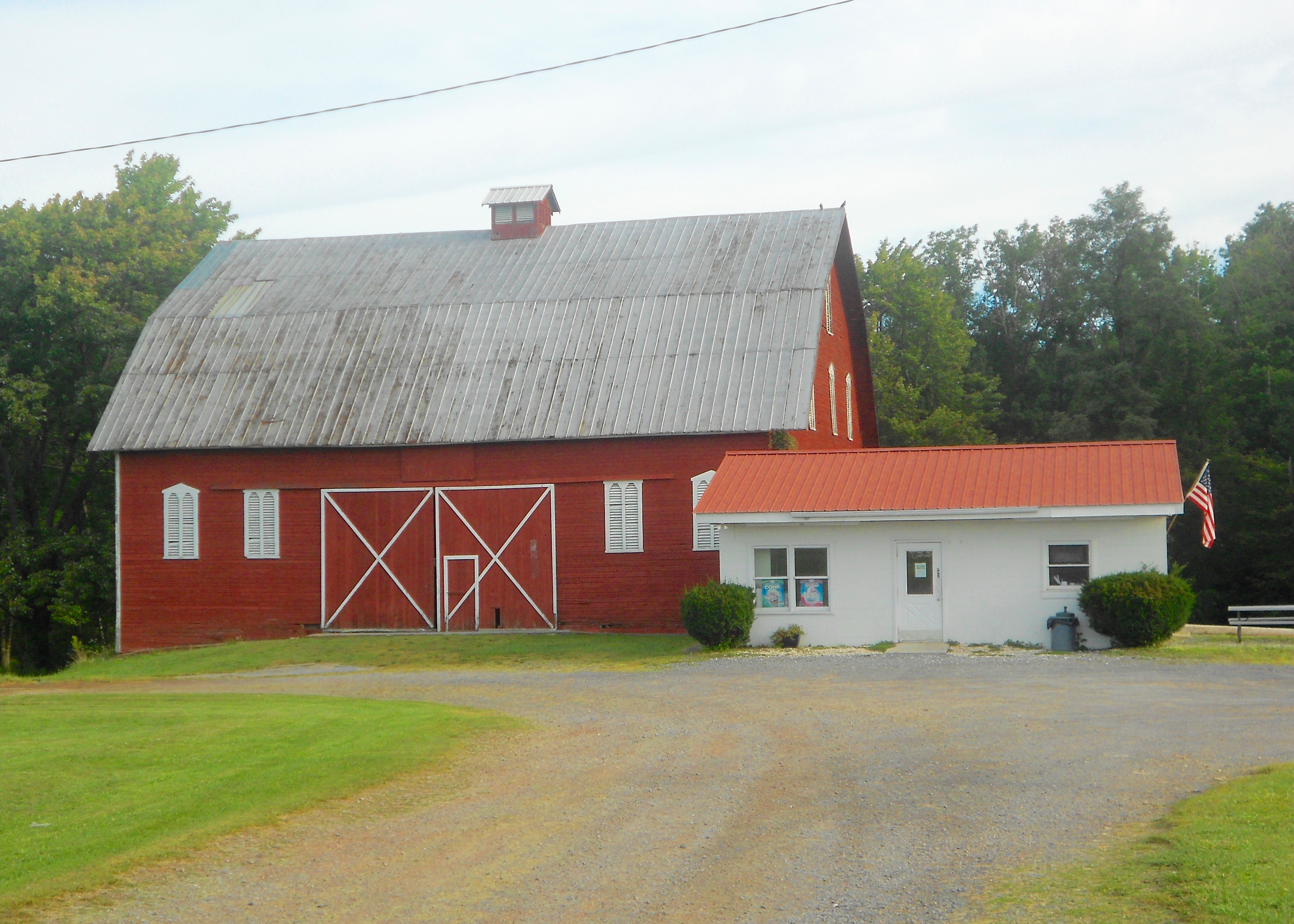
- Barn and ice cream stand near I-80

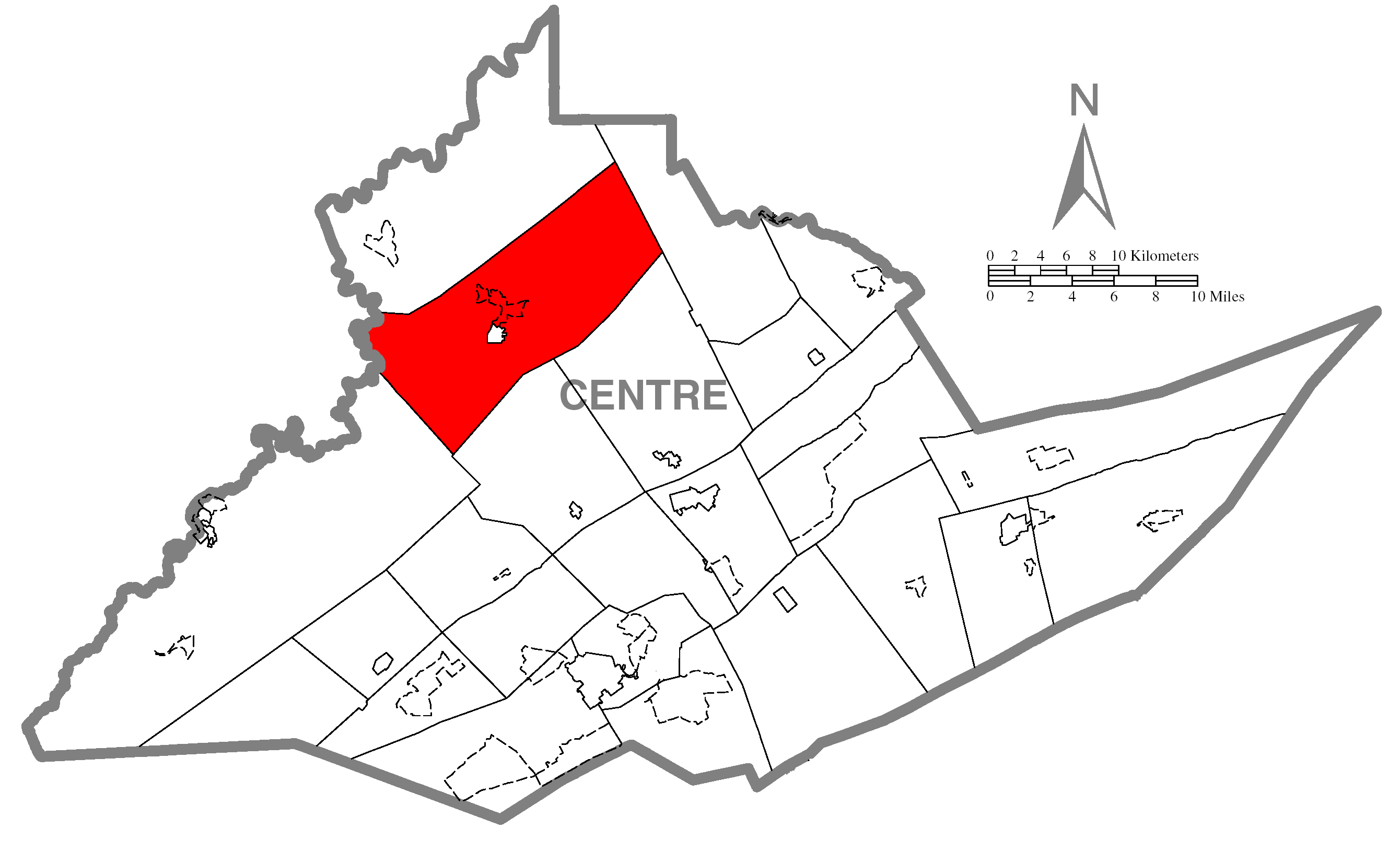
- Map of Centre County, Pennsylvania highlighting Snow Shoe Township

- Map of Centre County, Pennsylvania
- Country: United States
- State: Pennsylvania
- County: Centre
- Settled: 1818
- Incorporated: 1840

Area
  - Total: 84.01 sq mi (217.59 km^{2})
  - Land: 84.00 sq mi (217.56 km^{2})
  - Water: 0.012 sq mi (0.03 km^{2})

Population (2020)
  - Total: 1,638 ▼
  - Estimate (2021): 1,619
  - Density: 20.8/sq mi (8.04/km^{2})
- FIPS code: 42-027-71608
- Website: https://snowshoetwp.com/

Historical population
Census	Pop.	Note	%±
2000	1,760		—
2010	1,746		−0.8%
2020	1,638		−6.2%
2021 (est.)	1,619		−1.2%
U.S. Decennial Census

Snow Shoe Township is a township in Centre County, Pennsylvania, United States. It is part of the State College, Pennsylvania Metropolitan Statistical Area. The population was 1,638 at the 2020 census.

According to tradition, Snow Shoe was so named when a pair of snowshoes were found at an Indian village within the township's present borders.

== Geography ==
According to the United States Census Bureau, the township has a total area of 84.0 square miles (217.6 km^{2}), of which 0.012 square miles (0.03 km^{2}), or 0.02%, is water.

The township surrounds the borough of Snow Shoe (population 765). The township is bordered by Burnside Township to the northwest, Curtin Township to the northeast, Boggs and Union townships to the southeast, Rush Township to the southwest, and Clearfield County to the west.

Snow Shoe Township contains the census-designated places of Clarence and Moshannon.

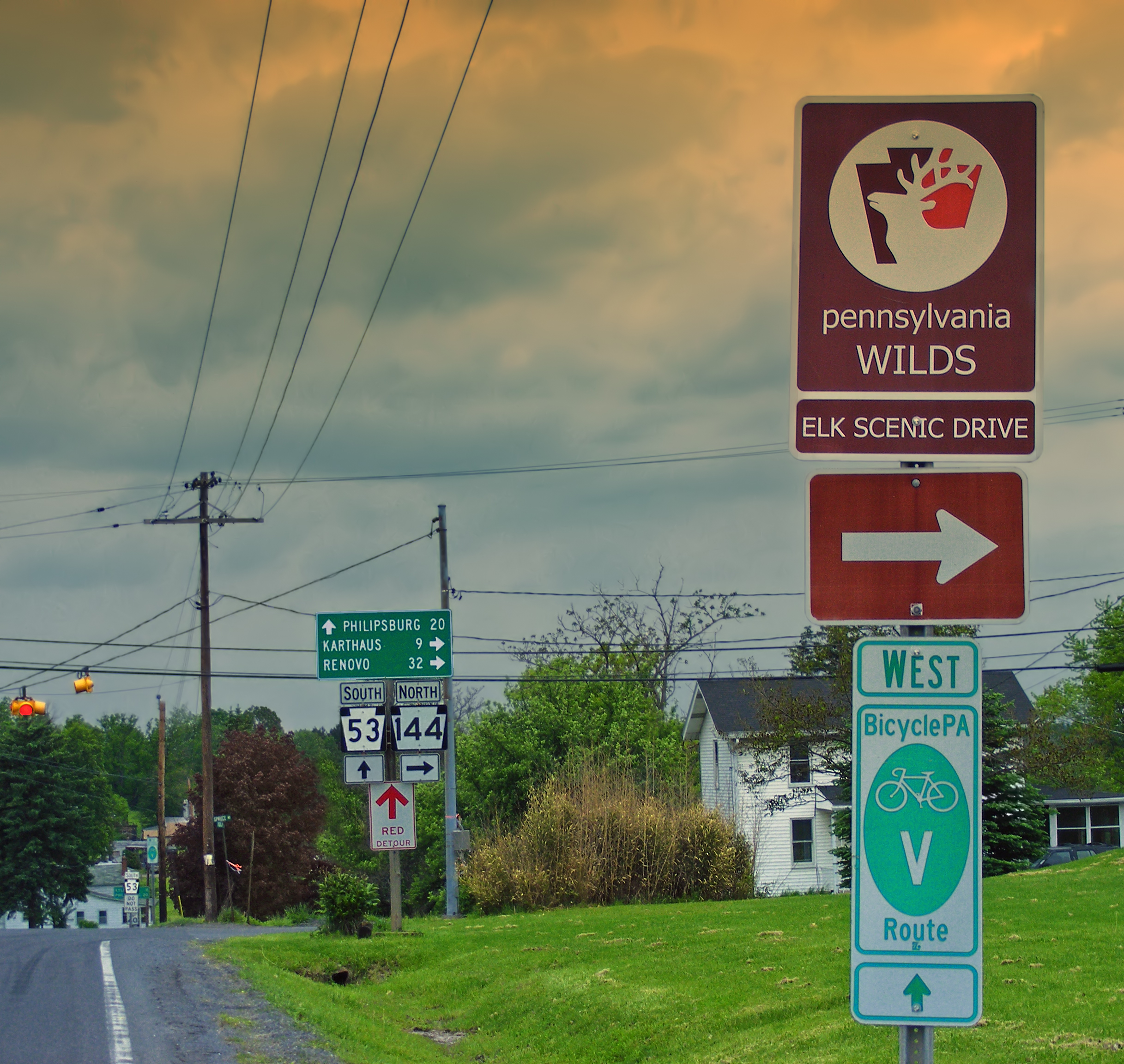
At the intersection of PA Routes 144 and 53 in Moshannon

== Demographics ==
As of the 2000 census, 1,760 people, 681 households, and 523 families resided in the township. The population density was 21.2 per square mile (8.2/km^{2}). There were 858 housing units at an average density of 10.3/sq mi (4.0/km^{2}). The racial makeup of the township was 99.38% White, 0.23% Native American, 0.17% Pacific Islander, and 0.23% from two or more races. Hispanic or Latino of any race were 0.51% of the population.

Households numbered 681, of which 30.7% had children under the age of 18 living with them, 61.4% were married couples living together, 10.1% had a female householder with no husband present, and 23.1% were non-families. 20.4% of all households were individuals, and 9.8% had someone living alone who was 65 years of age or older. Average household size was 2.58 and average family size was 2.98.

The township's population was distributed with 23.4% under the age of 18, 7.0% from 18 to 24, 27.8% from 25 to 44, 25.2% from 45 to 64, and 16.5% who were 65 years of age or older. The median age was 40 years. For every 100 females, there were 107.5 males. For every 100 females age 18 and over, there were 104.1 males.

Median income for a household in the township was $31,429, and for a family was $37,750. Males had a median income of $28,801 versus $21,806 for females. The per capita income for the township was $16,374. About 5.3% of families and 9.2% of the population were below the poverty line, including 9.3% of those under age 18 and 8.3% of those age 65 or over.
