= Frenchville, Pennsylvania =

Unincorporated community in Pennsylvania, US

- Unincorporated community Census designated place
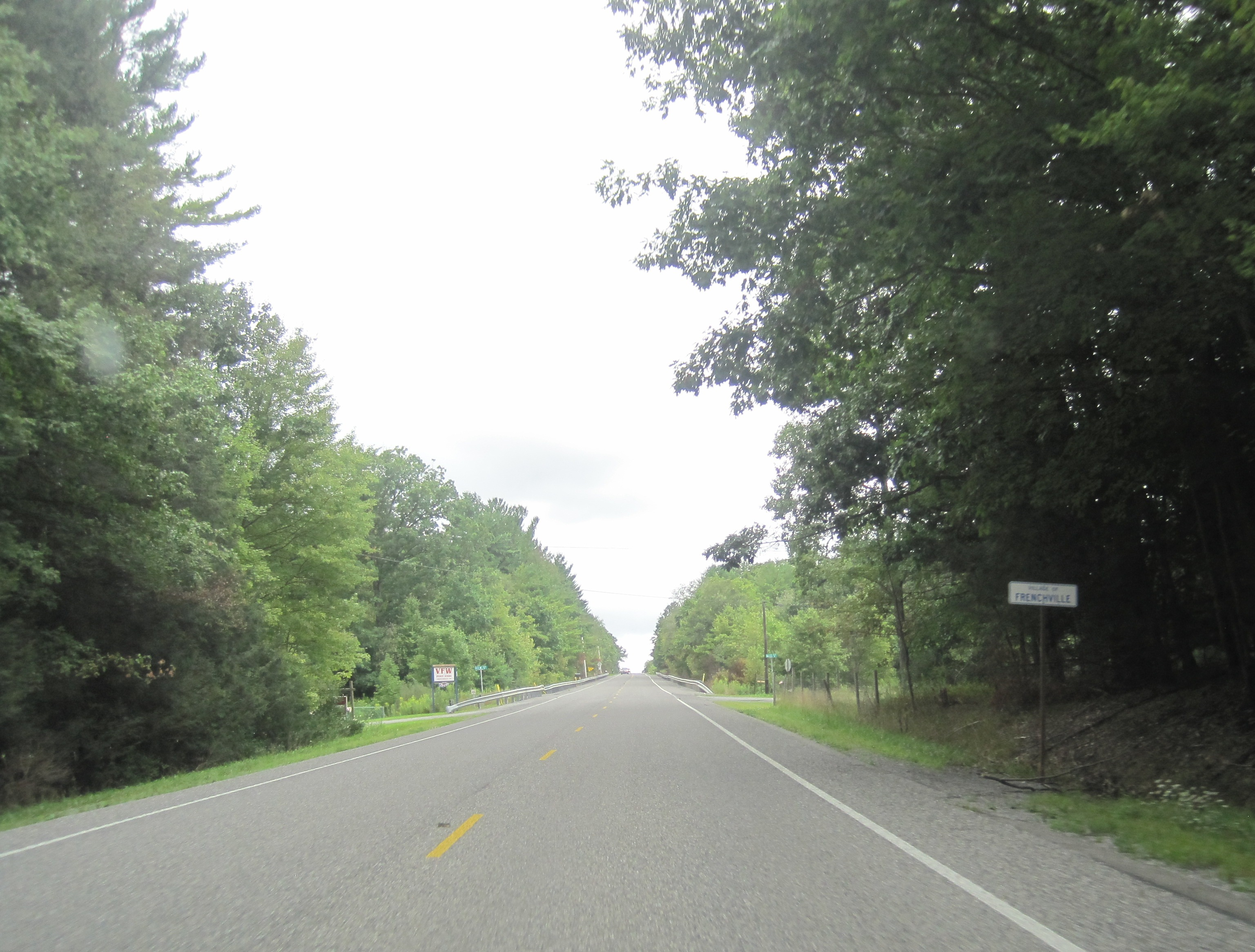
- PA 879 westbound passing around the south side of the village

- Location within Pennsylvania
- Coordinates: 41°06′17″N 78°13′12″W
- Country: United States
- State: Pennsylvania
- County: Clearfield
- Elevation: 1,401 ft (427 m)
- Time zone: UTC-5 (Eastern (EST))
  - Summer (DST): UTC-4 (EDT)
- ZIP code: 16836
- Area code: 814
- GNIS feature ID: 1175232

Frenchville (French: Ville Française) is an unincorporated community and census designated place (CDP) in Clearfield County, Pennsylvania, United States. The community is located along Pennsylvania Route 879, 12.7 miles (20.4 km) east-northeast of Clearfield. Frenchville has a post office with the ZIP code 16836, which opened on February 18, 1839. Frenchville was named for the French ancestry of its first settlers. In this community, developed Frenchville French, a unique dialect of the French language that was spoken in the area until the 1960s. The first white burial in the county (1771) was a French seaman, Tohas Auxe, who died en route from Canada to New Orleans. The stone was discovered on a local farm in 1896. The annual Frenchville Picnic is held at the St. Mary's Catholic Church since the 1870s.

== Demographics ==
Historical population
Census	Pop.	Note	%±

The United States Census Bureau defined Frenchville as a census designated place (CDP) in 2023.
