= Karthaus, Pennsylvania =

Unincorporated community in Pennsylvania, US

- Unincorporated community
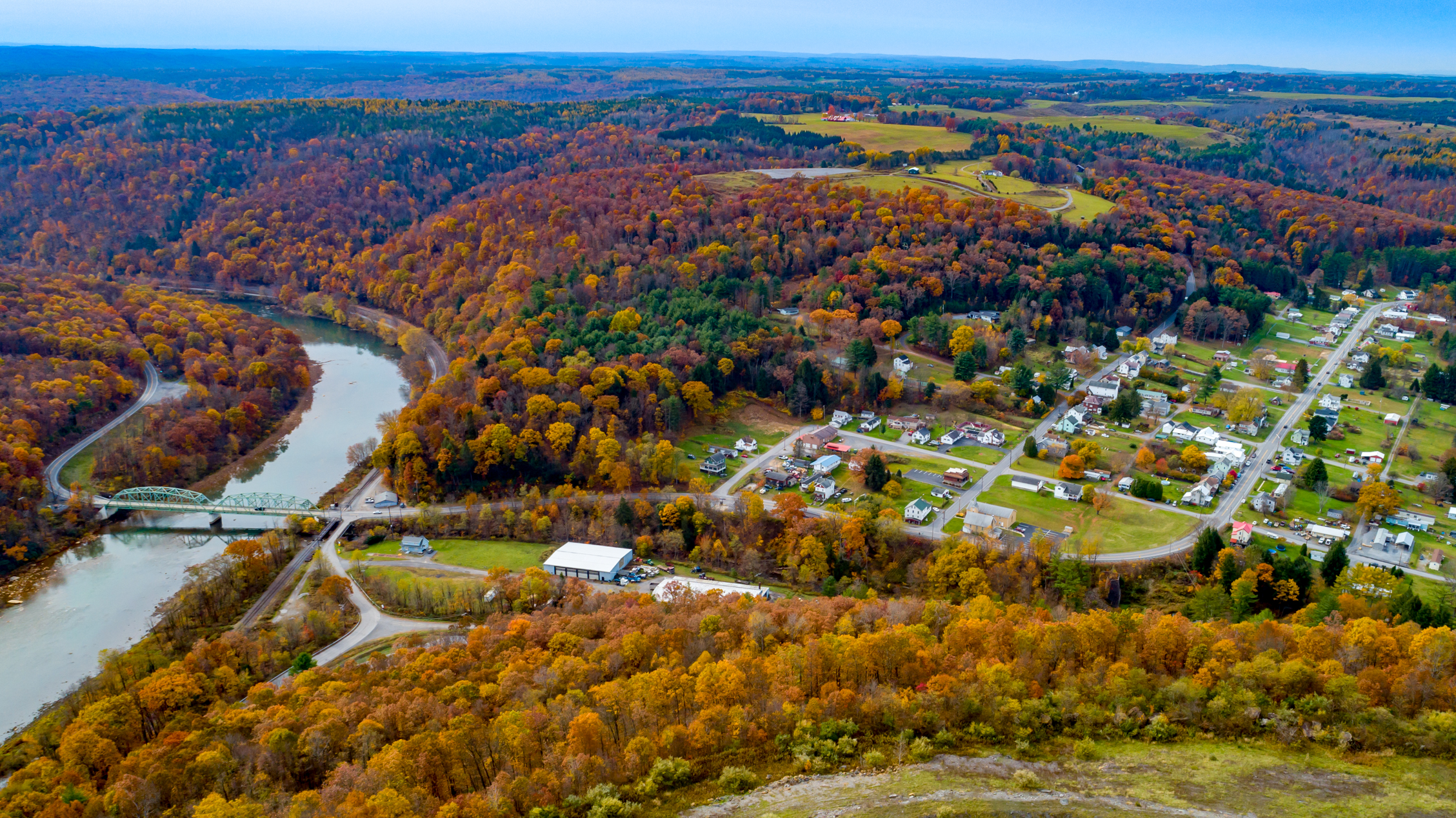
- Aerial photo of Karthaus in October 2019

- Location within Pennsylvania
- Coordinates: 41°07′15″N 78°06′50″W
- Country: United States
- State: Pennsylvania
- County: Clearfield
- Elevation: 912 ft (278 m)
- Time zone: UTC-5 (Eastern (EST))
  - Summer (DST): UTC-4 (EDT)
- ZIP code: 16845
- Area code: 814
- GNIS feature ID: 1178239

Karthaus is an unincorporated community in Clearfield County, Pennsylvania, United States. The community is located along Pennsylvania Route 879, 18.2 miles (29.3 km) east-northeast of Clearfield. Karthaus has a post office with ZIP code 16845, which opened on April 24, 1826. The community was named after Peter A. Karthaus, the proprietor of a local blast furnace.

== Demographics ==
Historical population
Census	Pop.	Note	%±

The United States Census Bureau defined Karthaus as a census designated place (CDP) in 2023.
