= Henry County Airport (Ohio) =

- IATA: none; ICAO: none; FAA LID: 7W5

Summary
- Airport type: Public
- Owner: Henry County Airport Authority
- Serves: Henry County, Ohio
- Location: Napoleon, Ohio
- Time zone: UTC−05:00 (-5)
  - Summer (DST): UTC−04:00 (-4)
- Elevation AMSL: 683 ft (208 m)
- Coordinates: 41°22′27″N 084°04′04″W
- Website: https://www.henrycountyohio.gov/167/Airport

Map
- Location of airport in Ohio 7W5 (the United States)

Runways
Direction	Length		Surface
Direction	ft	m	Surface
10/28	4,001	1,220	Asphalt

Statistics (2023)
- Aircraft operations (year ending 10/3/2023): 5,520
- Based aircraft: 15
- Source: Federal Aviation Administration

Henry County Airport (FAA LID: 7W5) is a public use airport located three nautical miles (6 km) east of the central business district of Napoleon, a city in Henry County, Ohio, United States. It is owned by the Henry County Airport Authority. This airport is included in the National Plan of Integrated Airport Systems for 2011–2015, which categorized it as a general aviation facility.

== History ==
Efforts to build a municipal airport for Napoleon had begun by mid February 1966, when arguments were being made in favor of such a facility. However, in April the county commissioners rejected a proposal to use land from the county for an airport.

Earlier efforts to build an airport had resulted in authority for the project devolved to the City of Napoleon. However, the availability of a state grant that required county involvement caused the latter to be brought back onboard the airport commission in February 1969. The state grant was approved in early April. A 60-acre (24 ha) parcel had been selected by mid April 1969 and a contractor selected late the following month. Construction had started by mid August and the final layer of pavement was being applied to the runway in mid November. The airport was completed by the end of the year, but was prevented from opening by a lawsuit brought by nearby property owners. They argued that the airport would hurt their property values and the injunction was not to be lifted until the airport commission purchased their land. After initially being ruled in the owners' favor, the decision was overturned in late July 1971 and the airport permitted to open. The airport and its 4,100 ft (1,200 m) was finally dedicated on 30 December 1974. By mid February 1975, the terminal building that was erected the year before was still largely empty.

A new airport manager was hired in 1978 after the existing manager refused a new contract. (Note: The fixed-base operator would be named Eagles Nest, Inc.) Two 250 ft (76 m) runway extensions were completed in 1979. By early February 1983, three hangars – including one 10-unit t-hangar – had been built.

S&P Aviation took over as the fixed-base operator in November 1991, but announced it would leave for the Fulton County Airport less than two years later. The company cited a lack of coordination with the county and a reduced budget as reasons for the move.

The airport received a federal grant in early July 2009 to replace runway approach lights.

In 2023, concerns over the airport's future were raised because much of the maintenance work at the airport is performed by volunteers.

== Facilities and aircraft ==
Henry County Airport covers an area of 47 acres (19 ha) at an elevation of 683 feet (208 m) above mean sea level. It has one runway designated 10/28 with an asphalt surface measuring 4,001 by 60 feet (1,220 x 18 m).

The airport has a fixed-base operator that sells fuel and offers services such as general maintenance and hangars as well as amenities like conference rooms, a crew lounge, pilot supplies, and more.

For the 12-month period ending October 3, 2023, the airport had 5,520 aircraft operations, an average of 106 per week: 100% general aviation, <1% air taxi, and <1% military. At that time there were 15 aircraft based at this airport: 14 single-engine, and 1 multi-engine.

== Accidents and incidents ==
- On 17 July 1997, a Cessna 120 crashed due to engine failure after taking off from the airport, injuring the pilot.
- On 22 June 1998, a Beechcraft Bonanza suffered a landing gear collapse while landing at the airport.
- On February 3, 2001, an Enstrom F28A helicopter was substantially damaged after the main rotor separated and it collided with terrain while on final approach to the Henry County Airport. The pilot said the purpose of the flight was to provide a sightseeing/orientation flight to the two passengers during an airport open house. According to the pilot, the helicopter developed an in-flight vibration just after takeoff. He returned to the airport, and the main rotor detached 10 feet above the ground. The probable cause of the accident was found to be the fatigue failure in the fillet radius of the mast, which resulted in the separation of the main rotor system.
- On April 21, 2018, a Taylorcraft BC12-65 was damaged during a runway excursion while landing at the Henry County Airport. The airplane was touching down when it ran off the runway and overturned.

== See also ==
- List of airports in Ohio
