= Quehanna Wild Area =

State-owned protected area in Pennsylvania, US

- IUCN category Ia (strict nature reserve)
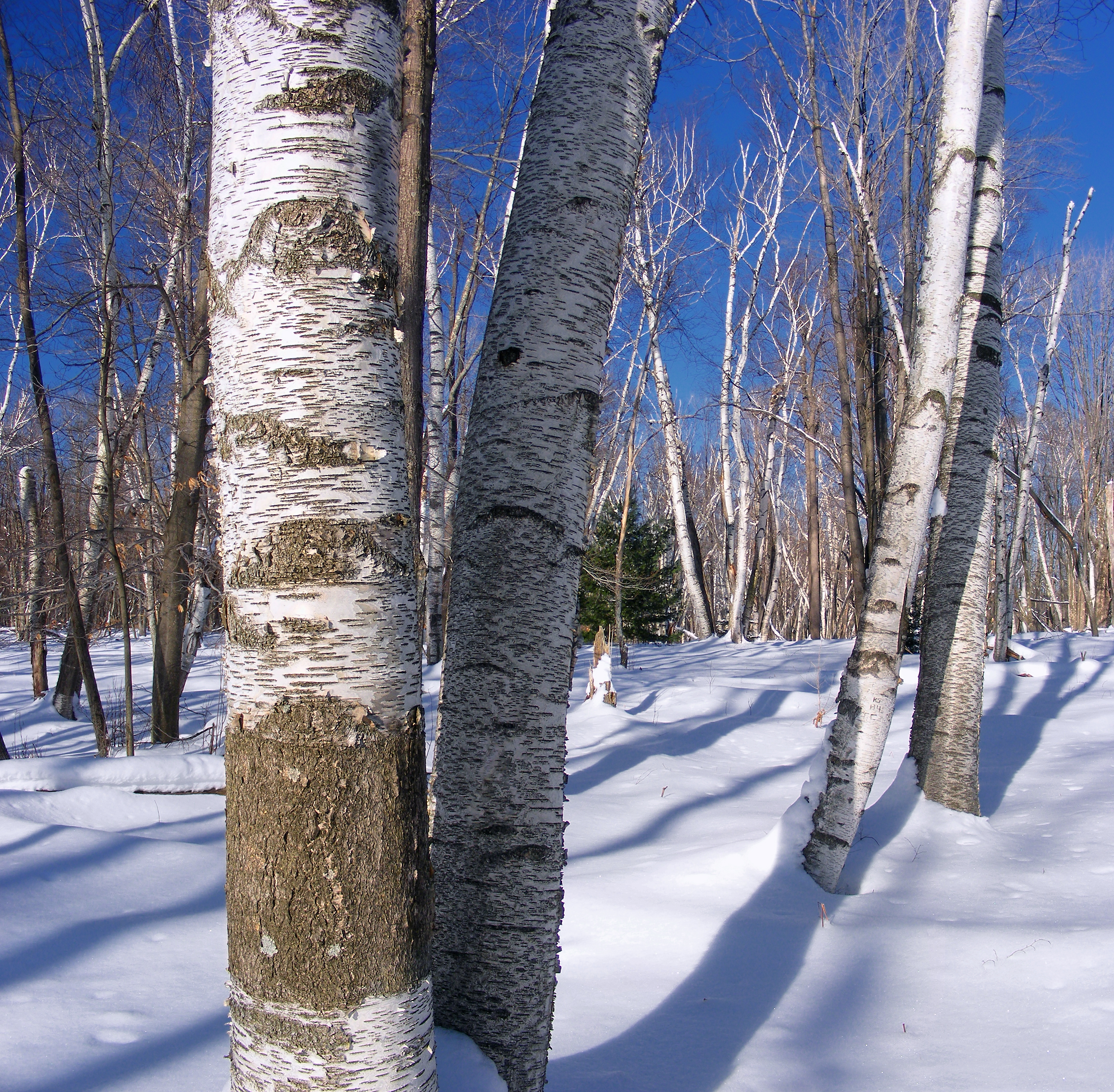
- White birches in Marion Brooks Natural Area within Quehanna Wild Area

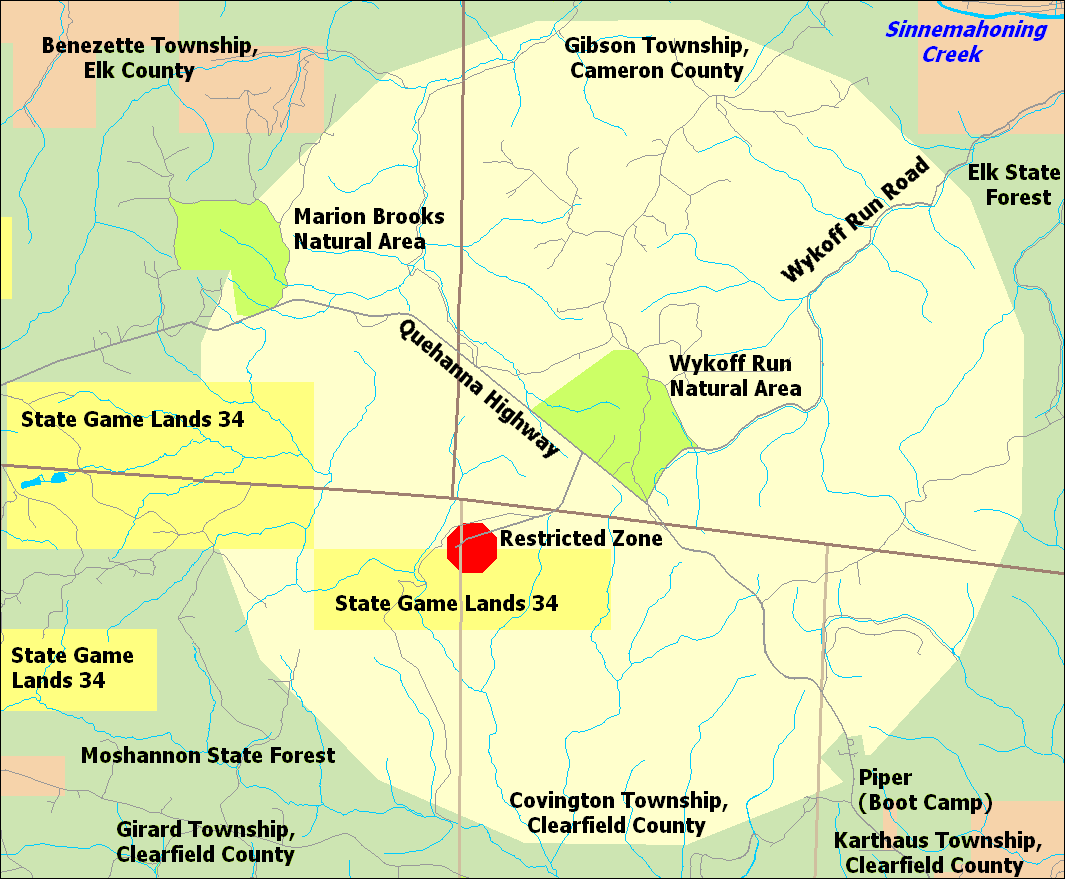
- Map of Quehanna Wild area (ivory), natural areas (lime green), state forests (green), state game lands (yellow), restricted area (red), and private land (brown)
- Location: Pennsylvania, United States
- Coordinates: 41°16′27″N 78°15′24″W
- Area: 50,000 acres (200 km^{2})
- Elevation: 1,896 ft (578 m)
- Established: 1965
- Named for: West Branch Susquehanna River
- Governing body: Pennsylvania Department of Conservation and Natural Resources
- Website: Quehanna Wild Area
- Location of Quehanna Wild Area in Pennsylvania

Quehanna Wild Area (/kwəˈhænə/) is a protected area within parts of Cameron, Clearfield and Elk counties in the U.S. state of Pennsylvania; with a total area of 50,000 acres (78 sq mi; 202 km^{2}), it covers parts of Elk and Moshannon State Forests. Founded in the 1950s as a nuclear research center, Quehanna has a legacy of radioactive and toxic waste contamination, while also being the largest state forest wild area in Pennsylvania, with herds of elk. The wild area is bisected by the Quehanna Highway and is home to second growth forest with mixed hardwoods and evergreens. Quehanna has two state forest natural areas: the 1,215-acre (492 ha) M.K. Goddard/Wykoff Run Natural Area, and the 917-acre (371 ha) Marion Brooks Natural Area. The latter has the largest stand of white birch in Pennsylvania and the eastern United States.

The land that became Quehanna Wild Area was home to Native Americans, including the Susquehannock and Iroquois, before it was purchased by the United States in 1784. Settlers soon moved into the region and, in the 19th and early 20th centuries, the logging industry cut the virgin forests; clearcutting and forest fires transformed the once verdant land into the "Pennsylvania Desert". Pennsylvania bought this land for its state forests, and in the 1930s the Civilian Conservation Corps worked to improve them. In 1955 the Curtiss-Wright Corporation bought 80 square miles (210 km^{2}) of state forest to focus on developing nuclear-powered jet engines. They named their facility Quehanna for the nearby West Branch Susquehanna River, itself named for the Susquehannocks.

Curtiss-Wright left in 1960, after which a succession of tenants further contaminated the nuclear reactor facility and its hot cells with radioactive isotopes, including strontium-90 and cobalt-60. The manufacture of radiation-treated hardwood flooring continued until 2002. Pennsylvania reacquired the land in 1963 and 1967, and in 1965 established Quehanna as a wild area, albeit one with a nuclear facility and industrial complex. The cleanup of the reactor and hot cells took over eight years and cost $30 million; the facility was demolished and its nuclear license terminated in 2009. Since 1992 the industrial complex has been home to Quehanna Motivational Boot Camp, a minimum-security prison, which will close in 2026. Quehanna Wild Area has many sites where radioactive and toxic waste was buried, some of which have been cleaned up while others were dug up by black bears and white-tailed deer.

In 1970 the name was officially changed to Quehanna Wild Area, and later that decade a portion of the 73.2-mile (117.8 km) Quehanna Trail was routed through the wild area. Primitive camping by hikers is allowed, but the area has no permanent residents. Several other trails are open to cross-country skiing in the winter, but closed to vehicles. Quehanna is on the Allegheny Plateau and was struck by a tornado in 1985. Defoliating insects have further damaged the forests. Quehanna Wild Area was named an Important Bird Area by the Pennsylvania Audubon Society, and is home to many species of birds and animals. Eco-tourists come to see the birds and elk, and hunters come for the elk, coyote, and other game.

== History ==
=== Native Americans ===
The Iroquoian-speaking Susquehannocks were the earliest recorded inhabitants of the West Branch Susquehanna River basin, which includes Quehanna Wild Area. They were a matriarchal society that lived in stockaded villages of large long houses. The Susquehannocks' numbers were greatly reduced by disease and warfare with the Five Nations of the Iroquois, and by 1675 they had died out, moved away, or been assimilated into other tribes. After this, the Iroquois exercised nominal control of the lands of the West Branch Susquehanna River valley. They also lived in long houses, primarily in what is now New York, and had a strong confederacy which gave them power beyond their numbers. To fill the void left by the demise of the Susquehannocks, the Iroquois encouraged such displaced eastern tribes as the Shawnee and Lenape (or Delaware) to settle in the West Branch watershed.

The Seneca tribe of the Iroquois hunted in much of Pennsylvania and the Quehanna area. The Iroquois and other tribes used the Great Shamokin Path, the major native east–west path connecting the Susquehanna and Allegheny River basins, which passed south of what is now the wild area. The native village of Chinklacamoose (or Chingleclamouche) was on this path at the West Branch Susquehanna River, at what is now Clearfield to the southwest of Quehanna. The Sinnemahoning Path along Sinnemahoning Creek ran north of Quehanna; as the path with the gentlest grade, it may have been the route the first Paleo-Indians took entering this part of Pennsylvania from the west.

The French and Indian War (1754–1763) and the subsequent colonial expansion encouraged the migration of many Native Americans westward to the Ohio River basin. In October 1784, the United States acquired a large tract of land, including what is now Quehanna Wild Area, from the Iroquois in the Second Treaty of Fort Stanwix; this acquisition is known as the Last Purchase, as it completed the series of purchases from the resident Native American tribes of lands within the boundaries of Pennsylvania, initiated by William Penn and continued by his heirs.

Although most of the Native Americans left this area of Pennsylvania, the state's Native American heritage can be found in many of its place names. The Susquehannocks were also known as the Susquehanna, from which the Susquehanna River and its West Branch obtained their names. In the 1950s the Curtiss-Wright Corporation coined the name "Quehanna" for its nuclear reservation, which it derived from the last three syllables of "Susquehanna", "in honor of the river that drained the entire region". Part of Quehanna Wild Area lies in the Moshannon State Forest, named for Moshannon Creek, which means "moose stream" or "elk stream" in the Lenape language. Sinnemahoning Creek's name means "stony salt lick" in Lenape.

=== Lumber era ===
Prior to the arrival of William Penn and his Quaker colonists in 1682, forests covered up to 90 percent of what is now Pennsylvania: more than 31,000 square miles (80,000 km^{2}) of eastern white pine, eastern hemlock, and a mix of hardwoods. Scull's 1770 map of the Province of Pennsylvania showed the colonists' ignorance of the land north of the West Branch Susquehanna River; Sinnemahoning Creek was missing, and the region that includes Quehanna was labeled "Buffaloe Swamp". This began to change when the land was purchased from the Iroquois in 1784, and became part of Northumberland County. In 1795 it became part of Lycoming County; as the new county was divided into more townships, Quehanna became part of Chingleclamouche Township (named for the native village). Chingleclamouche Township was included in Clearfield County when it was established in 1804. Later it was divided between at least three counties and many townships, and no longer exists under that name.

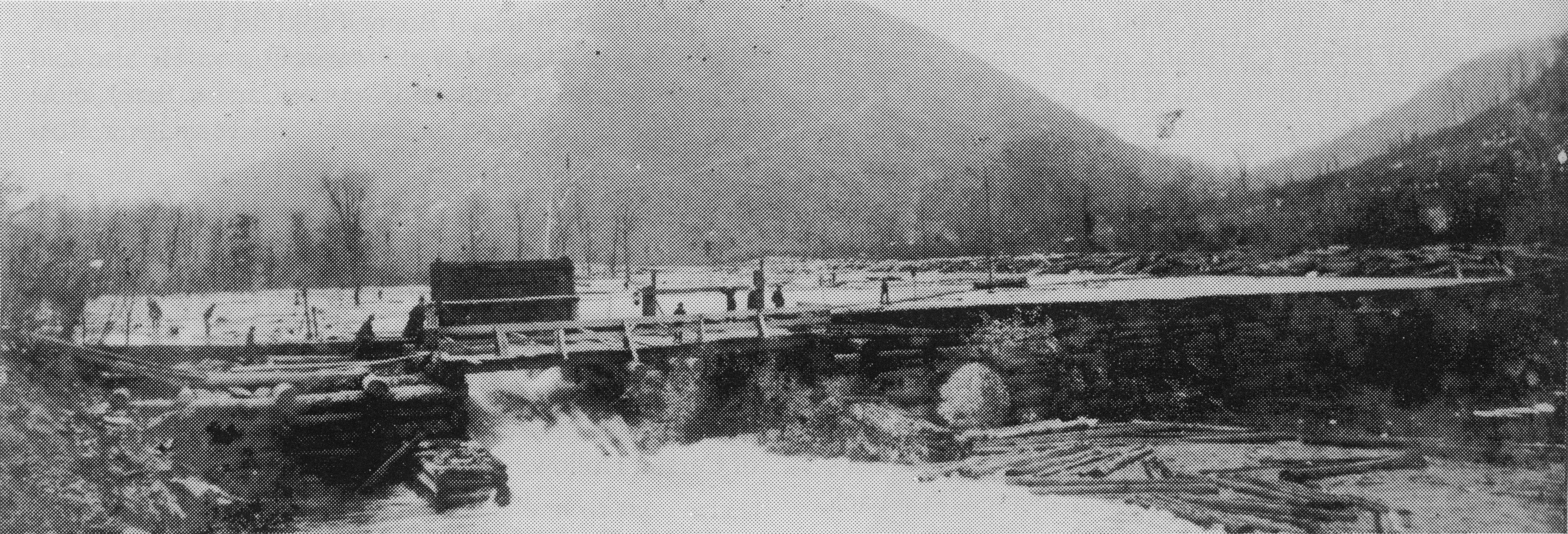
A splash dam discharging water and logs in the West Branch Susquehanna River basin

The southern part of Quehanna Wild Area is now in parts of Covington, Girard, and Karthaus townships in Clearfield County; they were incorporated in 1817, 1832, and 1841. The northwest part of Quehanna is in Benezette Township in Elk County, established in 1843. The northeast part of Quehanna is in Cameron County (incorporated in 1860) in Gibson Township, which was formed in 1804 while part of Clearfield County.

The first European American settlers arrived in Chingleclamouche Township in about 1793, and the first sawmill in Clearfield County began operating in 1805. Settlers initially occupied land along the river and creeks, as these provided a means of transportation. Some settlers would harvest timber and float it downstream once a year to make money for items they could not produce themselves, but by 1820 the first full-time lumbering operations began in the region. The white pine was the most sought after tree, yielding spars for ships and timber for buildings. Hardwoods were also harvested, and eventually hemlocks were cut for their wood and their bark, which contained tannins used in tanning leather.

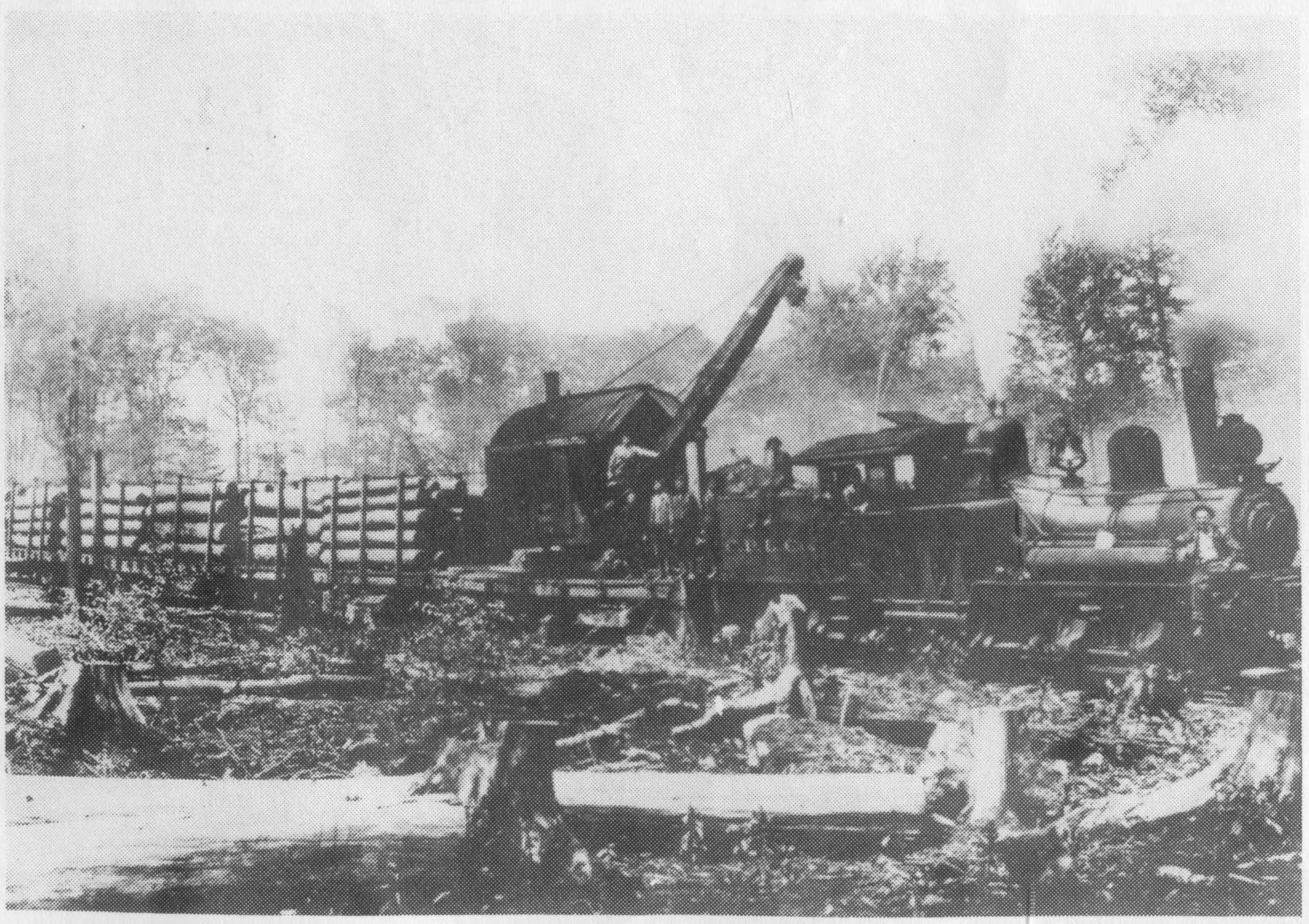
A logging train of the Central Pennsylvania Lumber Co., which clearcut the Quehanna plateau from 1907 to 1911

As lumber became an industry in Pennsylvania, the rivers and creeks were declared public highways by the Pennsylvania General Assembly. This permitted their use to float logs to sawmills and markets. Log booms were placed on the West Branch Susquehanna River to catch the floating timber; Lock Haven built a boom in 1849, and Williamsport's Susquehanna Boom opened in 1851. Businesses purchased vast tracts of land and built splash dams on the creeks; these dams controlled water in small streams that would otherwise be unable to carry logs and rafts. For example, in 1871 a single splash dam on the Bennett Branch of Sinnemahoning Creek could release enough water to produce a wave 2 feet (0.6 m) high on the main stem for two hours. Mosquito Creek, which drains much of the southern part of Quehanna Wild Area, had at least nine splash dams in its watershed. This was the predominant lumber transport system in the Quehanna region from 1865 to 1885 and after 1850, five different kinds of lumber rafts could be found on its streams and river.

Much of the timber was too remote to be transported via the streams, and logging railroads were the next development in the Quehanna lumber era. In or around 1880, these railroads allowed the clearcutting of the remaining forests. The Quehanna plateau was unusual in using standard gauge track for its logging railroads: most such railways were narrow gauge. The logging railroads used special geared steam locomotives, such as the Shay, Climax and Heisler. Nine companies operated logging railroads in what became Moshannon State Forest; the Goodyear Lumber Company was the largest and cut much of what became Quehanna Wild Area between 1902 and 1912. The Central Pennsylvania Lumber Company logged land in the northern part of the wild area between 1907 and 1911.

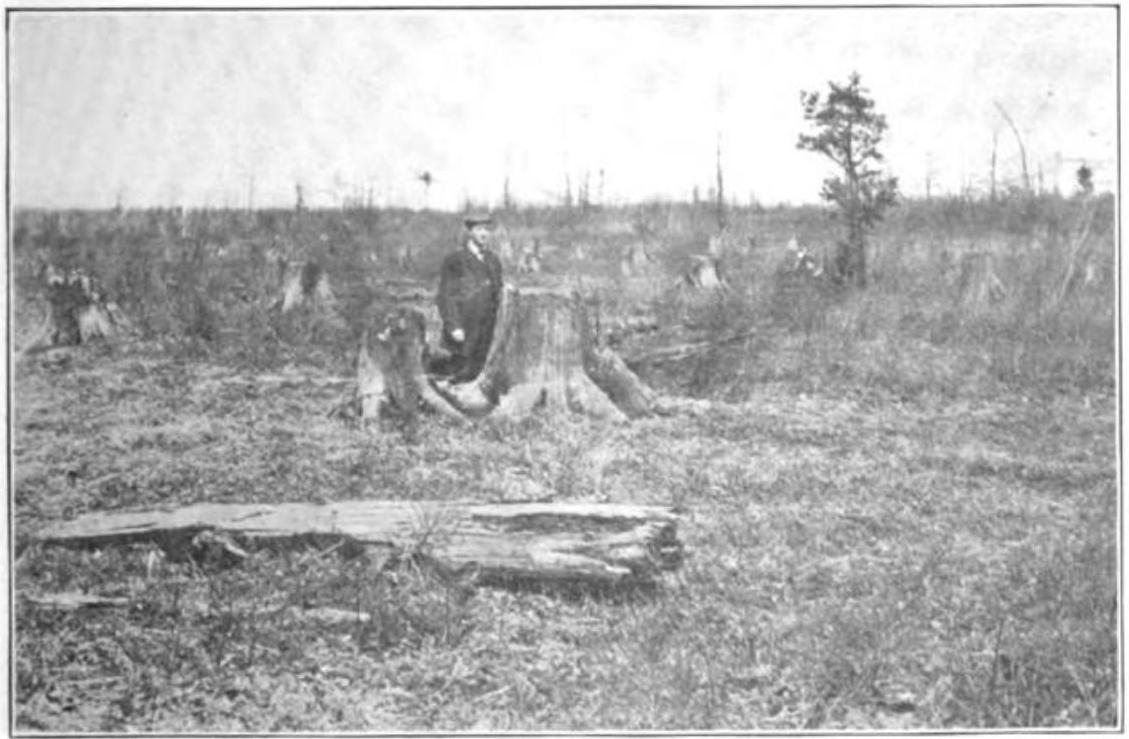
Clearcutting led to the "Pennsylvania Desert".

There were only two major roads on the Quehanna plateau in the 19th and early 20th centuries, both originally turnpikes. The Caledonia Pike ran east–west from Bellefonte to Smethport, and passed south of what became the wild area, while the Driftwood Pike ran from near Karthaus north to Driftwood on the Sinnemahoning, and passed through the wild area. Wagon trains and railroads brought supplies to the lumber camps in the woods; some wood hicks set up small farms on cleared land that also provided food. There were at least eight farms in Quehanna, though they were not very productive because of "poorly drained acid soil and a short growing season".

The lumber era in Quehanna did not last; the old-growth and second-growth forests were clearcut by the early 20th century. Fire had always been a hazard; the sparks from logging steam engines started many wildfires, and more wood may have been lost to fires than to logging in some areas. On the clearcut land nothing remained except the discarded, dried-out tree tops, which were very flammable; much of the land burned and was left barren. The soil was depleted of nutrients, fires baked the ground hard, and jungles of blueberries, blackberries, and mountain laurel covered the clearcut land, which became known as the "Pennsylvania Desert".

=== State forests ===
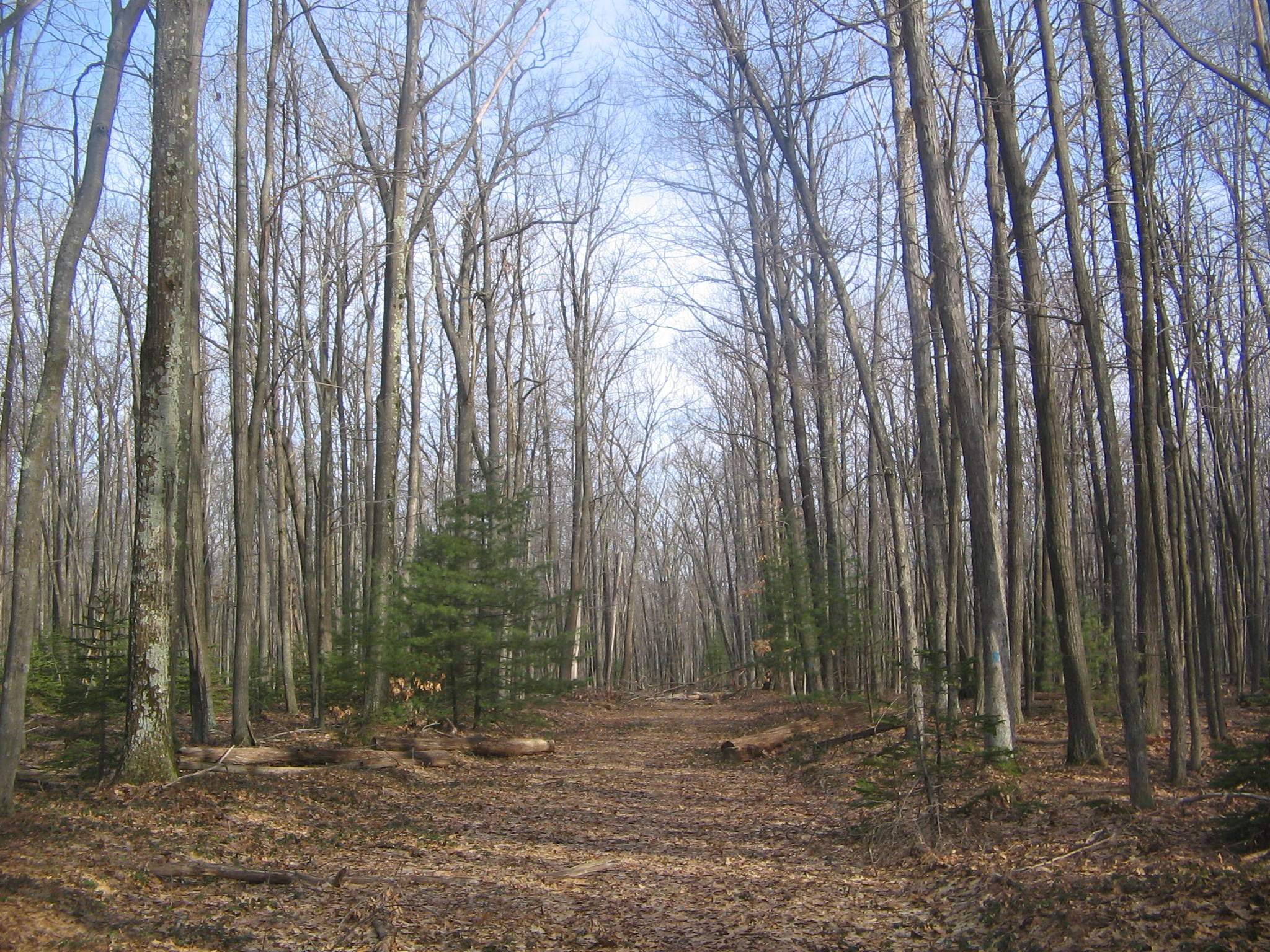
Old Hoover Road, a hiking trail in M.K. Goddard/Wykoff Run Natural Area, was originally the Driftwood Pike, then a state forest road.

As the timber was exhausted and the land burned, many companies abandoned their holdings. Conservationists such as Joseph Rothrock became concerned that the forests would not regrow without proper management. They called for a change in the philosophy of forest management and for the state to purchase land from the lumber companies. In 1895, Rothrock was appointed the first forestry commissioner in what became the Pennsylvania Department of Forests and Waters, the forerunner of today's Department of Conservation and Natural Resources (DCNR). In 1897, the Pennsylvania General Assembly passed legislation that authorized the purchase of "unseated lands for forest reservations", and the first of the Pennsylvania state forest lands were acquired the following year.

The state first bought land that became the Moshannon State Forest in 1898; the second purchase, and first in the Quehanna region, was 3,263 acres (1,320 ha) in the Three Runs area, acquired for $1 an acre ($2.47 a hectare) in 1900. Three smaller state forests (Karthaus, Sinnemahoning, and Moshannon) were merged to form the present Moshannon State Forest; in 1997, the forest covered 131,622 acres (53,266 ha). The first purchase for the Elk State Forest was made in 1900, and by 1997 it encompassed 197,729 acres (80,018 ha). Forty-six percent, or 22,179 acres (8,976 ha), of the total 48,186 acres (19,500 ha) of Quehanna Wild Area lies in the Elk State Forest. The remainder lies in the Moshannon State Forest.

The state established a tree nursery in the Moshannon State Forest in 1911, which became the largest in Pennsylvania before it closed in 1980. In addition to planting millions of trees, in 1913 the state encouraged use of state forest lands by allowing permanent leases for camp sites; when the state stopped issuing new permits in 1970, 4,500 campsites had been leased. The Pennsylvania Game Commission began purchasing land for state game preserves in 1920, and by 1941, State Game Lands 34, which is partly in Quehanna Wild Area, had been established. Despite these conservation efforts, major forest fires swept the Moshannon and Elk state forests in 1912, 1913, 1926, and 1930, and minor fires occurred in other years.

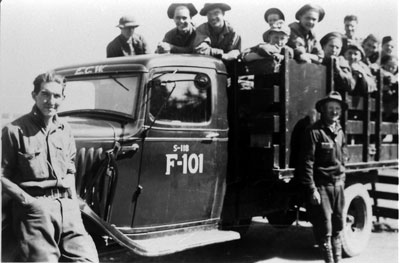
Men of Civilian Conservation Corps Camp S118, who worked in the Quehanna area

During the Great Depression, the Civilian Conservation Corps (CCC) established ten camps in Moshannon State Forest, and ten in Elk State Forest. The young men of the CCC planted trees, blazed new trails, built roads and bridges, and fought fires, which continued to be a problem. In 1938 a fast-moving fire in the Elk State Forest, north of Quehanna, killed eight firefighters. The CCC also built structures and established or improved many of the state parks, including Parker Dam and S. B. Elliott State Parks on the western Quehanna plateau. The United States' entry into World War II ended the CCC, and all its camps were closed by the summer of 1942. The Quehanna Trail passes near or through the sites of several former CCC camps.

Other Depression-era public works projects shaped the area. The Works Progress Administration (WPA) had at least two camps for World War I veterans in the Quehanna area, and built the Karthaus emergency landing field for airmail planes, similar to those that became Mid-State Regional Airport and Cherry Springs Airport. The 3,700-by-1,800-foot (1,100 by 550 m) airfield was built in 1935 and 1936 along Hoover Road (the old Driftwood Pike), just north of what is now M.K. Goddard/Wykoff Run Natural Area. During World War II, the landing strip was blocked to prevent enemy planes from secretly landing there.

In 1946 the Mosquito Creek Sportsmen's Association was founded to promote conservation in the region. One of the association's initial concerns was the acidification of streams, which they originally attributed to tannic acid from the trees used by the beavers to construct their dams. With the assistance of Pennsylvania's Department of Forests and Waters, Game Commission, and Fish and Boat Commission, they dynamited 79 dams. Afterward, they discovered the water was acidic upstream of the dams too, and eventually realized that the problem was caused by acid rain, not the beavers. The association has operated several stations to reduce the acidity of Mosquito Creek and its tributaries, with technical assistance from the Pennsylvania State University (Penn State).

=== Atoms for Peace ===
The pool reactor in Curtiss-Wright's research facility. The nuclear core is in the water, and the control panel is on the bridge.

In a December 8, 1953 speech to the United Nations, President Dwight D. Eisenhower announced a new Atoms for Peace policy, and Congress enacted his program into law the following year. Atoms for Peace "made funding accessible to anyone who had the imagination, if not the ability, to harness the atom's power for peaceful purposes". Under the new program, the airplane manufacturer Curtiss-Wright Corporation sought a large isolated area in central Pennsylvania "for the development of nuclear-powered jet engines and to conduct research in nucleonics, metallurgy, ultrasonics, electronics, chemicals and plastics". Curtiss-Wright worked closely with the state, and in June 1955, Governor George M. Leader signed legislation that authorized the construction of a research facility at Quehanna. The Commonwealth of Pennsylvania sold Curtiss-Wright 8,597 acres (3,479 ha) for $181,250 ($22.50 an acre, $55.60 a hectare), and gave the company a 99-year lease on the remaining 42,596 acres (17,238 ha) at $30,000 a year. Curtiss-Wright controlled 51,193 acres (80.0 sq mi; 207.2 km^{2}) in a regular 16-sided polygon, which was easier to fence than a circular area.

The state constructed $1.6 million of roads to the area; the Quehanna Highway was built on parts of an old CCC road, which followed an earlier logging railroad grade. Pennsylvania also canceled 212 camp site leases to help ensure security for the installation. Curtiss-Wright built three facilities on its land. The first was a nuclear research center with a nuclear reactor and six shielded radiation containment chambers for handling radioactive isotopes, referred to as hot cells, at the end of Reactor Road. The second was for jet engine trials, and had two test cells with bunkers just north of Quehanna Highway, about 0.5 miles (0.8 km) apart. The northern test cell was at the center of the 16-sided polygon; even if a jet engine broke its moorings, it could not leave the polygonal area. Both of these were on the land which Curtiss-Wright had purchased, which was a regular octagon surrounded with a 24-mile (39 km) fence built by forest rangers, supervised from three guard houses on Quehanna Highway and Wykoff Run Road. The third installation was an industrial complex at the southeast edge of the polygon, in Karthaus Township, on the Quehanna Highway. At this site, a Curtiss-Wright division manufactured Curon foam for furniture and household products and used beryllium oxide to make high-temperature ceramics for application in the nuclear industry.

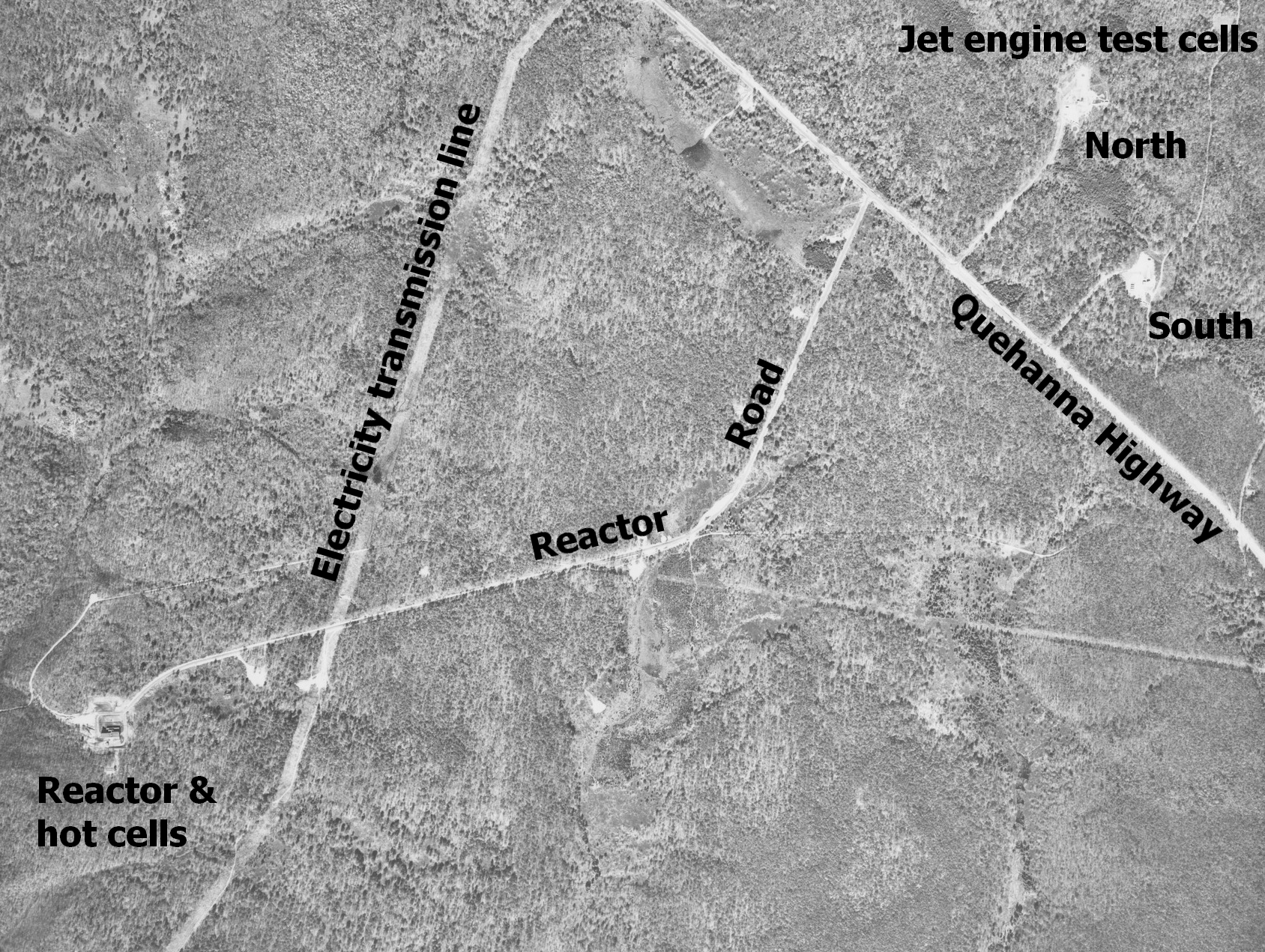
1958 aerial view of the reactor and jet engine test cells

In 1956 Curtiss-Wright began isotope work at the facility, and The New York Times published two stories on the new nuclear research laboratory that year, followed by a November 1957 report that the one-megawatt nuclear reactor was completed. In 1958, the corporation received a twenty-year license from the Atomic Energy Commission (AEC) to operate a four-megawatt open pool nuclear research reactor, and received permission from the Pennsylvania Sanitary Water Board to dispose of some radioactive waste in Meeker Run, a tributary of Mosquito Creek. The project was billed as "the greatest thing that ever happened in North Central Pennsylvania", and was expected to employ between 7,000 and 8,000 people. Curtiss-Wright spent $30 million on the project, and developed a community for its scientific and technical staff at the village of Pine Glen, southeast of Karthaus in Centre County.

By 1960 the Air Force had decided not to pursue nuclear-powered aircraft, and the federal government canceled $70 million in "high-altitude testing contracts" with Curtiss-Wright. By June 1960, the reactor was on standby and only 750 employees remained, 400 of whom were in the Curon foam division; many engineers and scientists had already left. On August 20, 1960, Curtiss-Wright announced that it was donating the reactor facility to Penn State and selling its Curon foam division; the remaining 235 employees lost their jobs. Penn State, located about an hour south of Quehanna, had its own nuclear reactor, but intended to use the Quehanna facility for research and training.

The Curtis-Wright reactor was dismantled and its fuel returned to the AEC. Martin Company, which soon became Martin Marietta, leased the hot cells, intending to use them in the manufacture of small radioisotope thermoelectric generators. Curtiss-Wright warned Penn State "that the radiation involved in Martin's operations would be 'extremely high' and of a type that posed a particular risk to human health", but Curtiss-Wright itself had left both solid and liquid radioactive waste in the facility. Some of the Curtiss-Wright waste was contaminated with toxic beryllium oxide. Penn State had acquired the reactor license, and with it came legal responsibility for the nuclear waste on the site; its plan with the AEC called for the release of 90 percent of the liquid radioactive waste into the environment and the burial of most radioactive solids on site. Items coated with beryllium oxide dust "were covered in plastic and buried out in the woods", where some were unearthed by black bears and white-tailed deer. Once jet engine testing stopped, the bunkers at the test cells were used "to store hazardous and explosive material".

The hot cells in the facility were used to remotely handle materials too radioactive to deal with directly.

In 1962 Martin Marietta began to manufacture Systems for Nuclear Auxiliary Power (SNAP) thermoelectric generators under a contract with the AEC; their AEC license allowed them to have up to 6 million curies of radioactive strontium-90 in the form of strontium titanate, which powered the SNAP generators. A SNAP-7 reactor made at Quehanna was used in the world's first nuclear-powered lighthouse, the Baltimore Harbor Light, from May 1964 to April 1966. In early 1963, Curtiss-Wright still owned or leased all of Quehanna and sublet land along Quehanna Highway to a firm that recovered copper from wire by burning off its insulation, a procedure that contaminated the soil. On July 12, 1963, Governor William Scranton announced the termination of Curtiss-Wright's lease on 42,596 acres (17,238 ha); the state paid the company for the roads it had built, and Curtiss-Wright donated six of the eight buildings in the industrial complex to the state. In 1965 the state legislature passed an act declaring the former leased area a wilderness area, and Maurice K. Goddard, secretary of the Department of Forests and Waters, named it the Quehanna Wilderness Area.

Although Martin Marietta completed its AEC contract and its lease expired on December 21, 1966, it had to stay at the reactor site "until radiation contamination was brought to acceptable levels". Martin Marietta partially decontaminated the site, and in April 1967 undertook a joint radiological survey with Penn State and the AEC. The survey found "licensable [sic] quantities of strontium-90 stayed behind as structural contamination and residual radioactivity in piping and tanks, estimated at about 0.2 curies". This met the standards for that day, although Penn State did raise questions about the contamination remaining. Strontium is chemically very similar to calcium (both are alkaline earth metals) and can be absorbed by the body, where it is chiefly incorporated into bones. Strontium-90 decays by beta decay and has a half-life of 29 years; when it is in the body, its radioactivity can lead to bone cancer and leukemia.

Many in the conservation movement urged the state to buy back the land, especially after the Curtiss-Wright lease was canceled. In April 1967 Penn State vacated the site and gave the reactor complex to the state. Martin Marietta departed in June 1967, and early in that same year, Pennsylvania bought the remaining land back from Curtiss-Wright for $992,500, about $811,000 more than they had sold it for in 1955. Various usage plans for the area were proposed, including: a vacation resort with a large artificial lake, motels, golf courses, and honeymoon resort; a Penn State game preserve stocked with exotic animals like bison and boar; a large youth camp for several hundred children; and a radioactive waste disposal site. By November 1967, all of the land was back in the state forests and state game lands.

=== Protected area and reclamation ===
==== Reactor facility ====
In 1967, Pennsylvania leased the reactor complex to the Nuclear Materials and Equipment Corporation (NUMEC), which already had a federal license to work with nuclear materials. NUMEC, which soon became a subsidiary of Atlantic-Richfield Corporation (ARCO), set up a large irradiator in what had been the reactor pool. The irradiator contained over 1 million curies of cobalt-60 to produce intense gamma rays, which were used to sterilize medical equipment and irradiate food and wood. In the spring of 1967 the state had concluded that radiation contamination at the Quehanna site "could never be completely cleaned up", and so was glad to find a tenant with nuclear experience.

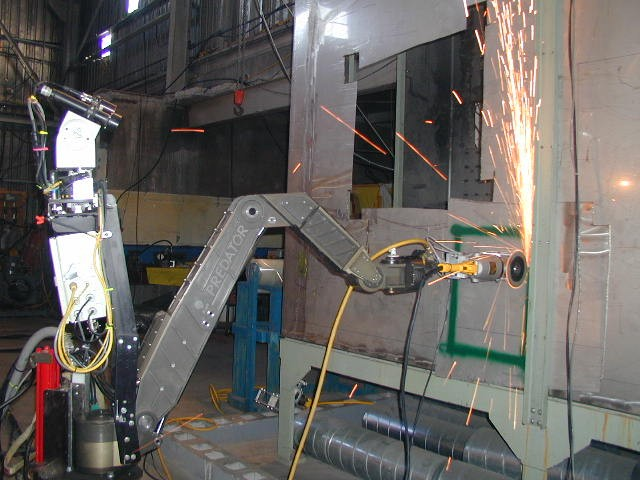
The robot which disassembled the most contaminated parts of the facility in action

A group of NUMEC employees discovered that irradiating hardwood treated with plastics produced very durable flooring. In 1978 they formed PermaGrain Products, Inc. as a separate company from ARCO, and purchased the rights to the process as well as "the main irradiator, a smaller shielded irradiator and related equipment". PermaGrain sold the flooring for use in basketball courts and gymnasiums, and was the longest occupant of the Quehanna facility, operating there from 1978 to December 2002. PermaGrain also let Neutron Products, Inc., a Maryland company, do cobalt-60 work in its hot cells, which required an amendment of their license from the Nuclear Regulatory Commission (NRC, the successor to the AEC).

In 1993, strontium-90 contamination in the reactor facility led the NRC to require PermaGrain to begin decontamination work, and the Pennsylvania DEP commissioned a "site characterization study". In 1998, a firm named NES began the cleanup work; they changed their name to Scientech in 1999 and to EnergySolutions in 2006. The cleanup was originally estimated to take six months; by 2006 it had taken 8 years and cost $30 million. According to the Pennsylvania Department of Environmental Protection's (DEP) Bureau of Radiation Protection: "Inadequate characterization of the site and the presence of ongoing industrial operations resulted in many project delays and increased costs." The hot cells proved to have more radioactive sources than originally thought. In October 1998 a Scientech worker doing decontamination cut a tube in hot cell number 4, which accidentally released strontium-90 into PermaGrain's work area. As a result, a robot had to be constructed to remove 3,000 curies of cobalt-60 in two of the hot cells, dismantle cell 4, and decontaminate the rest remotely.

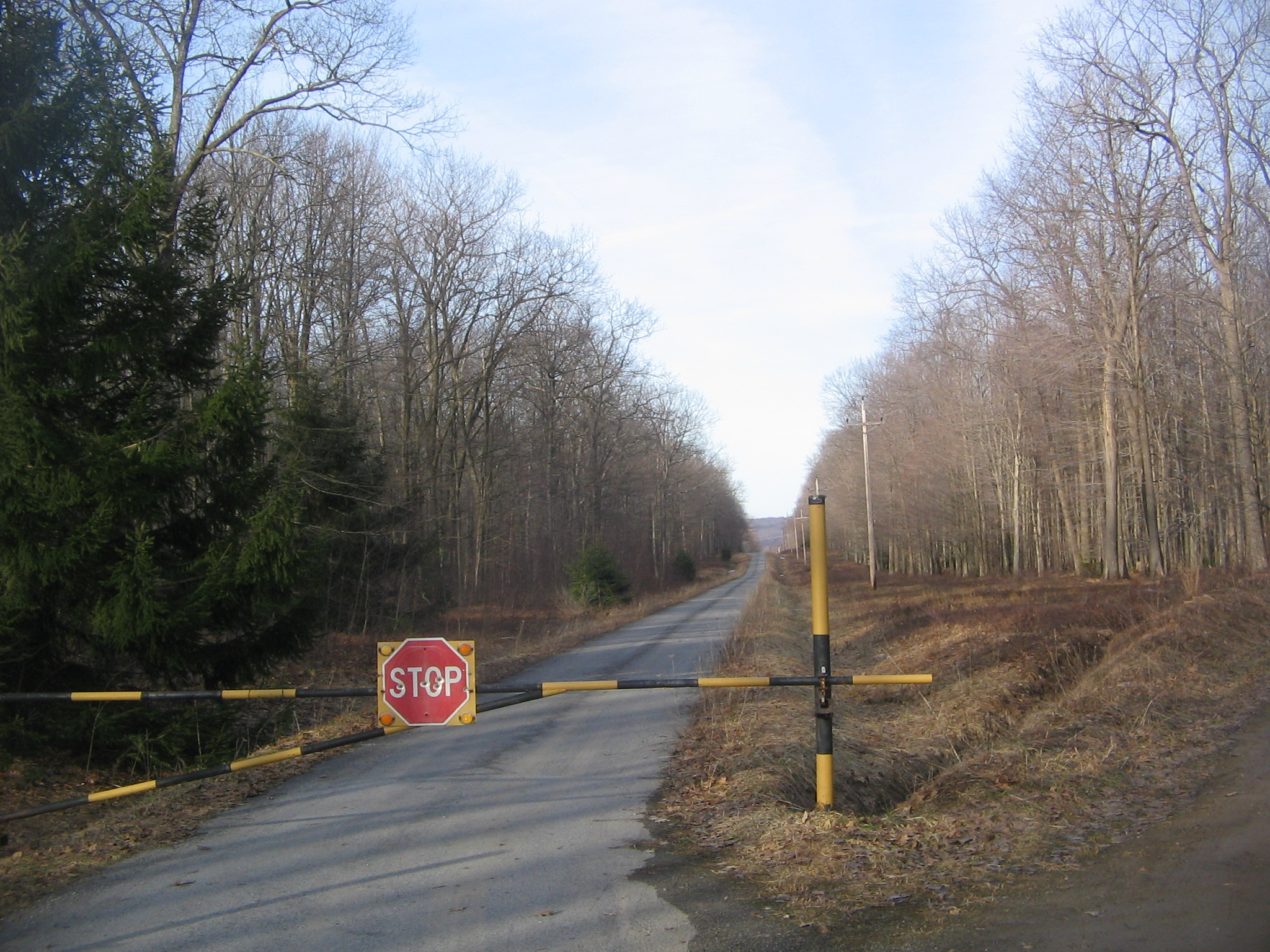
Reactor Road in 2010; even though the reactor has been demolished, access to the site by vehicles is still restricted.

After the accidental release, another radiological survey was performed, and the state government concluded that PermaGrain needed to be relocated. The DCNR made the policy decision that Quehanna Wild Area would be closed to industrial uses. After looking at multiple sites with Clearfield County development authorities, a new site for PermaGrain Products was purchased, and the company submitted its plans for a new building and license to the NRC in October 2001. In order to approve the move to the new site, the NRC required PermaGrain to provide an inventory of all their cobalt-60 sources, dispose of a damaged source, and dispose of any other sources not mechanically certified. However in late December 2002, PermaGrain filed for bankruptcy under Chapter Seven. PermaGrain had employed 135 people in 1988 and 80 in 1995.

When PermaGrain went bankrupt, about 100,000 curies of cobalt-60 were abandoned at the reactor facility, which was now under the control of Pennsylvania's government. The DEP assumed responsibility for the NRC license and legacy contamination. The United States Environmental Protection Agency (EPA), working with the NRC and state, removed the cobalt-60 from the site for disposal at the low-level radioactive waste facility in Barnwell, South Carolina in September 2003. Scientech continued decontamination work and demolished the hot cells; much of this work was done robotically, with financial aid from the Department of Energy.

The cleanup was thought finished, so a final survey was done in December 2004, and a Final Status Survey Report was filed in February 2005. However, when the NRC and scientists from the Oak Ridge Institute for Science and Education surveyed the facility in May 2005, they found many areas of contamination above the legal limits. According to the NRC's Quehanna Site Status Summary, strontium-90 had contaminated the "buildings as well as ... surface and subsurface soil" but was not in groundwater. More cleanup work was done in the summer of 2005, but the site still did not meet NRC regulations. DEP concluded that "some type of migration of radioactive material [was] taking place in the concrete at the facility", and changed its disposal plan. The new plan called for demolition of the building without completing decontamination, and disposal of the above ground material in a regular landfill. This plan was approved by the NRC in October 2006, and a December 2006 survey showed "that the above grade structure met the release limits" of the disposal plan. The former reactor structure was demolished, and on May 13, 2009 the NRC released the state from its license for the site. As of 2011, a small octagonal "restricted area" around the reactor site is still shown on official DCNR maps.

==== Contamination and cleanup ====
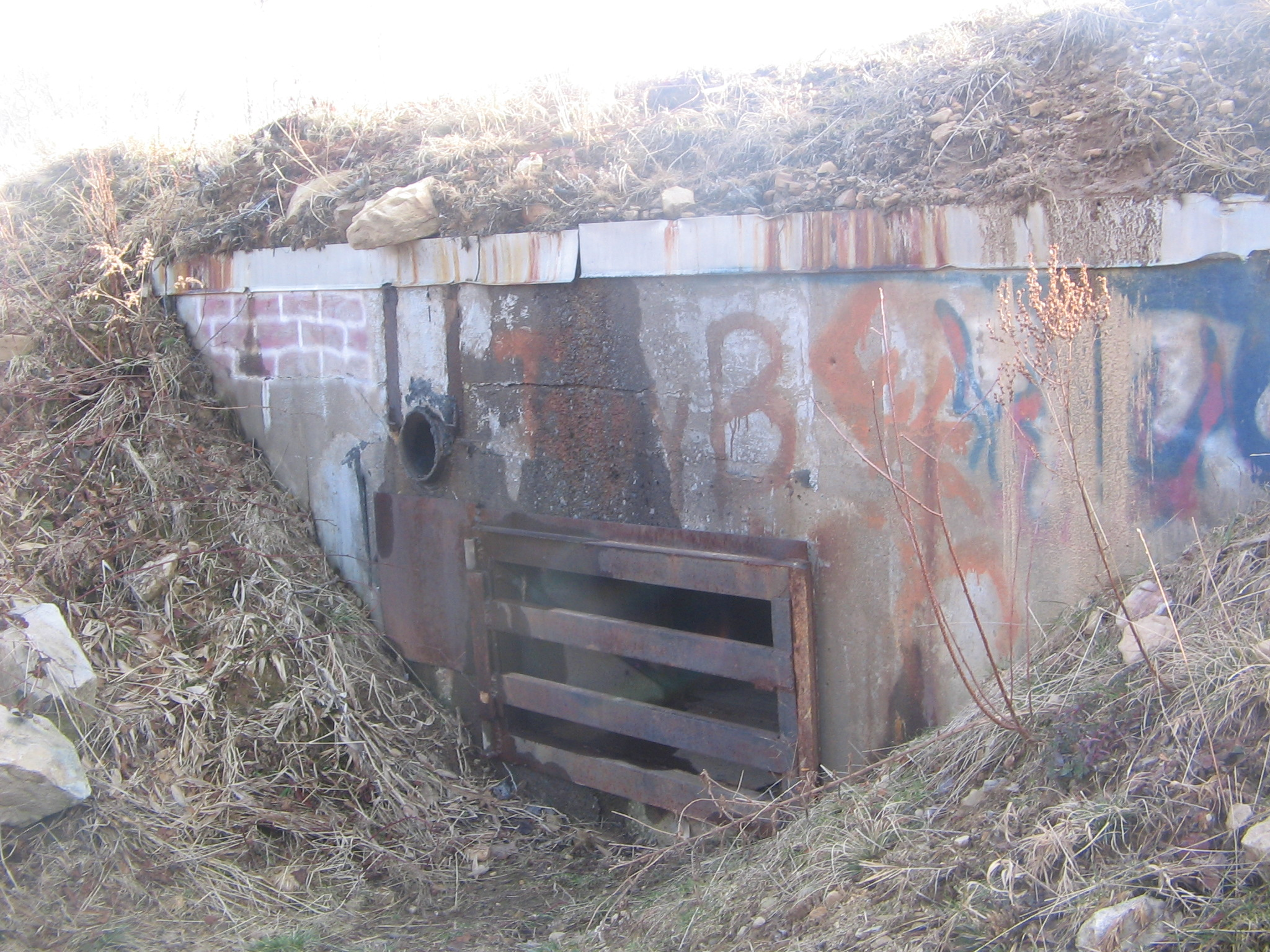
Part of the former southern jet engine test cell bunker, which has been almost completely covered with earth

On September 20, 1967, two Bureau of Forestry employees attempted to remove a metal ladder from a 20,000-US-gallon (76,000 L; 17,000 imp gal) metal storage tank for jet fuel at the northern jet engine test cell. Both were killed in an explosion when the acetylene torch cut through the tank wall and ignited fumes inside it. A tract within the Elk State Forest at the northern edge of the wild area is known as Noble-Chambers Memorial Forest in their memory. Although Fergus reports entering a bunker in his 2002 book, and Young describes a bunker's slit windows in his 2008 book, as of 2010 the southern bunker was covered with earth, and the northern bunker is still completely intact and can be entered.

In 1986, former Curtiss-Wright and Martin Marietta employees testified about hazards and waste disposal practices before a hearing of the Pennsylvania House of Representatives. A former employee told how a night watchman walked through a spill in the reactor complex without knowing it; the man's car and the carpets in his house had to be destroyed as a result of the contamination. Others told about burying hundreds of drums of unknown waste from the reactor facility and digging a trench 125 by 25 feet (38.1 by 7.6 m) and 12 feet (3.7 m) deep for waste drums north of Wykoff Run Road. The locations of some sites, which included radioactive waste, beryllium oxide, and other toxic compounds, were not recorded. A forest ranger testified that he had dismantled a CCC-built drinking water fountain fed by a spring because it was downhill from the reactor and he feared people might drink contaminated water from it.

In 1964, drilling revealed that the Quehanna Wild Area's geology and hydrology made it unsuitable for burying waste. However, according to Seeley's Great Buffaloe Swamp, a history of the Quehanna region, there are 180 contamination sites in the wild area. Waste has been found at the former air field, within the M.K. Goddard/Wykoff Run Natural Area, near the industrial complex, at the former Lincoln Farm, and at the copper wire-burning site on the highway. These last three waste sites were cleaned in 1991 at a cost of $187,698. At the wire-burning site 150 short tons (140 t) of contaminated soil were removed from 3 acres (1.2 ha), with clean earth and grass seed placed on top of the area. The waste was also removed from the farm site, but at the industrial complex the waste was covered with 2,500 cubic yards (1,900 m^{3}) of soil on 4 acres (1.6 ha) and fenced off.

==== Piper complex and boot camp ====
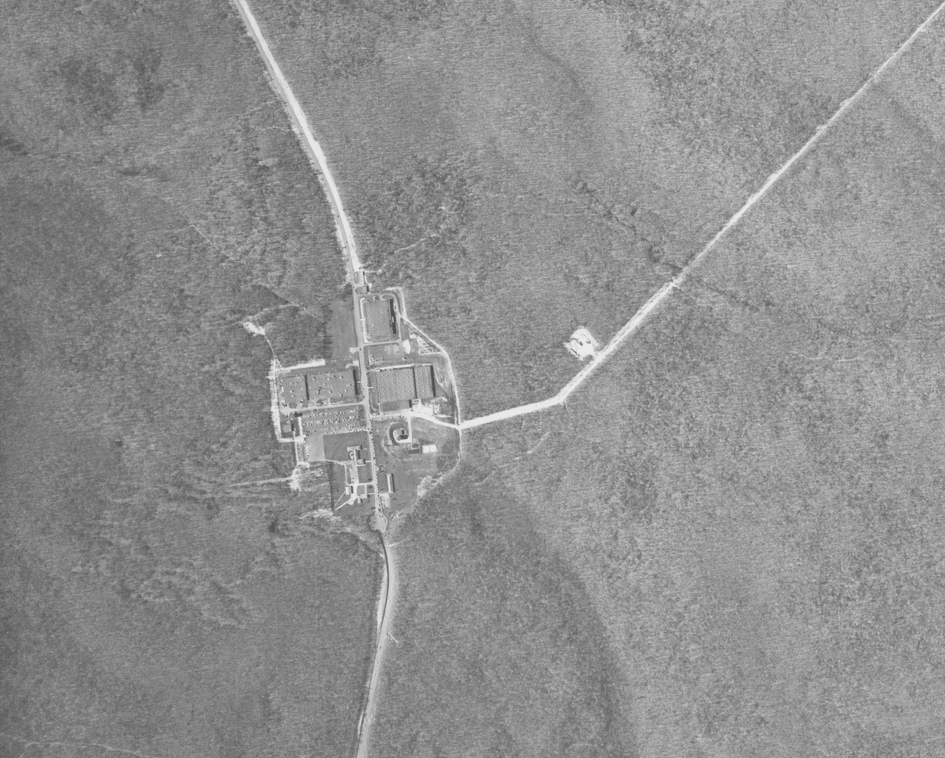
Aerial view of the industrial complex during the Curtiss-Wright era; the Quehanna Highway runs north-south.

The industrial complex covers about 100 acres (40 ha) on both sides of Quehanna Highway at the southeast edge of the Quehanna Wild Area. Although the industrial complex lies within the historic 16-sided polygon, it is no longer part of the wild area. After Curtiss-Wright's lease ended and it donated six of the eight buildings in the complex to the state in 1963, Pennsylvania formed the Commonwealth Industrial Research Corporation to administer and lease the Quehanna facilities, which it did until 1967. Over the years a series of tenants have occupied parts of the industrial complex. One company manufactured logging trailers there from 1967 to 1971, and another processed frozen meat from 1968 to 1970. In 1968 Piper Aircraft established a plant to make metal and plastic parts for airplanes. The complex was renamed from Quehanna to Piper, a name it retains. Piper employed up to 1,000 people, but moved its operations from Pennsylvania to Florida in 1984.

The Young Adult Conservation Corps was also based at Piper from 1977 to 1982. This federally funded program employed up to 45 young people for local conservation projects in the state parks and forests and on state game lands. In addition, Sylvania Electric Products used two buildings in the industrial complex as warehouses for light bulbs until 1993. In 1992, the Pennsylvania Department of Transportation began a heavy equipment training school at Piper, which is still in operation.

In 1992 the Pennsylvania Department of Corrections opened the Quehanna Motivational Boot Camp at Piper as the state's "first military-style motivational boot camp". The minimum security program for non-violent, first-time offenders has accepted both male and female inmates from the start. Originally designed to house 200, the Department of Corrections expanded the facility in the late 1990s to a capacity of 500 on about 50 acres (20 ha). The inmates spend six months in a military-style program that offers opportunities for education and builds positive life skills; they also are offered drug and alcohol therapy. Those who successfully complete the boot camp program, which is considered an alternative to prison, are released on parole. The boot camp began to receive men and women from the "general population of state prison inmates" in 2005 and 2006, respectively. At the end of June 2009, the facility had 494 inmates, 61 percent of whom were in the boot camp program, and cost just over $17 million a year to operate. In January 2026 it was announced the facility will close by March 1, 2026. Future plans for the property are indeterminate.

==== Wild area ====
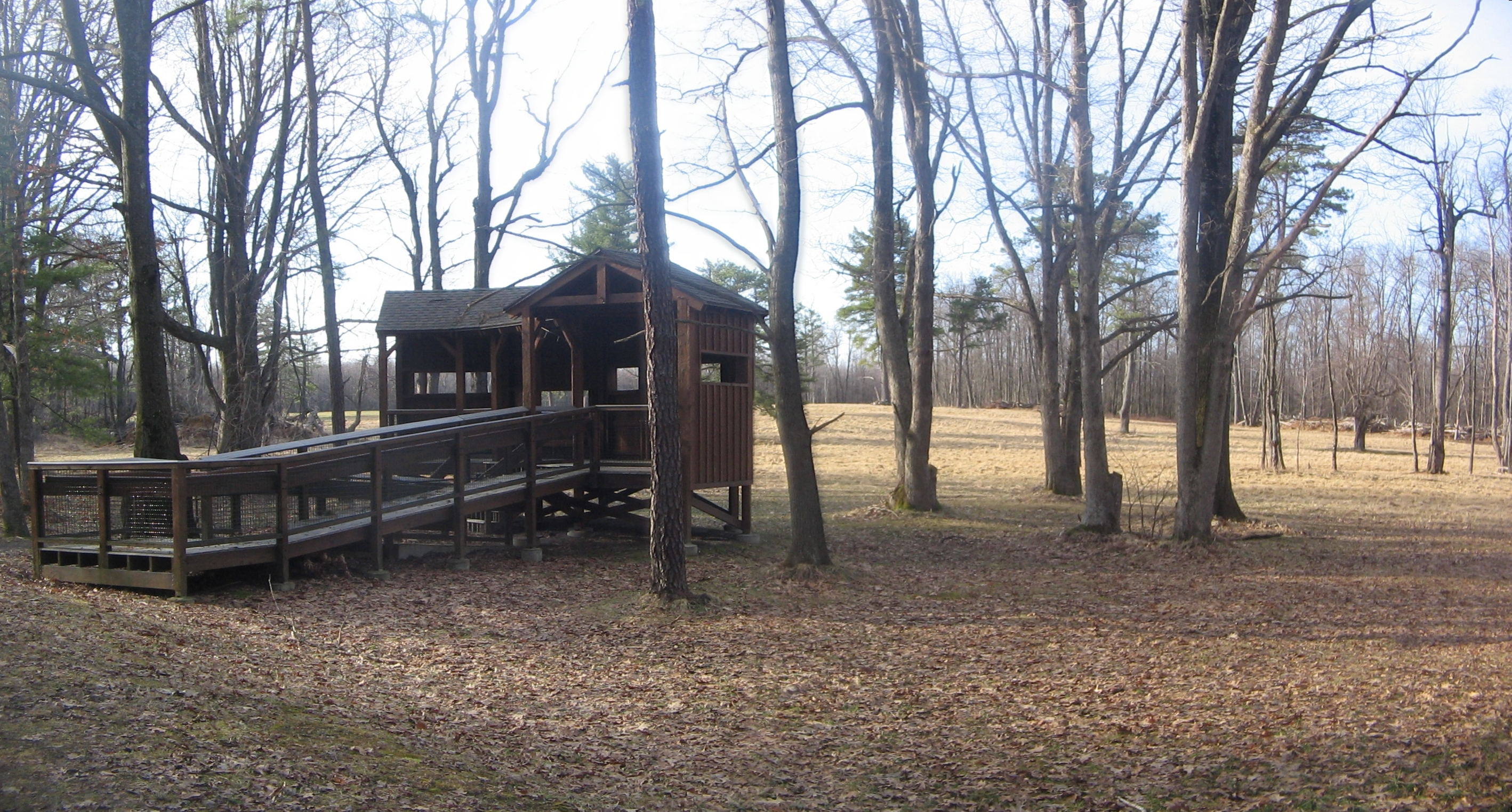
Wildlife viewing blind at Hoover Farm Wildlife Viewing Area

In December 1970 the state forest commission officially changed the designation from Quehanna Wilderness Area to Quehanna Wild Area, making it the first state forest wild area in Pennsylvania. Elk and Moshannon state forests jointly administer Quehanna's 48,186 acres (75.3 sq mi; 195.0 km^{2}); for comparison, this is over three times larger than the 23-square-mile (60 km^{2}) area of Manhattan, making Quehanna the largest of the 16 wild areas in the state. According to the Pennsylvania Bureau of Forestry, "a wild area is an extensive area, which the general public will be permitted to see, use and enjoy for such activities as hiking, hunting, and fishing. No development of a permanent nature will be permitted in order to retain the undeveloped character of the area. These areas will be administered according to the principals of forest protection...".

Consequently, within a wild area, no new permanent camp leases, mines, wells, roads, or rights-of-way for utility lines are allowed, although existing camps, roads, and rights-of-way may remain. Vehicles are allowed only on public roads; trails are limited to hikers, bicyclists, equestrians, and wheelchairs, and only primitive camping by backpackers is allowed. Quehanna has two paved roads open to vehicles, and is crossed by rights-of-way for three electrical power lines and two natural gas pipelines. It is one of the largest areas in Pennsylvania without permanent inhabitants.

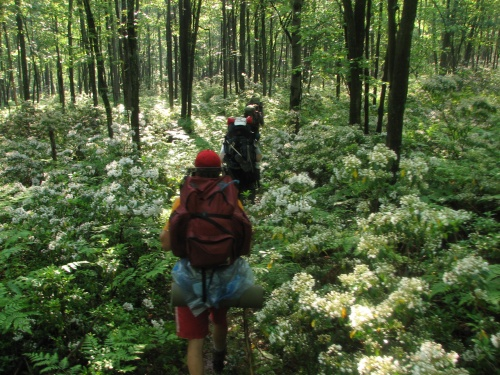
Hikers passing through mountain laurel on the Quehanna Trail, built in 1976–1977

The state forest system also has natural areas, with more restricted usage. According to the Bureau of Forestry, "A natural area is an area of unique scenic, historic, geologic or ecological value that will be maintained in a natural condition by allowing physical and biological processes to operate, usually without direct human intervention." Quehanna Wild Area contains two state forest natural areas: the 1,215-acre (492 ha) M.K. Goddard/Wykoff Run Natural Area in the center, and the 917-acre (371 ha) Marion Brooks Natural Area on the northwest edge. Marion Brooks Natural Area, known for its 22-acre (8.9 ha) stand of white birch, was formerly known as Paige Run Natural Area; in 1975 it was renamed for Marion E. Brooks, a pioneering environmentalist from Elk County. Quehanna Wild Area also has two wildlife viewing areas with blinds for observing elk and other animals: Beaver Run Dam's pond and wetlands and Hoover Farm's fields and feeding plots.

The Quehanna plateau is home to the Quehanna Trail, a 73.2-mile (117.8 km) loop hiking trail, about 34 miles (55 km) of which are in Quehanna Wild Area. The trail was built in 1976 and 1977 with help from a federally funded jobs program, the Young Adult Conservation Corps, and the Pennsylvania Conservation Corps. Parts of the trail have been moved, away from damage caused by the 1985 tornado, to avoid pipelines, to circumvent the Piper Boot Camp, and to pass closer to streams. The wild area also has six shallow ponds for waterfowl and other wildlife, the result of dams built on marshy areas in the 1970s. In 1997 the whole Quehanna Wild Area was declared Pennsylvania Important Bird Area #31 by the Pennsylvania Audubon Society. In 2003, the Bureau of Forestry proposed expanding the Quehanna Wild Area by incorporating more of the surrounding Elk and Moshannon State Forests.

Despite efforts to restrict use, some environmentalists criticize Quehanna's administration. Christopher Klyza, author of Wilderness Comes Home: Rewilding the Northeast, notes that the Pennsylvania wild areas are not true wilderness areas. He is especially critical of the continued use of roads through the wild areas and limited logging allowed "for forest health and wildlife habitat improvements".

== Geology and climate ==
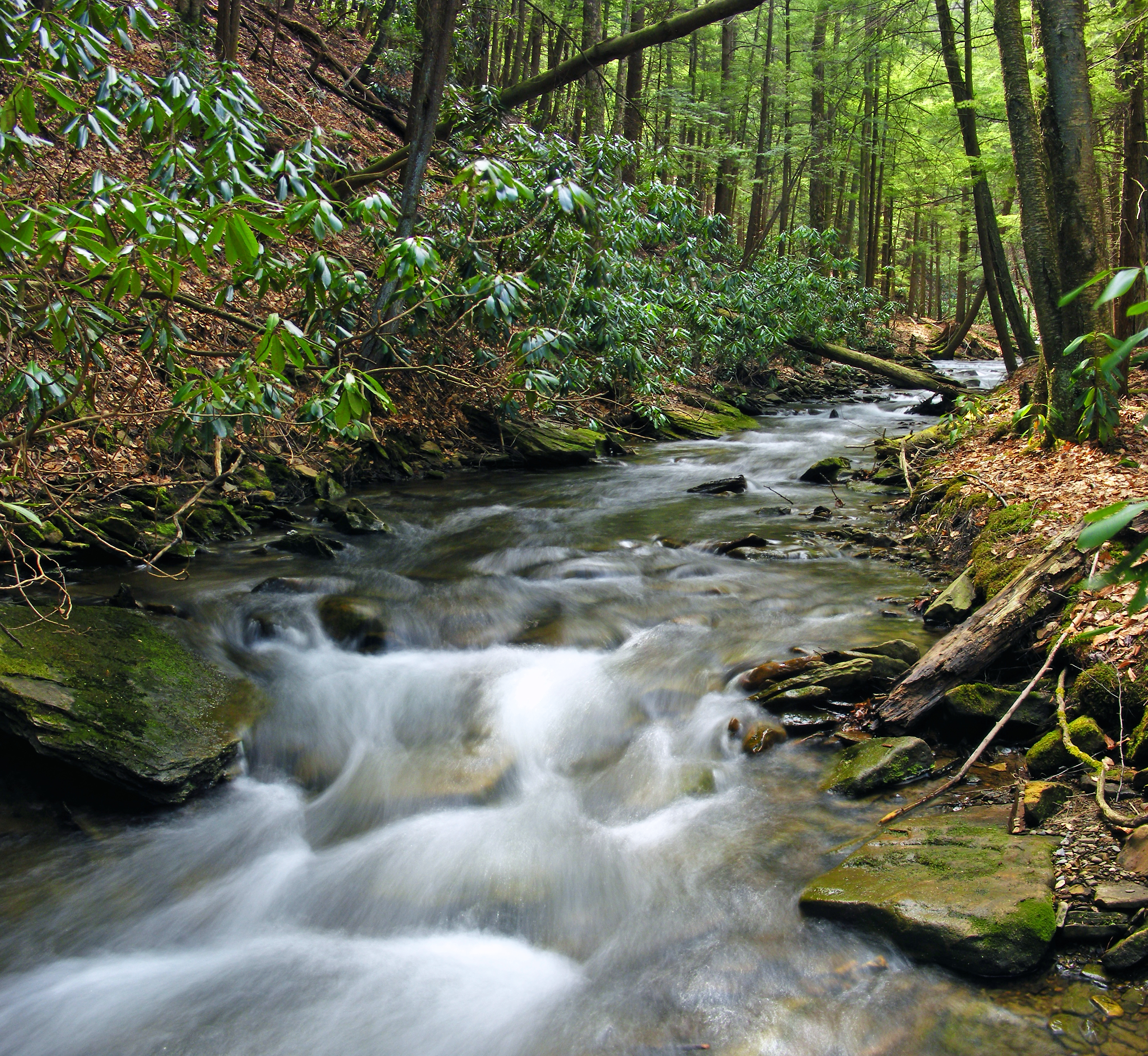
From its source in M.K. Goddard/Wykoff Run Natural Area, Wykoff Run drops 1,352 feet (412 m) through four rock formations.

Quehanna Wild Area lies at an elevation of 1,896 feet (578 m) on the Allegheny Plateau. The area falls into portions of two distinct geological physiographic provinces, with all but the northernmost part in the Pittsburgh Low Plateau, known for its coal and mineral deposits, and characterized by steep-cut stream beds. The northernmost part of the wild area, including Marion Brooks Natural Area, is in the Deep Valleys section, home to some of the most remote and wild areas of the state; streams here have cut deep valleys with steep-sided slopes. In the southern part of Quehanna Wild Area, the Mosquito Creek gorge is up to 500 feet (150 m) deep, and the Red Run gorge in the north is almost 900 feet (270 m) deep.

The Allegheny Plateau formed in the Alleghenian orogeny some 300 million years ago, when the part of Gondwana that became Africa collided with the landmass that became North America, forming Pangaea. In the dissected plateau, years of erosion have cut away the soft rocks, forming the valleys, and leaving the hardest rocks relatively untouched. The land on which Quehanna Wild Area sits was part of the coastline of a shallow sea that covered a great portion of what is now North America in the Pennsylvanian subperiod. The high mountains to the east of the sea gradually eroded, causing a buildup of sediment made up primarily of clay, sand and gravel. Tremendous pressure on the sediment caused the formation of the rocks that are found today.

At least five major rock formations from the Devonian and Carboniferous periods are present in Quehanna Wild Area. The youngest of these, which forms the highest points on the plateau, is the Pennsylvanian Allegheny Formation, which has clay, coal, limestone, sandstone, and shale. Below this is the Pennsylvanian Pottsville Formation, a gray conglomerate that may contain sandstone, siltstone, and shale, as well as anthracite coal, and which forms much of the Quehanna plateau. The next formations are found in the valleys and gorges which the creeks have eroded over time. The first of these is the Mississippian Pocono Formation, which is buff-colored with shale, coal, and conglomerate inclusions; parts of this formation are also known as the Burgoon Sandstone. Below this is the late Devonian and early Mississippian Huntley Mountain Formation, which is made of relatively soft grayish-red shale and olive-gray sandstone. The lowest and oldest layer is the red shale and siltstone of the Catskill Formation.

The Allegheny Plateau has a continental climate, with occasional severe low temperatures in winter and average daily temperature ranges (the difference between the daily high and low) of 20 °F (11 °C) in winter and 26 °F (14 °C) in summer. Quehanna Wild Area is part of the Mosquito Creek and Wykoff Run watersheds, where the mean annual precipitation is 40 to 42 inches (1,016 to 1,067 mm). Weather records are not available for Quehanna Wild Area, but they are known for the nearby village of Karthaus. The highest recorded temperature at Karthaus was 106 °F (41 °C) in 2011, and the record low was −22 °F (−30 °C) in 1994. On average, January is the coldest month, July is the hottest month, and June is the wettest month.

Climate data for Karthaus, Pennsylvania (nearest village to Quehanna Wild Area)
Month	Jan	Feb	Mar	Apr	May	Jun	Jul	Aug	Sep	Oct	Nov	Dec	Year
Mean daily maximum °F (°C)	34 (1)	38 (3)	47 (8)	61 (16)	71 (22)	79 (26)	83 (28)	82 (28)	74 (23)	63 (17)	51 (11)	38 (3)	60 (16)
Mean daily minimum °F (°C)	17 (−8)	18 (−8)	24 (−4)	34 (1)	44 (7)	54 (12)	59 (15)	58 (14)	51 (11)	39 (4)	31 (−1)	23 (−5)	38 (3)
Average precipitation inches (mm)	2.55 (65)	2.39 (61)	3.34 (85)	3.46 (88)	3.74 (95)	4.32 (110)	4.19 (106)	3.95 (100)	4.00 (102)	3.33 (85)	3.69 (94)	2.98 (76)	41.94 (1,067)
Source: The Weather Channel

=== 1985 tornado ===
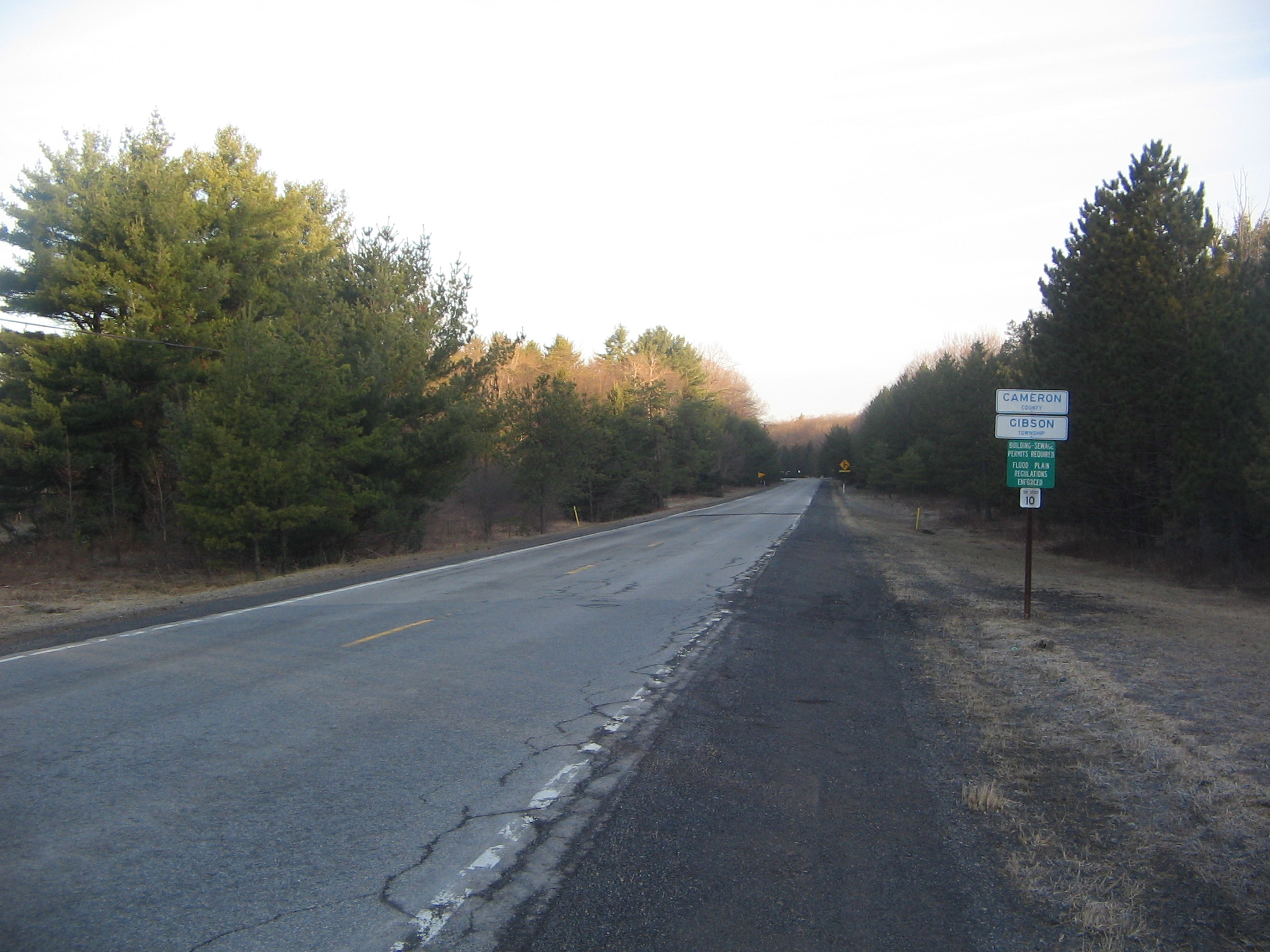
Looking west on the Quehanna Highway at the Clearfield–Cameron county line, where the 1985 tornado crossed the road

On May 31, 1985, an outbreak of 43 tornadoes struck northeastern Ohio, western and central Pennsylvania, New York, and southern Ontario, killing 88 people. The Storm Data Center of the National Weather Service rated the outbreak "the 12th most 'significant' tornado event of all time". Pennsylvania was struck by 17 tornadoes that Memorial Day, including the only F5 tornado on the Fujita scale in the state's history. The tornadoes caused 65 deaths in Pennsylvania and were not dissipated by the state's mountainous landscape, "forever putting to rest the myth that such terrain can deter them".

An F4 tornado passed through Quehanna Wild Area; its path of destruction crossed the Quehanna Highway at the Clearfield–Cameron county line. It traveled over 69 miles (111 km) of mainly dense forest and wilderness in central Pennsylvania, and damaged or destroyed buildings early in its life, including a CCC-built lodge at Parker Dam State Park. The damage path from this storm was estimated to be at least 2.2 miles (3.5 km) wide. Its winds—200 to 260 miles per hour (320 to 420 km/h)—ripped up small and medium-sized trees and shrubs, tore leaves and limbs from some of the big trees, and snapped others like matchsticks. As it headed west through Moshannon State Forest in Clearfield and Centre counties, Gregory S. Forbes, then a meteorology professor at Penn State, said the debris from the tornado was visible on his WSR-57 radar scanners. The reactor building was just north of the tornado's path and suffered $200,000 in damage, but no radiation leaks occurred.

The tornado outbreak injured more than 1,000 people and caused $450 million in total damages and destruction. Moshannon State Forest lost an estimated $8 million in lumber to the tornado that hit Quehanna; after the storm, $2 million in timber was salvaged in the state forest. In the ensuing years, the affected forest at Quehanna, though younger and smaller than the surrounding woods, has partly recovered. The official map for the Quehanna Trail is labeled "tornado zone" where the twister passed through the wild area.

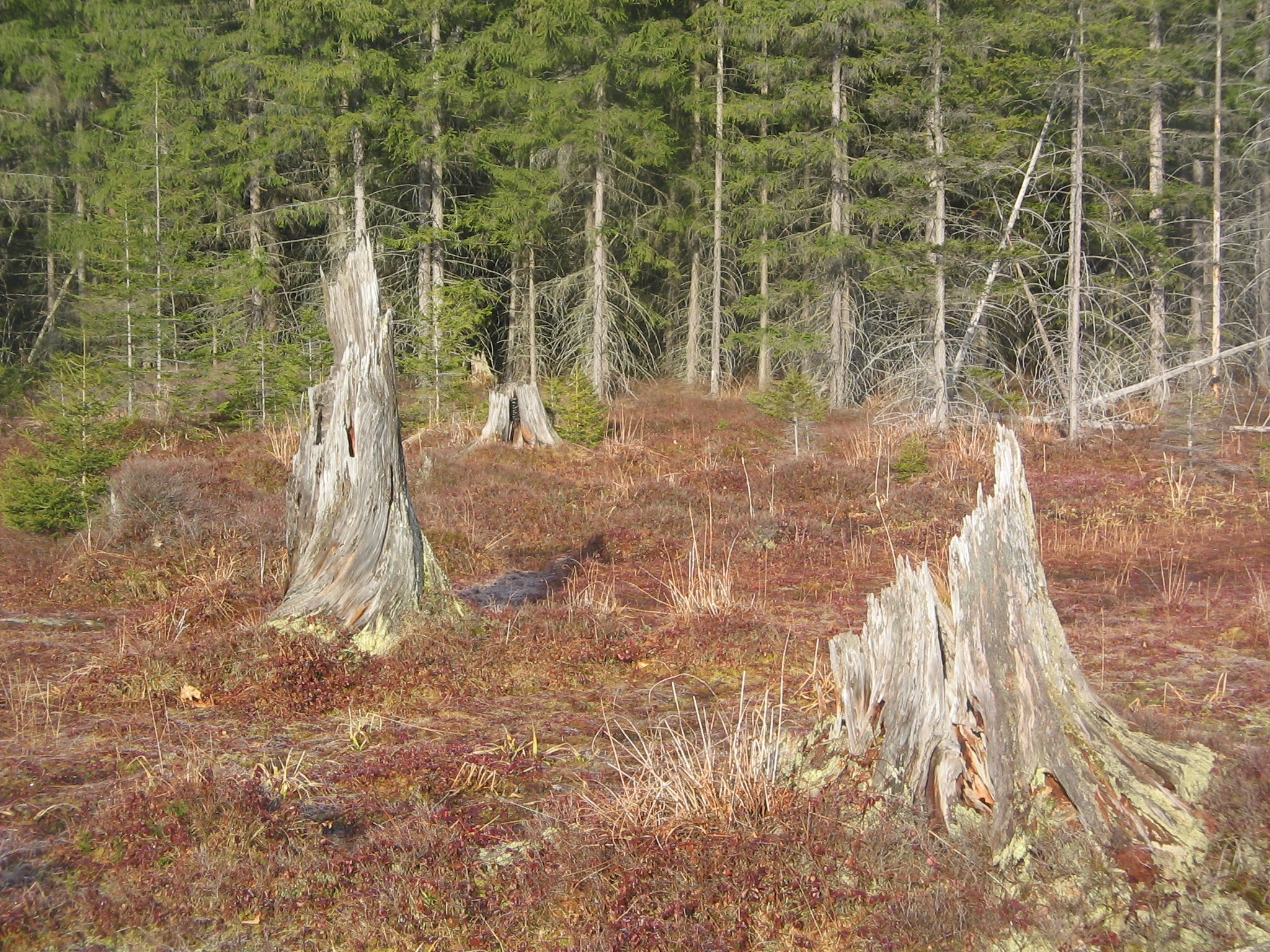
Stumps from logging in the late 19th and early 20th centuries, in a wetland area north of Reactor Road

== Ecology ==
=== Flora ===
The virgin forests of what became Quehanna Wild Area were different in composition and quality than those of today. Eastern white pine and eastern hemlock were more common, often found on shady slopes and damp areas on plateaus. Chestnut oak and pitch pine favored slopes that were sandy or rocky, and the forest had a mixture of hardwoods, including ash, beech, birch, chestnut, maple, and yellow poplar. Each acre (0.4 ha) of these virgin forests could produce up to 100,000 board feet (236 m^{3}) of white pine and 200,000 board feet (472 m^{3}) of hemlock and hardwoods. For comparison, the same area of forest today produces a total of 5,000 board feet (11.8 m^{3}) on average. The virgin forests cooled the land and streams. Centuries of accumulated organic matter in the forest soil caused slow percolation of rainfall into the streams, so they flowed more evenly year-round.

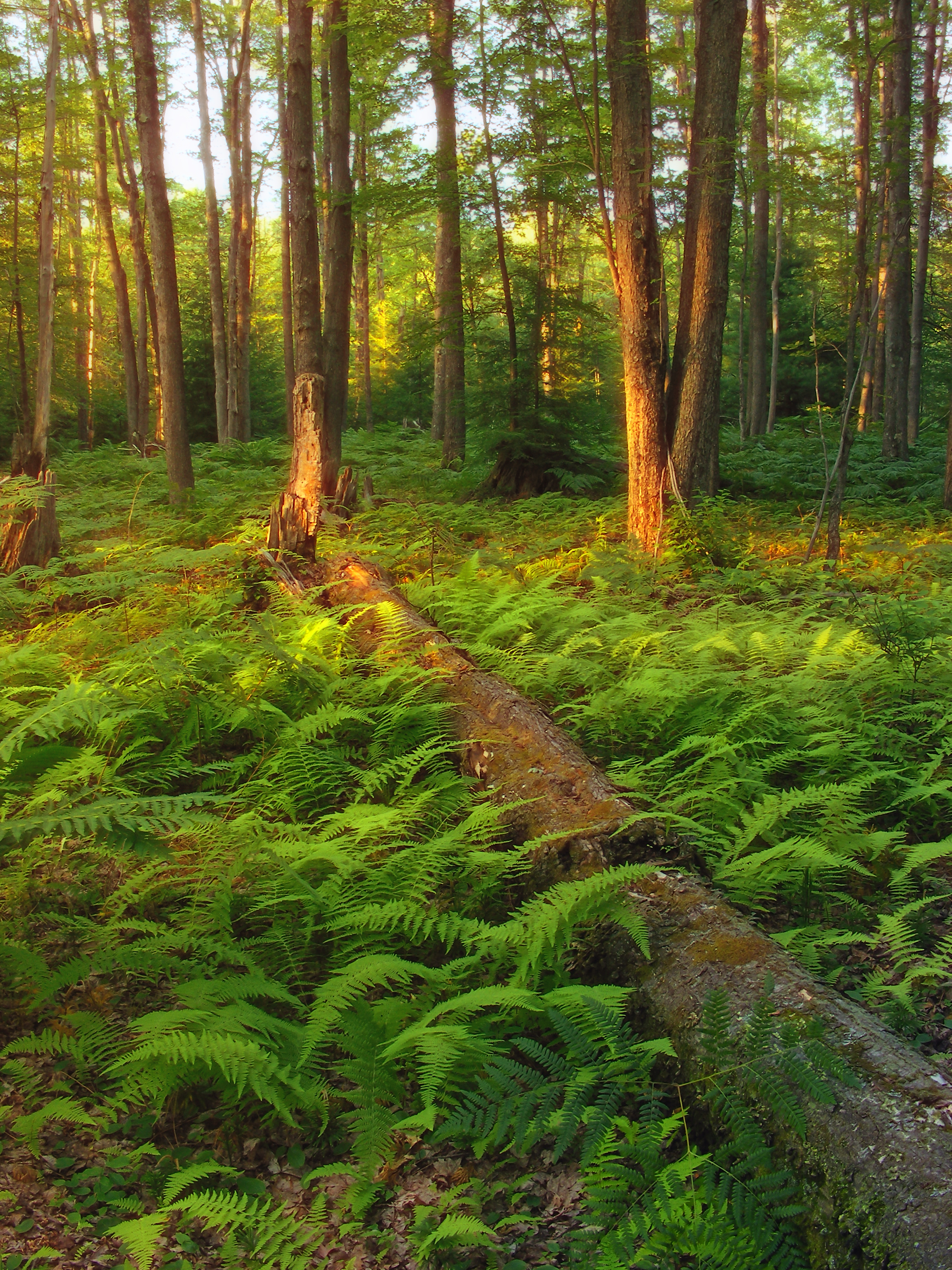
Second-growth trees in Moshannon State Forest

The clearcutting and repeated fires changed all of this. New growth was often composed of different plants and trees than had originally been there. Near Beaver Run in Quehanna there are wetlands that were originally hemlock forest. Hemlocks transpire large amounts of water and once they were gone the soil was too wet to support most trees; the bracken and ferns that replaced the hemlocks altered the soil qualities to discourage trees as well. Within the Quehanna Wild Area 650 acres (260 ha) are wetlands. Fires and erosion removed nutrients from the soil, and in some areas the soil was so poor in nutrients that only white birch, a pioneer species, would grow there. Marion Brooks Natural Area has the largest stand of white birch in Pennsylvania and the eastern United States. These trees are now 80 to 90 years old and reaching the end of their lifespans.

Besides forest fires and tornado damage, there have been other threats to Quehanna's forests in the 20th century. Many trees were lost when chestnut blight wiped out the American chestnut trees by 1925; in the Quehanna area, this species constituted between one-quarter and one-half of the hardwoods. In the 1960s, white and chestnut oak trees had high mortality from pit scale insects and associated fungi. Larvae of oak leaf roller moths, which defoliate oaks, first appeared on 8,200 acres (3,300 ha) of Quehanna Wild Area in the late 1960s; at their peak in the late 1960s and early 1970s they had defoliated 234,700 acres (95,000 ha) of Moshannon State Forest and 110,000 acres (45,000 ha) in Elk State Forest, with moderate to heavy tree mortality. A similar pest, oak leaf tier, stripped 375,000 acres (152,000 ha) of oaks in Elk State Forest by 1970. The gypsy moth defoliated over 156,000 acres (63,000 ha) of deciduous trees in the 1970s and 1980s. The forests within the Quehanna Important Bird Area are 84 percent hardwoods, 4 percent mixed hardwood and evergreens, less than 1 percent evergreens, 7 percent transitional between forests and fields, and 3 percent perennial herbaceous plants. As well as trees, the forests have blueberry and huckleberry bushes and thickets of mountain laurel and rhododendron.

=== Fauna ===
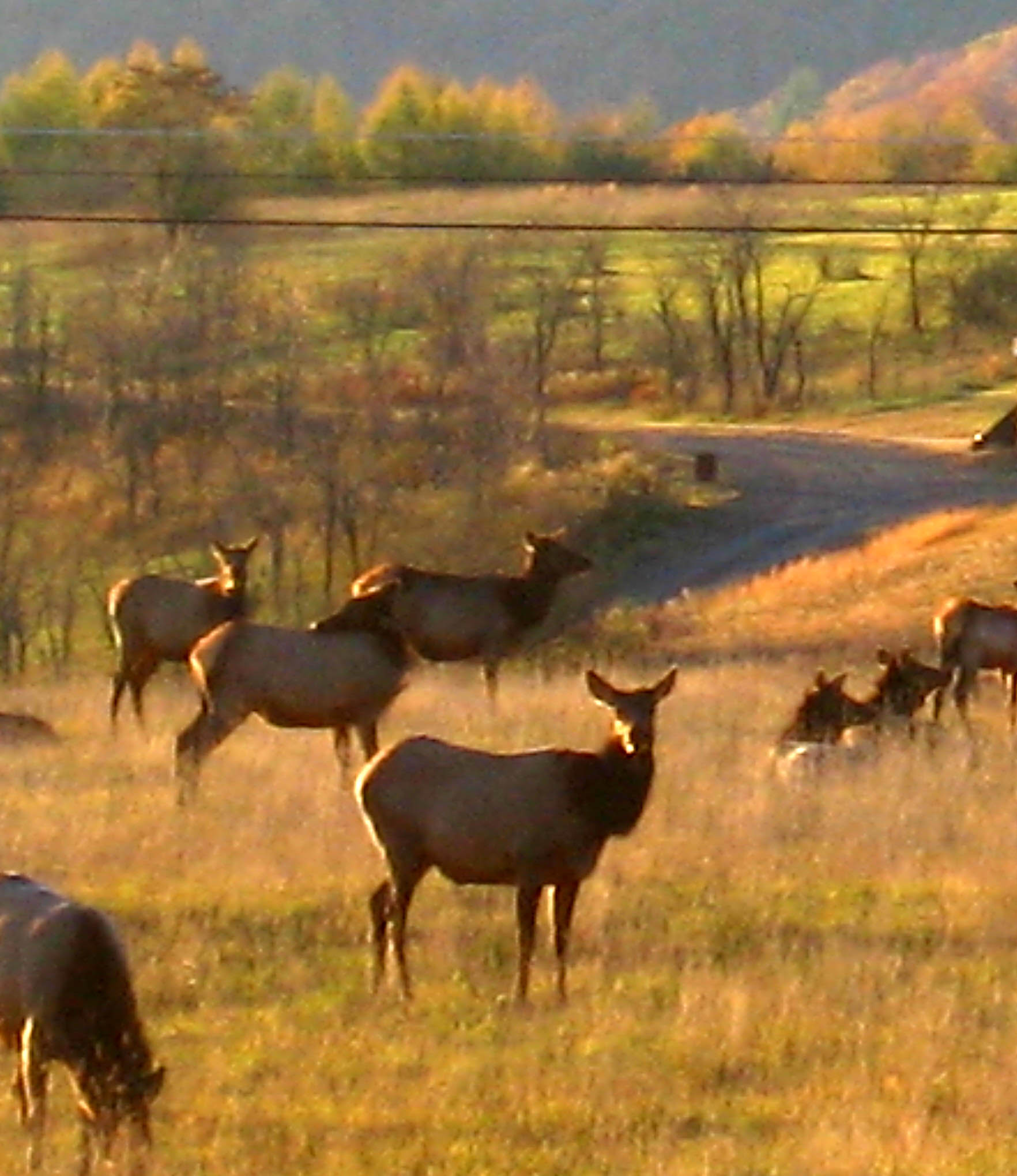
Pennsylvania's elk herd, pictured here in Elk County near Quehanna WIld Area, is sought by both hunters and tourists.

Some animals, previously present in abundance, have disappeared, or the populations declined, through habitat loss. By 1912, after the forests had been clearcut, Quehanna was covered by "vast expanses of brush, created when the root systems of cut-off trees sprouted up through the discarded tops and limbs of the logged forest". Once the forest fires were controlled, this brush offered habitat for many game species. By the early 1940s, the CCC had thinned brush in many areas, and the forest had matured. Shade from the canopy decreased brush in the understory. By the early 21st century, many of the trees in Quehanna were 80 to 100 years old, and the maturation of the forests led to the disappearance of species like bobwhite quail, ring-necked pheasant, and snowshoe hare; white-tailed deer, ruffed grouse, black squirrel, and cottontail rabbit all became less common. Efforts by the Mosquito Creek Sportsmen's Association to reintroduce bobwhite quail, ring-necked pheasant, and snowshoe hare have been unsuccessful.

Other animals became locally extinct through overhunting. The last elk in Pennsylvania was killed in Elk County in 1867. The Pennsylvania Game Commission brought 177 animals from the Rocky Mountains to the state from 1913 to 1926; today the elk herd of over 600 animals can often be seen in Quehanna Wild Area. Between 1906 and 1925, Pennsylvania became so concerned about declining numbers of white-tailed deer that it imported nearly 1,200 animals from Michigan to re-establish the species, and made it the official state animal in 1959. In the early 21st century, over-grazing by deer threatens plant diversity. By the early 20th century, the fisher, a small mammal similar to the European polecat or American marten, was hunted to extinction in Pennsylvania. Between 1994 and 1998, 190 animals were released in five sites in the northern part of the state, including 23 animals along Quehanna's Wykoff Run in 1995. Breeding populations of fisher appear to have been reestablished.

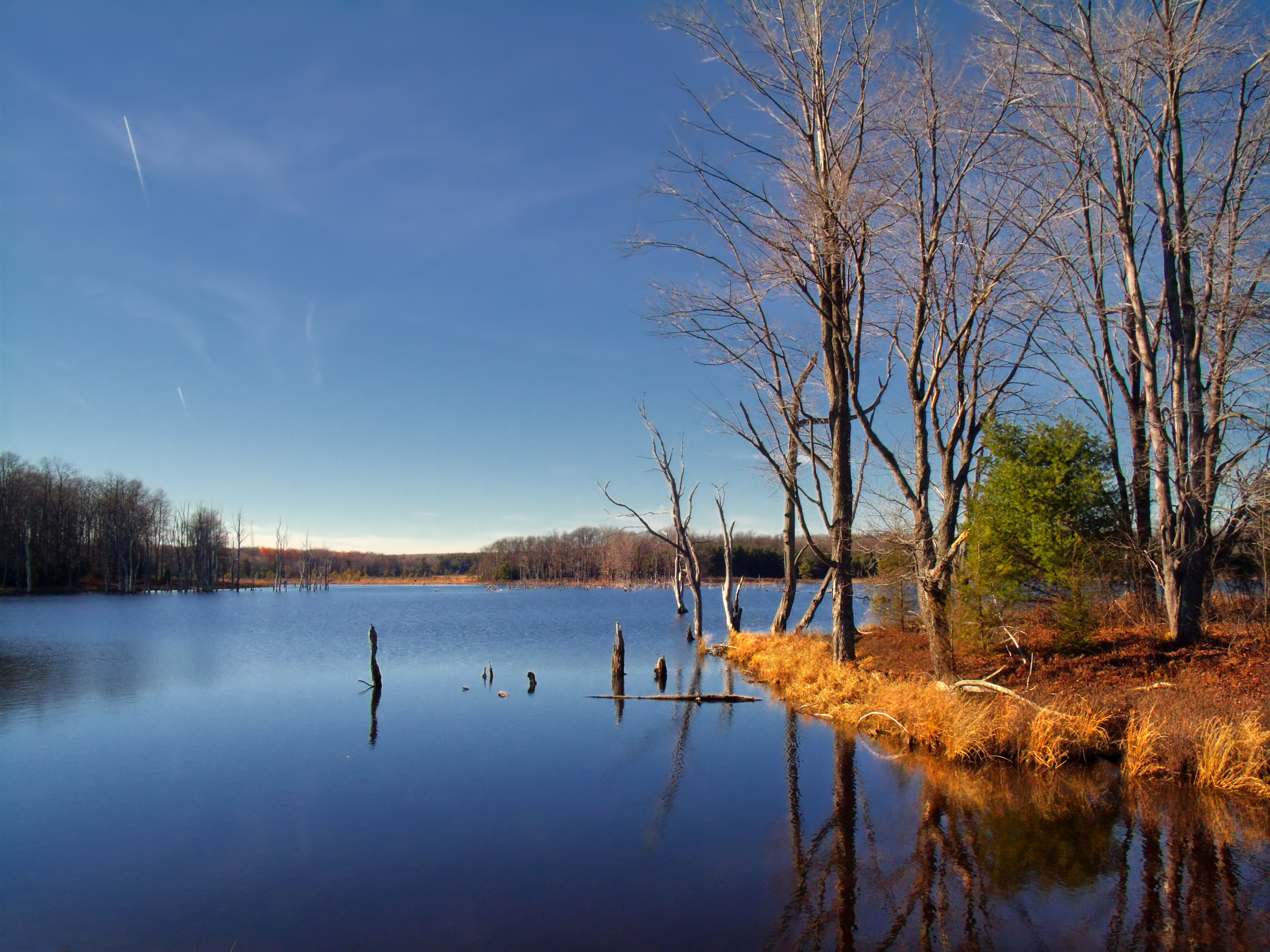
Pond and wetlands at Beaver Run Wildlife Viewing Area

Still other animals seem to thrive regardless of the maturity of the forest or the presence of the understory. Common animals found in Quehanna include chipmunks, porcupine, and beaver, omnivores such as the black bear and raccoon, and predators like bobcat, red fox, and coyote (which has been in Pennsylvania since the 1930s). Many of the streams in Quehanna Wild Area are known for trout (brook, brown and rainbow); some populations are wild and others are stocked by the Pennsylvania Fish and Boat Commission and Mosquito Creek Sportsmen's Association. The wild area is also home to timber rattlesnake, eastern garter snake, and spring peeper (a type of frog), as well as butterflies like great spangled fritillary, monarch, red-spotted purple, and black, eastern tiger, and spicebush swallowtails. Any of these mammals, especially the white-tailed deer, can carry ticks, and such tick-borne diseases as Lyme disease are a health concern for hikers.

As an International Bird Area, Quehanna's forests are recognized as a "large, unfragmented tract with exceptional diversity of woodland species" and are home to 102 species of birds. Common birds include American crow, black-capped chickadee, blue jay, broad-winged hawk, common raven, hermit thrush, house sparrow, northern waterthrush, starling, whip-poor-will, and wild turkey. Quehanna Wild Area includes a variety of forest, riparian, and wetland habitats that support a diversity of animals. The shrub and scrubland areas left by the 1985 tornado and cleared for elk to feed in are home to indigo bunting and prairie warbler, while ponds and wetlands attract waterfowl such as hooded merganser and wood duck, and wading birds like great blue heron. The birch forest of Marion Brooks Natural Area is home to downy, hairy, and pileated woodpeckers, the oak forest of M.K. Goddard/Wykoff Run Natural Area has black-throated green warbler, red-eyed vireo, and white-breasted nuthatch, and its aspen groves have woodcock. In addition to the commonly seen red-tailed hawk, other raptors include the northern goshawk and the golden and bald eagles.

== Recreation ==
=== Hiking and skiing ===
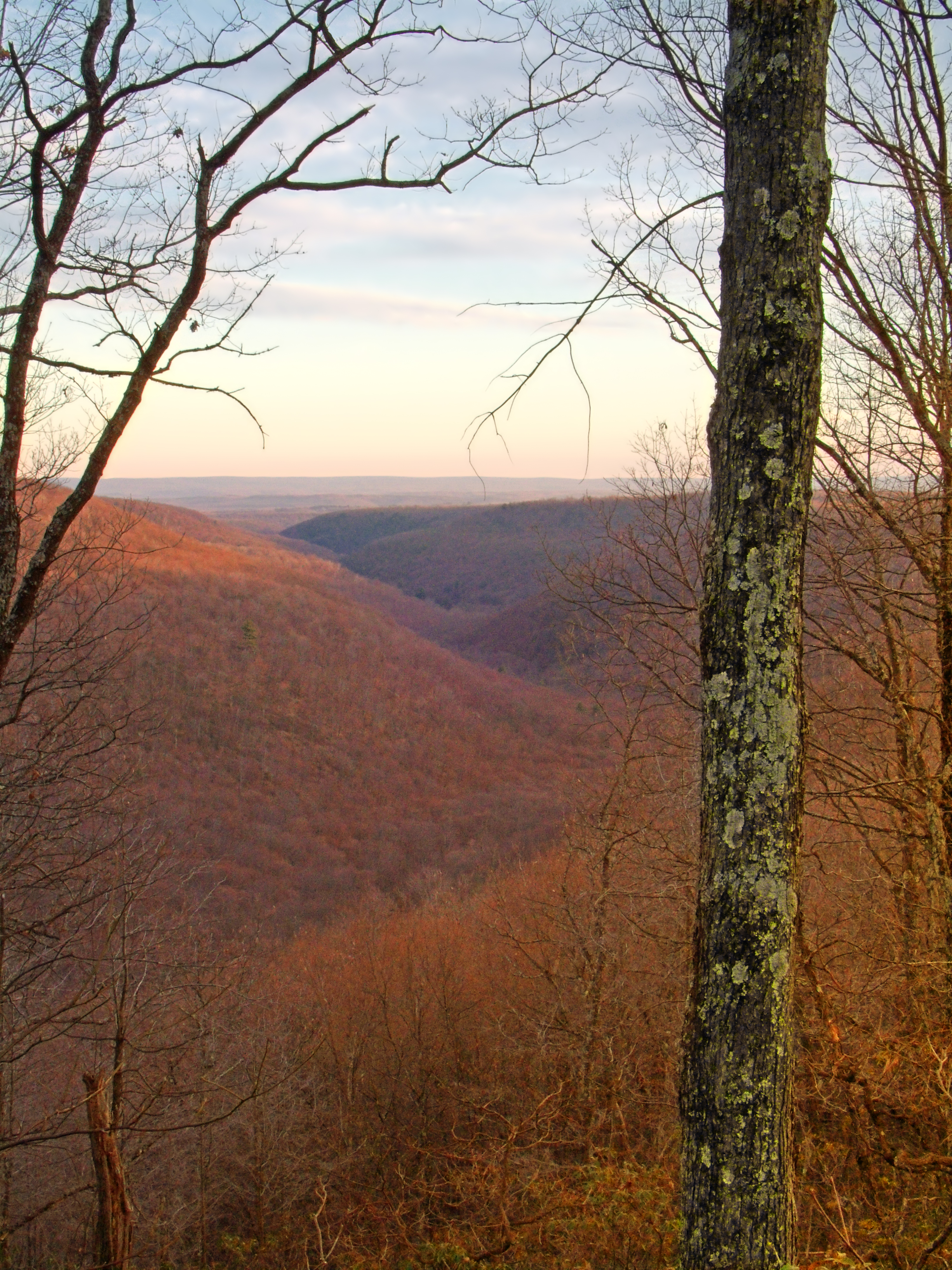
Mosquito Creek gorge is used for hiking, fishing, and hunting.

According to the DCNR, Quehanna Wild Area is for the public "to see, use and enjoy for such activities as hiking, hunting, and fishing". The main hiking trail on the Quehanna plateau is the Quehanna Trail, a 73.2-mile (117.8 km) loop trail that passes through the wild area and Moshannon and Elk State Forests. The main trailhead for most hikers is at Parker Dam State Park to the west of the wild area. From there the trail, which is blazed in orange, heads east to the southern part of Quehanna Wild Area, skirts Piper and the Boot Camp there, then turns north, crosses Wykoff Run and turns west again. After passing through Marion Brooks Natural Area, the trail leaves the wild area and completes the loop back at Parker Dam. The Quehanna Trail is considered a strenuous hike not just because of its length, but for its 9,700 feet (2,957 m) of changes in elevation. Two yellow-blazed connector trails add 30 miles (48 km) to the system, and there are many side trails and small trails off the Quehanna Highway. Most trails are open to cross-country skiing in the winter. According to the DCNR, the Quehanna Trail "passes through some of the most wild and beautiful country Pennsylvania has to offer".

=== Hunting ===
Susan Stranahan's Susquehanna: River of Dreams reports that before Curtiss-Wright took over the area in 1955, Quehanna was considered "some of the best hunting land in the state". No hunting or fishing were initially allowed on the leased land, but by July 1959 fishing on Mosquito Creek was allowed again, as was limited hunting to help control the deer. In October 1963 hunting resumed throughout the wild area, four years before the state purchased the land back from Curtiss-Wright. As of 2010, the Pennsylvania Game Commission allowed hunting of the following species found in Quehanna Wild Area: American crow, beaver, black bear, black squirrel, bobcat, bobwhite quail, cottontail rabbit, coyote, elk, house sparrow, raccoon, red fox, ring-necked pheasant, ruffed grouse, white-tailed deer, wild turkey, and woodcock. The Mosquito Creek Sportsmen's Association has sponsored an annual coyote hunt each winter hunt since 1992. The club has also provided food plots for deer and elk, fed game animals in winter, planted and pruned fruit trees, stocked fish, and treated streams for acid rain. Fishing is primarily for trout.

=== Bird watching ===
The Quehanna Wild Area is also seen, used, and enjoyed by bird watchers attracted by its status as an Important Bird Area. Audubon Pennsylvania and the DCNR have prepared the Susquehanna River Birding and Wildlife Trail guide which lists three sites in Quehanna: Wykoff Run, Beaver Run Wildlife Viewing Area, and the whole wild area. The DCNR has published a guide to Elk Scenic Drive which lists 23 attractions, four in Quehanna: Marion Brooks and M.K. Goddard/Wykoff Run Natural Areas, and Beaver Run and Hoover Farm Wildlife Viewing Areas.

=== Horseback riding ===
Quehanna Wild Area has approximately 50 miles of shared-use trails open to horseback riding, with numerous trail heads. Some trails are quite easy, while more remote trails can be challenging. Yellowsnake Equestrian Campground near the village of Piper offers six sites geared towards horse users, albeit with very minimal facilities.

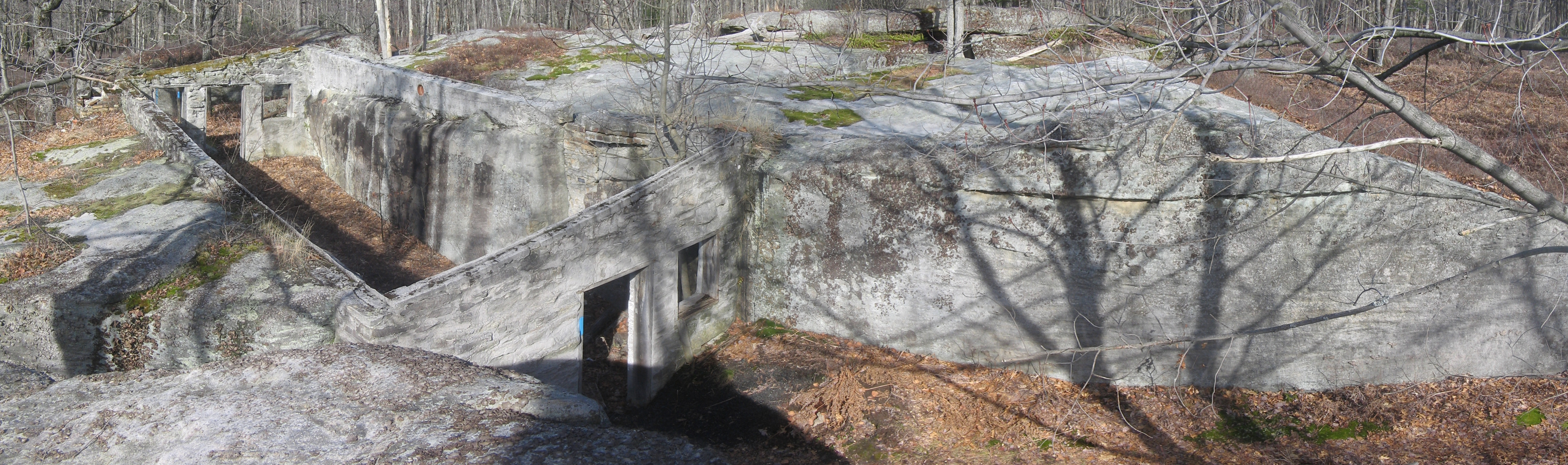
Panoramic view of the ruins of Kunes Camp, a hunting cabin built in the early 20th century between two boulders, which is on a trail 1 mile (1.6 km) south of Quehanna Highway

== Sources ==
- Audubon Pennsylvania; Pennsylvania Department of Conservation and Natural Resources (2004). Susquehanna River Birding and Wildlife Trail. Harrisburg, Pennsylvania: Audubon Pennsylvania and Department of Conservation and Natural Resources, Commonwealth of Pennsylvania. OCLC 56944102. Archived from the original on April 18, 2009.
- Dillon, Chuck (2006). "Human Issues Affecting the Stream". Pennsylvania's Grand Canyon: A Natural & Human History (2nd ed.). Wellsboro, Pennsylvania: Pine Creek Press. OCLC 25236134.
- Donehoo, Dr. George P. (1999) [1928]. A History of the Indian Villages and Place Names in Pennsylvania (PDF) (Second Reprint ed.). Lewisburg, Pennsylvania: Wennawoods Publishing. ISBN 1-889037-11-7. Archived from the original (PDF) on March 4, 2009. Note: ISBN refers to a 1999 reprint edition, URL is for the Susquehanna River Basin Commission's web page of Native American Place names, quoting and citing the book.
- Fergus, Charles (2002). "Chapter 32. Marion Brooks Natural Area, Chapter 56. Wycoff Run (sic)". Natural Pennsylvania: Exploring the State Forest Natural Areas (1st ed.). Mechanicsburg, Pennsylvania: Stackpole Books. ISBN 0-8117-2038-1.
- Grazulis, Thomas P. (2001). The tornado : nature's ultimate windstorm. Norman, Oklahoma: University of Oklahoma Press. ISBN 0-8061-3258-2.
- Klyza, Christopher McGrory (2001). Wilderness Comes Home: Rewilding the Northeast. Hanover, New Hampshire: Middlebury College Press / University Press of New England. ISBN 1-58465-101-6.
- MacDonald, Sam A. (2005). The agony of an American wilderness: loggers, environmentalists, and the struggle for control of a forgotten forest. Lanham [u.a.]: Rowman & Littlefield. ISBN 0-7425-4157-6.
- McGeehan, Dennis (2007). Elk County. Images of America. Charleston, South Carolina: Arcadia Publishing. ISBN 978-0-7385-5479-2.
- Meginness, John Franklin (1892). "Chapter XIII. Lycoming County Organized.". History of Lycoming County, Pennsylvania: including its aboriginal history; the colonial and revolutionary periods; early settlement and subsequent growth; organization and civil administration; the legal and medical professions; internal improvement; past and present history of Williamsport; manufacturing and lumber interests; religious, educational, and social development; geology and agriculture; military record; sketches of boroughs, townships, and villages; portraits and biographies of pioneers and representative citizens, etc. etc (1st ed.). Chicago, Illinois: Brown, Runk & Co. ISBN 0-7884-0428-8. Note: ISBN refers to the Heritage Books July 1996 reprint. URL is to a scan of the 1892 version with some OCR typos.
- Mitchell, Jeff (2005). Backpacking Pennsylvania: 37 Great Hikes. Mechanicsburg, Pennsylvania: Stackpole Books. ISBN 0-8117-3180-4.
- Owlett, Steven E. (1993). "The Death of a Forest". Seasons Along the Tiadaghton: An Environmental History of the Pine Creek Gorge (1st ed.). Petaluma, California: Interprint. pp. 53–62. ISBN 0-9635905-0-2.
- Paige, John C. (1985). "Chapter One: A Brief History of the Civilian Conservation Corps". The Civilian Conservation Corps and the National Park Service, 1933–1942: An Administrative History. Washington, D.C.: U.S. National Park Service, Department of the Interior. OCLC 12072830.
- Sayers, John A. (1996). Mosquito Creek Sportsmen's Association and Quehanna Wild Area (Complements in History). Frenchville, Pennsylvania: Mosquito Creek Sportsmen's Association. OCLC 38264268.
- Shultz, Charles H., ed. (1999). The Geology of Pennsylvania. Harrisburg and Pittsburgh, Pennsylvania: Pennsylvania Geological Society and Pittsburgh Geological Society. ISBN 0-8182-0227-0.
- Seeley, Ralph (1997). Great Buffaloe Swamp: A Trail Guide and Historical Record for the Quehanna Plateau and the Moshannon State Forest (Second ed.). Karthaus, Pennsylvania: Quehanna Area Trails Club. OCLC 60335051. Note: OCLC refers to the third edition.
- Shaw, Lewis C. (June 1984). Pennsylvania Gazetteer of Streams Part II (Water Resources Bulletin No. 16). Prepared in Cooperation with the United States Department of the Interior Geological Survey (1st ed.). Harrisburg, Pennsylvania: Commonwealth of Pennsylvania, Department of Environmental Resources. OCLC 17150333.
- Speakman, Joseph M. (2006). At Work in Penn's Woods: The Civilian Conservation Corps in Pennsylvania. University Park, Pennsylvania: Pennsylvania State University Press. ISBN 978-0-271-02876-7.
- Stranahan, Susan Q. (1993). Susquehanna, River of Dreams. Baltimore: Johns Hopkins University Press. ISBN 0-8018-4602-1.
- Taber III, Thomas T (1995). "Chapter Two: The Boom — Making It All Possible". Williamsport Lumber Capital (1st ed.). Montoursville, Pennsylvania: Paulhamus Litho, Inc. OCLC 35920715.
- Thorpe, R.R. (1997). The Crown Jewel of Pennsylvania: The State Forest System. Pennsylvania Forestry Association, Pennsylvania Department of Conservation and Natural Resources and the U.S. Forest Service. OCLC 37033507.
- Thwaites, Tom (1992). Fifty Hikes in Central Pennsylvania (Fourth updated printing ed.). Woodstock, Vermont: Backcountry Publications. ISBN 0-942440-24-2.
- Van Diver, Bradford B. (1990). Roadside Geology of Pennsylvania. Missoula, Montana: Mountain Press Publishing Company. ISBN 0-87842-227-7.
- Wallace, Paul A. W. (2000) [1961]. Indians in Pennsylvania. Harrisburg, Pennsylvania: Commonwealth of Pennsylvania, The Pennsylvania Historical and Museum Commission. ISBN 978-0-89271-017-1.
- Wallace, Paul A. W. (1987). Indian Paths of Pennsylvania (Fourth Printing ed.). Harrisburg, Pennsylvania: Pennsylvania Historical and Museum Commission. ISBN 0-89271-090-X. Note: ISBN refers to 1998 impression.
- Young, John L. (2008). Hiking Pennsylvania: 55 of the State's Greatest Hiking Adventures. Falcon Guide: Where to Hike. Guilford, Connecticut: Morris Book Publishing / Globe Pequot Books. ISBN 978-0-7627-4450-3.
