= Robert Dean =

Robert Dean may refer to:

== Arts and Entertainment ==
- Robert George Dean (died 1989), American author of detective fiction
- Robert Dean Smith (born 1958), American tenor
- Rob Dean (born 1955), British musician

== Politics ==
- Robert Dean (Australian politician) (born 1952), former member of the Victorian Legislative Assembly
- Robert Dean (Canadian politician) (1927–2021), Canadian politician
- Robert Dean (Michigan politician) (born 1954), American politician from the state of Michigan
- Robert P. Dean (1909–1984), Maryland politician
- Robert William Dean (1920–2014), American diplomat
- Robert W. Dean (1923–1999), Wisconsin jurist and legislator
- Robert Aaron Dean (1836–?), state legislator in Mississippi
- Bobby Dean (born 1989 or 1990), British politician

== Sports ==
- Robert Dean (baseball) (1915–1970), Negro league baseball player
- Robert Dean (footballer) (born 1950), Australian rules player
- Robert Dean (handballer) (1955–2023), American Olympic handball player
- Bob Dean (1929–2007), Canadian Football League kicker
- Bobby Dean (baseball), Negro league baseball player

== Others ==
- Robert Dean (ufologist) (1929–2018), American UFOlogist

== See also ==
- Robert Deane (disambiguation)
- Robert Deans (disambiguation)
- Dean Roberts (born 1975), New Zealand musician
- Bobby Deen (born 1970), American chef and businessman
