= M.K. Goddard/Wykoff Run Natural Area =

Part of Pennsylvania's state forest

- IUCN category V (protected landscape/seascape)
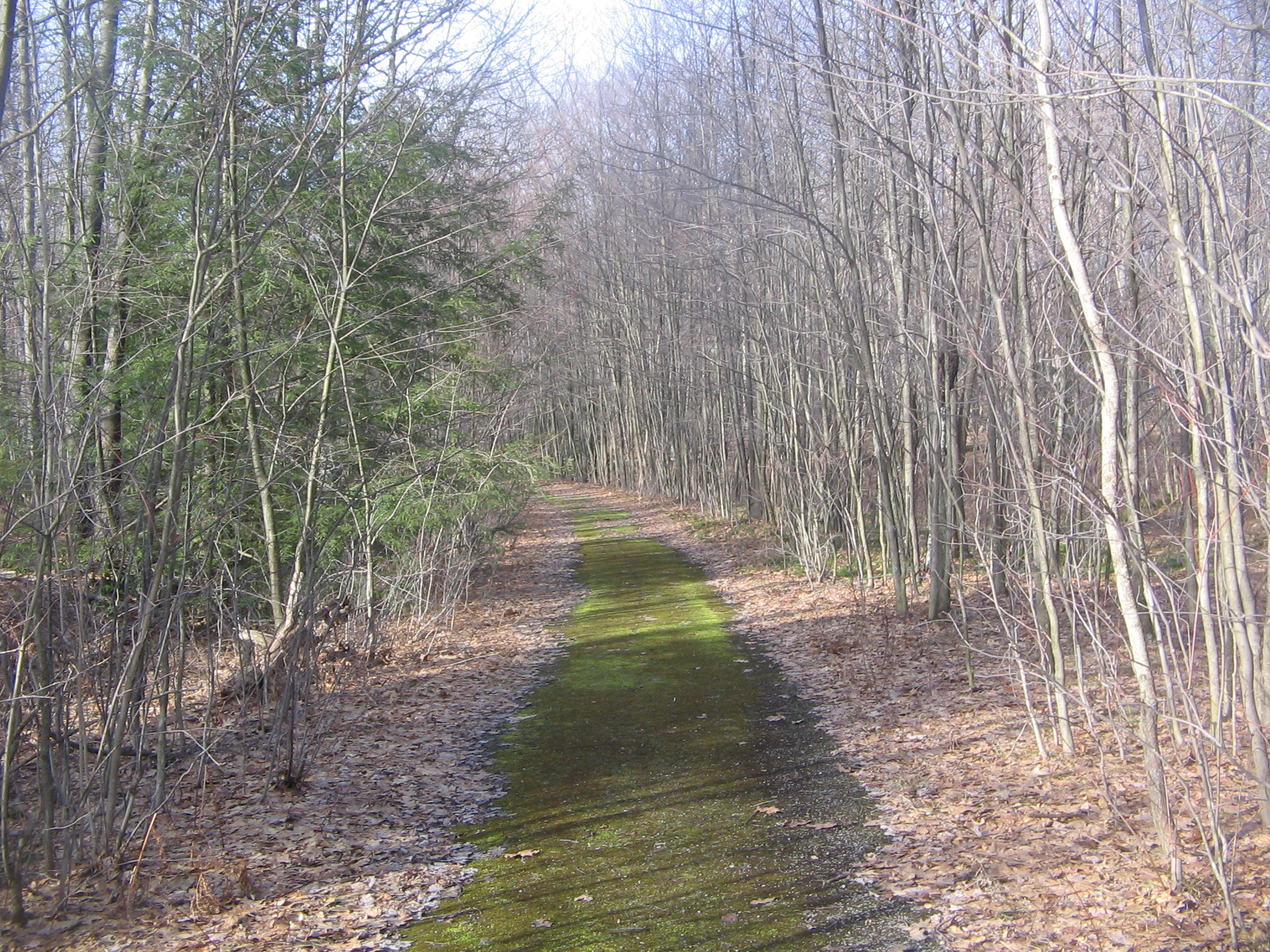
- A former industrial road in M.K. Goddard/Wykoff Run Natural Area

- Location within Pennsylvania
- Location: Cameron County, Pennsylvania, Pennsylvania
- Nearest town: Karthaus
- Coordinates: 41°13′58″N 78°11′44″W
- Area: 1,215 acres (4.92 km^{2})
- Elevation: 2,024 ft (617 m)
- Established: 1965
- Named for: Wykoff Run, Maurice K. Goddard
- Governing body: Pennsylvania Department of Conservation and Natural Resources
- Website: Wykoff Run Natural Area

M.K. Goddard/Wykoff Run Natural Area is a state forest natural area in the Elk State Forest in Gibson Township, Cameron County in the U.S. state of Pennsylvania. The 1,215-acre (492 ha) natural area is in the center of Quehanna Wild Area. It was once home to two jet engine testing cells, when the area was a research facility for Curtiss-Wright Corporation from 1955 to 1960.

The tract was originally known as simply Wykoff Run Natural Area. The name of Maurice K. Goddard was added in the 2010s as part of a project to commemorate his contributions to wilderness management in Pennsylvania.
