= Quehanna Trail =

Hiking trail in Pennsylvania, United States

Coordinates: 41.1925593°N 78.5039106°W

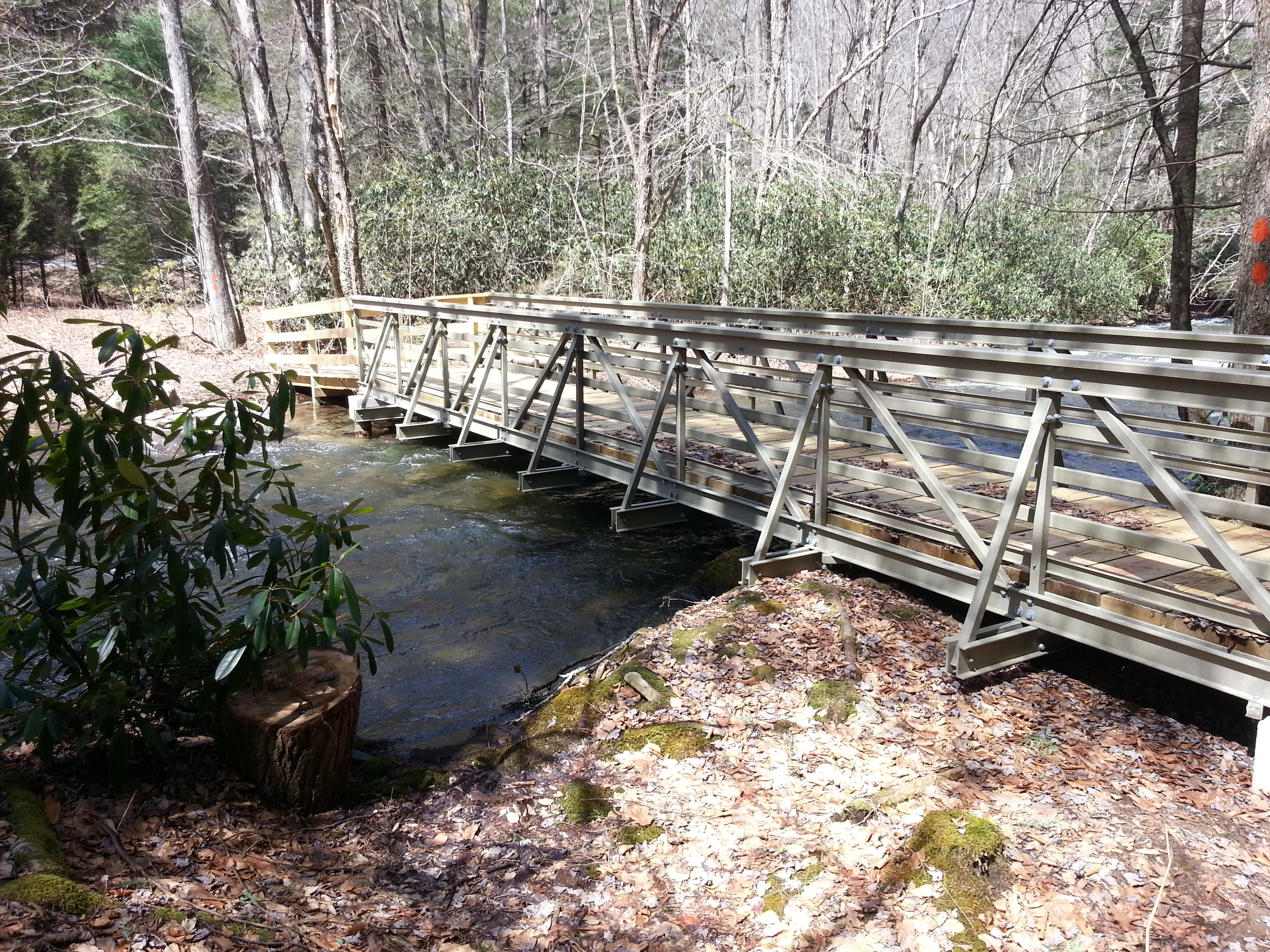
- The Quehanna Trail's bridge over Wykoff Run, on the eastern segment of the loop.
- Length: 73.7 mi (118.6 km)
- Location: Clearfield County, Cameron County, and Elk County, Pennsylvania, US
- Trailheads: Parker Dam State Park
- Use: Hiking
- Elevation change: High
- Difficulty: Strenuous
- Season: Year-round
- Hazards: Uneven and wet terrain, rattlesnakes, mosquitoes, ticks, black bears

The Quehanna Trail is a 73.7-mile (118.6 km) hiking trail in north-central Pennsylvania, forming a loop through Moshannon State Forest and Elk State Forest. For about 34 miles, the trail traverses Quehanna Wild Area, and its main trailhead is at Parker Dam State Park. It also passes through two State Game Lands. There are also three cross-connector trails allowing shorter loop hikes of various lengths. A spur trail leads to the village of Wyside where the hiker can, via some relatively brief road walking, reach the western terminus of the Donut Hole Trail. The Quehanna Trail is known for visiting numerous vistas and a wide variety of landscapes, including open meadows that are relatively rare for this region of Pennsylvania, plus steep stream hollows, high plateau-tops, and several different forest ecosystems.

== History ==
The Quehanna Trail was built in 1976-77 by workers who were members of a federal jobs program for welfare recipients, in addition to workers from the Youth and Adult Conservation Corps and the Pennsylvania Conservation Corps. Its length has been significantly altered several times in the years since. In 1985, the western portion of the loop near Saunders Run was severely damaged by an outbreak of tornadoes, necessitating a temporary relocation of the hiking route onto nearby dirt roads until 2001. In 2016, another significant relocation became necessary at Medix Run due to a failed footbridge. Several relocations involving another failed footbridge and unstable topography have been necessary at the Corporation Dam site on Mosquito Creek.

== Route ==
The route of the Quehanna Trail has traditionally been described in the counter-clockwise direction. The main trailhead is at Parker Dam State Park in northern Clearfield County. The trailhead features some relics from the history of logging in the region. The trail proceeds southeast, first through the grounds of the state park. At 1.4 miles there is a junction with a trail that leads south about six miles to Simon B. Elliott State Park. At 3.5 miles, reach a junction with the 1.7 mile-long Cutoff Trail, one of the system's cross-connectors that can be used to form a short loop in and near Parker Dam State Park. The junction with the next such trail, the West Cross Connector Trail, is reached at 5.0 miles; that trail heads north for 6.3 miles, with a significant vista near its northern end, and returns to the Quehanna Trail near Little Medix Run.

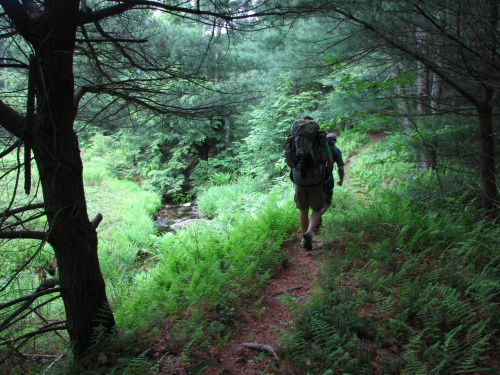
A backpacker on the Quehanna Trail.

The Quehanna Trail crosses the historic Caledonia Pike at 14.3 miles, then reaches Gifford Run at the site of an old splash dam at 15.3 miles. The trail enters Quehanna Wild Area at 18.1 miles and remains in this protected district for about the next 34 miles. A junction with the East Cross Connector Trail is reached at 20.2 miles; that trail heads north for 9.4 miles, passes through several high meadows and junctions with short cross-country skiing trails, and returns to the Quehanna Trail at the unpaved Losey Road.

At 21.9 miles the Quehanna Trail passes a historical monument of dubious authenticity called Wild Cat Rock, and then begins a significant plunge into a canyon formed by Mosquito Creek. At 24.2 miles, the trail enters an area of unstable ground that was formed by mud at the bottom of a defunct artificial lake that was in turn formed by a large splash dam that was built in approximately 1870 and dismantled just a few years later. The unstable topography creates an unusual landscape of mini-canyons dug into the loose soil by Mosquito Creek and its incoming tributaries. The trail reaches the site of several failed footbridges over Mosquito Creek at 24.4 miles. The bridges failed due to the unstable soil below their support piers; the most recent failed in 2011 and has not yet been replaced as of 2026, creating a potentially hazardous wet crossing of the creek.

The Quehanna Trail passes the site of the former Corporation Dam at 24.6 miles and then climbs strenuously back out of the canyon. The paved Quehanna Highway is crossed at 30.2 miles, near the small industrial complex known as Piper. Now trending to the northeast then north, a junction with the Old Sinnemahoning Trail is reached at 39.9 miles; that trail leads northeast 4.3 miles to the village of Wyside, near a junction (via road) with the Donut Hole Trail. The Quehanna Trail then descends into another steep canyon and crosses the paved Wykoff Run Road at 41.5 miles. After another significant climb back to the top of the plateau, the trail heads west and passes near the border of Marion Brooks Natural Area (where no trails are allowed) at 52.7 miles.

The trail crosses Quehanna Highway for the second time at 62.62 miles. Starting at the 63.6 mile point, the trail was rerouted in 2016 to avoid the site of several failed footbridges (caused by storms) at Medix Run; to the south, the Quehanna Trail has assumed a former portion of the West Cross Connector Trail. The current junction with that trail is reached at 65.1 miles. The Quehanna Trail turns south onto Saunders Road at 68.3 miles, and at 68.9 miles walks through a hollow that was severely damaged by tornadoes in 1985 but has since recovered. The trail then returns to the trailhead at Parker Dam State Park, ending the loop after 73.7 miles.
