= Stackpole Books =

Book publisher

- Parent company: Globe Pequot Publishing Group
- Founded: 1930
- Founder: E. J. Stackpole Jr.
- Country of origin: United States
- Headquarters location: Mechanicsburg, Pennsylvania, U.S.
- Publication types: Books
- Nonfiction topics: fly fishing, outdoor sports, nature, military history, military reference
- Imprints: Stackpole Books, Headwater Books, Ryton Books
- Official website: www.stackpolebooks.com

Stackpole Books is a trade publishing company in Mechanicsburg, Pennsylvania. It was founded by Edward J. Stackpole in Harrisburg, Pennsylvania, in 1930 and was moved to its current headquarters in 1993. Stackpole publishes nonfiction books in the areas of crafts, outdoors, regional and travel, military history, and military reference. The current CEO is M. David Detweiler, and the Publisher and Editorial Director is Judith Schnell. The company is part of Globe Pequot Publishing Group.

== History ==
The publishing company that became Stackpole Books has its origins with the Evening Telegraph in Harrisburg, Pennsylvania, which was founded in the early 19th century. In 1901, controlling interest in the Telegraph Press was acquired by E. J. Stackpole Sr. The business was carried on by Stackpole's son, Edward J. Stackpole Jr., a decorated general in World War I who received the Distinguished Service Cross, the Silver Star, and three Purple Hearts.

In 1930, the National Service Publishing Company, based in Washington, D.C. and established in 1921, was acquired by Telegraph. Renamed Military Service Publishing Company. It published textbooks for the military services, including Army Officer’s Guide, which is still in print in an updated edition by Stackpole Books.

Also in 1930, E. J. Stackpole Jr. and his brother Albert Stackpole began a trade company called Stackpole Sons, with additional offices in New York City. Stackpole Sons published books starting in 1936 on a variety of subjects, including fiction by Damon Runyon and John Fante and autobiographies by Benny Goodman and Huey Long. Both Military Service Publishing Company and Stackpole Sons were divisions of Telegraph Press. A brief merger of Stackpole Sons with the Heck Company in the 1940s resulted in the short-lived Stackpole & Heck. After the union dissolved, the trade division became the Stackpole Company.

During World War II, Military Services Publishing Company produced small, inexpensive paperback reprints of fiction titles for soldiers. About twice the size of Armed Services Editions (ASEs), these books were still small enough to carry easily in military uniform cargo pockets. These "Superior Reprints" complemented the ASE titles and leaned toward mystery and detective fiction. Like the ASEs, these books were entertaining and noncontroversial in content; but, unlike the ASEs, they were not free to the soldiers.

In the 1950s, Stackpole developed a strong emphasis on nonfiction books, especially outdoors and history titles. In outdoors, the house published several successful and well-regarded works by wilderness survivalist Bradford Angier, including Feasting Free on Wild Edibles, Field Guide to Edible Wild Plants, Field Guide to Medicinal Wild Plants, and Looking for Gold, all of which are still in print today in new editions. E. J. Stackpole Jr. himself was an esteemed author of American Civil War history; his popular titles for the house are They Met at Gettysburg, The Fredericksburg Campaign, Chancellorsville, and Sheridan in the Shenandoah.

In 1959, Stackpole and Military Service merged into a single company, Stackpole Books. In recent years, the house has continued publishing in military reference, history, and outdoors. Stackpole has been especially noted for their books on fly fishing. New lines include crafts, regional, and travel books.

In 2015, Stackpole Books was bought by Rowman & Littlefield. Stackpole Magazines were sold to Ampry Publishing in 2016. Stackpole books became part of Rowman & Littlefield's Globe Pequot group. In 2024, Rowman & Littlefield's academic books division was sold to Bloomsbury Publishing, along with the Rowman & Littlefield name. Globe Pequot was renamed Globe Pequot Publishing Group.

== Superior Reprints ==
Military Services Publishing Company produced a series of paperback books called "Superior Reprints" in 1944 and 1945. Twenty-one titles were published in this series, consecutively numbered from M637 to M657. Each book was priced at 25¢. The complete series of Superior Reprints consists of:

- (M637) White Magic by Faith Baldwin
- (M638) Ol' Man Adam an' His Chillun by Roark Bradford
- (M639) Unexpected Night by Elizabeth Daly
- (M640) An April Afternoon by Philip Wylie
- (M641) Family Affair by Ione Sandberg Shriber
- (M642) The Rynox Murder Mystery by Philip MacDonald
- (M643) Cartoons by George Price
- (M644) Embarrassment of Riches by Marjorie Fischer
- (M645) Murder in Mink by Robert George Dean
- (M646) The Love Nest and Other Stories by Ring Lardner
- (M647) Inquest by Percival Wilde
- (M648) One Foot in Heaven by Hartzell Spence
- (M649) The Navy Colt by Frank Gruber
- (M650) The Informer by Liam O'Flaherty
- (M651) Mr. Angel Comes Aboard by Charles G. Booth
- (M652) This Gun for Hire by Graham Greene
- (M653) The House Without the Door by Elizabeth Daly
- (M654) On Ice by Robert George Dean
- (M655) The Mighty Blockhead by Frank Gruber
- (M656) A Saki Sampler by H. H. Munro
- (M657) Good Night, Sheriff by Harrison R. Steeves
