= Robert Deane =

Robert Deane may refer to:

- Sir Robert Deane, 5th Baronet (c. 1707–1770), Irish MP for Carysfort and Tallow
- Robert Deane, 1st Baron Muskerry (1745–1818), his son, Irish MP for Carysfort and Cork County

== See also ==
- Robert Dean (disambiguation)
- Robert Deans (disambiguation)
