= Robert Deans =

Robert Deans is the name of:

- Bob Deans (1884–1908), New Zealand rugby union player,
- Robbie Deans (born 1959), New Zealand rugby union coach and former player

== See also ==
- Robert Dean (disambiguation)
- Robert Deane (disambiguation)
