= Mosquito Creek (Pennsylvania) =

River in Pennsylvania, US

Coordinates: 41°07′04″N 78°06′35″W

Mosquito Creek is a 21.8-mile-long (35.1 km) tributary of the West Branch Susquehanna River in central Pennsylvania in the United States.

Mosquito Creek joins the West Branch Susquehanna River at the township of Karthaus.

== See also ==
- List of rivers of Pennsylvania
