= Robert George Dean =

American novelist

- Died: 1989
- Occupation: Author
- Writing career
- Period: 1938–1954
- Genre: Detective fiction

Robert George Dean (died 1989) was an American author of detective fiction. He also worked as a journalist, and as an ambulance driver during World War II.

The last few books Dean wrote, under the pseudonym George Griswold, are spy novels that still have a certain fan following. A character known as Mr. Groode, a shadowy British spymaster, figures in all four novels, but his prominence in the plot varies widely from book to book.

== Works ==
Tony Hunter series

- Murder Makes a Merry Widow (1938)
- A Murder of Convenience (1938)
- Murder Through the Looking Glass (1940)
- A Murder by Marriage (1940)
- Murder in Mink (1941)
- Layoff (1942)
- On Ice (1942)
- The Body Was Quite Cold (Dutton, 1951)
- The Case of Joshua Locke (Dutton, 1951)
- Affair at Lover's Leap (aka Death at Lover's Leap) (Doubleday's Crime Club, 1953)

other

- Murder Most Opportune
- Murder on Margin
- Three Lights Went Out
- What Gentleman Strangles a Lady
- The Sutton Place Murders

He also wrote four books under the pseudonym George Griswold:

- A Checkmate for the Colonel (1952)
- A Gambit for Mr. Groode (1953)
- Red Pawns (1954)
- The Pinned Man (1954)

== Sources ==
- http://www.thrillingdetective.com/hunter2.html
- On Ice (Superior Reprint, 1945)
