= Maurice K. Goddard =

American politician

Secretary of the Pennsylvania Department of Forests and Waters
- In office 1955–1970
- Preceded by: Samuel S. Lewis
- Succeeded by: Position eliminated

Secretary of the Pennsylvania Department of Environmental Resources
- In office 1970–1979
- Preceded by: Position created
- Succeeded by: Clifford L. Jones

Personal details
- Born: September 13, 1912 Lowell, Massachusetts, U.S.
- Died: September 14, 1995 Camp Hill, Pennsylvania, U.S.
- Profession: Pennsylvania state public official

Maurice K. Goddard (September 13, 1912 – September 14, 1995) was the driving force behind the creation of 45 Pennsylvania state parks during his 24 years as a cabinet officer for six governors of the Commonwealth of Pennsylvania.

Goddard was born on September 13, 1912, in Lowell, Massachusetts. His family moved around during his childhood so that he lived in Kansas and Toronto, Ontario, Canada before finally settling in Portland, Maine. Goddard received a B.S. in forestry from the University of Maine in 1935. He held a teaching position in forestry at The Mont Alto School of Forestry in Franklin County, Pennsylvania, from 1935 to 1937. He left in 1938 to receive his master's degree in forestry from the University of California at Berkeley. He served under the direct command of General Dwight D. Eisenhower in the United States Army during World War II, reaching the rank of lieutenant colonel. He was awarded the Legion of Merit and the Bronze Star.

Following his discharge from the army, Goddard returned to his career in forestry. He accepted a position as the director of forestry at The Mont Alto School of Forestry. From there he served the same position at the Pennsylvania State University in University Park, Pennsylvania. At this time Goddard began to formulate plans for the future of the state parks in Pennsylvania. George M. Leader was elected governor of Pennsylvania in 1954 and sought Goddard's advice about who should lead the Pennsylvania Department of Forests and Waters. After receiving Goddard's advice, Governor Leader instead appointed Goddard as the secretary of the Pennsylvania Department of Forests and Waters, a forerunner to the Pennsylvania Department of Conservation and Natural Resources.

As secretary, Goddard set out to improve the forest department by eliminating political appointees and increasing the number of college-educated employees. With his new group of employees, Goddard and the Department of Forests and Waters set a goal of establishing a state park within 25 miles (40 km) of every resident of Pennsylvania. He fell short of this goal, but under his leadership the number of state parks in Pennsylvania grew by 45, and there was an increase in size of over 130,000 acres (526 km²).

Goddard went on to oversee the creation of the Pennsylvania Department of Environmental Resources, a combination of several other state departments. Goddard retired in 1979 and remained active in the environmental movement, serving on the boards of the Chesapeake Bay Foundation, National Wildlife Federation, Pennsylvania Environmental Council, and Pennsylvania Forestry Association. He died on September 14, 1995, at age 83, from injuries received in a fire at his home in Camp Hill, Pennsylvania. Though not well known, many friends and people who knew him well acknowledge it was likely suicide, as the fire was fueled by a petroleum reactant. Goddard was survived by his wife, Ethel, who was also injured in the fire. They had two sons: Kim and Mark.

== Awards and honors ==
- Bronze Star
- Legion of Merit
- National Wildlife Federation Special Achievement Award
- 1989 Pennsylvania Conservationist of the Year Award from the Pennsylvania Wildlife Federation, the educational arm of what is today the Pennsylvania Federation of Sportsmen and Conservationists.
- Maurice K. Goddard State Park in Mercer County, Pennsylvania
- The Maurice K. Goddard Chair in Forestry and Environmental Resource Conservation at the Pennsylvania State University
- The Susquehanna River Basin Commission awards the Maurice K. Goddard Award "for individuals who demonstrate excellence in the field of water management"
- The 1994 Alumni Career Award of the University of Maine Alumni Association
- A historical marker honoring him was placed at the Rachel Carson State Office building which is the headquarters for the Pennsylvania Department of Conservation and Natural Resources and the Department of Environmental Protection in Harrisburg. The marked was unveiled in 2010.
