= Clearfield Area Junior/Senior High School =

Public school in Pennsylvania, US

Coordinates: 40.9929°N 78.4825°W

- 2831 Washington Avenue; Clearfield, Pennsylvania

Information
- Type: Public
- Motto: Courtesy, Honor, Service
- School district: Clearfield Area School District
- Principal: Heather Prestash
- Staff: 80.95 (FTE)
- Grades: 7-12
- Enrollment: 1,046 (2023-2024)
- Student to teacher ratio: 12.92
- Campus type: Rural
- Colors: Red and Black
- Mascot: Benny the Bison, modeled after the American bison

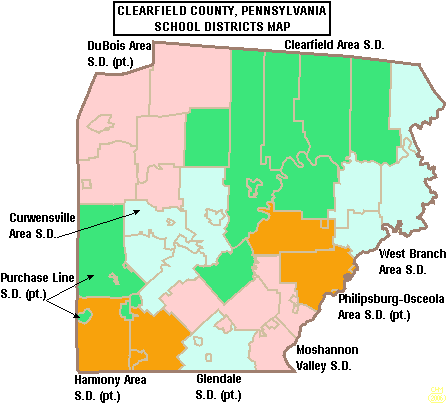
Map of Clearfield County, Pennsylvania Public School Districts

Clearfield Area Junior/Senior High School is a public high school located near the village of Hyde, Pennsylvania. Clearfield Area Junior/Senior High School serves students from most of central and north central Clearfield County. The school's mascot is the bison, modeled after the American bison. Clearfield Area High School is part of the Clearfield Area School District. In the 2018–2019 school year, the Clearfield Area High School had 1,001 pupils enrolled in grades 9th through 12th. As of the 2014-15 school season, the high school was made into a larger campus, now serving students from 7th through 12th grades.

== Extracurriculars ==
The district offers a variety of clubs, activities and an extensive sports program.

=== Sports ===
- Boys
  - Baseball
  - Basketball
  - Cross Country
  - Football
  - Golf
  - Soccer
  - Swimming & Diving
  - Tennis
  - Track
  - Wrestling
- Girls
  - Basketball
  - Cheerleading
  - Soccer
  - Softball
  - Swimming & Diving
  - Tennis
  - Track
  - Volleyball

Clearfield is well known for its athletics. Clearfield's wrestling program has a notable 41 state champions, the most of any PIAA school, with the most recent being Luke McGonigal in 2018.

== Notable alumni ==
- Howard Fargo, (class of 1946), member of the Pennsylvania House of Representatives from 1981-2000. Served as Republican Caucus Chairman 1995-2000.
