= Covington Township, Pennsylvania =

Covington Township is the name of some places in the U.S. state of Pennsylvania:

- Covington Township, Clearfield County, Pennsylvania
- Covington Township, Lackawanna County, Pennsylvania
- Covington Township, Tioga County, Pennsylvania
