= Lawrence Township, Clearfield County, Pennsylvania =

Township in Pennsylvania, US

Coordinates: 41°11′00″N 78°27′29″W

- Township
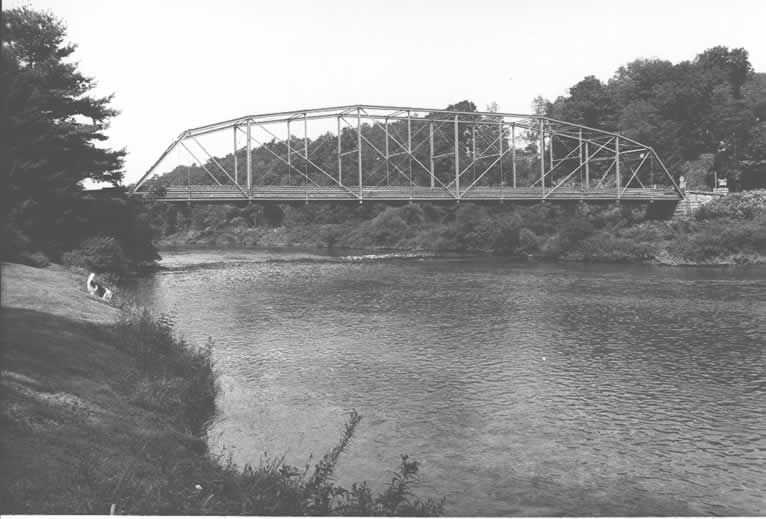
- The Hogback Bridge over the West Branch Susquehanna River

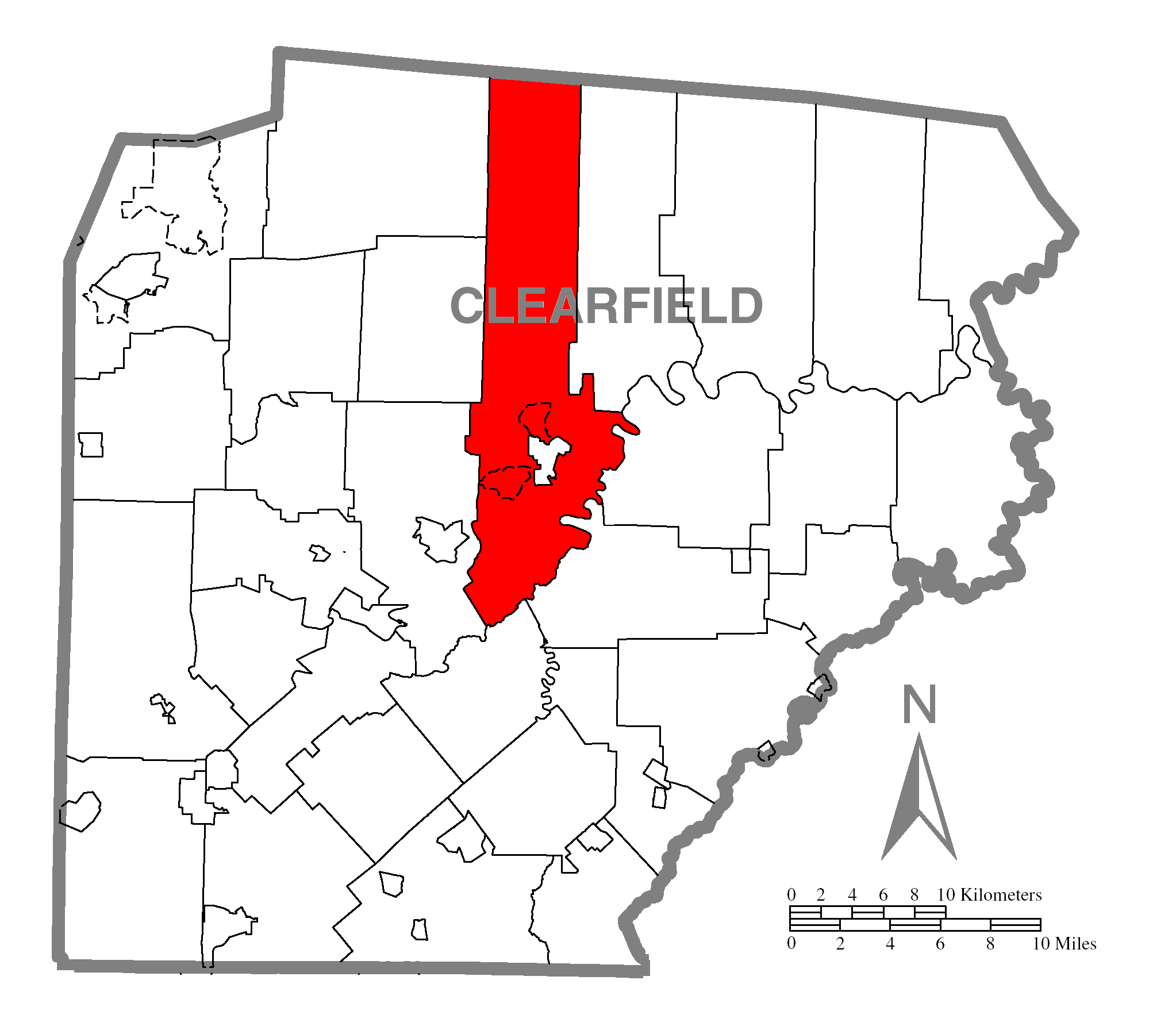
- Map of Clearfield County, Pennsylvania highlighting Lawrence Township

- Map of Clearfield County, Pennsylvania
- Country: United States
- State: Pennsylvania
- County: Clearfield
- Settled: 1797
- Incorporated: 1813

Area
  - Total: 83.25 sq mi (215.62 km^{2})
  - Land: 82.54 sq mi (213.79 km^{2})
  - Water: 0.71 sq mi (1.83 km^{2})

Population (2020)
  - Total: 7,503 ▼
  - Estimate (2021): 7,459
  - Density: 93.2/sq mi (35.97/km^{2})
- Time zone: UTC-5 (Eastern (EST))
  - Summer (DST): UTC-4 (EDT)
- Area code: 814
- FIPS code: 42-033-41952
- Website: https://www.lawrencepa.gov/

Lawrence Township is a township in Clearfield County, Pennsylvania, United States. The population was 7,503 at the 2020 census. Lawrence Township borders the townships of Boggs, Bradford, Goshen, Huston, Knox, Pike and Pine in Clearfield County, as well as Benezette and Jay Townships in Elk County to the north. Lawrence Township borders the borough of Clearfield as well.

== Consolidation ==
In October 2015, a Clearfield/Lawrence Township Consolidation Committee first convened to discuss a potential merger between Lawrence Township and Clearfield. However, on August 1, 2017, Lawrence Township supervisors voted 2 to 1 against consolidation with Clearfield. The population of the new municipality would have been approximately 13,800, surpassing DuBois as the most populous community in the county.

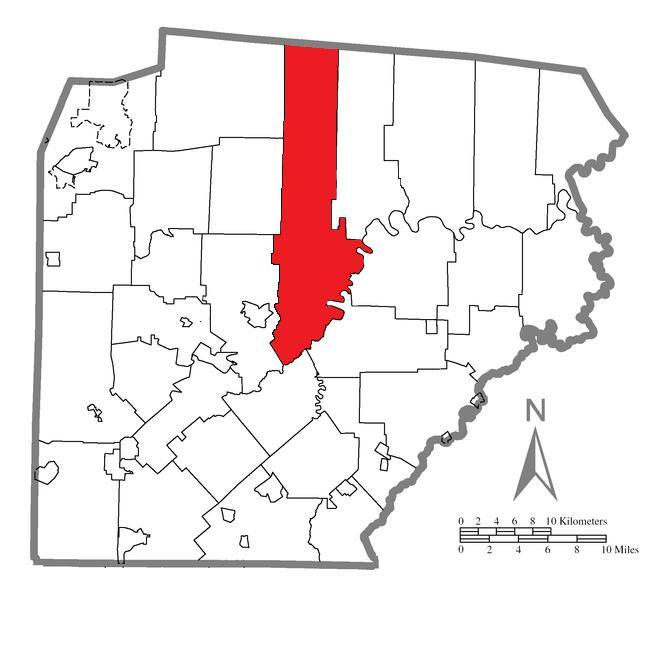
Location of the newly proposed municipality in Clearfield County in the year 2020.

== Geography ==
According to the United States Census Bureau, the township has a total area of 83.7 square miles (217 km^{2}), of which 83.1 square miles (215 km^{2}) is land and 0.6 square miles (1.6 km^{2}) (0.72%) is water.

== Communities ==
- Baney Settlement
- Dimeling
- Glen Richey
- Hillsdale
- Hyde
- Kerr Addition
- Mount Hope
- Mt. Joy
- Mt. Zion
- Oshanter
- Pine Grove
- Plymptonville
- Riverview
- Susquehanna Bridge
- Weaverhurst

== Demographics ==
Historical population
Census	Pop.	Note	%±
2000	7,712		—
2010	7,681		−0.4%
2020	7,503		−2.3%
2021 (est.)	7,459		−0.6%
U.S. Decennial Census

As of the census of 2000, there were 7,712 people, 3,070 households, and 2,191 families residing in the township. The population density was 92.8 inhabitants per square mile (35.8/km^{2}). There were 3,401 housing units at an average density of 40.9 per square mile (15.8/km^{2}). The racial makeup of the township was 98.64% White, 0.40% African American, 0.17% Native American, 0.30% Asian, 0.05% from other races, and 0.44% from two or more races. Hispanic or Latino of any race were 0.45% of the population.

There were 3,070 households, out of which 28.1% had children under the age of 18 living with them, 55.8% were married couples living together, 11.8% had a female householder with no husband present, and 28.6% were non-families. 25.2% of all households were made up of individuals, and 13.2% had someone living alone who was 65 years of age or older. The average household size was 2.39 and the average family size was 2.84.

In the township the population was spread out, with 21.7% under the age of 18, 6.9% from 18 to 24, 26.2% from 25 to 44, 25.2% from 45 to 64, and 19.9% who were 65 years of age or older. The median age was 41 years. For every 100 females there were 93.4 males. For every 100 females age 18 and over, there were 91.1 males.

The median income for a household in the township was $30,074, and the median income for a family was $37,151. Males had a median income of $29,506 versus $20,250 for females. The per capita income for the township was $16,321. About 11.2% of families and 15.6% of the population were below the poverty line, including 30.7% of those under age 18 and 7.6% of those age 65 or over.

== Education ==
Students in the township attend schools in the Clearfield Area School District.
