= Girard Township, Pennsylvania =

Girard Township is the name of some places in the U.S. state of Pennsylvania:

- Girard Township, Clearfield County, Pennsylvania
- Girard Township, Erie County, Pennsylvania
