= Clearfield Armory =

- U.S. National Register of Historic Places
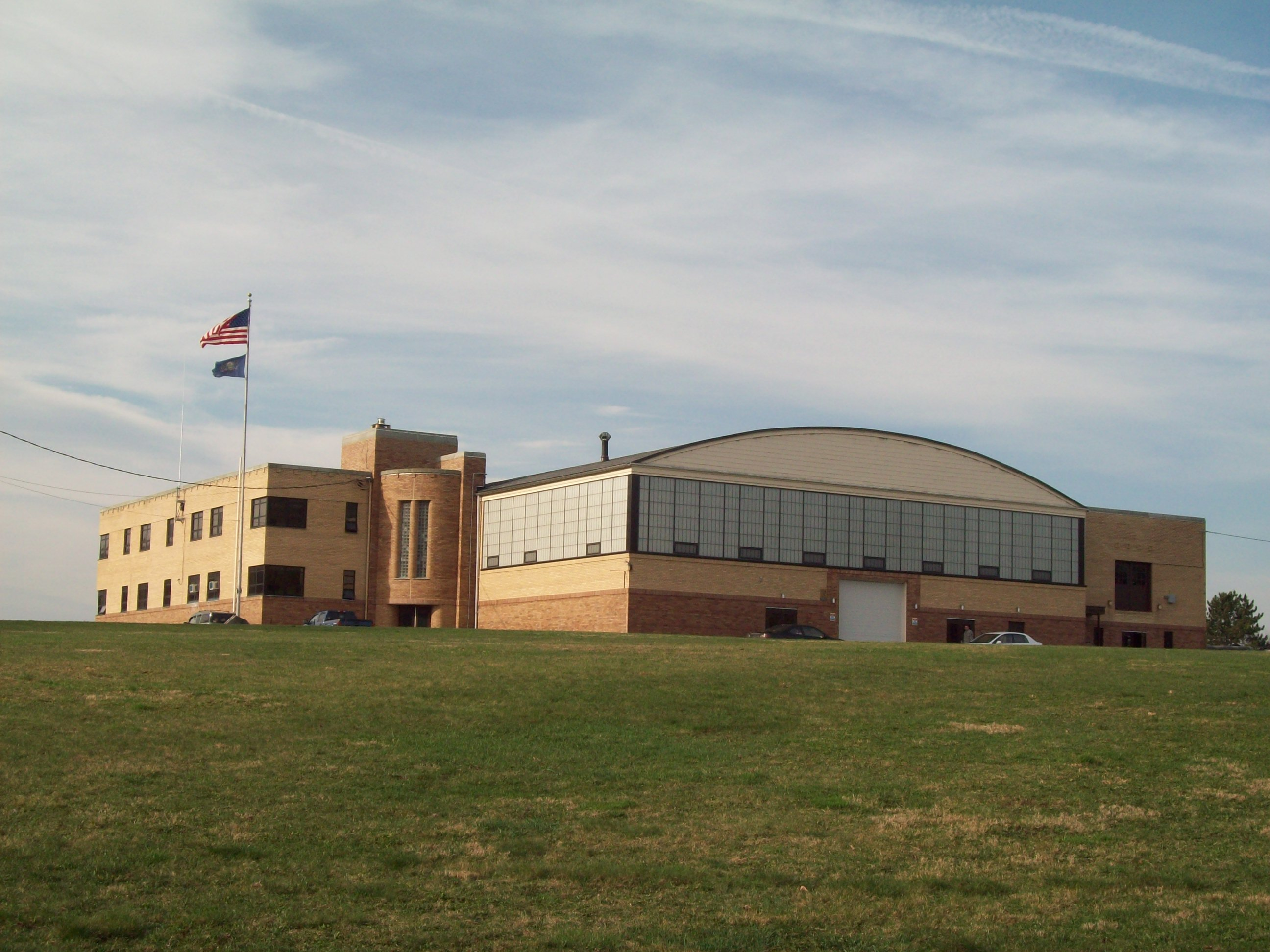
- Clearfield Armory, April 2010

- Location within Pennsylvania Location within the United States
- Location: Coal Hill Rd., Lawrence Township, Pennsylvania
- Coordinates: 41°0′44″N 78°27′45″W
- Built: 1938
- Architect: Howard, R.G.
- Architectural style: Moderne
- MPS: Pennsylvania National Guard Armories MPS
- NRHP reference No.: 89002072
- Added to NRHP: December 22, 1989

Clearfield Armory is a historic National Guard armory located in Lawrence Township, Clearfield County, Pennsylvania, United States. It was built for Troop A, 103rd Cavalry of the Pennsylvania National Guard. It is a two-story brick structure constructed in 1938 in the Moderne style.

It was listed on the National Register of Historic Places in 1989.

== See also ==
- National Register of Historic Places listings in Clearfield County, Pennsylvania
