= Plymptonville, Pennsylvania =

Unincorporated community in Pennsylvania, US

- Census-designated place
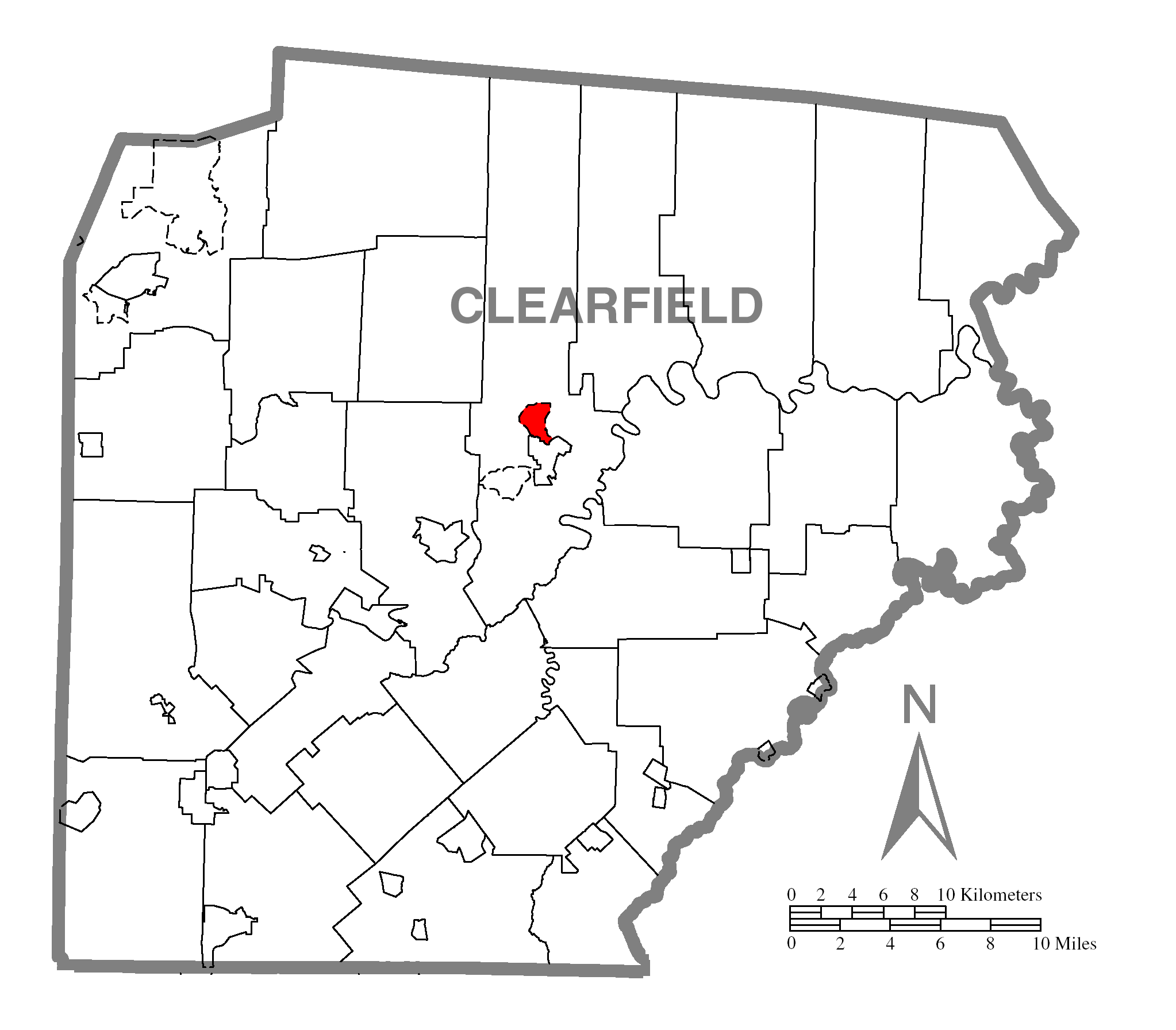
- Location of Plymptonville in Clearfield County

- Location of Clearfield County in Pennsylvania

- Location within the U.S. state of Pennsylvania Plymptonville (the United States)
- Coordinates: 41°2′6″N 78°26′36″W
- Country: United States
- State: Pennsylvania
- County: Clearfield
- Township: Lawrence

Area
  - Total: 1.31 sq mi (3.38 km^{2})
  - Land: 1.30 sq mi (3.36 km^{2})
  - Water: 0.0039 sq mi (0.01 km^{2})
- Elevation: 1,150 ft (350 m)

Population (2020)
  - Total: 972
  - Density: 749.0/sq mi (289.19/km^{2})
- Time zone: UTC-5 (Eastern (EST))
  - Summer (DST): UTC-4 (EDT)
- ZIP code: 16830
- Area code: 814
- FIPS code: 42-61704
- GNIS feature ID: 1867504

Plymptonville is a census-designated place (CDP) in Clearfield County, Pennsylvania, United States. The population was 972 at the 2020 census.

== Geography ==
Plymptonville is located in central Clearfield County at 41°2′6″N 78°26′36″W (41.035098, -78.443200), on the northern border of Clearfield, the county seat. It is part of Lawrence Township. The West Branch Susquehanna River forms part of the border between Plymptonville and Clearfield. U.S. Route 322 passes through the community, leading south into Clearfield and west 20 miles (32 km) to DuBois.

According to the United States Census Bureau, the CDP has a total area of 1.3 square miles (3.4 km^{2}), of which 0.004 square miles (0.01 km^{2}), or 0.42%, is water.

== Demographics ==
Historical population
Year	Pop.	±%
1990	1,074	—
2000	1,040	−3.2%
2010	981	−5.7%
2020	972	−0.9%
Source: U.S. Decennial Census

As of the census of 2000, there were 1,040 people, 457 households, and 301 families living in the CDP. The population density was 796.4 inhabitants per square mile (307.5/km^{2}). There were 495 housing units at an average density of 379.1 per square mile (146.4/km^{2}). The racial makeup of the CDP was 99.42% White, 0.19% African American, 0.10% Native American, and 0.29% from two or more races. Hispanic or Latino of any race were 0.38% of the population.

There were 457 households, out of which 22.3% had children under the age of 18 living with them, 53.0% were married couples living together, 10.1% had a female householder with no husband present, and 34.1% were non-families. 31.5% of all households were made up of individuals, and 16.6% had someone living alone who was 65 years of age or older. The average household size was 2.27 and the average family size was 2.84.

In the CDP, the population was spread out, with 20.3% under the age of 18, 4.9% from 18 to 24, 28.0% from 25 to 44, 25.5% from 45 to 64, and 21.3% who were 65 years of age or older. The median age was 42 years. For every 100 females, there were 86.4 males. For every 100 females age 18 and over, there were 84.6 males.

The median income for a household in the CDP was $25,952, and the median income for a family was $31,250. Males had a median income of $29,706 versus $18,393 for females. The per capita income for the CDP was $13,691. About 11.9% of families and 16.3% of the population were below the poverty line, including 28.2% of those under age 18 and 9.5% of those age 65 or over.
