= Laurel Run (Bennett Branch Sinnemahoning Creek tributary) =

River in Pennsylvania, United States

Coordinates: 41.279227°N 78.457797°W

Laurel Run is a 16.5-mile-long (26.6 km) tributary of the Bennett Branch Sinnemahoning Creek in Clearfield and Elk counties, Pennsylvania in the United States. Via the Bennett Branch, Sinnemahoning Creek, and the West Branch Susquehanna River, it is part of the Susquehanna River watershed flowing to Chesapeake Bay.

Parker Dam in Parker Dam State Park creates 20-acre (8.1 ha) Parker Lake.

Laurel Run continues for 8.3 miles (13.4 km) to join the Bennett Branch of Sinnemahoning Creek near the community of Caledonia.

== See also ==
- List of rivers of Pennsylvania
