= Clearfield County, Pennsylvania =

County in Pennsylvania, United States

- County
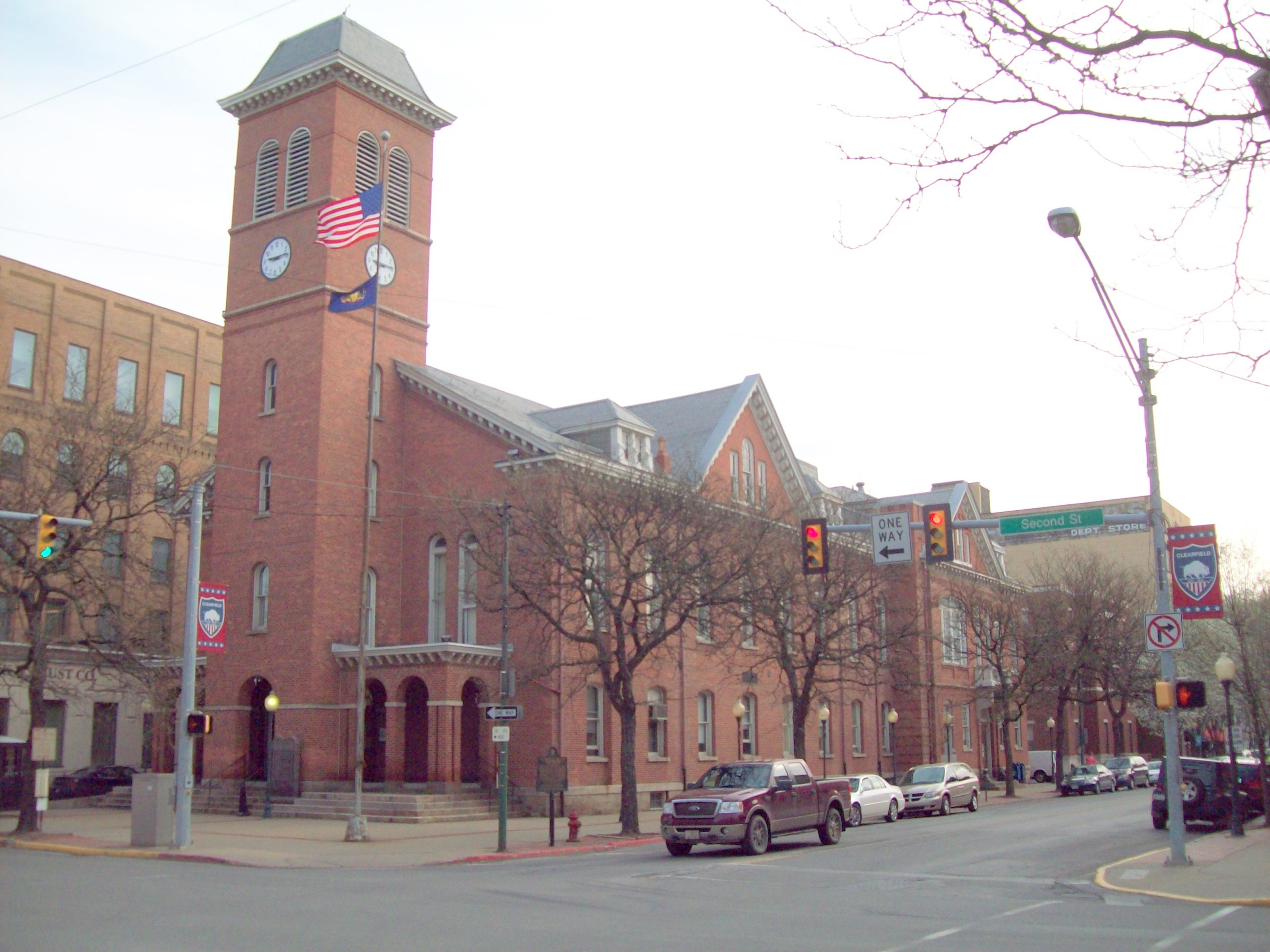
- Clearfield County Courthouse

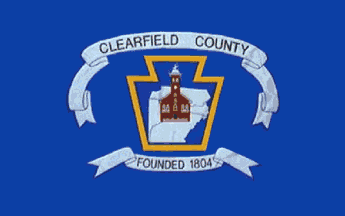
- Flag Seal

- Location within the U.S. state of Pennsylvania
- Coordinates: 41°00′N 78°28′W
- Country: United States
- State: Pennsylvania
- Founded: January 29, 1822
- Seat: Clearfield
- Largest city: DuBois

Area
  - Total: 1,154 sq mi (2,990 km^{2})
  - Land: 1,145 sq mi (2,970 km^{2})

Population (2020)
  - Total: 80,562
  - Estimate (2025): 78,100 ▼
  - Density: 68.2/sq mi (26.3/km^{2})
- Time zone: UTC−5 (Eastern)
  - Summer (DST): UTC−4 (EDT)
- Congressional district: 15th
- Website: clearfieldcountypa.gov

Pennsylvania Historical Marker
- Designated: September 17, 1982

Clearfield County is a county in the Commonwealth of Pennsylvania. As of the 2020 census, the population was 80,562. The county seat is Clearfield, and the largest city is DuBois. The county was created in 1804 and later organized in 1822.

Clearfield County comprises the DuBois, PA Micropolitan Statistical Area, which is also included in the State College–DuBois, PA Combined Statistical Area. The county is part of the North Central region of the commonwealth. (Note: Includes Clearfield, Jefferson, Tioga, McKean, Warren, Clarion, Elk, Potter, Forest and Cameron Counties)

== History ==
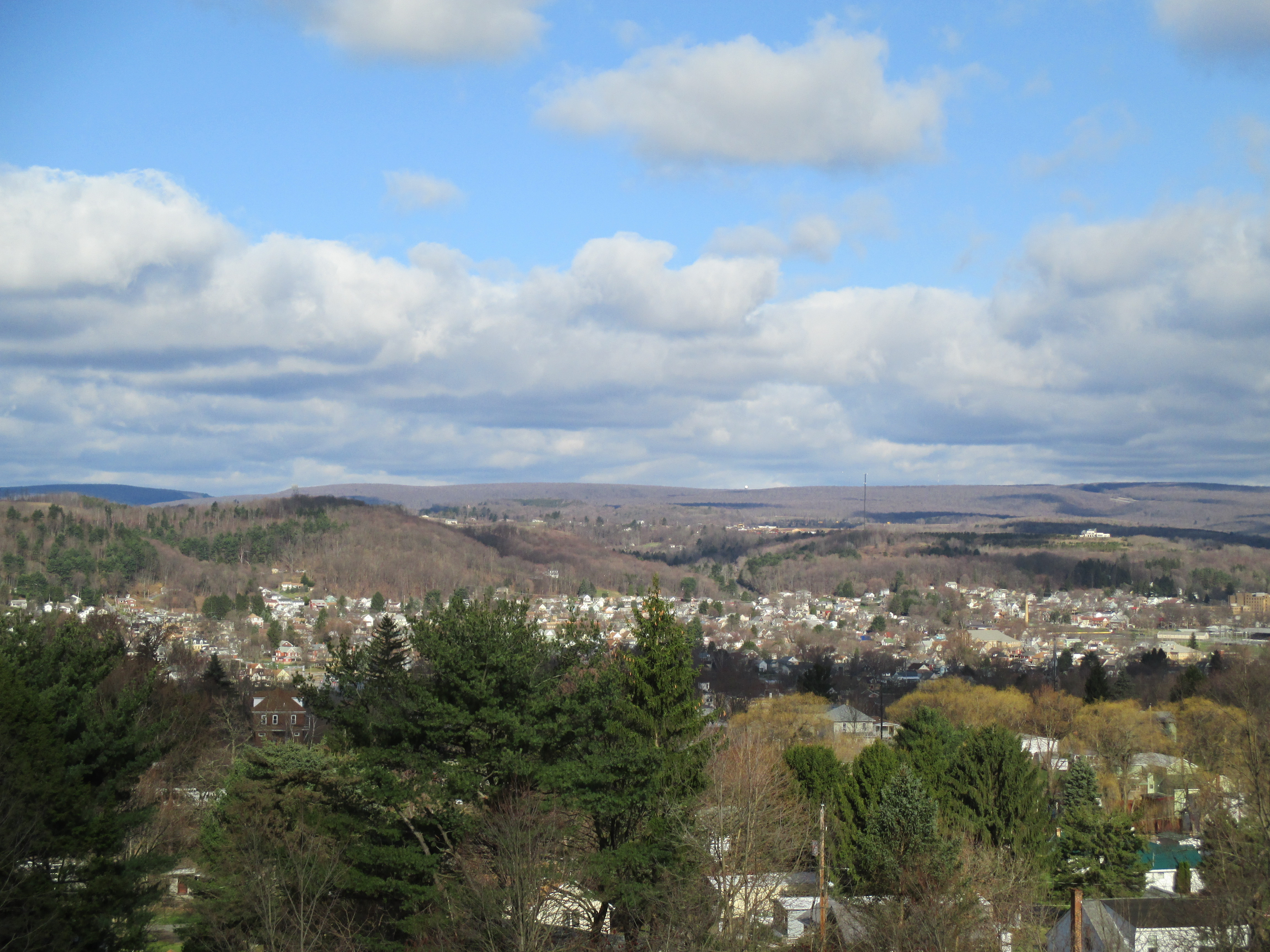
Clearfield, the county seat

Clearfield County was formed by the Act of Assembly by the second Governor of Pennsylvania at the time, Thomas McKean on March 26, 1804. The county was created from parts of the already created counties of Huntingdon and Lycoming. The name for the county was most likely derived from the many cleared fields of the valleys surrounding Clearfield Creek and West Branch of the Susquehanna River, formed by the bison herds and also by old corn fields of prior Native Americans tribes.

=== Location of county government ===
The first board of county commissioners to the county were Roland Curtin, James Fleming and James Smith, all appointed by Governor McKean in 1805. The first act the commissioners did was to create a local government or seat of the newly created county. They came upon land owned at the time by Abraham Witmer at a village known as Chincleclamousche, named after the Native American chief of the Cornplanter's tribe of Senecas. Clearfield became the new name of the old village.

=== Early industry ===
The two major industries of the county from the mid-1800s until the early 1900s were lumber and coal. Lumber was still being floated down the West Branch of the Susquehanna up until 1917. Coal mining significantly shaped the economy of Clearfield County, with companies like the Clearfield Bituminous Coal Corporation operating mines and establishing mining communities within the region. Coal remains the main industry of the county to this day. Founded in 1955, the Hepburnia Coal Company mines and ships coal in addition to several other lines of business.

=== Clearfield County Conspiracy Trials ===
No case tried in the county has caused as much comment as the union conspiracy trials. In all there were fifty-six persons, primarily miners in the Houtzdale region, who were charged with conspiracy as organized strikers.

The first case, against John Maloney and fifty-three others, was tried in 1875, before a jury with Judge Orvis presiding. All were found guilty, although they seem to have been solely peacefully picketing. Four were sentenced to one year's imprisonment and eight, to six months; the others' sentences were suspended. As every organized labor society in the United States was interested in the result, the events of the trial and verdict were telegraphed throughout the country

This proceeding was followed by the trial of the remaining two offenders, who were union representatives, John Siney and Xingo Parks. Siney was then the President of the Miners' National Association (MNA); he had come to Houtzdale and delivered an address of support for the union strike, for which he was arrested. Parks was an able organizer for the MNA. Federal Senator Matthew H. Carpenter of Wisconsin defended both men. At trial, Siney was acquitted; Parks was found guilty of inciting unlawful assembly and sentenced to one year's imprisonment, but pardoned within a month from the time sentence was pronounced.

These cases led in the next year to a liberalization of the Pennsylvania conspiracy law, through amendment providing that only "force, threat, or menace of harm to person or property" would be illegal.

== Geography ==
According to the U.S. Census Bureau, the county has a total area of 1,154 square miles (2,990 km^{2}), of which 1,145 square miles (2,970 km^{2}) is land and 9.2 square miles (24 km^{2}) (0.8%) is water. It is the third-largest county in Pennsylvania by land area and fourth-largest by total area. The West Branch Susquehanna River flows through the county, bisecting the county seat along the way. Clearfield County is one of the 423 counties served by the Appalachian Regional Commission, and it is identified as part of the "Midlands" by Colin Woodard in his book American Nations: A History of the Eleven Rival Regional Cultures of North America.

The mountainous terrain of the county made traffic difficult for early settlers. Various Native American paths and trails crossing the area were used intermittently by settlers, invading armies, and escaped slaves travelling north along the Underground Railroad. A major feature located in Bloom Township, within the county, is known as Bilger's rocks and exhibits fine examples of exposed sandstone bedrock that was created during the formation of the Appalachian Mountains.

=== Major highways ===
- I-80, exits 97, 101, 111, 120, 123 & 133
- US 119
- US 219
- US 322
- PA 36
- PA 53
- PA 153
- PA 253
- PA 255
- PA 286
- PA 410
- PA 453
- PA 729
- PA 830
- PA 865
- PA 879
- PA 969
- PA 970

=== Adjacent counties ===
- Elk County (north)
- Cameron County (north)
- Clinton County (northeast)
- Centre County (east)
- Blair County (southeast)
- Cambria County (south)
- Indiana County (southwest)
- Jefferson County (west)

=== Climate ===
The county has a warm-summer humid continental climate (Dfb). Average monthly temperatures in DuBois range from 24.6 °F in January to 68.6 °F in July, while in Clearfield borough they range from 23.8 °F in January to 69.3 °F in July and in Osceola Mills they range from 24.4 °F in January to 69.1 °F in July.

== Demographics ==
Historical population
| Census | Pop. | Note | %± |
|---|---|---|---|
| 1810 | 875 | | — |
| 1820 | 2,342 | | 167.7% |
| 1830 | 4,803 | | 105.1% |
| 1840 | 7,834 | | 63.1% |
| 1850 | 12,586 | | 60.7% |
| 1860 | 18,759 | | 49.0% |
| 1870 | 25,741 | | 37.2% |
| 1880 | 43,408 | | 68.6% |
| 1890 | 69,565 | | 60.3% |
| 1900 | 80,614 | | 15.9% |
| 1910 | 93,768 | | 16.3% |
| 1920 | 103,236 | | 10.1% |
| 1930 | 86,727 | | −16.0% |
| 1940 | 92,094 | | 6.2% |
| 1950 | 85,957 | | −6.7% |
| 1960 | 81,534 | | −5.1% |
| 1970 | 74,619 | | −8.5% |
| 1980 | 83,578 | | 12.0% |
| 1990 | 78,097 | | −6.6% |
| 2000 | 83,380 | | 6.8% |
| 2010 | 81,642 | | −2.1% |
| 2020 | 80,562 | | −1.3% |
| 2025 (est.) | 78,100 | ▼ | −3.1% |

=== 2020 census ===
As of the 2020 census, the county had a population of 80,562. The median age was 45.9 years. 18.1% of residents were under the age of 18 and 21.7% of residents were 65 years of age or older. For every 100 females there were 110.9 males, and for every 100 females age 18 and over there were 112.5 males age 18 and over.

38.7% of residents lived in urban areas, while 61.3% lived in rural areas.

There were 32,435 households in the county, of which 24.3% had children under the age of 18 living in them. Of all households, 49.0% were married-couple households, 19.5% were households with a male householder and no spouse or partner present, and 24.2% were households with a female householder and no spouse or partner present. About 30.1% of all households were made up of individuals and 14.6% had someone living alone who was 65 years of age or older.

There were 38,078 housing units, of which 14.8% were vacant. Among occupied housing units, 76.4% were owner-occupied and 23.6% were renter-occupied. The homeowner vacancy rate was 2.0% and the rental vacancy rate was 8.3%.

=== Racial and ethnic composition ===
Clearfield County, Pennsylvania – Racial and ethnic composition Note: the US Census treats Hispanic/Latino as an ethnic category. This table excludes Latinos from the racial categories and assigns them to a separate category. Hispanics/Latinos may be of any race.
| Race / Ethnicity (NH = Non-Hispanic) | Pop 2000 | Pop 2010 | Pop 2020 | % 2000 | % 2010 | % 2020 |
|---|---|---|---|---|---|---|
| White alone (NH) | 81,005 | 77,031 | 73,338 | 97.14% | 94.35% | 91.03% |
| Black or African American alone (NH) | 1,236 | 1,697 | 1,760 | 1.48% | 2.07% | 2.18% |
| Native American or Alaska Native alone (NH) | 88 | 51 | 78 | 0.10% | 0.06% | 0.09% |
| Asian alone (NH) | 220 | 384 | 450 | 0.26% | 0.47% | 0.55% |
| Pacific Islander alone (NH) | 9 | 15 | 0 | 0.01% | 0.01% | 0.00% |
| Other race alone (NH) | 19 | 23 | 146 | 0.02% | 0.02% | 0.18% |
| Mixed race or Multiracial (NH) | 334 | 534 | 2,153 | 0.40% | 0.65% | 2.67% |
| Hispanic or Latino (any race) | 471 | 1,907 | 2,637 | 0.56% | 2.33% | 3.27% |
| Total | 83,382 | 81,642 | 80,562 | 100.00% | 100.00% | 100.00% |

=== 2000 census ===
As of the 2000 census, there were 83,382 people, 32,785 households, and 22,916 families residing in the county. The population density was 73 people per square mile (28 people/km^{2}). There were 37,855 housing units at an average density of 33 units per square mile (13/km^{2}). The racial makeup of the county was 97.40% White, 1.49% Black or African American, 0.12% Native American, 0.26% Asian, 0.01% Pacific Islander, 0.26% from other races, and 0.46% from two or more races. 0.56% of the population were Hispanic or Latino of any race. 22.9% were of German, 13.6% American, 10.2% English, 9.9% Irish, 9.1% Italian and 6.0% Polish ancestry.

There were 32,785 households, out of which 29.70% had children under the age of 18 living with them, 56.60% were married couples living together, 9.30% had a female householder with no husband present, and 30.10% were non-families. 26.30% of all households were made up of individuals, and 13.10% had someone living alone who was 65 years of age or older. The average household size was 2.44 and the average family size was 2.94.

In the county, the population was spread out, with 22.70% under the age of 18, 7.70% from 18 to 24, 28.80% from 25 to 44, 23.90% from 45 to 64, and 16.90% who were 65 years of age or older. The median age was 39 years. For every 100 females there were 99.50 males. For every 100 females age 18 and over, there were 97.50 males.

== Micropolitan Statistical Area ==
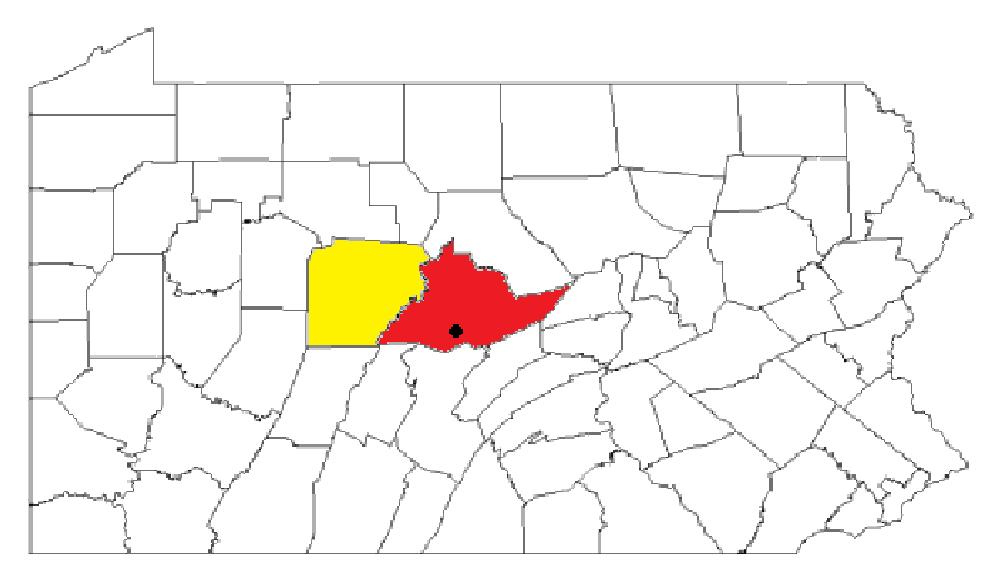
Map of the State College-DuBois, PA Combined Statistical Area (CSA), composed of the following parts: State College, PA Metropolitan Statistical Area DuBois, PA Micropolitan Statistical Area

The United States Office of Management and Budget has designated Clearfield County as the DuBois, PA Micropolitan Statistical Area (μSA). As of the 2010 census the micropolitan area ranked sixth most populous in the State of Pennsylvania and the 65th most populous in the United States, with a population of 81,642. Clearfield County is also a part of the State College–DuBois, PA Combined Statistical Area (CSA), which combines the populations of both Clearfield and Centre County areas, along with the State College area. The combined statistical area ranked the ninth most populous in Pennsylvania and 125th most populous in the U.S. with a population of 235,632.

== Politics and government ==
=== Voter registration ===
As of June 8, 2026, there were 49,551 registered voters in Clearfield County.

Chart of Voter Registration
1. Republican (63.4%)
2. Democratic (24.3%)
3. Independent (8.60%)
4. Other Parties (3.60%)
- Republican: 31,432 (63.4%)
- Democratic: 12,053 (24.3%)
- Independent: 4,281 (8.6%)
- Third Party: 1,785 (3.6%)

The county trends Republican in statewide and federal elections. The last Democrat to win a majority in the county was Lyndon B. Johnson in 1964, while Jimmy Carter and Bill Clinton winning pluralities in the county, with the former by 88 votes. In 2006, Democrat Bob Casey Jr. received 55% of its vote when he unseated incumbent Republican US Senator Rick Santorum and Ed Rendell received 50.2% of the vote against Lynn Swann. Each of the three row-office statewide winners carried Clearfield in 2008.

United States presidential election results for Clearfield County, Pennsylvania
| Year | Republican | | Democratic | | Third party(ies) | |
| Year | No. | % | No. | % | No. | % |
|---|---|---|---|---|---|---|
| 1888 | 5,297 | 44.51% | 6,266 | 52.66% | 337 | 2.83% |
| 1892 | 4,765 | 40.72% | 6,108 | 52.20% | 829 | 7.08% |
| 1896 | 7,395 | 50.97% | 6,460 | 44.53% | 653 | 4.50% |
| 1900 | 7,955 | 53.55% | 6,066 | 40.84% | 833 | 5.61% |
| 1904 | 9,541 | 64.12% | 4,291 | 28.84% | 1,047 | 7.04% |
| 1908 | 7,726 | 51.68% | 5,954 | 39.82% | 1,271 | 8.50% |
| 1912 | 1,523 | 11.81% | 4,670 | 36.20% | 6,707 | 51.99% |
| 1916 | 5,676 | 42.68% | 6,180 | 46.47% | 1,443 | 10.85% |
| 1920 | 9,615 | 52.28% | 5,987 | 32.55% | 2,791 | 15.17% |
| 1924 | 13,745 | 60.32% | 5,027 | 22.06% | 4,015 | 17.62% |
| 1928 | 16,719 | 67.26% | 7,870 | 31.66% | 270 | 1.09% |
| 1932 | 10,500 | 46.47% | 11,209 | 49.60% | 888 | 3.93% |
| 1936 | 14,531 | 40.31% | 20,799 | 57.69% | 720 | 2.00% |
| 1940 | 15,407 | 46.30% | 17,705 | 53.21% | 163 | 0.49% |
| 1944 | 13,986 | 50.24% | 13,617 | 48.92% | 233 | 0.84% |
| 1948 | 11,810 | 49.95% | 11,347 | 47.99% | 487 | 2.06% |
| 1952 | 16,045 | 54.25% | 13,376 | 45.22% | 156 | 0.53% |
| 1956 | 17,519 | 57.51% | 12,852 | 42.19% | 89 | 0.29% |
| 1960 | 18,911 | 56.97% | 14,212 | 42.81% | 72 | 0.22% |
| 1964 | 11,338 | 36.99% | 19,211 | 62.67% | 103 | 0.34% |
| 1968 | 14,471 | 49.62% | 12,369 | 42.41% | 2,323 | 7.97% |
| 1972 | 16,780 | 63.54% | 9,246 | 35.01% | 383 | 1.45% |
| 1976 | 13,626 | 49.22% | 13,714 | 49.54% | 345 | 1.25% |
| 1980 | 15,299 | 54.27% | 11,647 | 41.31% | 1,246 | 4.42% |
| 1984 | 18,653 | 60.62% | 11,963 | 38.88% | 153 | 0.50% |
| 1988 | 14,296 | 53.52% | 12,235 | 45.80% | 182 | 0.68% |
| 1992 | 11,553 | 37.45% | 12,247 | 39.70% | 7,047 | 22.85% |
| 1996 | 12,987 | 44.85% | 11,991 | 41.41% | 3,977 | 13.74% |
| 2000 | 18,019 | 58.82% | 11,718 | 38.25% | 896 | 2.92% |
| 2004 | 20,533 | 59.98% | 13,518 | 39.49% | 182 | 0.53% |
| 2008 | 18,662 | 54.85% | 14,555 | 42.78% | 805 | 2.37% |
| 2012 | 20,347 | 63.34% | 11,121 | 34.62% | 654 | 2.04% |
| 2016 | 24,932 | 72.16% | 8,200 | 23.73% | 1,418 | 4.10% |
| 2020 | 29,203 | 73.94% | 9,673 | 24.49% | 620 | 1.57% |
| 2024 | 30,481 | 75.23% | 9,647 | 23.81% | 387 | 0.96% |

United States Senate election results for Clearfield County, Pennsylvania1
| Year | Republican | | Democratic | | Third party(ies) | |
| Year | No. | % | No. | % | No. | % |
|---|---|---|---|---|---|---|
| 1994 | 12,908 | 53.50% | 9,929 | 41.15% | 1,291 | 5.35% |
| 2000 | 18,582 | 61.86% | 10,415 | 34.67% | 1,043 | 3.47% |
| 2006 | 11,480 | 44.73% | 14,186 | 55.27% | 0 | 0.00% |
| 2012 | 19,845 | 62.32% | 11,286 | 35.44% | 713 | 2.24% |
| 2018 | 16,852 | 58.47% | 9,540 | 33.10% | 2,429 | 8.43% |
| 2024 | 29,063 | 72.27% | 10,111 | 25.14% | 1,038 | 2.58% |

United States Senate election results for Clearfield County, Pennsylvania3
| Year | Republican | | Democratic | | Third party(ies) | |
| Year | No. | % | No. | % | No. | % |
|---|---|---|---|---|---|---|
| 1992 | 13,756 | 44.94% | 14,248 | 46.55% | 2,605 | 8.51% |
| 1998 | 12,162 | 59.91% | 7,415 | 36.53% | 724 | 3.57% |
| 2004 | 19,036 | 56.54% | 11,522 | 34.22% | 3,113 | 9.25% |
| 2010 | 14,798 | 60.45% | 9,682 | 39.55% | 0 | 0.00% |
| 2016 | 22,128 | 67.49% | 9,454 | 28.84% | 1,204 | 3.67% |
| 2022 | 21,948 | 69.90% | 8,533 | 27.18% | 918 | 2.92% |

Pennsylvania Gubernatorial election results for Clearfield County
| Year | Republican | | Democratic | | Third party(ies) | |
| Year | No. | % | No. | % | No. | % |
|---|---|---|---|---|---|---|
| 1970 | 10,666 | 43.10% | 13,502 | 54.56% | 581 | 2.35% |
| 1974 | 11,297 | 49.59% | 11,301 | 49.60% | 185 | 0.81% |
| 1978 | 10,989 | 46.33% | 12,619 | 53.20% | 111 | 0.47% |
| 1982 | 10,983 | 46.42% | 12,517 | 52.90% | 161 | 0.68% |
| 1986 | 10,030 | 42.68% | 13,316 | 56.66% | 155 | 0.66% |
| 1990 | 5,793 | 26.03% | 16,464 | 73.97% | 0 | 0.00% |
| 1994 | 11,713 | 48.32% | 8,432 | 34.78% | 4,097 | 16.90% |
| 1998 | 11,437 | 56.10% | 5,598 | 27.46% | 3,350 | 16.43% |
| 2002 | 13,822 | 56.32% | 10,221 | 41.64% | 501 | 2.04% |
| 2006 | 12,830 | 49.79% | 12,938 | 50.21% | 0 | 0.00% |
| 2010 | 15,685 | 63.52% | 9,007 | 36.48% | 0 | 0.00% |
| 2014 | 11,161 | 53.55% | 9,682 | 46.45% | 0 | 0.00% |
| 2018 | 17,241 | 65.68% | 8,594 | 32.74% | 416 | 1.58% |
| 2022 | 20,525 | 65.34% | 10,326 | 32.87% | 560 | 1.78% |

=== County commissioners ===
| Commissioners | Party | First elected |
|---|---|---|
| Dave Glass | Democratic | 2019 |
| Tim J. Winters | Republican | 2023 |
| John Sobel | Republican | 2007 |

=== Other county offices ===
| Office | Official | Party | First elected |
|---|---|---|---|
| Controller | Robert Edwards | Republican | 2021 |
| Coroner | Kim Shaffer Snyder | Republican | 2017 (appointed) |
| District Attorney | Ryan P. Sayers | Republican | 2019 |
| Prothonotary and Clerk of Courts | Brian K. Spencer | Republican | 2013 |
| Register of Wills and Recorder of Deeds | Heather Olson-Desmott | Republican | 2023 |
| Sheriff | Chester Hawkins | Republican | 2026 |
| Treasurer | Jay Siegel | Republican | 2023 |

=== State House of Representatives ===
| District | Representative | Party |
|---|---|---|
| 73 | Dallas Kephart | Republican |
| 75 | Mike Armanini | Republican |

State Senate

District 35 Wayne Langerholc Republican

=== United States House of Representatives ===
| District | Representative | Party |
|---|---|---|
| 15 | Glenn "G.T." Thompson | Republican |

=== United States Senate ===
| Senator | Party |
|---|---|
| John Fetterman | Democrat |
| Dave McCormick | Republican |

== Correctional facilities ==
- Clearfield County Jail
- Moshannon Valley Correctional Center
- Quehanna Bootcamp
- SCI Houtzdale

== Education ==
=== Colleges and universities ===
- Pennsylvania State University at DuBois

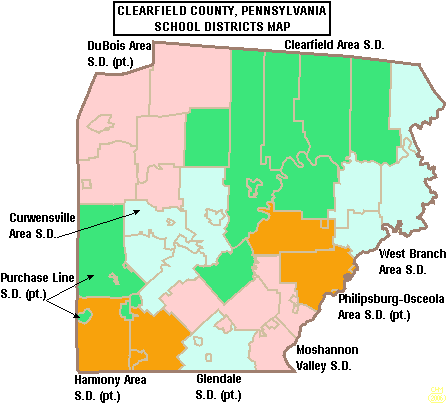
Map of Clearfield County, Pennsylvania Public School Districts

=== Community, junior and technical colleges ===
- Clearfield County Career and Technology Center
- Triangle Tech

=== Public school districts ===
- Clearfield Area School District
- Curwensville Area School District
- DuBois Area School District (also in Jefferson County)
- Glendale School District (also in Cambria County)
- Harmony Area School District (also in Indiana County)
- Moshannon Valley School District
- Philipsburg-Osceola Area School District (also in Centre County)
- Purchase Line School District (also in Indiana County)
- West Branch Area School District (also in Clinton County)

=== Intermediate unit ===
- Central IU 10 – West Decatur

=== Correctional institution schools ===
- Quehanna Boot Camp – Karthaus
- SCI-Houtzdale – Houtzdale
- Clearfield County Jail-Clearfield

=== Private schools ===
- Butchers Run Amish School
- Clearfield Alliance Christian School
- DuBois Area Catholic Elementary School
- DuBois Area Catholic High School
- DuBois Christian Schools
- Golden Yoke School
- Milestones Achievement Center
- Mount Calvary Christian Academy
- New Story (DuBois)
- Otterbein Christian Academy
- Paint & Play School (DuBois)
- Scenic View School
- St Francis Grade School
- Weber Road School

=== Libraries ===
- Clearfield County Public Library – Curwensville
- Curwensville Public Library
- DuBois Public Library –
- Glendale Public Library – Coalport
- Joseph and Elizabeth Shaw Public Library – Clearfield
- Hiller Family Memorial Library - Houtzdale

== Recreation ==
There are two Pennsylvania state parks in Clearfield County.

- Parker Dam State Park
- S. B. Elliott State Park

Clearfield County is also home to the largest wild area in Pennsylvania, the Quehanna Wild Area. A culturally and historically significant natural formation of massive sandstone megaliths can be found at Bilger's rocks.

=== Camping ===
Lodging/Camping

| Campground # | Name | Location | Campsites | Swimming | Fishing | Hunting |
|---|---|---|---|---|---|---|
| 2515 | Woodland Campground | Woodland | 70 | yes | yes | yes |

=== Hunting/fishing ===
Hunting

| SGL# | Location | Hunting Area | Acreage | Species |
|---|---|---|---|---|
| 34 | Medix Run | Benezette, Covington, Girard, Goshen Townships | 8,000 | bear, deer, turkey |
| 77 | Clear Run | Sandy Township | 3,038 | bear, deer, rabbit, squirrel |
| 78 | Bigler | Bradford & Graham Townships | 721 | bear, deer, turkey |
| 87 | Irishtown | Bell & Penn Townships | 10,422 | deer, grouse, turkey |
| 90 | Goshen | Goshen & Lawrence Townships | 3,958 | bear, deer, turkey |
| 93 | Sabula | Union & Huston Townships | 4,876 | bear, deer, turkey |
| 94 | Lecontes Mills | Goshen & Lawrence Townships | 2,108 | bear, deer, turkey |
| 98 | Blue Ball (West Decatur) | Boggs & Decatur Townships | 1,172 | deer, rabbit, turkey |

Fishing

| Lake/stream | Location | Tributary of |
|---|---|---|
| Bear Run Reservoir | Pike Township | West Branch of the Susquehanna River |
| Chest Creek | Chest Township | West Branch of the Susquehanna River |
| Clearfield Reservoir | Pike Township | West Branch of the Susquehanna River |
| Curwensville Lake | Pike Township | West Branch of the Susquehanna River |
| DuBois Reservoir | Union Township near Home Camp | |
| Duck Marshes | northern Girard Township near Elk County line | |
| Irvona Reservoir | Chest Township | Clearfield Creek |
| Lake Sabula | Sandy Township near Sabula | |
| Laurel Run (Bennett Branch Sinnemahoning Creek) | Huston Township in Parker Dam State Park | Bennett Branch of Sinnemahoning Creek |
| Moose Creek Reservoir | Lawrence Township near Mt. Joy | West Branch of the Susquehanna River |
| Parker Lake | Huston Township in Parker Dam State Park | Bennett Branch of Sinnemahoning Creek |
| Penfield Reservoir | Huston Township near Hoovertown | Bennett Branch of Sinnemahoning Creek |
| Treasure Lake | Sandy Township Treasure Lake | |
| Tyler Reservoir | Huston Township near Tyler | Bennett Branch of Sinnemahoning Creek |
| West Branch of the Susquehanna River | Most of central & eastern Clearfield County including Mahaffey, Curwensville, and Clearfield | Susquehanna River |

=== Sporting ===
Golf

| Course # | Name | Location | Holes | Website |
|---|---|---|---|---|
| 3133 | Chetremon Golf Course | 2 miles north of Cherry Tree in Burnside Township Clearfield County | 10 | https://web.archive.org/web/20111117163225/http://www.chetremon.com/ |
| 3274 | Grandview Golf Club | 1 mile south of Lumber City | 18 | http://www.golfnow.com/course-directory/pennsylvania-golf-courses/curwensville-golf-courses/grandview-golf-club |

=== Points of interest ===
- Bilger's Rocks
- Clearfield Armory
- Dimeling Hotel
- McGees Mills Covered Bridge
- St. Severin's Old Log Church

== Communities ==
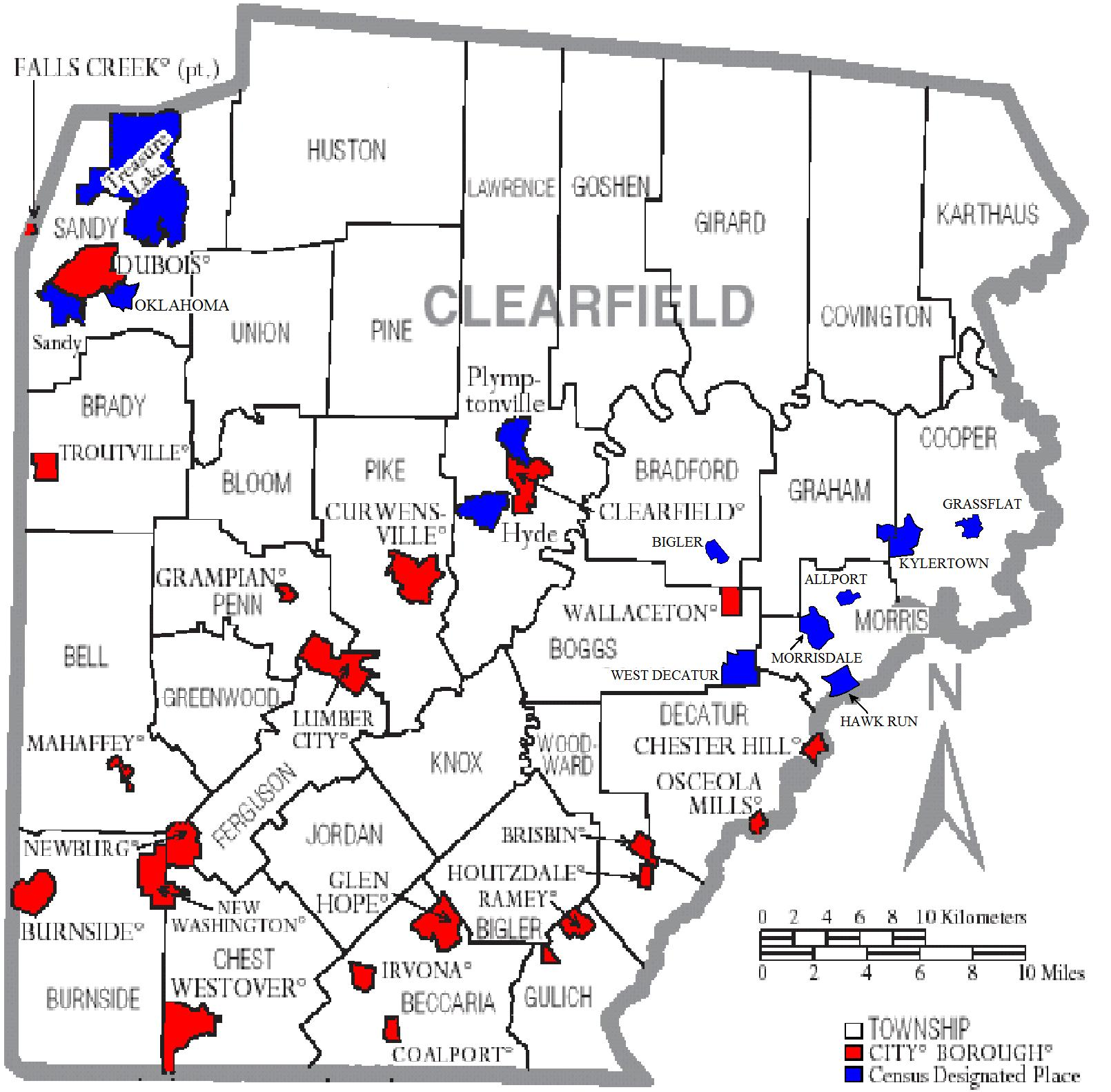
Map of Clearfield County, Pennsylvania with Municipal Labels, showing Cities and Boroughs (red), Townships (white), and Census-designated places (blue).

Under Pennsylvania law, there are four types of incorporated municipalities: cities, boroughs, townships, and, in at most two cases, towns. The following cities, boroughs and townships are located in Clearfield County:

=== City ===
- DuBois

=== Boroughs ===
- Brisbin
- Burnside
- Chester Hill
- Clearfield (county seat)
- Coalport
- Curwensville
- Falls Creek (mostly in Jefferson County)
- Glen Hope
- Grampian
- Houtzdale
- Irvona
- Mahaffey
- New Washington
- Newburg (also known as La Jose)
- Osceola Mills
- Ramey
- Troutville
- Wallaceton
- Westover

=== Townships ===
- Beccaria
- Bell
- Bigler
- Bloom
- Boggs
- Bradford
- Brady
- Burnside
- Chest
- Cooper
- Covington
- Decatur
- Ferguson
- Girard
- Goshen
- Graham
- Greenwood
- Gulich
- Huston
- Jordan
- Karthaus
- Knox
- Lawrence
- Morris
- Penn
- Pike
- Pine
- Sandy
- Union
- Woodward

=== Census-designated places ===
Census-designated places are geographical areas designated by the U.S. Census Bureau for the purposes of compiling demographic data. They are not actual jurisdictions under Pennsylvania law. Other unincorporated communities, such as villages, may be listed here as well.

- Allport
- Bigler
- Grassflat
- Hawk Run
- Hyde
- Kylertown
- Morrisdale
- Oklahoma
- Plymptonville
- Sandy
- Treasure Lake
- West Decatur

=== Unincorporated communities ===
Unincorporated areas are region of land that are not parts of any incorporated boroughs, cities, or towns.

- Helvetia
- Lumber City
- New Castle (Clearfield County) – in Decatur Township
- Sylvan Grove
- Viola

=== Population ranking ===
The population ranking of the following table is based on the 2010 census of Clearfield County.

† county seat

| Rank | City/Town/etc. | Population (2010 Census) | Municipal type |
|---|---|---|---|
| 1 | DuBois | 7,794 | City |
| 2 | † Clearfield | 6,215 | Borough |
| 3 | Treasure Lake | 3,861 | CDP |
| 4 | Curwensville | 2,542 | Borough |
| 5 | Sandy | 1,429 | CDP |
| 6 | Hyde | 1,399 | CDP |
| 7 | Osceola Mills | 1,141 | Borough |
| 8 | Falls Creek (mostly in Jefferson County) | 1,037 | Borough |
| 9 | Plymptonville | 981 | CDP |
| 10 | Chester Hill | 883 | Borough |
| 11 | Houtzdale | 797 | Borough |
| 12 | Oklahoma | 782 | CDP |
| 13 | Morrisdale | 754 | CDP |
| 14 | Irvona | 647 | Borough |
| 15 | Hawk Run | 534 | CDP |
| 16 | West Decatur | 533 | CDP |
| 17 | Coalport | 523 | Borough |
| 18 | Grassflat | 511 | CDP |
| 19 | Ramey | 451 | Borough |
| 20 | Brisbin | 411 | Borough |
| 21 | Bigler | 398 | CDP |
| 22 | Westover | 390 | Borough |
| 23 | Mahaffey | 368 | Borough |
| 24 | Grampian | 356 | Borough |
| 25 | Kylertown | 340 | CDP |
| 26 | Wallaceton | 313 | Borough |
| 27 | Allport | 264 | CDP |
| 28 | Troutville | 243 | Borough |
| 29 | Burnside | 234 | Borough |
| 30 | Glen Hope | 142 | Borough |
| 31 | Newburg | 92 | Borough |
| 32 | New Washington | 59 | Borough |

== Notable people ==
- Mary Elizabeth Willson (1842–1906), gospel singer, singer, composer, evangelist
- Willie Adams, major league baseball pitcher (1912–1919)
- Howie Bedell, major league baseball player
- William Bigler (January 1, 1814 – August 9, 1880), American politician, 12th Governor of Pennsylvania from 1852 to 1855, later U.S. Senator for Pennsylvania from 1856 until 1861.
- Earl Caldwell, former reporter and columnist for The New York Times; first African-American to have a regular column in a major national newspaper. Central figure in a major Supreme Court case about the protection of journalists' sources. Currently hosts Pacifica's WBAI radio (New York City)
- Otto Eppers, cartoonist/illustrator who as part of a stunt successfully jumped off the Brooklyn Bridge at 17 years old
- Howard Fargo, former member of the Pennsylvania House of Representatives (1981–2000)
- Anthony A. Mitchell, clarinetist, composer and conductor. Led the United States Navy Band from 1962 to 1968.
- Rembrandt Cecil Robinson (1924–1972) was a United States Navy officer (Rear admiral)[17]
- Edward Scofield, governor of Wisconsin (1897–1901)
- William Irvin Swoope, Republican member of the U.S. House of Representatives (1923–27)
- William A. Wallace, Democratic U.S. senator who served from 1875 to 1881
- Powell Weaver, composer and organist
- Zenas Leonard (1809 - 1857), American mountain man, explorer and trader, known for his journal "Narrative of the Adventures of Zenas Leonard"

== See also ==
- Interstate 80 in Pennsylvania#Highest Point on 80
- Indian old field
- National Register of Historic Places listings in Clearfield County, Pennsylvania
