= Covington Township, Clearfield County, Pennsylvania =

Township in Pennsylvania, US

Coordinates: 41°07′00″N 78°10′59″W

- Township
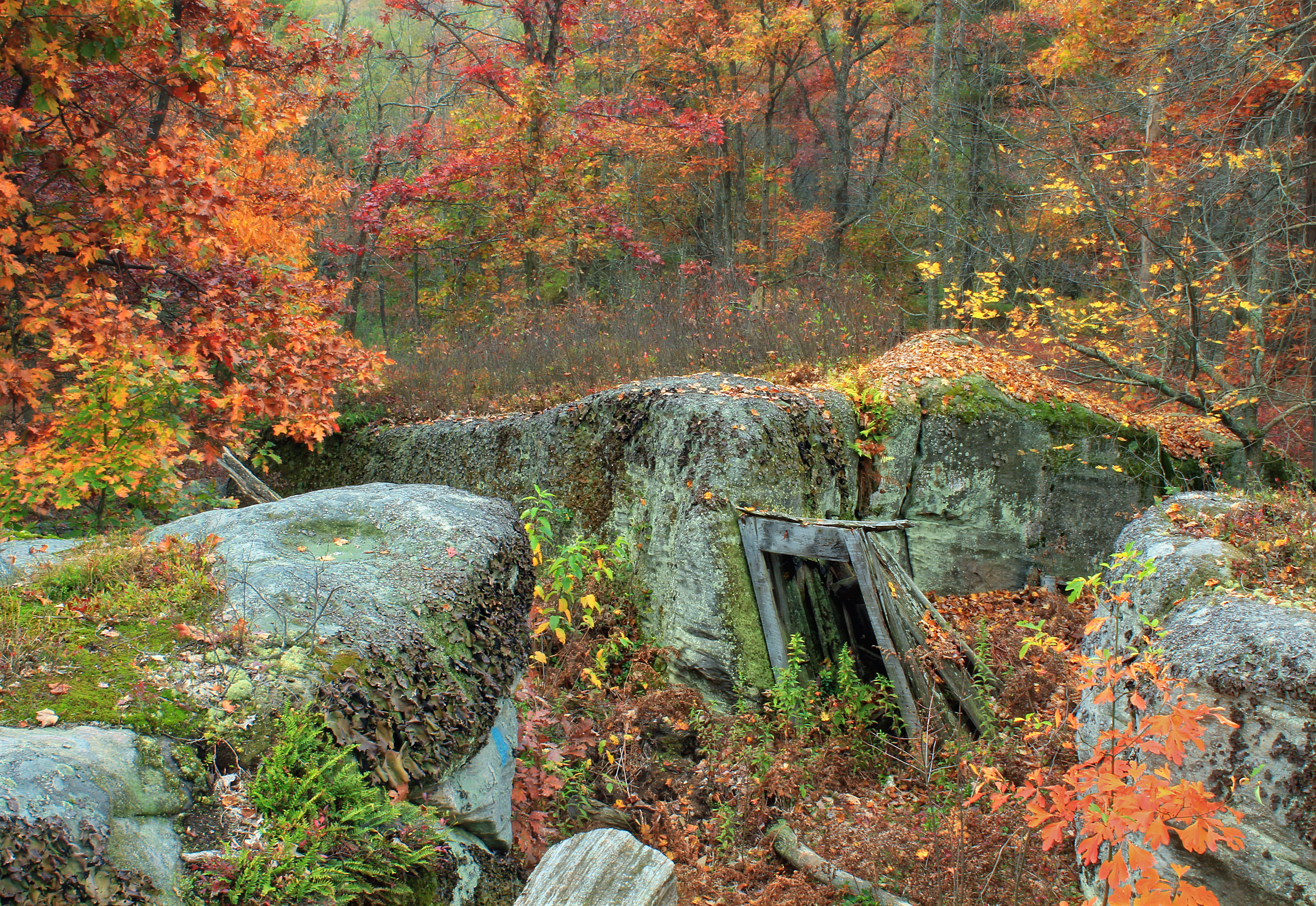
- Ruins and rock formations along the Kunes Camp Trail in Covington Township

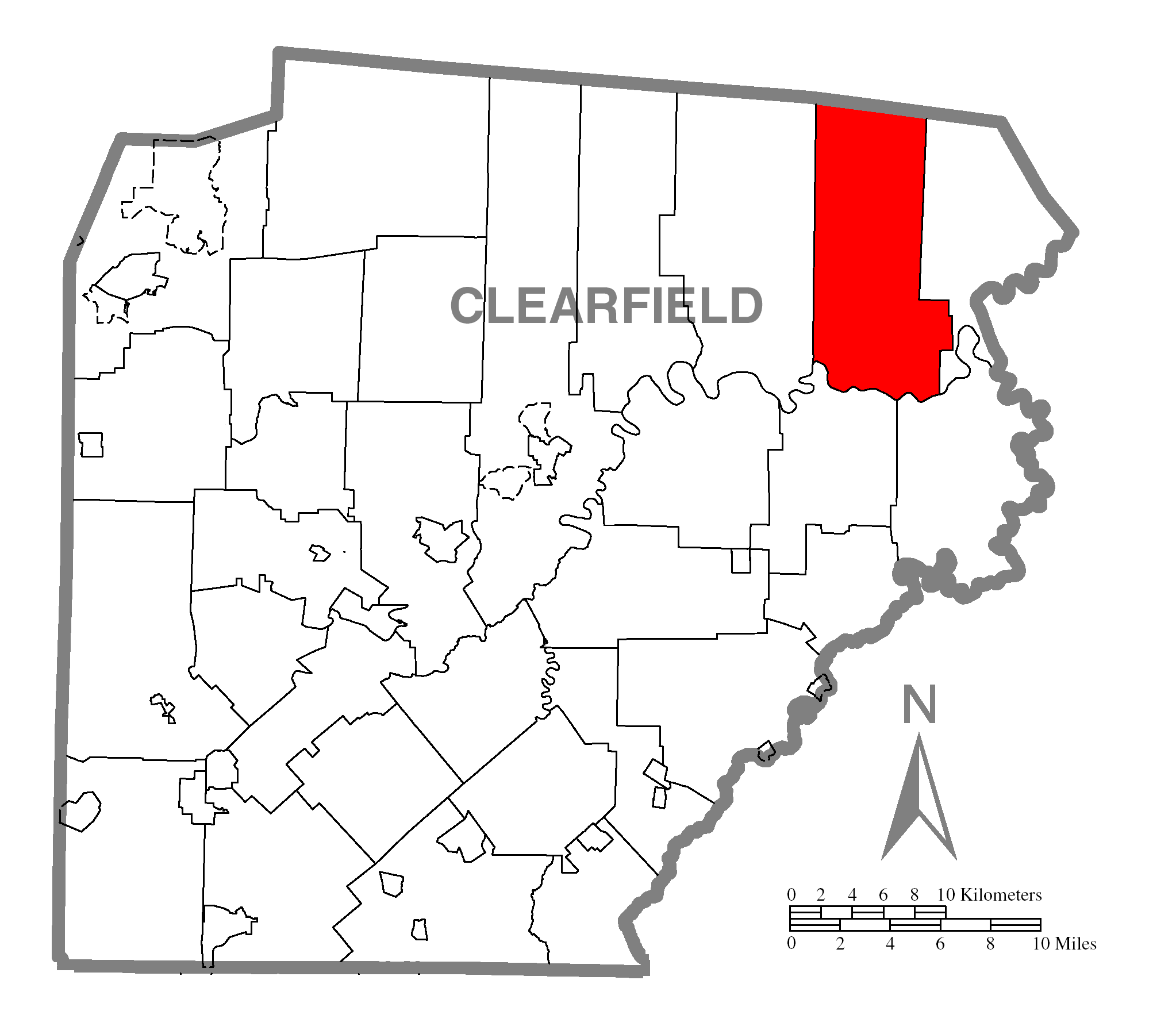
- Map of Clearfield County, Pennsylvania highlighting Covington Township

- Map of Clearfield County, Pennsylvania
- Country: United States
- State: Pennsylvania
- County: Clearfield
- Settled: 1817
- Incorporated: 1817

Area
  - Total: 53.14 sq mi (137.63 km^{2})
  - Land: 52.92 sq mi (137.05 km^{2})
  - Water: 0.22 sq mi (0.58 km^{2})

Population (2020)
  - Total: 497 ▼
  - Estimate (2022): 492 ▼
  - Density: 9.6/sq mi (3.71/km^{2})
- Time zone: UTC-5 (Eastern (EST))
  - Summer (DST): UTC-4 (EDT)
- Area code: 814
- FIPS code: 42-033-16656

Covington Township is a township in Clearfield County, Pennsylvania, United States. Its population was 497 at the 2020 census.

== Geography ==
According to the United States Census Bureau, the township has a total area of 52.5 square miles (136 km^{2}), of which 52.4 square miles (136 km^{2}) is land and 0.2 square miles (0.52 km^{2}) (0.29%) is water.

== Communities ==
- Frenchville
- Guenot Settlement
- Keewaydin
- Rolling Stone

== Demographics ==
Historical population
| Census | Pop. | Note | %± |
|---|---|---|---|
| 1970 | 533 | | — |
| 1980 | 669 | | 25.5% |
| 1990 | 648 | | −3.1% |
| 2000 | 621 | | −4.2% |
| 2010 | 526 | | −15.3% |
| 2020 | 497 | | −5.5% |
| 2022 (est.) | 492 | | −1.0% |
U.S. Decennial Census

As of the census of 2010, there were 526 people, 232 households, and 167 families residing in the township. The population density was 11.9 people per square mile (4.6/km^{2}). There were 431 housing units at an average density of 8.2/sq mi (3.2/km^{2}). The racial makeup of the township was 99.36% White, 0.32% from other races, and 0.32% from two or more races. Hispanic or Latino of any race were 0.32% of the population.

There were 232 households, out of which 29.3% had children under the age of 18 living with them, 61.2% were married couples living together, 6.9% had a female householder with no husband present, and 28.0% were non-families. 22.4% of all households were made up of individuals, and 12.1% had someone living alone who was 65 years of age or older. The average household size was 2.66 and the average family size was 3.10.

In the township the population was spread out, with 22.7% under the age of 18, 8.4% from 18 to 24, 28.7% from 25 to 44, 25.8% from 45 to 64, and 14.5% who were 65 years of age or older. The median age was 41 years. For every 100 females there were 98.4 males. For every 100 females age 18 and over, there were 92.8 males.

The median income for a household in the township was $38,438, and the median income for a family was $42,917. Males had a median income of $28,000 versus $21,161 for females. The per capita income for the township was $16,964. About 7.6% of families and 12.6% of the population were below the poverty line, including 20.9% of those under age 18 and 11.5% of those age 65 or over.

== Linguistics ==
The village of Frenchville within the township was begun in 1835 by French settlers from Normandy and Picardy. The village has a small population, and the local dialect evolved in isolation until being rediscovered by linguists in the 1960s. The Frenchville and neighboring Girard Township francophones spoke a distinct dialect of North American French that presently is moribund.

== Education ==
Students living in Covington Township attend schools in the Clearfield Area School District.
