= Parker Dam State Park =

State park in Pennsylvania, United States

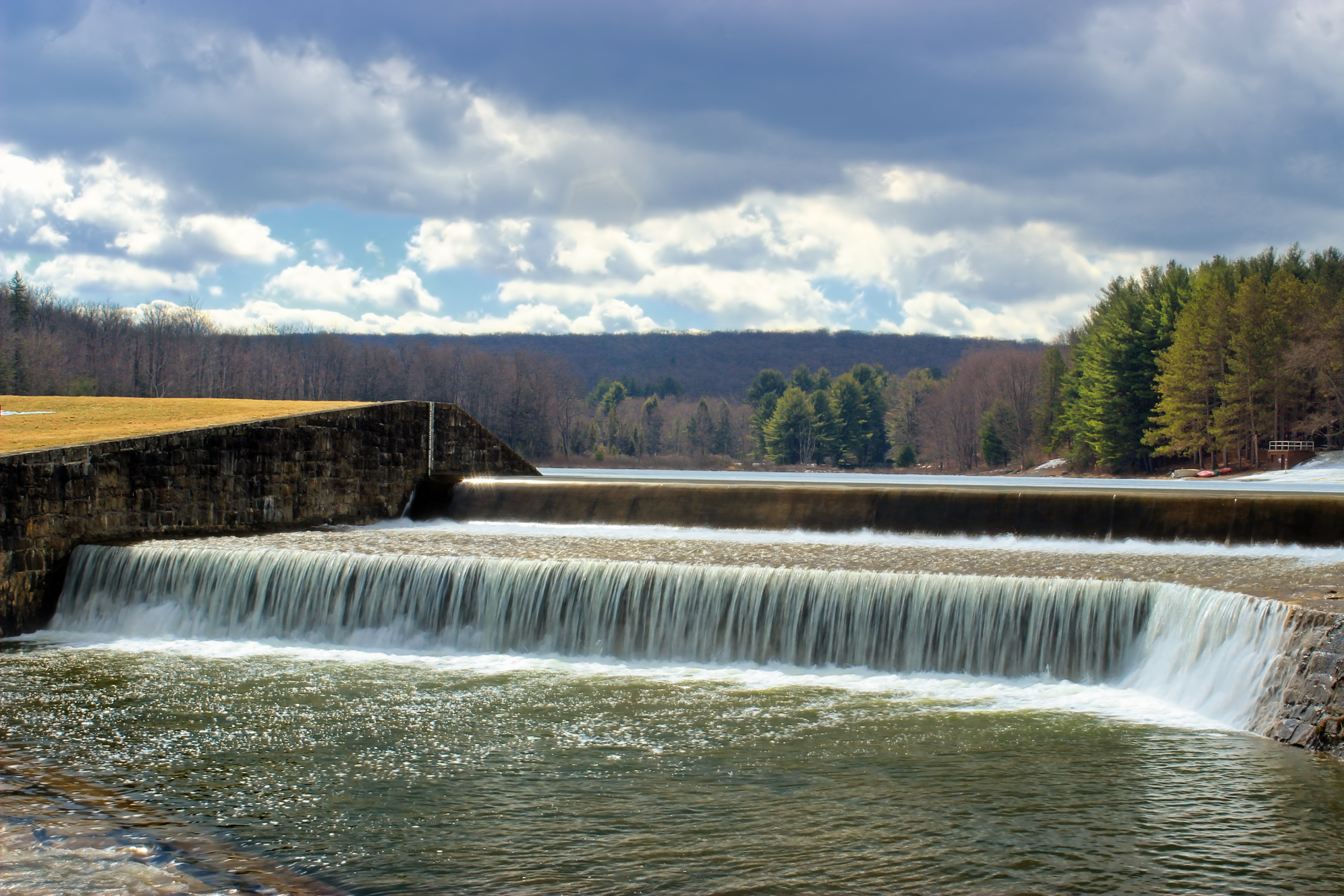

- Location within Pennsylvania Location within the United States
- Interactive map of Parker Dam State Park
- Location: Huston Township, Clearfield County, Pennsylvania, United States
- Coordinates: 41°11′37″N 78°30′41″W
- Area: 968 acres (392 ha)
- Elevation: 1,627 feet (496 m)
- Established: 1936
- Administrator: Pennsylvania Department of Conservation and Natural Resources
- Website: Official website
- Pennsylvania State Parks

Parker Dam State Park is a 968-acre (392 ha) Pennsylvania state park in Huston Township, Clearfield County, Pennsylvania in the United States. The park is surrounded by Moshannon State Forest. Parker Dam State park is 17 miles (27 km) north of Clearfield on Pennsylvania Route 153 just off exit 111 of Interstate 80. The park was constructed during the Great Depression by the Civilian Conservation Corps; they built many of the facilities that are in use today at Parker Dam State Park.

== History ==
The park takes its name from William Parker, who leased lumbering rights from John Otto. Parker built a splash dam on Laurel Run at the site of the present lake. Lumbering began as early as 1794 in Clearfield County, harvesting the white pine and hemlock which covered the mountainsides. The tall white pines fetched a high price in Baltimore for use as masts. Logs were to Baltimore by way of the Susquehanna River. Logging picked up in force during the 1850s when the Susquehanna Boom was built across the West Branch Susquehanna River at Williamsport. The boom stopped the floating logs for sorting and cutting at the sawmills. Later, railroads and roads were built by the lumber companies to harvest and distribute the timber. The railroads replaced the floating of the logs down the creeks and into the West Branch. The lumber boom era was not to last, and soon all the trees were gone. Once the trees disappeared, the people were soon to follow. The lumbermen left behind a barren landscape that was devastated by erosion, flooding and wildfires for twenty years. The Commonwealth of Pennsylvania bought the thousands of acres of deforested and burned land. The state began the massive project of reforesting the land. The young men of the Civilian Conservation Corps led the reforestation effort. They also built miles of road, many bridges, cleared streams and built the facilities at Parker Dam State Park.

== Ecology ==
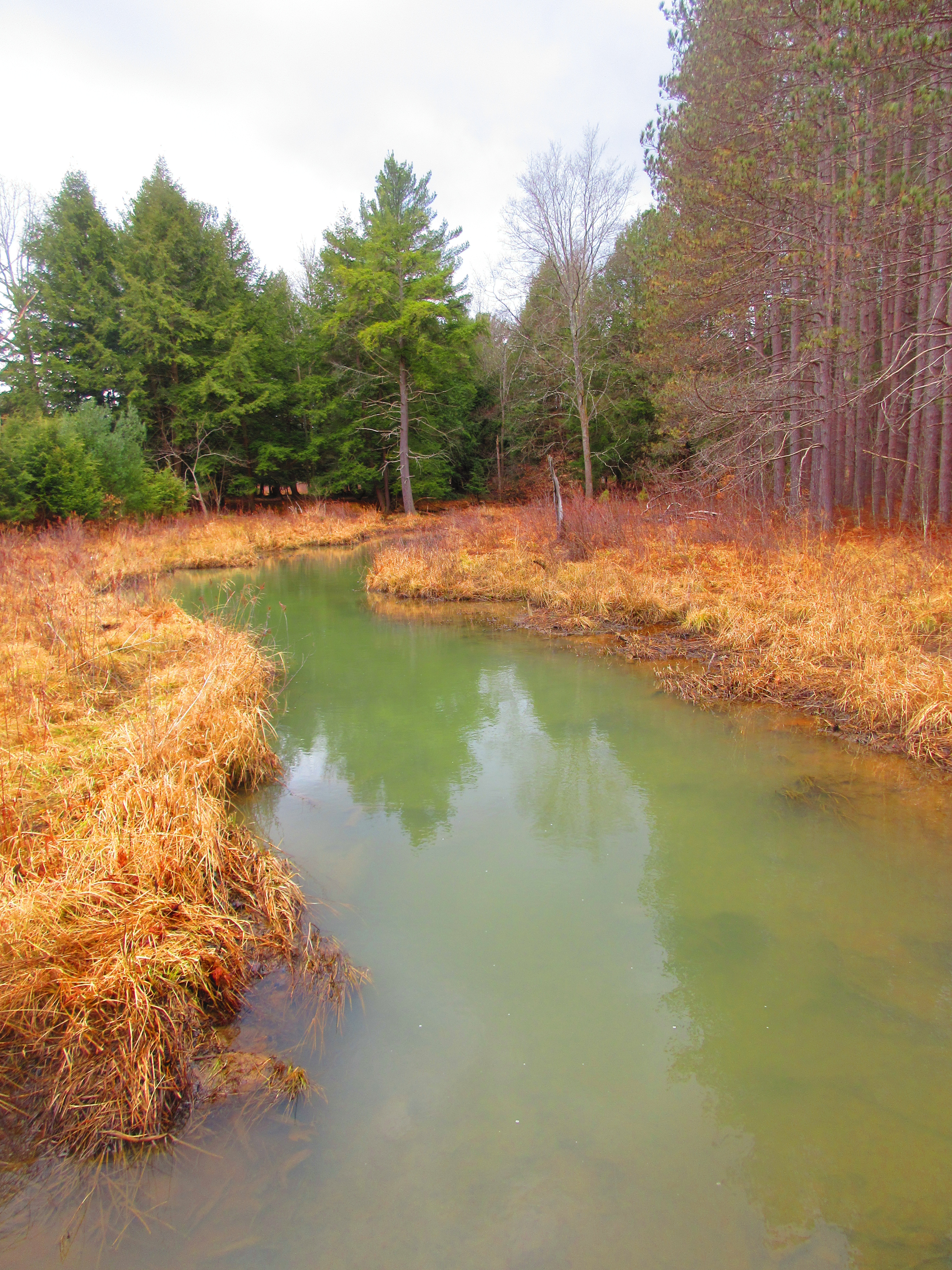
Tannin-dyed wetlands from the Beaver Dam Trail

Parker Dam State Park and the surrounding Moshannon State Forest provides a habitat for a wide variety of wild creatures. There are many warblers and ravens to be seen in the dark coniferous forests. The rarely seen ovenbird and American redstart make their home in the deciduous forest. Turkey, beaver, white-tailed deer, coyotes and foxes can be spotted along the ridges, in the hollows and in the fields of the park. Bobcat, porcupine and elk also make their home in the woods of Parker Dam State Park. Elk are rarely seen in Pennsylvania, but there is a large herd that has thrived in the most remote and wooded parts of Clearfield, Cameron, Elk and Clinton counties.

== 1985 Tornado ==
Animation of GOES 6 satellite taken May 31st, 1985. The Parker Dam tornado occurred out ahead of the main line that day. The storm can be seen forming around the northern tip of the Northern Panhandle of West Virginia and moving eastward across Pennsylvania.

A tornado struck Clearfield County during the 1985 United States-Canada tornado outbreak that occurred on May 31 of that year and destroyed a great portion of the forest in Parker Dam State Park. The tornado was rated F4 on the Fujita scale with winds in the park of up to 260 M.P.H at the time, however with the newer Enhanced Fujita scale this tornado ranks as an EF5 today. At the time of the tornado, not many people were in the park, although a couple of campers and boy scouts were on hand to tell the story of survival. This tornado escaped the news, due to no loss of life and its location. It was the longest-lived tornado of the outbreak that day in the state, staying on the ground for 69 miles, and stretching across Clearfield, Clinton, and Centre counties, and was one of four F4 tornadoes to touch down in Pennsylvania that day. The state used this as an opportunity to teach about how forests will regrow if left untouched after a tornado. Mud Run Road dissects the tornado damaged area. The land to the west of the road was left untouched and many large and bare tree trunks are left standing. The fallen trees to the east of the road were salvaged for lumber. The forest is regrowing at different rates on either side of the road, providing a study of the effects of man on reforestation.

== Recreation ==
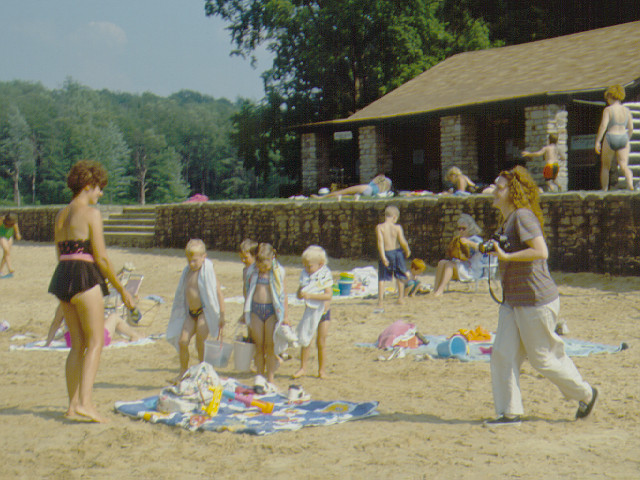
Beach on Parker Lake in the park

Parker Lake is a 20-acre (8.1 ha) man made lake in Parker Dam State Park created by the damming of Laurel Run. The camping and picnic areas are located on the shores of the lake. There is a sand beach at Parker Lake that is open from 8:00 am until dusk from Memorial Day until the end of September. Beginning in 2008 lifeguards will not be posted at the beach.

Boating on Parker Lake is limited to non powered and electric powered boats. All boats must be properly registered with any state and have a launching or mooring permit from the Pennsylvania Fish and Boat Commission. The lake is a fishing destination for those in search of largemouth bass, sunfish, and brown bullhead. When the lake freezes in winter it is open to ice fishing and ice skating.

Hunting is permitted on about 526 acres (213 ha) of Parker Dam State Park. Hunters are expected to follow the rules and regulations of the Pennsylvania Game Commission. The common game species are ruffed grouse, squirrels, turkey, white-tailed deer, and rabbits. The hunting of groundhogs is prohibited.

Parker Dam State Park is the western trailhead of the Quehanna Trail. This trail is about 75 miles (121 km) long and meanders its way through the surrounding state forests. The Quehanna Trail connects with the Susquehannock Trail near Sinnemahoning State Park. Backpackers are not permitted to camp overnight at the park. The trails are open to cross-country skiing during the winter months.

== Educational Opportunities ==
Parker Dam State Park holds education workshops in several different fields of study. Environmental education opportunities are available year-round through hands-on activities, guided walks and evening programs and lectures. The park also holds educational programs for schools and teachers. Visitors can get a hands on opportunity to explore a maple sugaring operation in March and an apple cider demonstration during October. The park also has a display about the life and times of the members of the Civilian Conservation Corps that did so much to help build Parker Dam State Park.
