= Clearfield Area School District =

School district in Pennsylvania

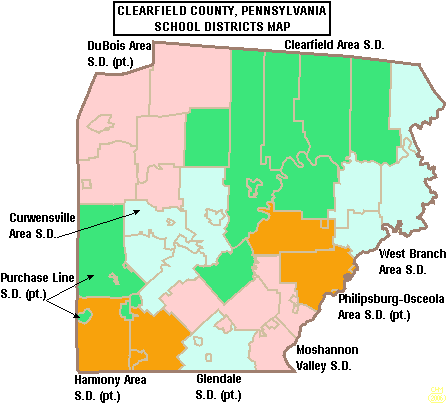
- Map of Clearfield County, Pennsylvania public school districts

Address
- 438 River Street, P.O. Box 710 Clearfield, Clearfield County, Pennsylvania, 16830; United States

District information
- Type: Public

Students and staff
- District mascot: Bison
- Colors: Red and black

Other information
- Website: clearfield.org

The Clearfield Area School District is a midsized, rural, public school district. The district is one of the 500 public school districts of Pennsylvania. It is located within the central and northern portion of Clearfield County, Pennsylvania. Clearfield Area School District encompasses approximately 345 square miles (890 km^{2}). The Clearfield Area School District serves the Borough of Clearfield and Bradford Township, Covington Township, Girard Township, Goshen Township, Knox Township, Lawrence Township and Pine Township. According to 2000 federal census data, Clearfield Area School District served a resident population of 20,215 people. By 2010, the district's population declined to 19,115 people. In 2009, the district residents' per capita income was $16,245 a year, while the median family income was $37,134. In the Commonwealth, the median family income was $49,501 and the United States median family income was $49,445, in 2010. The educational attainment levels for the school district population (25 years old and over) were 85.5% high school graduates and 11.9% college graduates.

The colors of the school district are red and black, and the mascot is the bison. The mascot is modeled after the look of an American bison.

== Schools ==
Clearfield Area School District operates one combined middle/high school (7th-12th) and one elementary school (K-6th).

- Clearfield Elementary School
- Clearfield Area Junior/Senior High School
- CASD Cyber Services K-12 or with Lincoln Interactive

High school students may choose to attend Clearfield County Career and Technology Center for training in the construction and mechanical trades. The Central Intermediate Unit IU10 provides the district with a wide variety of services like specialized education for disabled students and hearing, speech and visual disability services and professional development for staff and faculty.

Closed schools in 2014: Bradford Township Elementary School, Centre, Clearfield Area Middle School, Girard-Goshen Elementary School (2012)

== Extracurriculars ==
Clearfield Area School District offers a variety of clubs, activities and an extensive sports program.

=== Sports ===
The district funds:

Boys

- Baseball - AAA
- Basketball- AAA
- Cross Country - AA
- Football - AAA
- Golf - AAA
- Soccer - AA
- Swimming and Diving - AA
- Tennis - AAA
- Track and Field - AAA
- Wrestling - AA

Girls

- Basketball - AAA
- Cross Country - AA
- Golf - AAA
- Soccer (Fall) - AA
- Softball - AAA
- Swimming and Diving - AA
- Girls' Tennis - AAA
- Track and Field - AA
- Volleyball - AA

Middle School Sports

Boys

- Basketball
- Football
- Soccer
- Track and Field
- Wrestling

Girls

- Basketball
- Soccer (Fall)
- Softball
- Track and Field

According to PIAA directory July 2012
