= Treasure Lake, Pennsylvania =

Unincorporated community in Pennsylvania, US

- Census-designated place
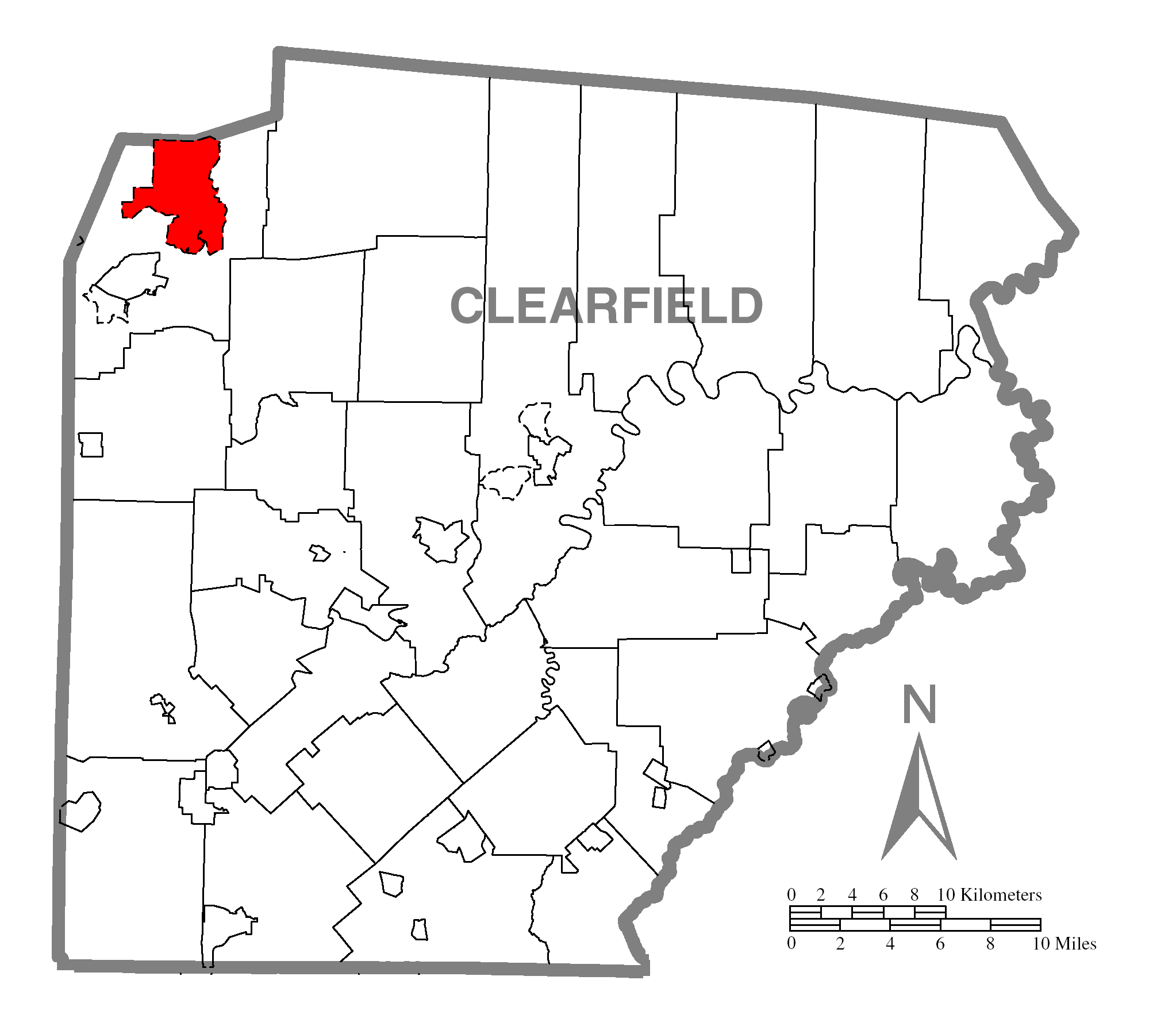
- Location of Treasure Lake in Clearfield County

- Location of Clearfield County in Pennsylvania

- Location within the U.S. state of Pennsylvania Treasure Lake (the United States)
- Coordinates: 41°10′5″N 78°43′16″W
- Country: United States
- State: Pennsylvania
- County: Clearfield
- Township: Sandy

Area
  - Total: 11.4 sq mi (29.6 km^{2})
  - Land: 10.7 sq mi (27.6 km^{2})
  - Water: 0.77 sq mi (2.0 km^{2})
- Elevation: 1,740 ft (530 m)

Population (2020)
  - Total: 5,460
  - Density: 512/sq mi (198/km^{2})
- Time zone: UTC-5 (Eastern (EST))
  - Summer (DST): UTC-4 (EDT)
- ZIP code: 15801
- FIPS code: 42-77335
- GNIS feature ID: 1867510

Treasure Lake is a census-designated place (CDP) in Clearfield County, Pennsylvania, United States. The population was 5,460 at the 2020 census. Treasure Lake is a semi-private, gated community centered around its namesake.

== Geography ==
Treasure Lake is located in the northwestern corner of Clearfield County at 41°10′5″N 78°43′16″W (41.168088, -78.721111). It is an unincorporated community within Sandy Township and is bordered to the north by Jefferson and Elk counties. The city of DuBois is 8 miles (13 km) by road south of the center of the community.

The Treasure Lake community is built around two reservoirs. In the center is Treasure Lake, a water body with three outlets: Wolf Run to the northwest, a tributary of Narrows Creek to the east, and Gravel Lick Run to the south. Bimini Lake, an impoundment on Gravel Lick Run, is in the southern part of the community. All of the lakes' outflows eventually lead to Sandy Lick Creek, part of the Allegheny River basin.

According to the United States Census Bureau, the CDP has a total area of 11.4 square miles (29.6 km^{2}), of which 10.7 square miles (27.6 km^{2}) is land and 0.77 square miles (2.0 km^{2}), or 6.82%, is water.

== Demographics ==
Historical population
Census	Pop.	Note	%±
1990	2,185		—
2000	4,507		106.3%
2010	3,861		−14.3%
2020	5,460		41.4%
U.S. Census Bureau

As of the 2020 census, there were 5,460 people. As of the census of 2010, there were 3,861 people, 1,495 households, and 1,192 families residing in the CDP. The population density was 362 inhabitants per square mile (139.9/km^{2}). There were 2,034 housing units at an average density of 191 per square mile (73.7/km^{2}). The racial makeup of the CDP was 96.5% White, 0.3% Black or African American, 0.0% American Indian and Alaska Native, 2.0% Asian, 0.2% from other races, and 1.0% from two or more races. Hispanic or Latino of any race were 0.8% of the population.

There were 1,495 households, out of which 32% had children under the age of 18 living with them, 71.4% were married couples living together, 5.6% had a female householder with no husband present, and 20.3% were non-families. 16.1% of all households were made up of individuals, and 6.2% had someone living alone who was 65 years of age or older. The average household size was 2.58 and the average family size was 2.88.

In the CDP, the population was spread out, with 22.7% under the age of 18, 5.5% from 18 to 24, 21.1% from 25 to 44, 35% from 45 to 64, and 15.7% who were 65 years of age or older. The median age was 45.5 years. For every 100 females, there were 100.05 males. For every 100 females age 18 and over, there were 99.6 males.

The median income for a household in the CDP was $66,950, and the median income for a family was $74,541. Males had a median income of $55,170 versus $36,047 for females. The per capita income for the CDP was $31,543. About 0.9% of families and 2.4% of the population were below the poverty line, including 1.4% of those under age 18 and 0.0% of those age 65 or over.
