= Huston Township, Clearfield County, Pennsylvania =

Township in Pennsylvania, US

- Township
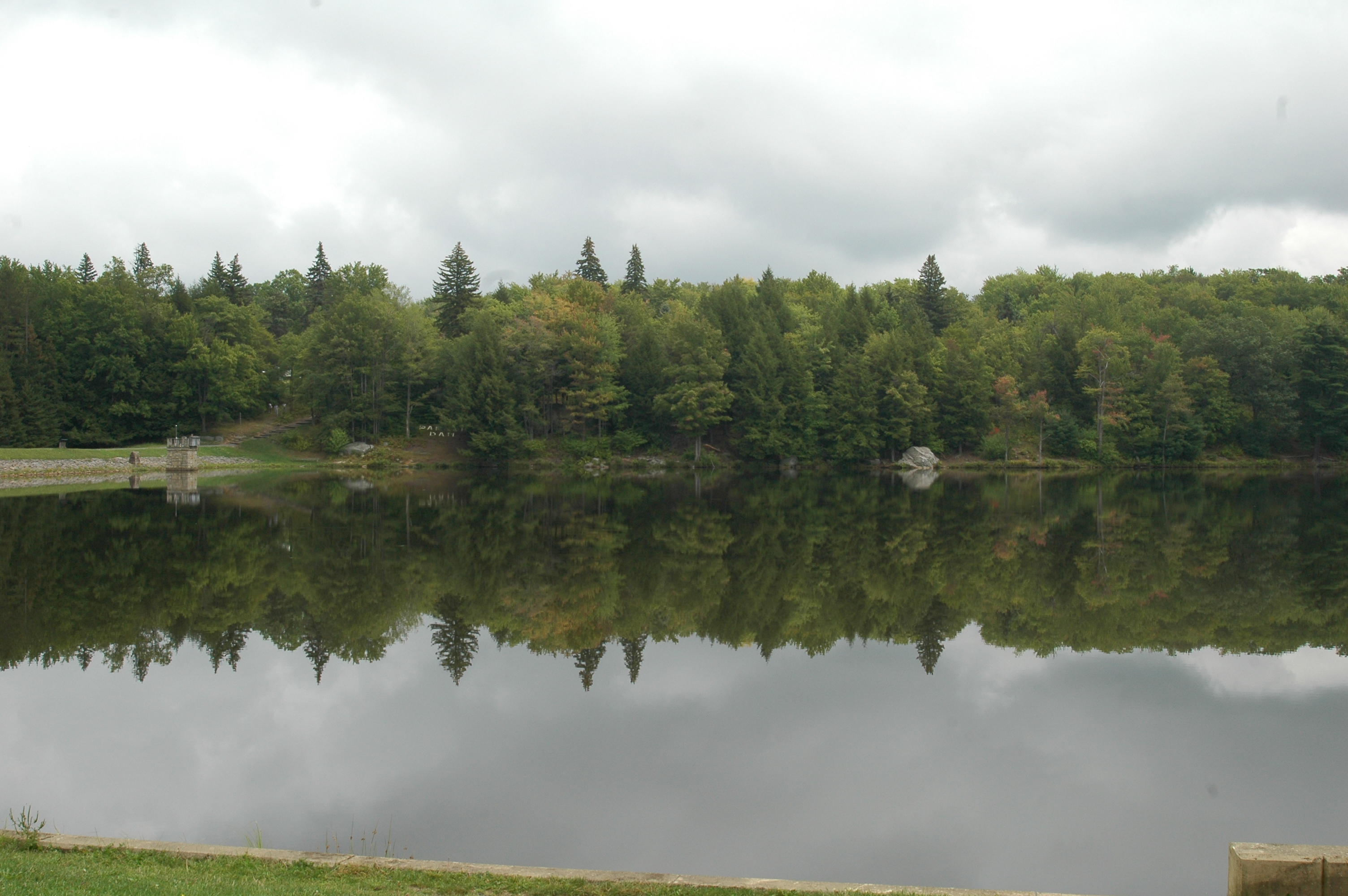
- Parker Lake at Parker Dam State Park

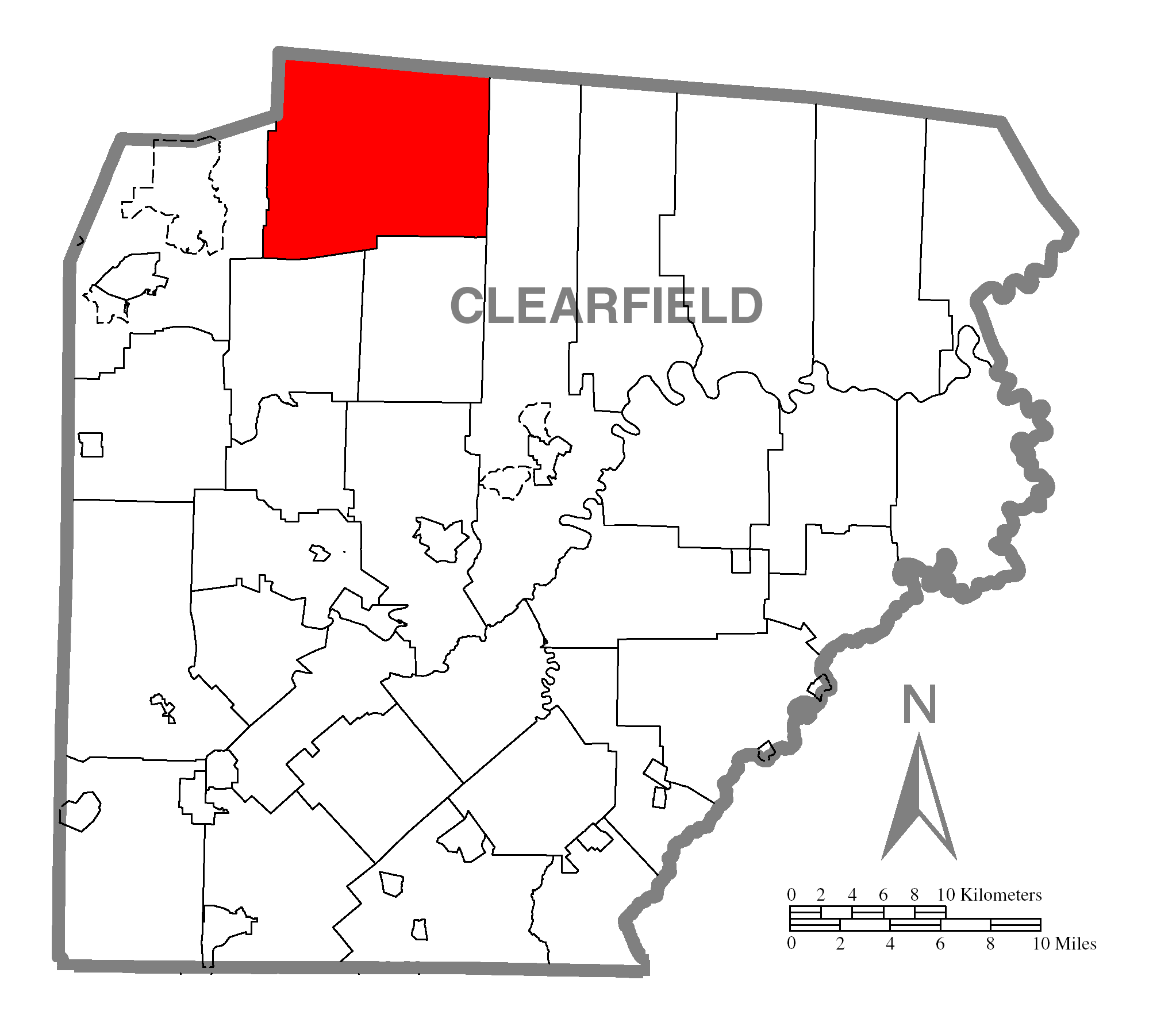
- Map of Clearfield County, Pennsylvania highlighting Huston Township

- Map of Clearfield County, Pennsylvania
- Coordinates: 41°12′30″N 78°29′49″W
- Country: United States
- State: Pennsylvania
- County: Clearfield
- Settled: 1812
- Incorporated: 1839

Area
  - Total: 64.21 sq mi (166.30 km^{2})
  - Land: 64.00 sq mi (165.75 km^{2})
  - Water: 0.21 sq mi (0.55 km^{2})

Population (2020)
  - Total: 1,264 ▼
  - Estimate (2022): 1,249 ▼
  - Density: 21/sq mi (8.3/km^{2})
- Time zone: UTC-5 (Eastern (EST))
  - Summer (DST): UTC-4 (EDT)
- Area code: 814
- FIPS code: 42-033-36512

Huston Township is an American township which is located in Clearfield County, Pennsylvania. The population was 1,264 at the time of the 2020 census.

The unincorporated village of Penfield is located in Huston Township. It is the site of the headquarters for the nearby Moshannon State Forest.

== Geography ==
According to the United States Census Bureau, the township has a total area of 63.7 square miles (165 km^{2}), of which 63.6 square miles (165 km^{2}) is land and 0.04 square miles (0.10 km^{2}) (0.05%) is water.

== Communities ==
- Hollywood
- Hoovertown
- Mill Run
- Mt. Pleasant
- Penfield
- Tyler
- Winterburn

== Demographics ==
Historical population
Census	Pop.	Note	%±
2000	1,468		—
2010	1,433		−2.4%
2020	1,264		−11.8%
2022 (est.)	1,249		−1.2%
U.S. Decennial Census

As of the census of 2000, there were 1,468 people, 607 households, and 417 families residing in the township.

The population density was 23.1 people per square mile (8.9/km^{2}). There were 985 housing units at an average density of 15.5/sq mi (6.0/km^{2}).

The racial makeup of the township was 99.66% White, 0.07% Asian, 0.07% Pacific Islander, and 0.20% from two or more races.

There were 607 households, out of which 31.0% had children under the age of eighteen living with them; 55.4% were married couples living together, 8.2% had a female householder with no husband present, and 31.3% were non-families. 26.2% of all households were made up of individuals, and 11.7% had someone living alone who was sixty-five years of age or older.

The average household size was 2.42 and the average family size was 2.93.

In the township, the population was spread out, with 23.4% under the age of eighteen, 6.8% from eighteen to twenty-four, 30.0% from twenty-five to forty-four, 23.8% from forty-five to sixty-four, and 15.9% who were sixty-five years of age or older. The median age was thirty-eight years.

For every one hundred females, there were 101.1 males. For every one hundred females who were aged eighteen or older, there were 96.5 males.

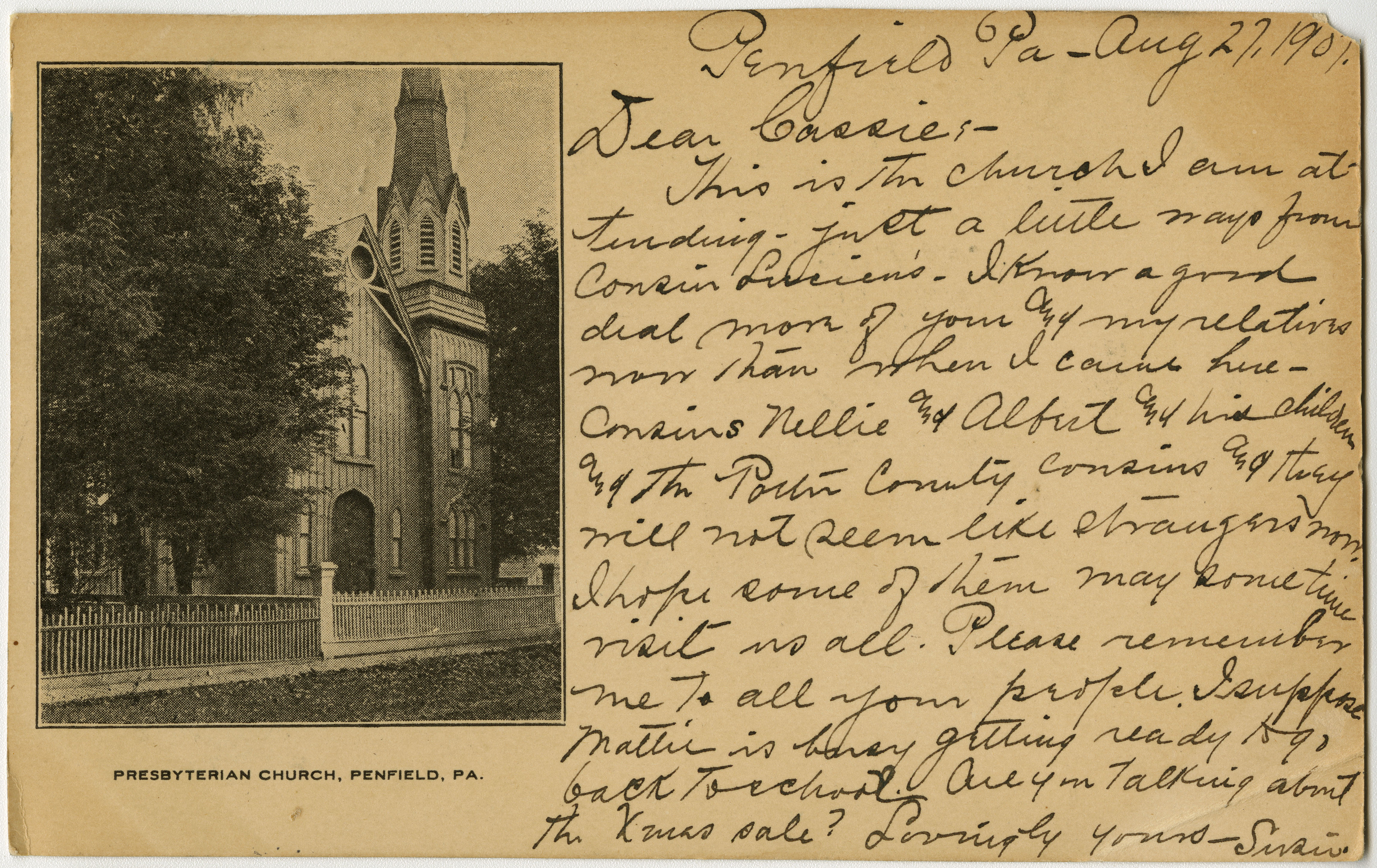
Penfield Presbyterian Church on a 1907 postcard. The church building was still standing in 2007

The median income for a household in the township was $32,614, and the median income for a family was $40,000. Males had a median income of $29,946 compared with that of $19,118 for females.

The per capita income for the township was $16,734.

Roughly 6.4% of families and 9.8% of the population were living below the poverty line, including 14.3% of those who were under the age of eighteen and 9.5% of those who were aged sixty-five or older.

== Education ==
Children in Huston Township attend the Dubois Area School District.
