= Goshen Township, Clearfield County, Pennsylvania =

Township in Pennsylvania, US

Coordinates: 41°10′00″N 78°21′59″W

Goshen Township, Pennsylvania
- Township
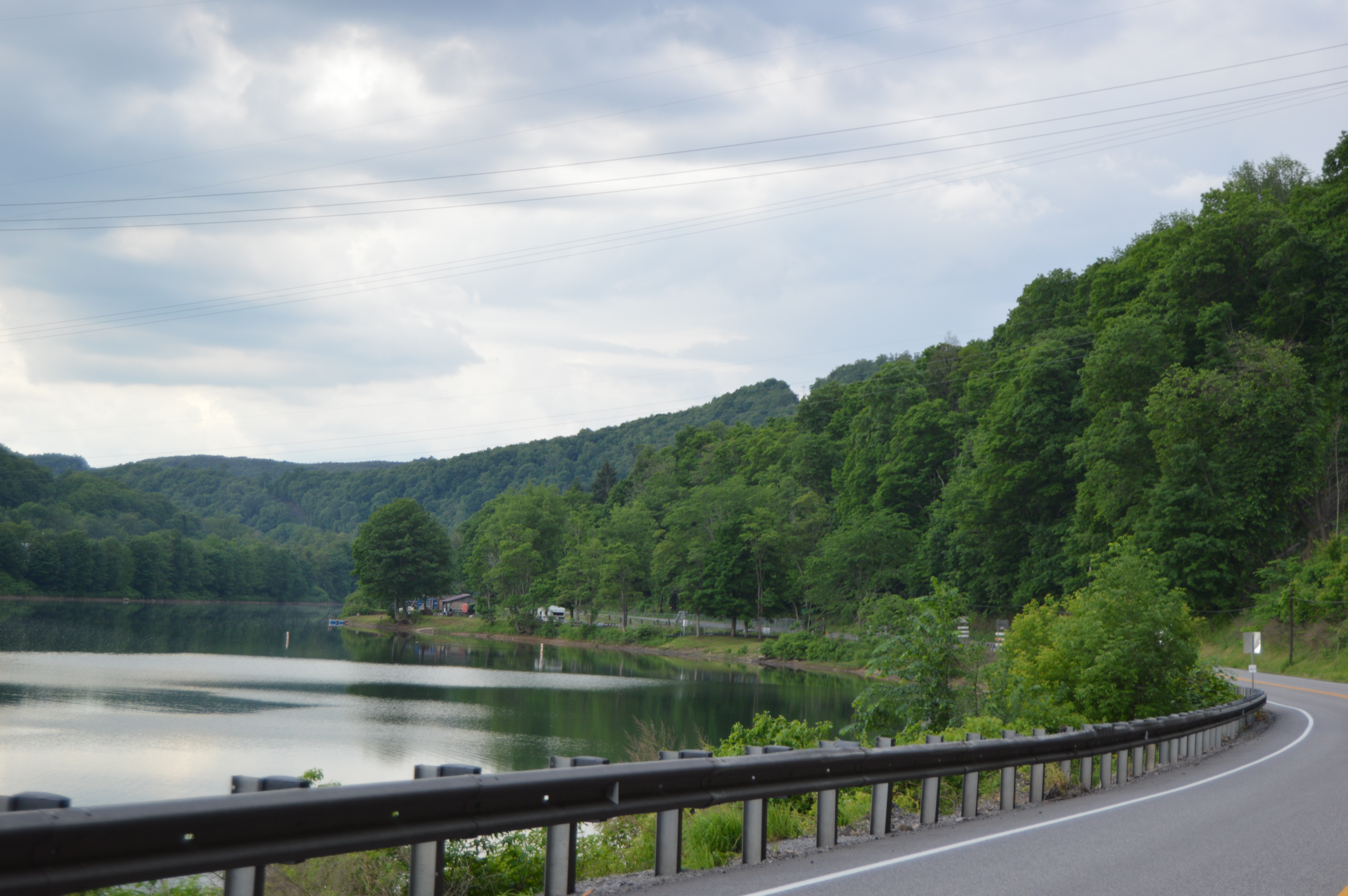
- Along the West Branch Susquehanna River

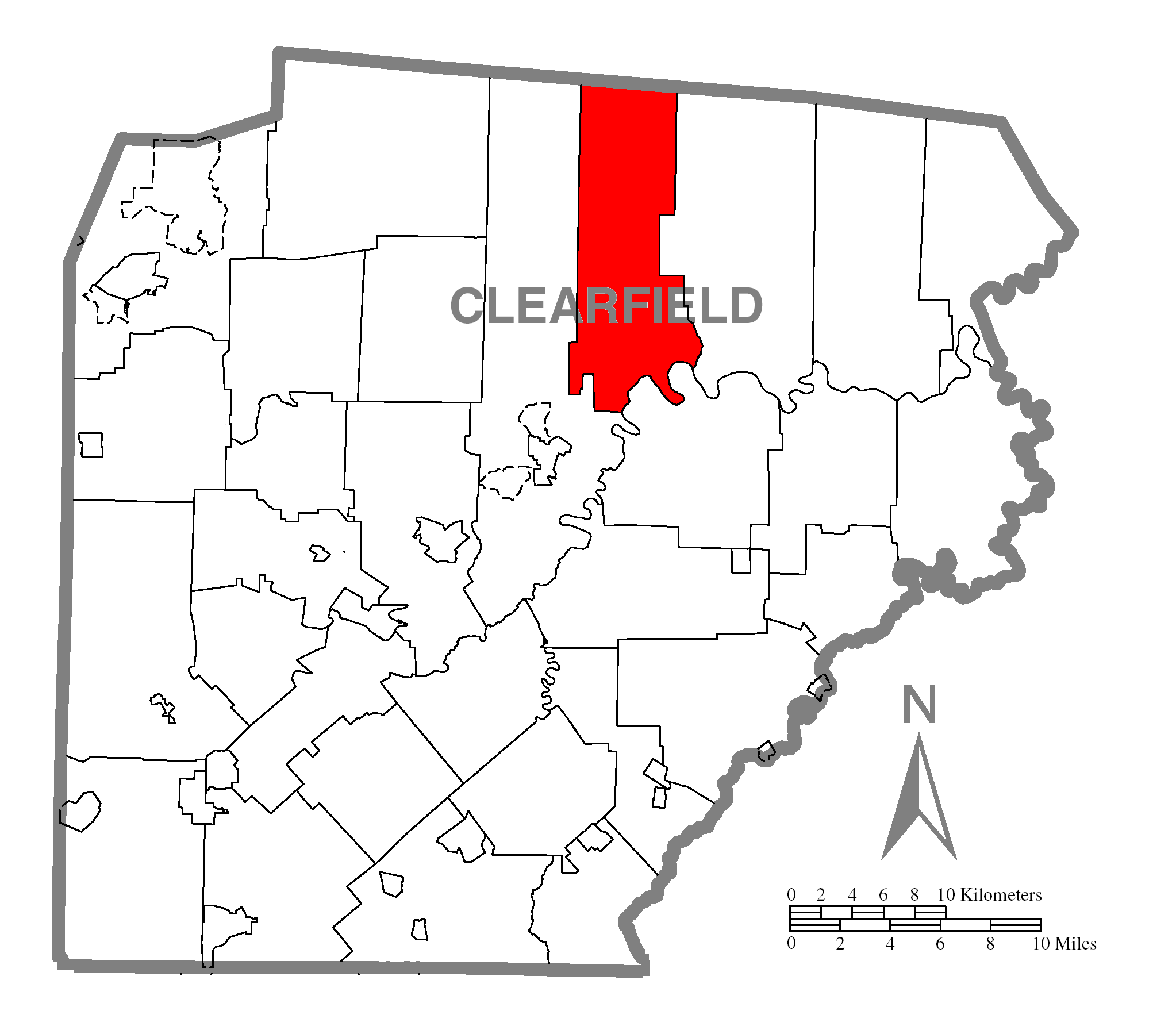
- Map of Clearfield County, Pennsylvania highlighting Goshen Township

- Map of Clearfield County, Pennsylvania
- Country: United States
- State: Pennsylvania
- County: Clearfield
- Settled: 1820
- Incorporated: 1845

Area
  - Total: 48.83 sq mi (126.46 km^{2})
  - Land: 48.57 sq mi (125.80 km^{2})
  - Water: 0.25 sq mi (0.66 km^{2})

Population (2020)
  - Total: 393 ▼
  - Estimate (2022): 394 ▲
  - Density: 8.9/sq mi (3.42/km^{2})
- Time zone: UTC-5 (Eastern (EST))
  - Summer (DST): UTC-4 (EDT)
- Area code: 814
- FIPS code: 42-033-30152
- Website: https://www.goshentwp.com/

Goshen Township is a township in Clearfield County, Pennsylvania, United States. The population was 393 at the 2020 census.

== Geography ==
According to the United States Census Bureau, the township has a total area of 49.4 square miles (128 km^{2}), of which 49.2 square miles (127 km^{2}) is land and 0.2 square miles (0.52 km^{2}) (0.38%) is water.

== Communities ==
- Croft
- Eden
- Goshen
- Huntley
- Shawville

== Demographics ==
Historical population
Census	Pop.	Note	%±
2000	496		—
2010	435		−12.3%
2020	393		−9.7%
2022 (est.)	394		0.3%
U.S. Decennial Census

As of the census of 2000, there were 496 people, 190 households, and 139 families residing in the township. The population density was 10.1 people per square mile (3.9/km^{2}). There were 331 housing units at an average density of 6.7/sq mi (2.6/km^{2}). The racial makeup of the township was 99.80% White and 0.20% Native American.

There were 190 households, out of which 31.1% had children under the age of 18 living with them, 58.9% were married couples living together, 7.4% had a female householder with no husband present, and 26.8% were non-families. 21.1% of all households were made up of individuals, and 9.5% had someone living alone who was 65 years of age or older. The average household size was 2.61 and the average family size was 3.05.

In the township the population was spread out, with 25.4% under the age of 18, 8.7% from 18 to 24, 30.4% from 25 to 44, 21.2% from 45 to 64, and 14.3% who were 65 years of age or older. The median age was 36 years. For every 100 females there were 102.4 males. For every 100 females age 18 and over, there were 105.6 males.

The median income for a household in the township was $28,000, and the median income for a family was $35,000. Males had a median income of $25,250 versus $17,000 for females. The per capita income for the township was $12,255. About 10.0% of families and 17.5% of the population were below the poverty line, including 20.2% of those under age 18 and 10.0% of those age 65 or over.

== Education ==
Students in Goshen Township attend schools in the Clearfield Area School District.
