= Hepburnia Coal Company =

Hepburnia Coal Company is a surface mining operator in central Pennsylvania.The company was formed by Donald M. and Lula Mae Spencer of Grampian, Pennsylvania in 1955. Shortly after its incorporation Darrell G., Ray L. and Robert G. Spencer - the children of the founders - joined the firm. The firm grew into one of the largest surface mining operators in Central Pennsylvania.

The Hepburnia Coal Company has expanded by forming the Spencer Land Company (land holding division), Hepburnia Coal Sales Corp. (coal sales to utilities), Susquehanna Recreation Corp. (golf course and resort development), Beechwoods Flying Service (airline charter company for rotary and fixed wing services), Seven Seas Financial Corp. (hotel development), and the Penn-Grampian Television Cable Co. (local cable provider). In the 1990s, Hepburnia Coal Company acquired the Shale Hill Coal Company of Hepburnia, Pennsylvania.

In 1991 Hepburnia Coal Company was selected to provide the Pennsylvania Christmas Tree for the National Pageant of Peace at the White House. The tree was presented to President George H.W. Bush by company Chairman Robert G. Spencer.

As of 2006, Hepburnia Coal Company is headquartered in Grampian, Pennsylvania. The firm continues to mine and ship bituminous coal and is engaged in several other lines of business. At this date, the president and chief executive officer is Darrell G. Spencer. His brother Ray L. Spencer died in 2005; Robert G. Spencer died in 2012. Shad B. Spencer serves as vice president and Tim N. Morgan as Secretary and Treasurer of the company.
