= Hyde, Pennsylvania =

Unincorporated community in Pennsylvania, US

Hyde
- Census-designated place
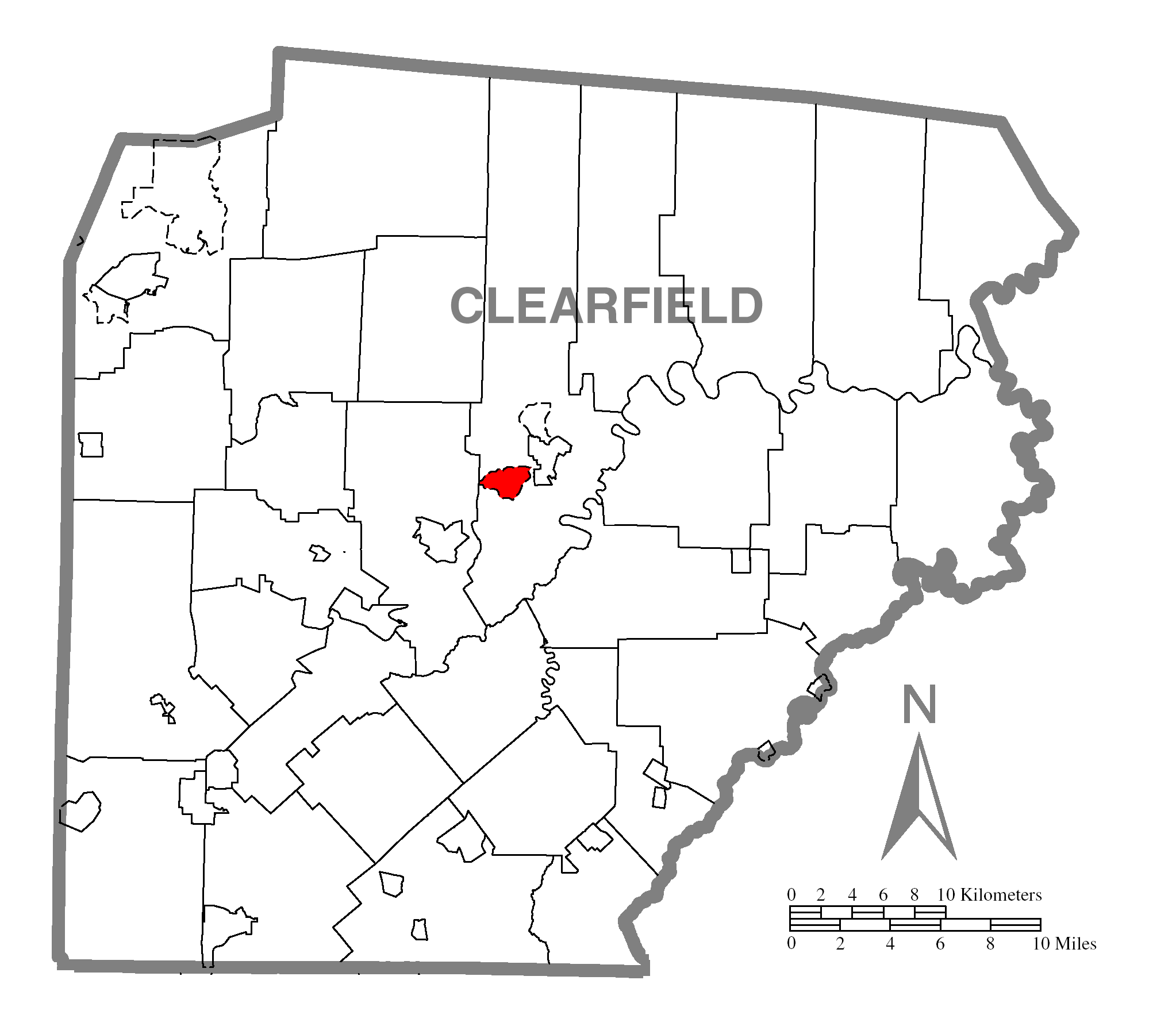
- Location of Hyde in Clearfield County
- Coordinates: 41°00′11″N 78°27′47″W
- Country: United States
- State: Pennsylvania
- County: Clearfield
- Township: Lawrence

Area
  - Total: 1.71 sq mi (4.42 km^{2})
  - Land: 1.68 sq mi (4.35 km^{2})
  - Water: 0.031 sq mi (0.08 km^{2})
- Elevation: 1,110 ft (340 m)

Population (2020)
  - Total: 1,303
  - Density: 776.2/sq mi (299.71/km^{2})
- Time zone: UTC-5 (EST)
  - Summer (DST): UTC-4 (EDT)
- ZIP code: 16843
- Area code: 814
- FIPS code: 42-36568

Hyde is an unincorporated community and census-designated place (CDP) in Clearfield County, Pennsylvania, United States. The population was 1,303 at the 2020 census.

== Geography ==
Hyde is located in the western part of Lawrence Township at 41°0′11″N 78°27′47″W (41.003057, -78.463096), on the southwestern side of Clearfield, the county seat. It is located on the northwestern side of the West Branch Susquehanna River. Pennsylvania Route 879 passes just south of the community.

According to the United States Census Bureau, the CDP has a total area of 1.7 square miles (4.3 km^{2}), of which 0.008 square miles (0.02 km^{2}), or 0.45%, is water.

== Demographics ==
Historical population
Year	Pop.	±%
1990	1,643	—
2000	1,491	−9.3%
2010	1,399	−6.2%
2020	1,303	−6.9%
Source: U.S. Decennial Census

As of the census of 2000, there were 1,491 people, 636 households, and 445 families living in the CDP. The population density was 900.7 inhabitants per square mile (347.8/km^{2}). There were 697 housing units at an average density of 421.0 per square mile (162.5/km^{2}). The racial makeup of the CDP was 98.99% White, 0.27% Asian, and 0.74% from two or more races. Hispanic or Latino of any race were 0.40% of the population.

There were 636 households, out of which 27.2% had children under the age of 18 living with them, 52.2% were married couples living together, 13.4% had a female householder with no husband present, and 30.0% were non-families. 26.3% of all households were made up of individuals, and 11.9% had someone living alone who was 65 years of age or older. The average household size was 2.34 and the average family size was 2.80.

In the CDP, the population was spread out, with 23.5% under the age of 18, 6.2% from 18 to 24, 27.8% from 25 to 44, 24.4% from 45 to 64, and 18.1% who were 65 years of age or older. The median age was 39 years. For every 100 females, there were 94.6 males. For every 100 females age 18 and over, there were 88.9 males.

The median income for a household in the CDP was $24,342, and the median income for a family was $33,895. Males had a median income of $26,853 versus $18,882 for females. The per capita income for the CDP was $12,645. About 16.2% of families and 21.4% of the population were below the poverty line, including 43.8% of those under age 18 and 9.8% of those age 65 or over.
