= National Register of Historic Places listings in Clearfield County, Pennsylvania =

Location of Clearfield County in Pennsylvania

This is a list of the National Register of Historic Places listings in Clearfield County, Pennsylvania.

This is intended to be a complete list of the properties and districts on the National Register of Historic Places in Clearfield County, Pennsylvania, United States. The locations of National Register properties and districts for which the latitude and longitude coordinates are included below, may be seen in a map.

There are 20 properties and districts listed on the National Register in the county. Another property was once listed but has been removed.

This National Park Service list is complete through NPS recent listings posted May 1, 2026.

== Current listings ==
	Name on the Register	Image	Date listed	Location	City or town	Description
1	Bridge in Greenwood Township	Bridge in Greenwood Township	June 22, 1988 (#88000846)	Legislative Route 17026 over the West Branch of the Susquehanna River; 40°54′39″N 78°38′51″W	Greenwood Township	Pratt through truss bridge built in 1892. Now torn down.
2	Bridge in Westover Borough	Bridge in Westover Borough	June 22, 1988 (#88000736)	Legislative Route 17003/Township Route 185 over Chest Creek; 40°45′09″N 78°40′03″W	Westover	Open-spandrel arch bridge constructed in 1917.
3	Clearfield Armory	Clearfield Armory	December 22, 1989 (#89002072)	Coal Hill Road; 41°00′44″N 78°27′45″W	Lawrence Township	Brick armory dating to 1938.
4	Clearfield County Courthouse	Clearfield County Courthouse	April 27, 1979 (#79002210)	2nd and Market Streets; 41°01′20″N 78°26′16″W	Clearfield	County courthouse building constructed in 1860.
5	Coalport Historic District	Coalport Historic District	April 29, 1999 (#99000517)	Along Main Street, roughly from Mill to Walnut Streets; 40°44′54″N 78°32′07″W	Coalport	
6	Commercial Hotel	Commercial Hotel	November 13, 1985 (#85003507)	Long and Brady Avenues; 41°07′07″N 78°45′44″W	DuBois	Four story brick structure dating back to 1889; includes Harris-DuBois Theater.
7	Dimeling Hotel	Dimeling Hotel	April 10, 1980 (#80003474)	2nd and Market Streets; 41°01′20″N 78°26′19″W	Clearfield	Seven story former hotel constructed in 1904-1905.
8	DuBois Historic District	DuBois Historic District	October 24, 1997 (#97001254)	Roughly along North and South Brady Streets, and East and West Long Avenues; 41°07′09″N 78°45′47″W	Dubois	
9	S.B. Elliott State Park Day Use District	S.B. Elliott State Park Day Use District	February 11, 1987 (#87000023)	9 miles (14 km) north of Clearfield on Pennsylvania Route 153; 41°06′47″N 78°31′36″W	Pine Township	
10	S.B. Elliott State Park Family Cabin District	S.B. Elliott State Park Family Cabin District	February 11, 1987 (#87000024)	9 miles (14 km) north of Clearfield on Pennsylvania Route 153; 41°06′39″N 78°31′23″W	Pine Township	
11	Hogback Bridge	Hogback Bridge	June 22, 1988 (#88000848)	Legislative Route 869 over the West Branch of the Susquehanna River; 40°58′25″N 78°29′26″W	Lawrence Township	Pennsylvania (petit) truss bridge built in 1893. Modern bridge replaced the historic structure, which is now gone.
12	Irvin-Patchin House	Irvin-Patchin House	June 19, 1979 (#79002209)	Main Street; 40°48′59″N 78°47′13″W	Burnside	Brick dwelling constructed initially in 1850 by early settler William Irvin.
13	McGees Mills Covered Bridge	McGees Mills Covered Bridge	April 17, 1980 (#80003475)	West of Mahaffey; 40°52′48″N 78°45′55″W	Bell Township	A 109-foot (33 m) covered bridge built in 1873.
14	Thomas Murray House	Thomas Murray House	October 25, 1979 (#79002211)	120 S. 2nd St. 41°01′12″N 78°26′17″W	Clearfield	Italianate style brick dwelling constructed in 1876.
15	Old Town Historic District	Old Town Historic District	May 15, 1979 (#79002212)	Irregular pattern along Front Street; 41°01′20″N 78°26′24″W	Clearfield	
16	Parker Dam State Park Family Cabin District	Parker Dam State Park Family Cabin District	February 11, 1987 (#87000043)	5 miles (8.0 km) south of Penfield off Pennsylvania Route 153; 41°11′49″N 78°30′56″W	Huston Township	
17	Parker Dam State Park-Octagonal Lodge	Parker Dam State Park-Octagonal Lodge	May 11, 1987 (#87000044)	5 miles (8.0 km) south of Penfield off Pennsylvania Route 153; 41°12′32″N 78°30′11″W	Huston Township	
18	Parker Dam State Park-Parker Dam District	Parker Dam State Park-Parker Dam District	February 11, 1987 (#87000049)	5 miles (8.0 km) south of Penfield off Pennsylvania Route 153; 41°11′54″N 78°30′29″W	Huston Township	
19	Joseph F. and Anna B. Schrot Farm	Joseph F. and Anna B. Schrot Farm	September 8, 2011 (#11000643)	880 Carbon Mine Road; 40°58′57″N 78°29′15″W	Lawrence Township	
20	St. Severin's Old Log Church	St. Severin's Old Log Church	June 5, 1975 (#75001633)	West of Cooper Settlement off Pennsylvania Route 53; 41°01′54″N 78°06′38″W	Cooper Township	Roman Catholic church built by German settlers in about 1851.

== Former listing ==
	Name on the Register	Image	Date listed	Date removed	Location	City or town	Description
1	DuBois Mansion	DuBois Mansion	April 16, 1975 (#75001634)	January 21, 1983	College Pl.	DuBois	The DuBois Mansion existed from 1875-1978. The originally Italianate building was remodeled to Tudor in 1902 as shown in this image. After 1934 it became part of the Penn State Campus. A frozen and burst water pipe damaged the building heavily and in 1978 - despite appeals and fundraising - the building was demolished. Currently the site of DuBois campus of Penn State University and the DuBois Area High School.

== See also ==
- List of National Historic Landmarks in Pennsylvania
- National Register of Historic Places listings in Pennsylvania
- List of Pennsylvania state historical markers in Clearfield County
