= Purchase Line School District =

School district in Pennsylvania

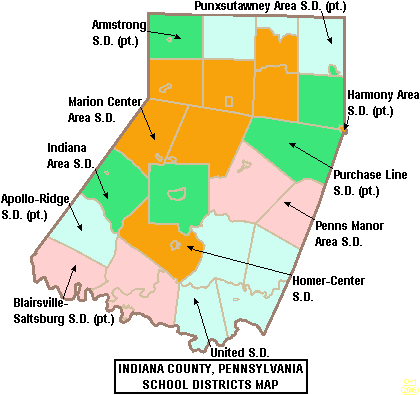

Address
- 16559 Rte 286 Hwy E Commodore, Clearfield County and Indiana County, Pennsylvania, 15729; United States

District information
- Type: Public
- Established: 1954

Students and staff
- District mascot: Red Dragons
- Colors: Red and gray

Other information
- Website: www.plsd.k12.pa.us

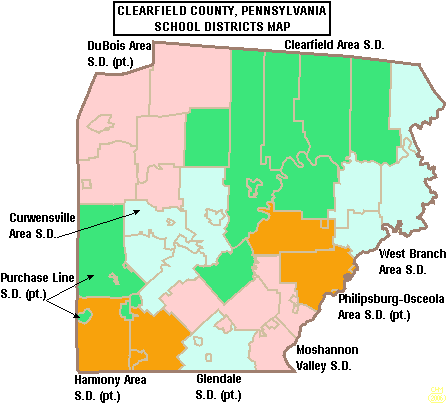
Purchase Line SD in Clearfield County

Purchase Line School District is a small, public school district located in central Pennsylvania which covers small areas in two counties. It serves a rural region, including the townships of Montgomery and Green, and the Borough of Glen Campbell in Indiana County. It also serves the Boroughs of New Washington, Burnside, Mahaffey, Newburg, and Bell Township in Clearfield County. Purchase Line School District encompasses approximately 144 square miles (370 km^{2}). According to 2000 federal census data, Purchase Line Area School District serves a resident population of 7,687. In 2009, the District residents’ per capita income was $12,174, while the median family income was $31,893. In the Commonwealth, the median family income was $49,501 and the United States median family income was $49,445, in 2010.

== History ==
Purchase Line was established in 1954, and soon after, the Purchase Line Junior/Senior High School and the present South Elementary was built. In 1976, the North and South Elementary Schools were constructed. The Jr.-Sr. High School was renovated at the beginning of the 21st-century. In 2011, the school board announced an intention to close North Elementary School.

== Schools ==
School name Grade level	Address
Purchase Line Junior/Senior High School; Grades 7-12	16559 Rte. 286 Hwy. E. Commodore, Pennsylvania 15729
South Elementary School; Grades K-6	16957 Rte. 286 Hwy. E. Commodore, Pennsylvania 15729

== Extracurriculars ==
Purchase Line School District offers a variety of clubs, activities and an extensive sports program.

=== Sports ===
The District funds:

Boys

- Baseball - AA
- Basketball- AA
- Cross country - A
- Football - A
- Track and field - AA

Girls

- Basketball - A
- Cross country - A
- Softball - A
- Track and field - AA
- Volleyball - A

Junior high school sports

Boys

- Basketball
- Football

Girls

- Basketball
- Volleyball

According to PIAA directory July 2012
