= Bloody Knox =

1864 American Civil War skirmish

Bloody Knox was a Civil War resistance skirmish that occurred on December 13, 1864 in Knox Township, Clearfield County in central Pennsylvania. Two people were killed and 18 arrested in the resistance.

== Civil War Drafts ==
During the American Civil War, a Conscription Act was passed to enable a draft to help provide support in the war against the Confederacy. By August 1864, Clearfield County had a 600-man draft list, however, due to the resentment towards the war as well as President Lincoln's draft request, and the low-income residents of the area only 150 men reported. Similarly, just after the Battle of Gettysburg, resistance occurred in New York City and what is known as the New York City draft riots of 1863.

== Resistance ==
By 1863, most of Clearfield County was opposed to the ongoing civil war. In June 1863 Marshal David Cathcart was shot in Knox Township by draft dodgers working as loggers. In Graham Township, houses were set on fire, while deserters looted throughout the county. Copperheads liberated deserters in Troutville. Recruitment officer Col. Cyrus Butler was killed in Lawrence Township in October 1864. These actions caused the government to send troops to Clearfield County by late 1864.

== Tom Adams ==
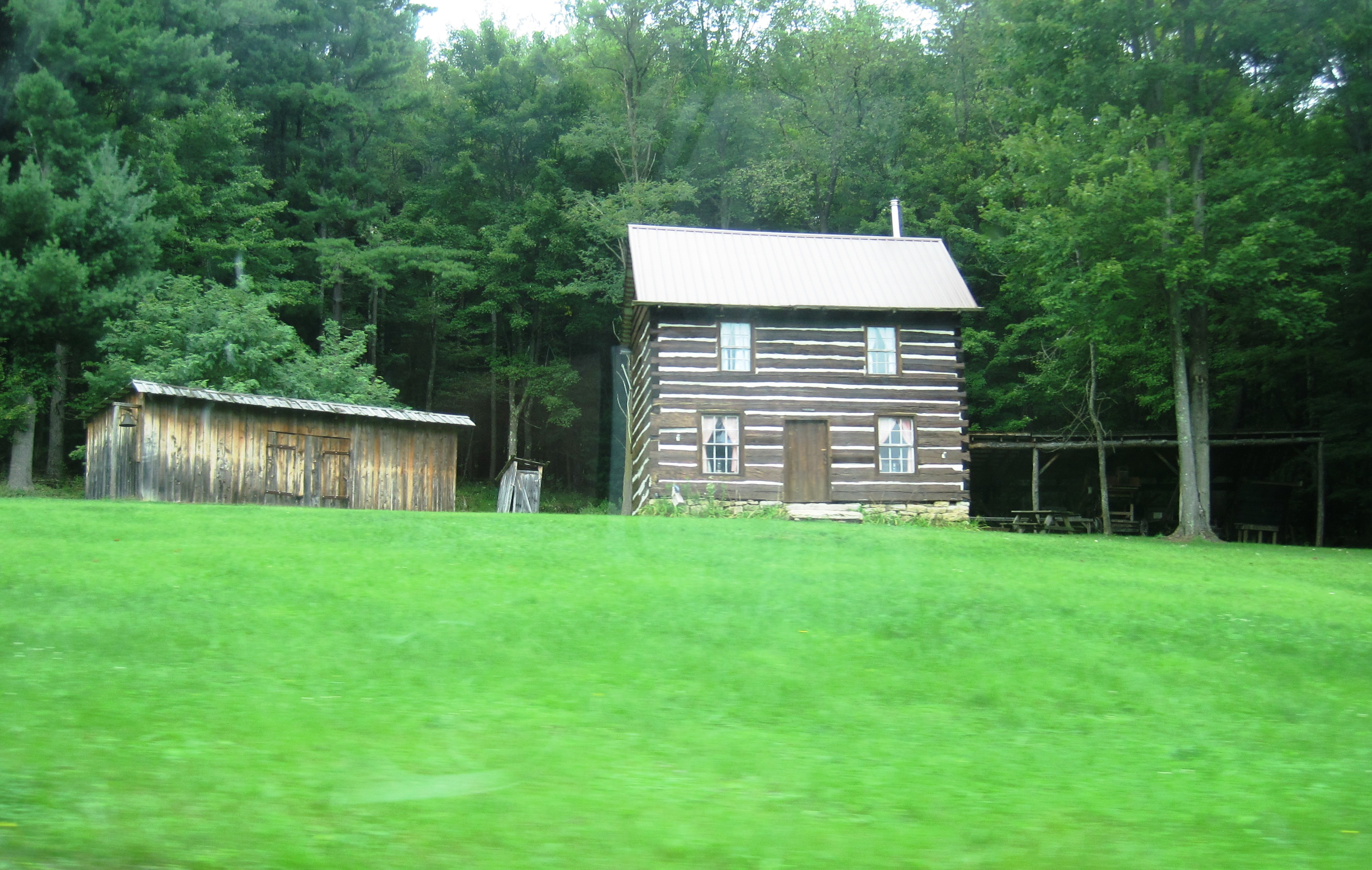
Tom Adams's log cabin, site of the December 1864 skirmish

Troops of the 16th Vermont Regiment, Company C under the command of Captain Southworth marched into the area from Philipsburg. They arrived on the night of December 13, 1864, at the log cabin home of Tom Adams. The cabin was housing several deserters including Tom Adams. The troops surrounded the log home, and shots were fired from the window by Adams, killing soldier Edgar Reed. Adams was shot and killed by the return fire from the troops. During the skirmish, two men were killed and 18 arrested. Within a month 150 men were incarcerated from the resistance.

== Annual festival ==
Each year in fall, the area has a reenactment of the fight, as well as an apple cider outing. A historical marker is located near the site along Pennsylvania Route 453 in southern Knox Township, near the village of Kellytown.

== See also ==
- American Civil War
