= Mahaffey, Pennsylvania =

Borough in Pennsylvania, US

- Borough
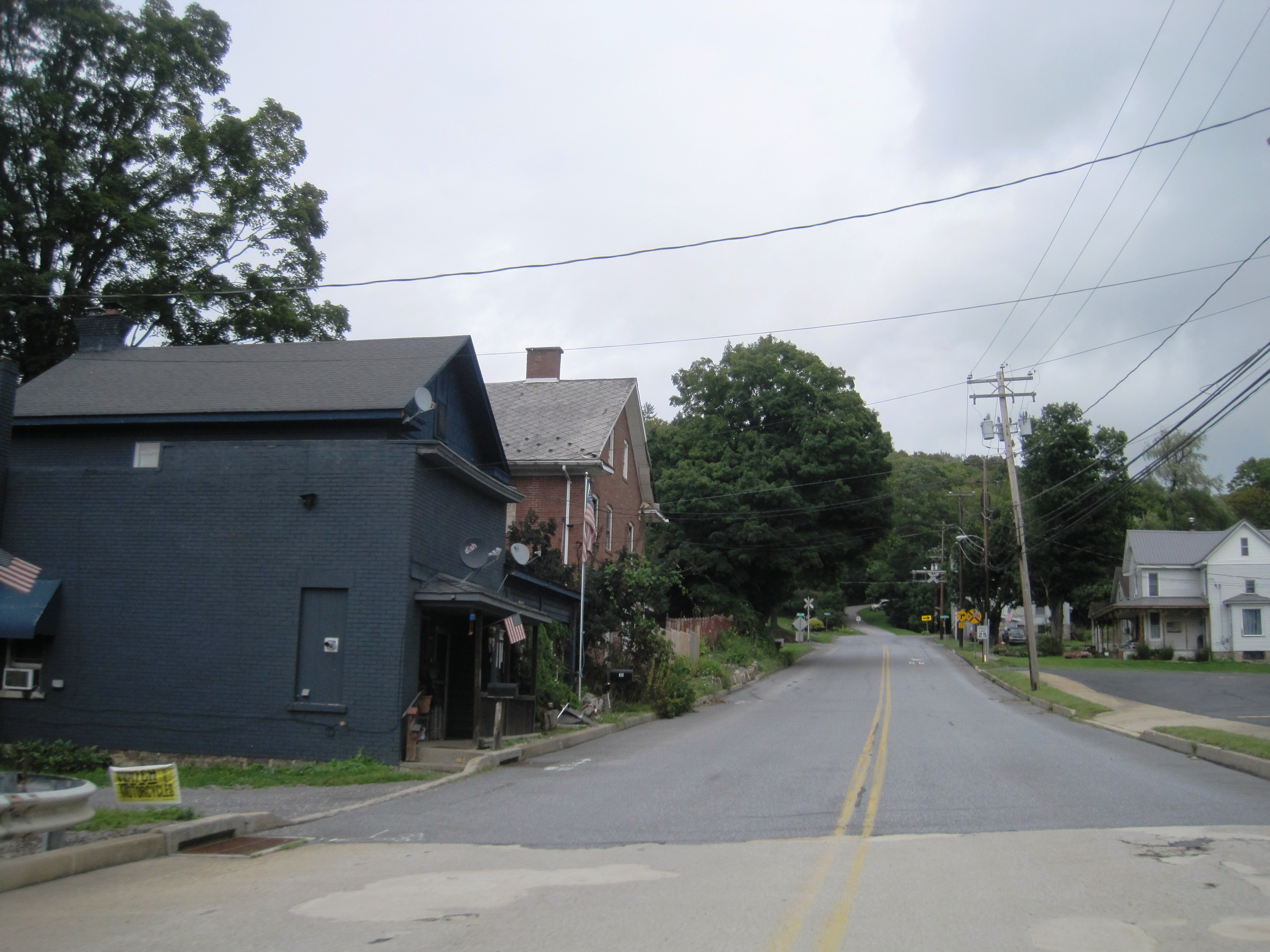
- Southbound PA 36 (Market Street)

- Location of Mahaffey in Clearfield County, Pennsylvania.

- Location of Clearfield County in Pennsylvania

- Location in Pennsylvania
- Coordinates: 40°52′33″N 78°43′41″W
- Country: United States
- State: Pennsylvania
- County: Clearfield
- Settled: 1841
- Incorporated: 1889

Government
  - Type: Borough Council

Area
  - Total: 0.44 sq mi (1.13 km^{2})
  - Land: 0.43 sq mi (1.11 km^{2})
  - Water: 0.0077 sq mi (0.02 km^{2})
- Elevation: 1,320 ft (400 m)

Population (2020)
  - Total: 329
  - Density: 768.5/sq mi (296.72/km^{2})
- Time zone: UTC-5 (Eastern (EST))
  - Summer (DST): UTC-4 (EDT)
- ZIP code: 15757
- Area code: 814
- FIPS code: 42-46568

Mahaffey is a borough in Clearfield County, Pennsylvania, United States. The population was 329 at the 2020 census.

The community is served by U.S. Route 219.

== History ==
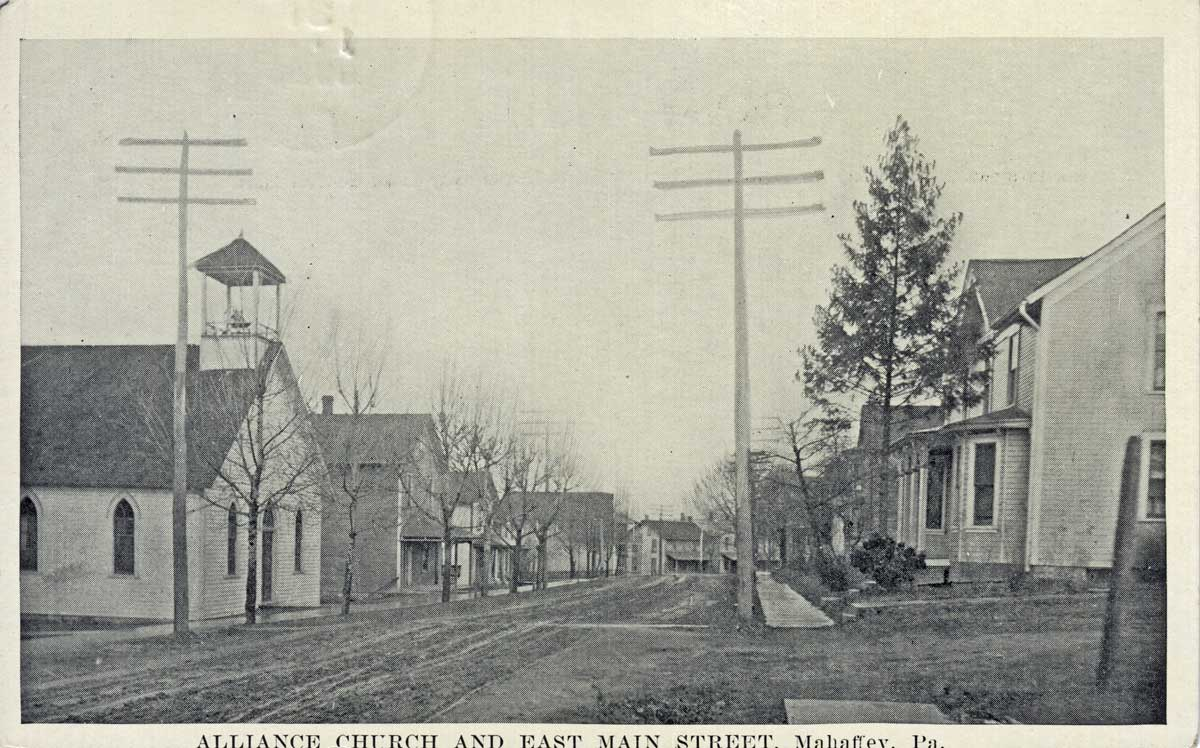
East Main Street, c. 1923

The borough was founded by Robert Mahaffey in 1841, at a point where Chest Creek flows into the West Branch Susquehanna River.

First called "Franklin", the borough was incorporated in 1841. At the time it had a public school, four churches, a grist mill and a tannery.

Mahaffey was located at the junction of the New York Central & Hudson River Railroad and the Pennsylvania & Northwestern Railroad.

== Geography ==
Mahaffey is located in southwestern Clearfield County at 40°52′33″N 78°43′41″W. U.S. Route 219 passes through the borough, leading northeast 11 miles (18 km) to Grampian and southwest 8 miles (13 km) to Burnside.

According to the United States Census Bureau, Mahaffey has a total area of 0.44 square miles (1.13 km^{2}), of which 0.43 square miles (1.11 km^{2}) is land and 0.008 square miles (0.02 km^{2}), or 1.92%, is water.

== Demographics ==
Historical population
Census	Pop.	Note	%±
1890	627		—
1900	741		18.2%
1910	754		1.8%
1920	801		6.2%
1930	667		−16.7%
1940	609		−8.7%
1950	646		6.1%
1960	582		−9.9%
1970	482		−17.2%
1980	513		6.4%
1990	341		−33.5%
2000	402		17.9%
2010	368		−8.5%
2020	329		−10.6%
2021 (est.)	323	▼	−1.8%

As of the census of 2000, there were 402 people, 142 households, and 105 families residing in the borough. The population density was 1,085.5 inhabitants per square mile (419.1/km^{2}). There were 157 housing units at an average density of 423.9 per square mile (163.7/km^{2}). The racial makeup of the borough was 100.00% White.

There were 142 households, out of which 34.5% had children under the age of 18 living with them, 60.6% were married couples living together, 7.0% had a female householder with no husband present, and 25.4% were non-families. 24.6% of all households were made up of individuals, and 15.5% had someone living alone who was 65 years of age or older. The average household size was 2.83 and the average family size was 3.38.

In the borough the population was spread out, with 27.6% under the age of 18, 6.5% from 18 to 24, 26.1% from 25 to 44, 23.1% from 45 to 64, and 16.7% who were 65 years of age or older. The median age was 40 years. For every 100 females there were 100.0 males. For every 100 females age 18 and over, there were 99.3 males.

The median income for a household in the borough was $28,750, and the median income for a family was $31,250. Males had a median income of $21,250 versus $20,000 for females. The per capita income for the borough was $11,320. About 6.0% of families and 12.2% of the population were below the poverty line, including 25.2% of those under age 18 and none of those age 65 or over.

== Parks and recreation ==
Located north of the borough is Mahaffey Camp, a camp and conference center affiliated with the Christian and Missionary Alliance.

McGees Mills Covered Bridge is located west of Mahaffey near U.S. Route 219 in Bell Township. It is one of several rebuilt covered bridges in Pennsylvania, and is listed on the National Register of Historic Places.

== Education ==
The community is served by the Purchase Line School District.

== Notable person ==
- Melvin L. Brown; awarded a Medal of Honor for his actions in the Korean War.
