= James L. Snyder =

American writer (born 1951)

- Born: July 21, 1951 (age 75); US
- Occupation: Writer
- Spouse: Martha
- Children: 3
- Website: www.jamessnyderministries.com/page/page/5762373.htm

James Lucion Snyder (born July 21, 1951) is an American writer. He is a minister with the Christian and Missionary Alliance and an author and humorist whose writings have appeared in more than eighty periodicals including Guideposts. Snyder's first book, his 1991 biography of A.W. Tozer, In Pursuit of God: The Life of A. W. Tozer, won the Reader's Choice Award in 1992 from Christianity Today. Snyder has written 25 books.

Through fifty years of ministry, he and his wife Martha have been involved in three church planting projects prior to their current ministry at the Family of God Fellowship in Ocala, Florida. The Snyders have three children.
