= Newburg, Clearfield County, Pennsylvania =

Borough in Pennsylvania, US

Newburg, Pennsylvania
- Borough
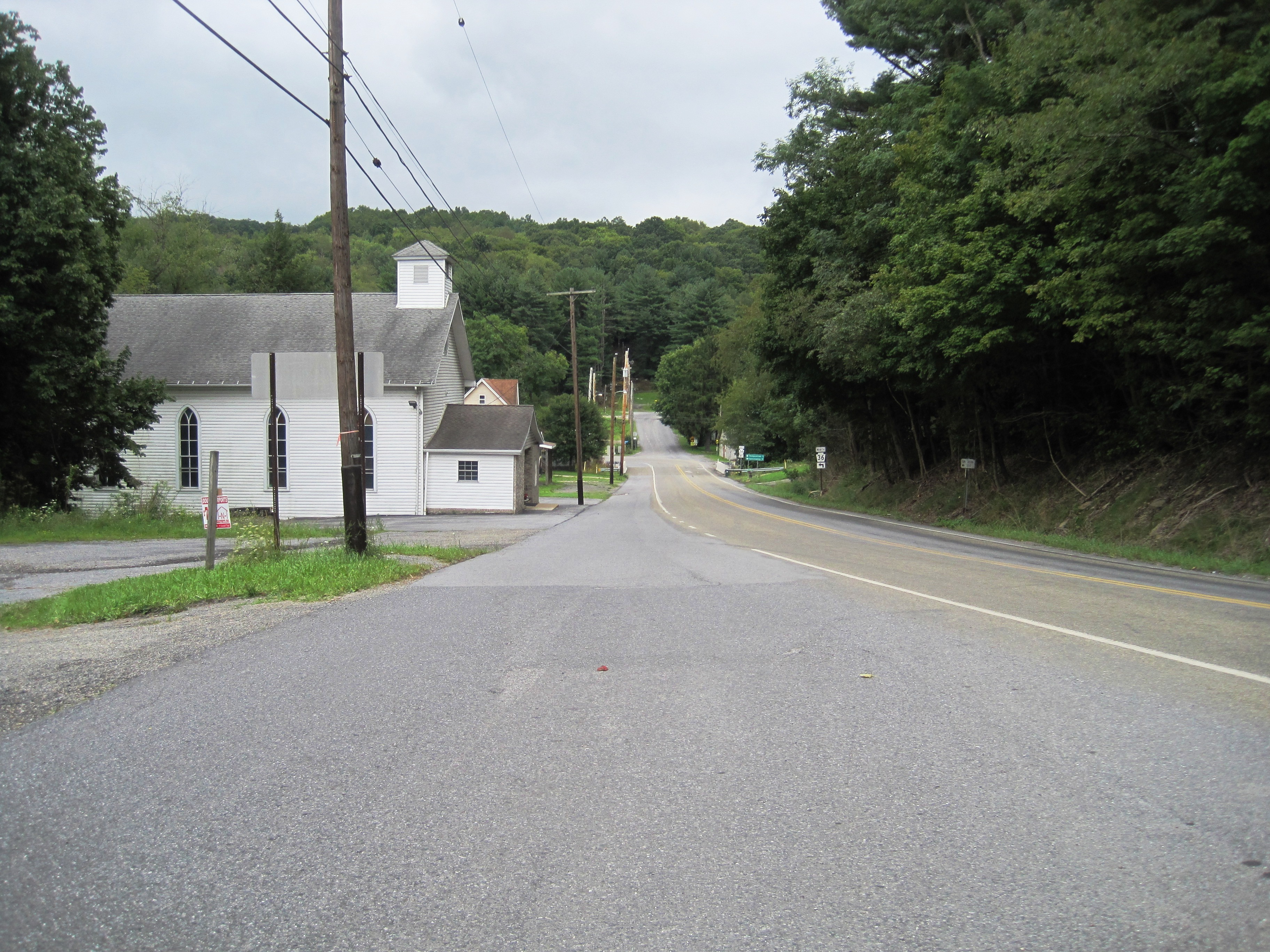
- Northbound PA 36 in Newburg

- Location of Newburg in Clearfield County, Pennsylvania

- Location of Clearfield County in Pennsylvania

- Location in Pennsylvania
- Coordinates: 40°50′06″N 78°40′51″W
- Country: United States
- State: Pennsylvania
- County: Clearfield
- Incorporated: 1885

Government
  - Type: Borough Council

Area
  - Total: 1.85 sq mi (4.80 km^{2})
  - Land: 1.85 sq mi (4.78 km^{2})
  - Water: 0.0077 sq mi (0.02 km^{2})
- Elevation: 1,320 ft (400 m)

Population (2020)
  - Total: 82
  - Density: 44.4/sq mi (17.16/km^{2})
- Time zone: UTC-5 (Eastern (EST))
  - Summer (DST): UTC-4 (EDT)
- ZIP code: 15753
- Area code: 814
- FIPS code: 42-53336
- GNIS feature ID: 1215106

Newburg (also known as La Jose) is a borough in Clearfield County, Pennsylvania, United States. The population was 82 at the 2020 census.

== Geography ==
Newburg is located in southwestern Clearfield County at 40°50′6″N 78°40′51″W (40.834994, -78.680902), along Chest Creek, a tributary of the West Branch Susquehanna River. It is bordered to the southwest by the borough of New Washington. Pennsylvania Route 36 passes through Newburg, leading northwest (downstream) 3.7 miles (6.0 km) to Mahaffey and south (upstream) 7 miles (11 km) to Westover.

According to the United States Census Bureau, Newburg has a total area of 1.9 square miles (4.8 km^{2}), of which 0.008 square miles (0.02 km^{2}), or 0.47%, is water.

== Demographics ==
Historical population
| Census | Pop. | Note | %± |
|---|---|---|---|
| 1880 | 184 | | — |
| 1890 | 354 | | 92.4% |
| 1900 | 314 | | −11.3% |
| 1910 | 274 | | −12.7% |
| 1920 | 241 | | −12.0% |
| 1930 | 178 | | −26.1% |
| 1940 | 183 | | 2.8% |
| 1950 | 182 | | −0.5% |
| 1960 | 150 | | −17.6% |
| 1970 | 151 | | 0.7% |
| 1980 | 132 | | −12.6% |
| 1990 | 117 | | −11.4% |
| 2000 | 81 | | −30.8% |
| 2010 | 92 | | 13.6% |
| 2020 | 82 | | −10.9% |
| 2021 (est.) | 78 | | −4.9% |

As of the census of 2000, there were 81 people, 35 households, and 21 families residing in the borough. The population density was 47.0 inhabitants per square mile (18.1/km^{2}). There were 52 housing units at an average density of 30.2 per square mile (11.7/km^{2}). The racial makeup of the borough was 92.59% White, 2.47% African American, and 4.94% from two or more races. Hispanic or Latino people of any race were 2.47% of the population.

Of the 35 households, 22.9% had children under the age of 18 living with them, 42.9% were married couples living together, 14.3% had a female householder with no husband present, and 40.0% were non-families. Unrelated individuals composed 37.1% of all households, and 20.0% had someone living alone who was 65 years of age or older. The average household size was 2.31, and the average family size was 3.10.

The population of the borough was spread out, with 18.5% under the age of 18, 9.9% from 18 to 24, 33.3% from 25 to 44, 17.3% from 45 to 64, and 21.0% who were 65 years of age or older. The median age was 39 years. For every 100 females there were 107.7 males. For every 100 females age 18 and over, there were 106.3 males.

The median income for a household in the borough was $29,167, and the median income for a family was $36,250. Males had a median income of $38,750 versus $26,250 for females. The per capita income for the borough was $15,166. There were no families and 3.1% of the population living below the poverty line, including no under-eighteens and 20.0% of those over 64.

By the census of 2010, the population had increased to 92.

== Notable people ==
LaJose is the birthplace of pastor and author A. W. Tozer.
