= Hogback Bridge =

- U.S. National Register of Historic Places
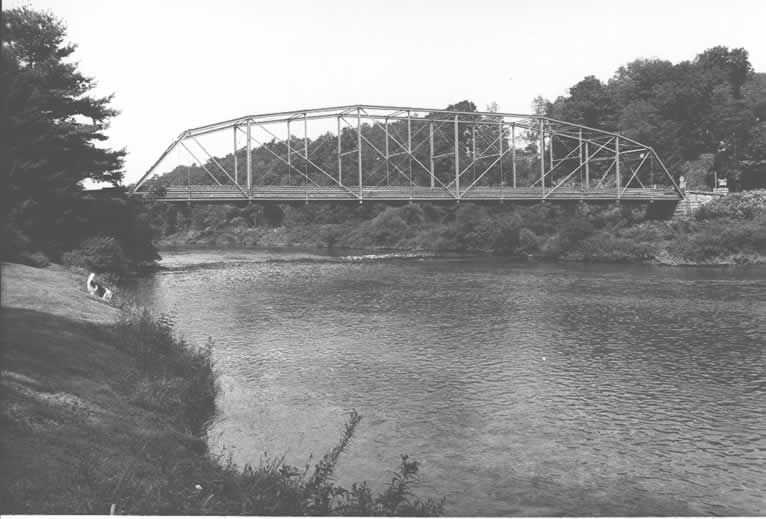
- Side of the Hogback Bridge

- Location within Pennsylvania Location within the United States
- Nearest city: Curwensville, Pennsylvania
- Coordinates: 40°58′25″N 78°29′26″W
- Built: 1893
- Architectural style: Pennsylvania Petit truss
- MPS: Highway Bridges Owned by the Commonwealth of Pennsylvania, Department of Transportation TR
- NRHP reference No.: 88000848
- Added to NRHP: June 22, 1988

Hogback Bridge was an historic Pennsylvania (Petit) truss bridge located in Curwensville, Clearfield County, Pennsylvania, United States. It was built over the West Branch Susquehanna River in 1893 by the King Bridge Company.

It was listed on the National Register of Historic Places in 1988. It is now torn down.

== See also ==
- National Register of Historic Places listings in Clearfield County, Pennsylvania
