= Bell Township, Clearfield County, Pennsylvania =

Township in Pennsylvania, US

Coordinates: 40°54′35″N 78°45′04″W

- Township
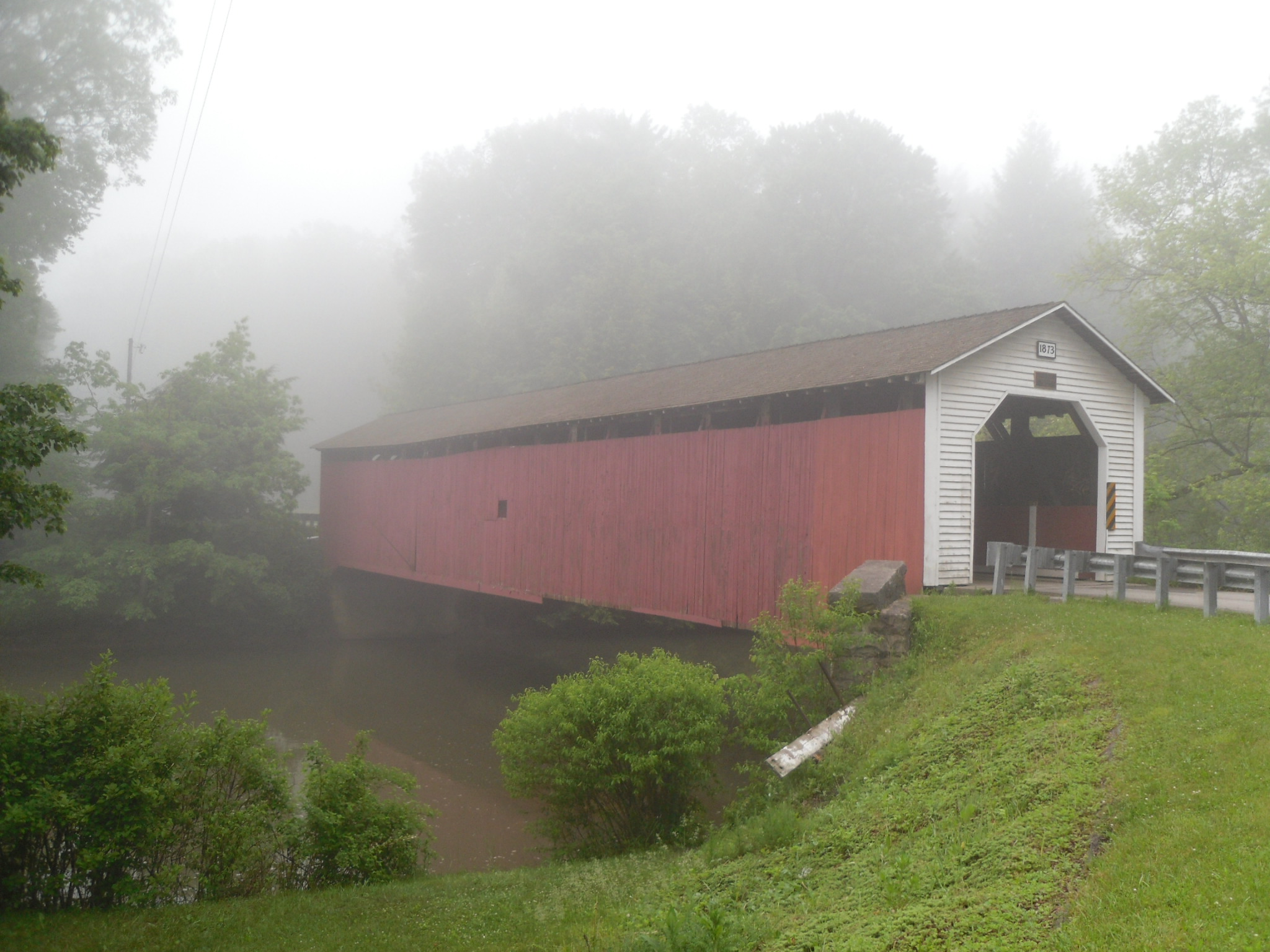
- McGees Mills Covered Bridge, the only covered bridge that crosses the West Branch Susquehanna River

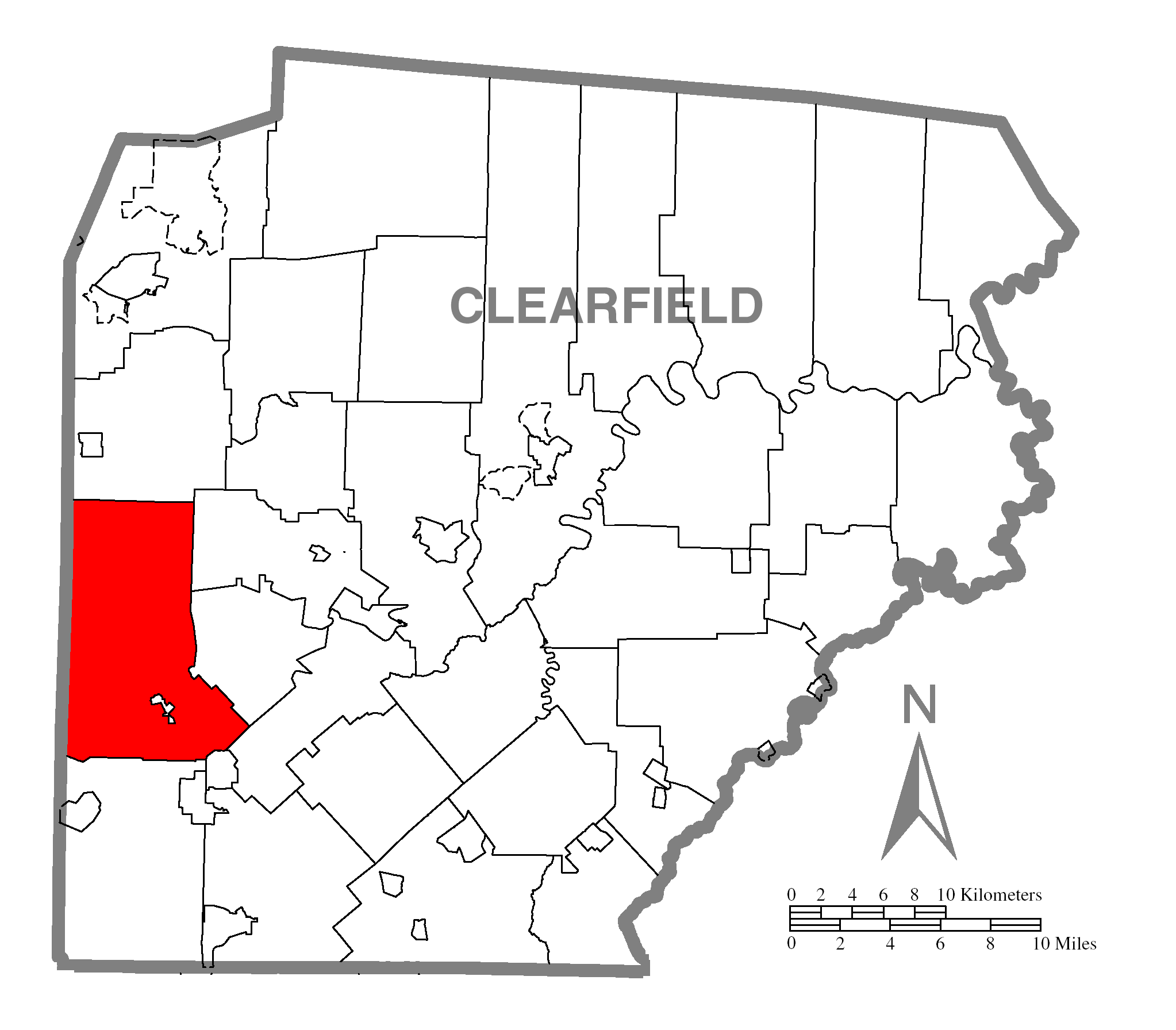
- Map of Clearfield County, Pennsylvania highlighting Bell Township

- Map of Clearfield County, Pennsylvania
- Country: United States
- State: Pennsylvania
- County: Clearfield
- Settled: 1820
- Incorporated: 1835

Area
  - Total: 56.93 sq mi (147.44 km^{2})
  - Land: 56.68 sq mi (146.80 km^{2})
  - Water: 0.24 sq mi (0.63 km^{2})

Population (2020)
  - Total: 686 ▼
  - Estimate (2022): 674 ▼
  - Density: 13.1/sq mi (5.05/km^{2})
- Time zone: UTC-5 (Eastern (EST))
  - Summer (DST): UTC-4 (EDT)
- Area code: 814
- FIPS code: 42-033-05192

Bell Township is a township in Clearfield County, Pennsylvania, United States. The population was 686 at the 2020 census.

== Geography ==
Bell Township is located in western Clearfield County and is bordered on the west by Jefferson and Indiana counties. The borough of Mahaffey is in the southeastern part of the township but is a separate municipality. According to the United States Census Bureau, the township has a total area of 56.9 square miles (147.4 km^{2}), of which 56.7 square miles (146.8 km^{2}) is land and 0.2 square miles (0.6 km^{2}), or 0.43%, is water. The West Branch Susquehanna River crosses the southern part of the township from southwest to east, passing through Mahaffey. Chest Creek enters the West Branch from the south at Mahaffey.

== Communities ==
- Bethlehem
- Clover Run
- McGees Mills (McGees Mills Covered Bridge)
- Middleton
- Newtonburg
- Ostend
- Ridge
- Rowles

== Demographics ==
Historical population
Census	Pop.	Note	%±
1970	601		—
1980	889		47.9%
1990	925		4.0%
2000	825		−10.8%
2010	760		−7.9%
2020	686		−9.7%
2022 (est.)	674		−1.7%
U.S. Decennial Census

As of the census of 2000, there were 825 people, 315 households, and 233 families residing in the township. The population density was 14.5 people per square mile (5.6/km^{2}). There were 452 housing units at an average density of 8.0/sq mi (3.1/km^{2}). The racial makeup of the township was 99.03% White, 0.24% Native American, 0.12% Asian, 0.12% from other races, and 0.48% from two or more races. Hispanic or Latino of any race were 0.24% of the population.

There were 315 households, out of which 32.7% had children under the age of 18 living with them, 64.8% were married couples living together, 4.8% had a female householder with no husband present, and 26.0% were non-families. 24.1% of all households were made up of individuals, and 12.1% had someone living alone who was 65 years of age or older. The average household size was 2.62 and the average family size was 3.08.

In the township the population was spread out, with 24.1% under the age of 18, 7.3% from 18 to 24, 26.8% from 25 to 44, 24.7% from 45 to 64, and 17.1% who were 65 years of age or older. The median age was 39 years. For every 100 females, there were 101.7 males. For every 100 females age 18 and over, there were 96.9 males.

The median income for a household in the township was US$24,779, and the median income for a family was $32,768. Males had a median income of $26,389 versus $20,694 for females. The per capita income for the township was $12,090. About 11.9% of families and 17.3% of the population were below the poverty line, including 22.6% of those under age 18 and 9.2% of those age 65 or over.

== Education ==
Bell Township is located within the Purchase Line School District.
