= Dimeling Hotel =

- U.S. National Register of Historic Places
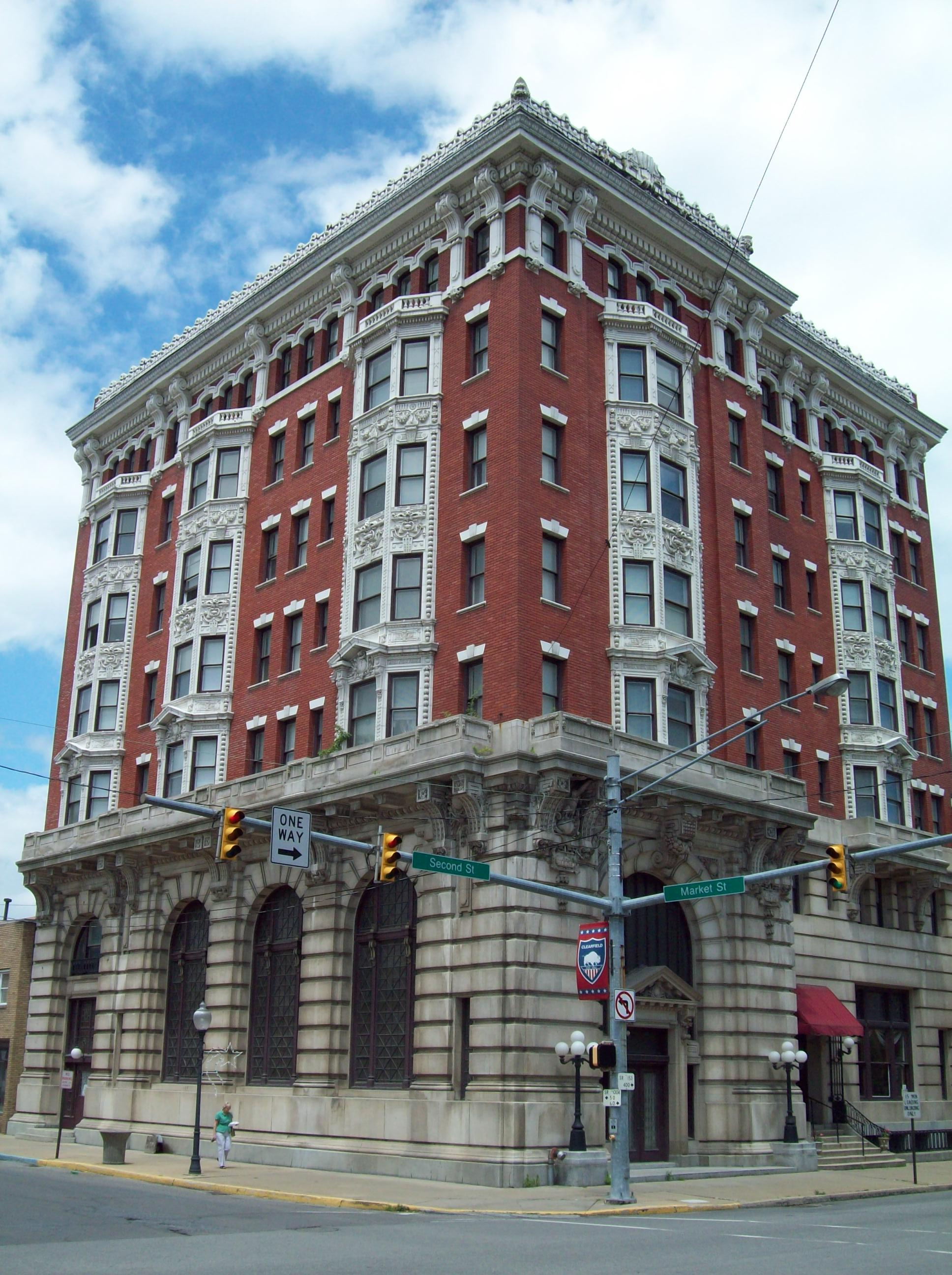
- Dimeling Hotel, June 2009

- Location within Pennsylvania Location within the United States
- Location: 2nd and Market Sts., Clearfield, Pennsylvania
- Coordinates: 41°1′20″N 78°26′19″W
- Built: 1904-1905
- Architect: Beezer Brothers
- Architectural style: Beaux Arts
- NRHP reference No.: 80003474
- Added to NRHP: April 10, 1980

Dimeling Hotel is a historic hotel located in Clearfield, Pennsylvania, United States. The seven-story, 120-room hotel, located across from the Clearfield County Courthouse, was designed by Louis Beezer and Michael J. Beezer of Beezer Brothers, a Pittsburgh-based architectural firm, and constructed in 1904–1905. The hotel ceased operating in 1977. The community came together to save this landmark, and in 1998 investors agreed to buy the building (for $1) and turn it into senior living apartments. Building rehab took nearly two years. Dimeling Senior Residence opened doors in 1999.

The building was listed on the National Register of Historic Places on April 10, 1980.

== See also ==
- National Register of Historic Places listings in Clearfield County, Pennsylvania
