= Irvin-Patchin House =

Historic house in Pennsylvania, United States

- U.S. National Register of Historic Places
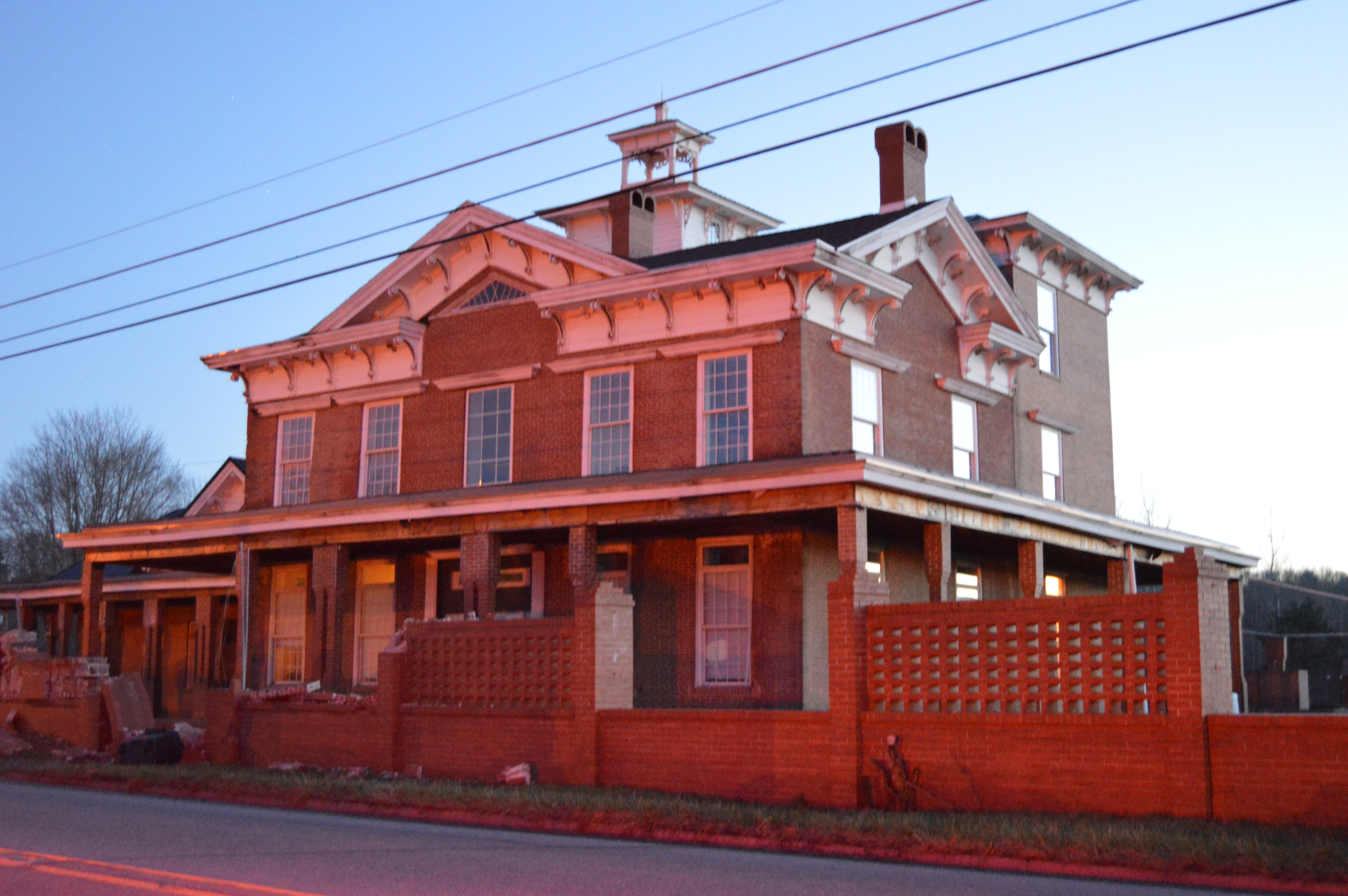
- Roadside view of the house

- Location within Pennsylvania Location within the United States
- Location: Main St., Burnside, Pennsylvania
- Coordinates: 40°48′58″N 78°47′19″W
- Built: 1850
- Architectural style: Italian Villa, Federal
- NRHP reference No.: 79002209
- Added to NRHP: June 19, 1979

Irvin-Patchin House is a historic home located in Burnside, Pennsylvania, United States. It is a 2 1/2-story brick dwelling, with 3-story brick addition, constructed initially in 1850. It was constructed by William Irvin, an early settler in western Clearfield County.

It was listed on the National Register of Historic Places in 1979.

== See also ==
- National Register of Historic Places listings in Clearfield County, Pennsylvania
