= Chinklacamoose =

Native American village in Pennsylvania

Chinklacamoose, spelled many ways, was an old Native American village located at what is now Clearfield, Pennsylvania. The village existed from the early 1st century until around the mid to late 17th century. The village was about halfway along the Great Shamokin Path, which started at the old Indian village of Shamokin (present day Sunbury), along the West Branch of the Susquehanna River west to its ending point at the village of Kittanning.

Chinklacamoose kept its name until 1804, when it became the first township for Clearfield County. Only three years later, the township began to split up into smaller townships, like Beccaria, Bradford, Lawrence and Pike by 1813, when Chinklacamoose Township no longer existed and the name was lost to history.

An historic marker depicting the old Indian village name, is located near State Route 879 about 2 1/2 miles south of Clearfield.
