= Purchase Line Junior/Senior High School =

Coordinates: 40.73557°N 78.91697°W

Location
- 16559 Route 286 Highway; Green Township, Pennsylvania 15729; United States

Information
- Established: 1954
- School district: Purchase Line School District
- Principal: Chad Cordeck
- Teaching staff: 32.96 (FTE)
- Grades: 7-12
- Student to teacher ratio: 11.44
- Colors: Red, Gray and White
- Team name: Red Dragons
- Website: highschool.plsd.k12.pa.us

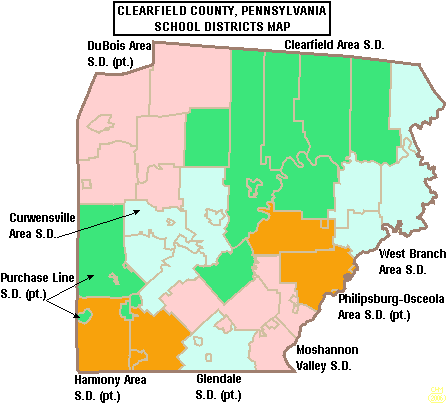
Purchase Line SD in Clearfield County

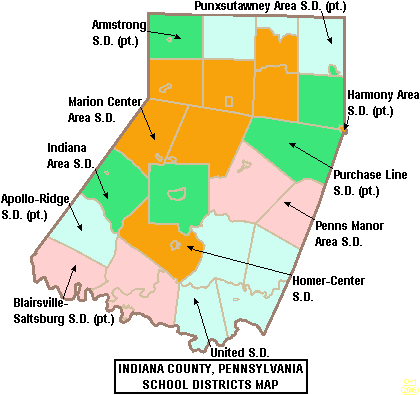
Purchase Line SD in Indiana County

Purchase Line High School, named for the boundary line set by William Penn in the late 1700s and the small village surrounding the school, was established in 1954 and serves students in northeast Indiana and southwest Clearfield counties.

== Vocational Education ==
Students in grades 10-12 have the opportunity to attend the Indiana County Technology Center in White Township for part of their school day if they wish to obtain training in a specific area that the ICTC offers.

== Extracurriculars ==
The Purchase Line School District offers a wide variety of clubs, activities and an extensive sports program.

=== Clubs ===
The following clubs are available at Purchase Line

- FBLA
- Newspaper / Yearbook
- Iron Club
- Foreign Language Club
- Music Club
- Student Council
- Fishing Club
- National Honor Society
- Varsity Club
- SADD
- Quiz Bowl
- Heritage Conference Academic Competitions

=== Athletics ===
Purchase Line is in PIAA District 6's Heritage Conference:

- Baseball - Class A
- Basketball - Class AA
- Cross Country - Class AA
- Football - Class A
- Softball - Class A
- Track and Field - Class AA
- Volleyball - Class A
- Competitive Cheerleading - Small Varsity

==== Junior High Athletics ====
Students in Grades 7-8 may participate in non-championship play in the following sports:

- Basketball
- Football
- Volleyball
- Cross Country
- Track and Field
- Softball
- Baseball

== Alumni ==
- Joe Pittman - politician
