= Thomas Murray House (Clearfield, Pennsylvania) =

Historic house in Pennsylvania, United States

- U.S. National Register of Historic Places
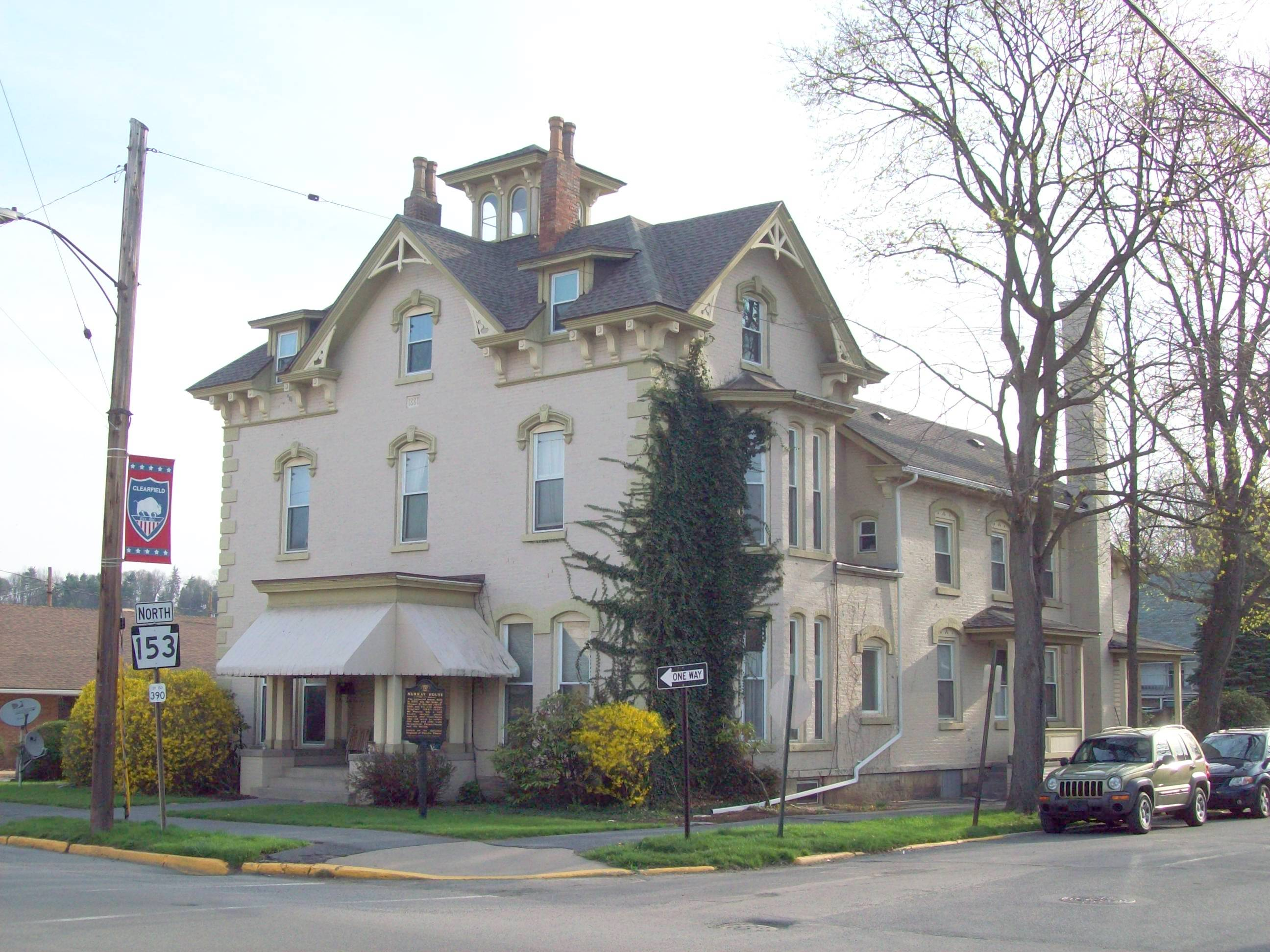
- Thomas Murray House, April 2010

- Location within Pennsylvania Location within the United States
- Location: 120 S. 2nd St, Clearfield, Pennsylvania
- Coordinates: 41°1′12″N 78°26′17″W
- Built: 1876
- Architectural style: Late Victorian, Italianate
- NRHP reference No.: 79002211
- Added to NRHP: October 25, 1979

Thomas Murray House is a historic home located in Clearfield, Pennsylvania, United States. It is a two-and-a-half-story brick dwelling in the Italianate style and constructed in 1876. It was constructed for Thomas Murray, a prominent attorney in late 19th-century Clearfield. The house was converted to apartments in 1943.

It was listed on the National Register of Historic Places in 1979.

== See also ==
- National Register of Historic Places listings in Clearfield County, Pennsylvania
