= St. Severin's Old Log Church =

Historic church in Pennsylvania, United States

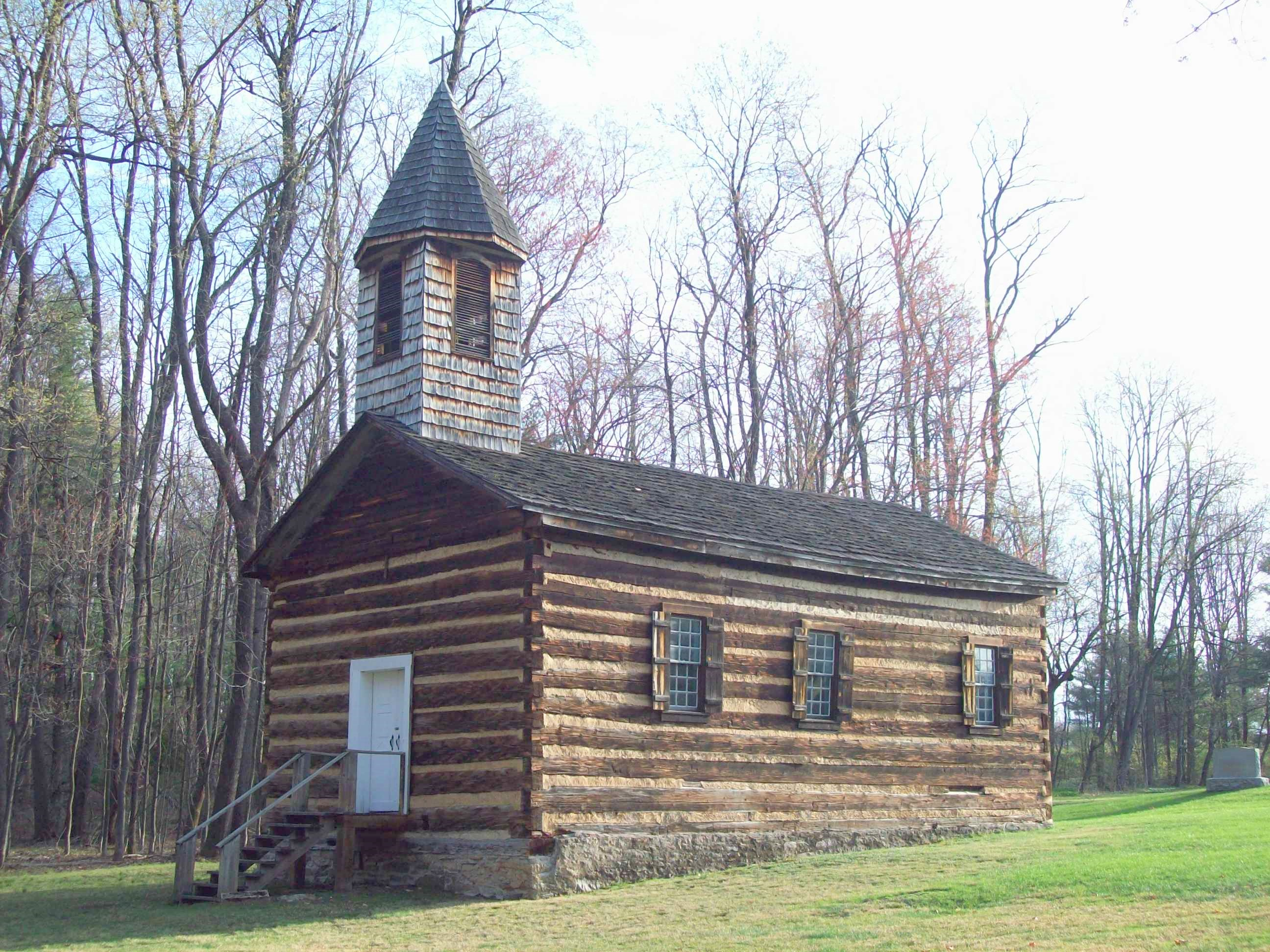

- Location within Pennsylvania Location within the United States

Religion
- Affiliation: Roman Catholic
- Ownership: Diocese of Erie
- Patron: Saint Severin of Bordeaux
- Year consecrated: 1851
- Status: Inactive

Location
- Location: Cooper Township, Clearfield County, Pennsylvania
- Country: United States
- Coordinates: 41°1′54.5″N 78°6′38″W

Architecture
- Style: Log cabin

Specifications
- Length: 45 ft (14 m)
- Width: 24 ft (7 m)
- U.S. National Register of Historic Places
- Designated: June 5, 1975
- Reference no.: 75001633

St. Severin's Old Log Church is a historic Roman Catholic church located in Cooper Township, Pennsylvania, United States within the Diocese of Erie.

== Description ==
The church was built by German settlers in about 1851 and served until about 1880. It is a 1 1/2-story log structure with a gable roof and steeple. The building measures approximately forty-five feet in length by twenty-four feet in width and rests upon a rock foundation.

It was listed on the National Register of Historic Places in 1975.

== See also ==
- National Register of Historic Places listings in Clearfield County, Pennsylvania
