= List of Pennsylvania state historical markers in Clearfield County =

Location of Clearfield County in Pennsylvania

This is a list of the Pennsylvania state historical markers in Clearfield County.

This is intended to be a complete list of the official state historical markers placed in Clearfield County, Pennsylvania by the Pennsylvania Historical and Museum Commission (PHMC). The locations of the historical markers, as well as the latitude and longitude coordinates as provided by the PHMC's database, are included below when available. There are 12 historical markers located in Clearfield County.

== Historical markers ==
Marker title	Image	Date dedicated	Location	Marker type	Topics
Canoe Place		June 18, 1946	US 219, .5 miles north of Stifflertown (MISSING)	Roadside	Native American, Transportation
A. W. Tozer (1897-1963)		July 25, 2007	1598 Mahaffey Grampian Highway (US 219), Mahaffey, near camp entrance 40.892555°N 78.721957°W	Roadside	Religion, Writers
Arnold N. Nawrocki (1925-2003)		July 18, 2007	424 State Street (PA 879), Curwensville	City	Business & Industry, Invention, Professions & Vocations
Big Spring, The (Pennsylvania)		December 29, 1950	3714 Shamokin Trail (PA 410), .5 mile southwest of Luthersburg; 41.05056°N 78.72498°W	Roadside	Military, Native American, Paths & Trails, Sports
Chinklacamoose		May 28, 1947	South 2nd Street and Clearfield-Shawville Highway (PA 879), Clearfield (Missing); 41.004649°N 78.455971°W	Roadside	Early Settlement, Government & Politics 18th Century, Native American
Clearfield County		September 17, 1982	County Historical Museum, East Pine Street & Front Street, Clearfield; 41.02446°N 78.43965°W	City	Government & Politics, Government & Politics 19th Century, Transportation
George Rosenkrans		September 15, 1984	Bennetts Valley Highway (PA 255) at Methodist Church, Penfield; 41.210400°N 78.571967°W	City	Music & Theater, Performers, Religion, Writers
Karthaus Furnace		March 2, 1948	1105 Market Street (PA 879), Karthaus; 41.12009°N 78.11807°W	Roadside	Business & Industry, Coal, Furnaces, Iron
Old State Road (Milesburg to Waterford)		February 8, 1955	Twenty-Eighth Division Highway (US 322) & Thunderbird Road, Sandy; 41.09024°N 78.80356°W	Roadside	Military, Paths & Trails, Roads, Transportation
Philip P. Bliss		May 27, 1947	Bennetts Valley Highway (PA 255) at Georgino Industrial Supply, Penfield; 41.24017°N 78.54666°W	Roadside	Agriculture, Business & Industry, Music & Theater, Performers, Religion, Writers
William Bigler (1814-1880)		October 13, 2004	PA 153 & Morris Street, Clearfield	City	Civil War, Government & Politics, Government & Politics 19th Century, Governors
Zenas Leonard (1809-1857)		August 24, 2005	Daisy Street (US 322) near Leonard Street at Park-n-Ride, Clearfield; 41.02065°N 78.41185°W	Roadside	Exploration

== See also ==
- List of Pennsylvania state historical markers
- National Register of Historic Places listings in Clearfield County, Pennsylvania
