= Knox Township, Clearfield County, Pennsylvania =

Township in Pennsylvania, US

Coordinates: 40°52′00″N 78°30′59″W

- Township
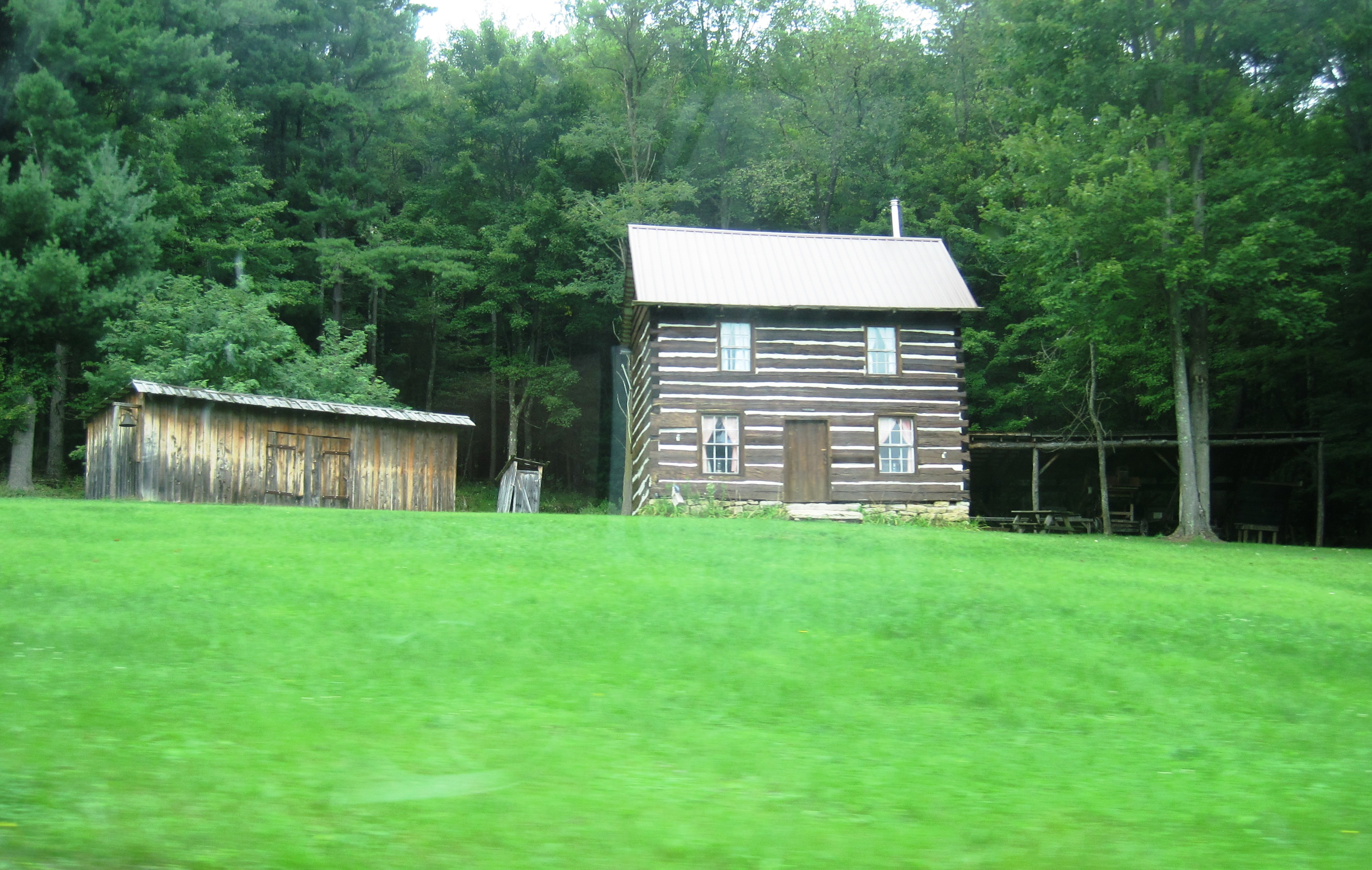
- Bloody Knox Log Cabin

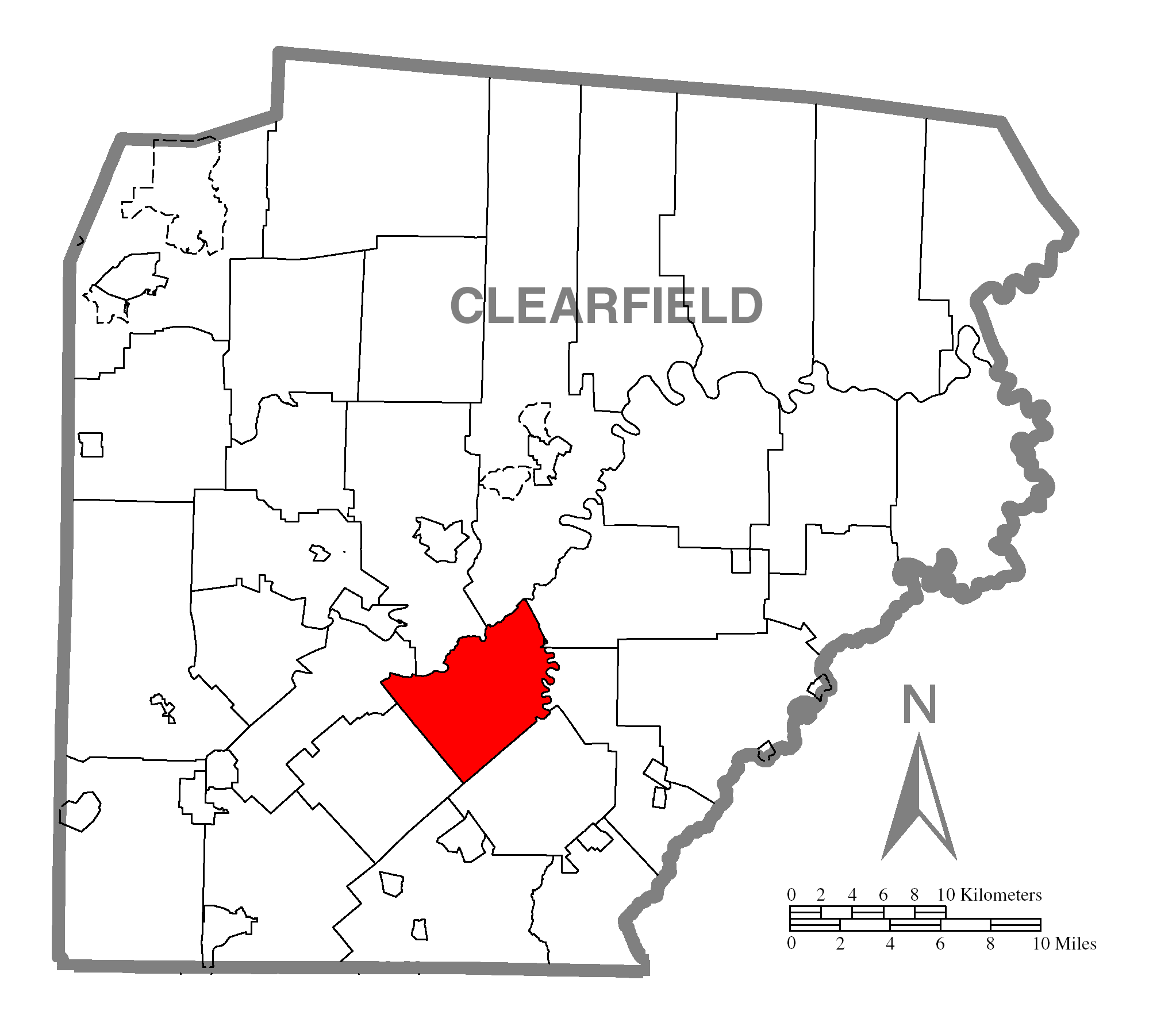
- Map of Clearfield County, Pennsylvania highlighting Knox Township

- Map of Clearfield County, Pennsylvania
- Country: United States
- State: Pennsylvania
- County: Clearfield
- Settled: 1806
- Incorporated: 1854

Area
  - Total: 25.98 sq mi (67.28 km^{2})
  - Land: 25.81 sq mi (66.84 km^{2})
  - Water: 0.17 sq mi (0.44 km^{2})

Population (2020)
  - Total: 599 ▼
  - Estimate (2021): 594
  - Density: 24.2/sq mi (9.35/km^{2})
- Time zone: UTC-5 (Eastern (EST))
  - Summer (DST): UTC-4 (EDT)
- Area code: 814
- FIPS code: 42-033-40296

Knox Township is a township that is located in Clearfield County, Pennsylvania, United States. As of the 2020 United States census, the population was 599.

== History ==
=== Bloody Knox ===
The township was also the site of the anti-civil war resistance known as Bloody Knox. There the log cabin home of Tom Adams was host to a shootout between draft deserters and anti-war residents. In the end, two men were killed and several arrested.

== Geography ==
According to the United States Census Bureau, the township has a total area of 25.3 square miles (66 km^{2}), all land.

== Communities ==
- Boardman
- Carnwath
- Erhard
- Kellytown
- New Millport
- O'Shanter
- Oak Ridge

== Demographics ==
Historical population
| Census | Pop. | Note | %± |
|---|---|---|---|
| 2000 | 705 | | — |
| 2010 | 647 | | −8.2% |
| 2020 | 599 | | −7.4% |
| 2021 (est.) | 594 | | −0.8% |
U.S. Decennial Census

As of the census of 2000, there were 705 people, 295 households, and 215 families residing in the township.

The population density was 27.9 inhabitants per square mile (10.8/km^{2}). There were 356 housing units at an average density of 14.1/sq mi (5.4/km^{2}).

The racial makeup of the township was 99.57% White, 0.14% Native American, and 0.28% from two or more races. Hispanic or Latino of any race were 0.14% of the population.

There were 295 households, out of which 28.1% had children under the age of eighteen living with them; 63.4% were married couples living together, 6.8% had a female householder with no husband present, and 27.1% were non-families. 24.4% of all households were made up of individuals, and 11.2% had someone living alone who was sixty-five years of age or older.

The average household size was 2.39 and the average family size was 2.80.

Within the township the, population was spread out, with 23.1% who were under the age of eighteen, 7.7% who were aged eighteen to twenty-four, 26.1% who were aged twenty-five to forty-four, 29.5% who were aged forty-five to sixty-four, and 13.6% who were sixty-five years of age or older. The median age was forty years.

For every one hundred females, there were 106.7 males. For every one hundred females who were aged eighteen or older, there were 106.9 males.

The median income for a household in the township was $26,583, and the median income for a family was $30,217. Males had a median income of $26,029 compared with that of $17,222 for females.

The per capita income for the township was $13,394.

Approximately 11.5% of families and 15.2% of the population were living below the poverty line, including 21.7% of those who were under the age of eighteen and 12.0% of those who were aged sixty-five or older.

== Education ==
Students in Knox Township attend schools in the Clearfield Area School District.
