= Clearfield County Courthouse =

Historic courthouse in Pennsylvania, US

- U.S. National Register of Historic Places
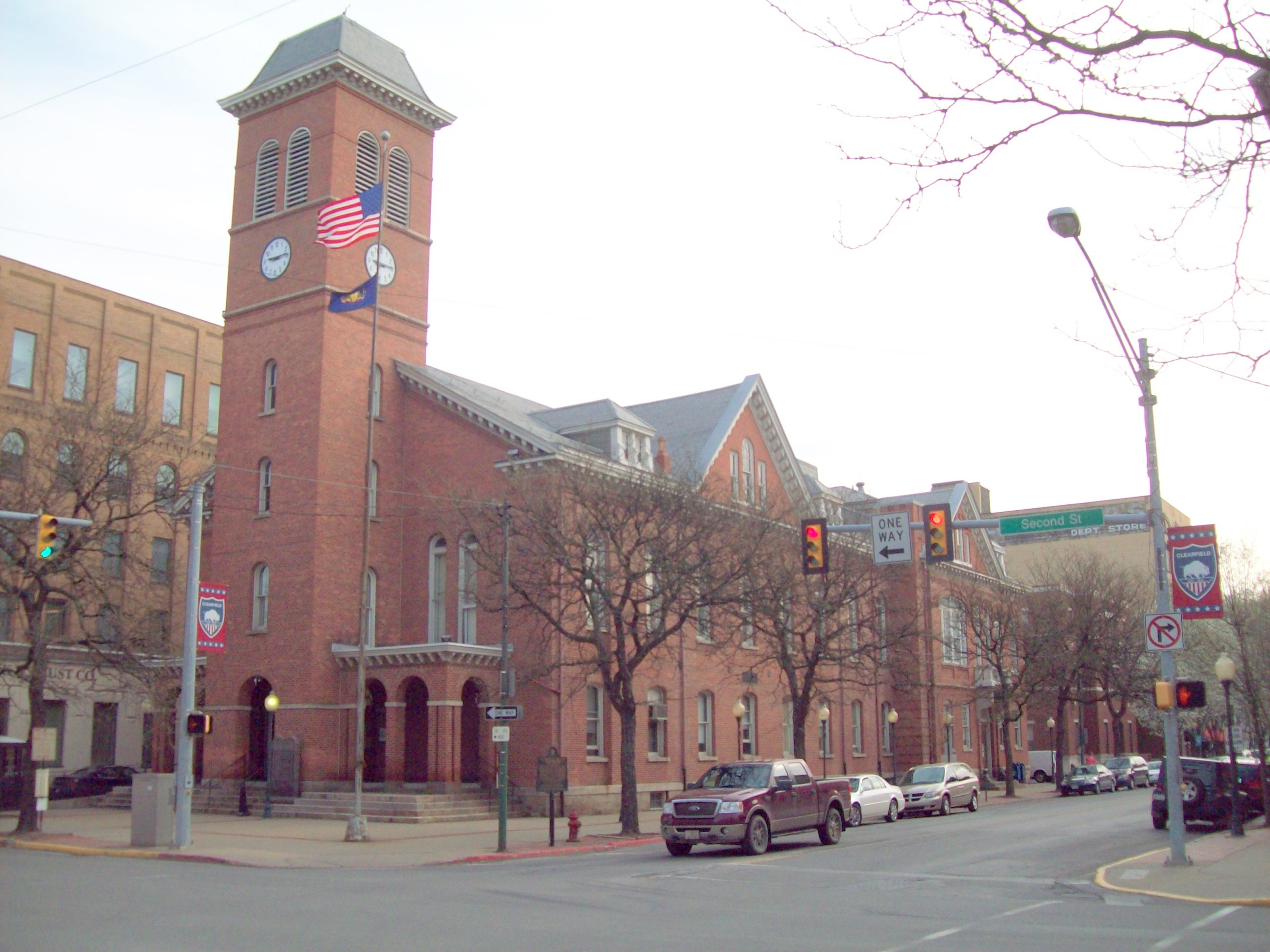
- Clearfield County Courthouse, April 2010

- Location within Pennsylvania Location within the United States
- Interactive map showing the location of Clearfield County Courthouse
- Location: 2nd and Market Sts., Clearfield, Pennsylvania
- Coordinates: 41°1′20″N 78°26′16″W
- Built: 1860
- Architect: Thorn, George
- Architectural style: Second Empire
- NRHP reference No.: 79002210
- Added to NRHP: April 27, 1979

Clearfield County Courthouse is a historic courthouse located in Clearfield, Pennsylvania, United States. It is located directly across from another historic landmark, the Dimeling Hotel. It is a 2 1/2-story brick structure constructed in 1860 in the Second Empire style. An addition was completed in 1884. It features a square brick clock tower with a bell shaped roof.

It was listed on the National Register of Historic Places in 1979.

== See also ==
- National Register of Historic Places listings in Clearfield County, Pennsylvania
- List of state and county courthouses in Pennsylvania
