= New Washington, Pennsylvania =

Borough in Pennsylvania, US

- Borough
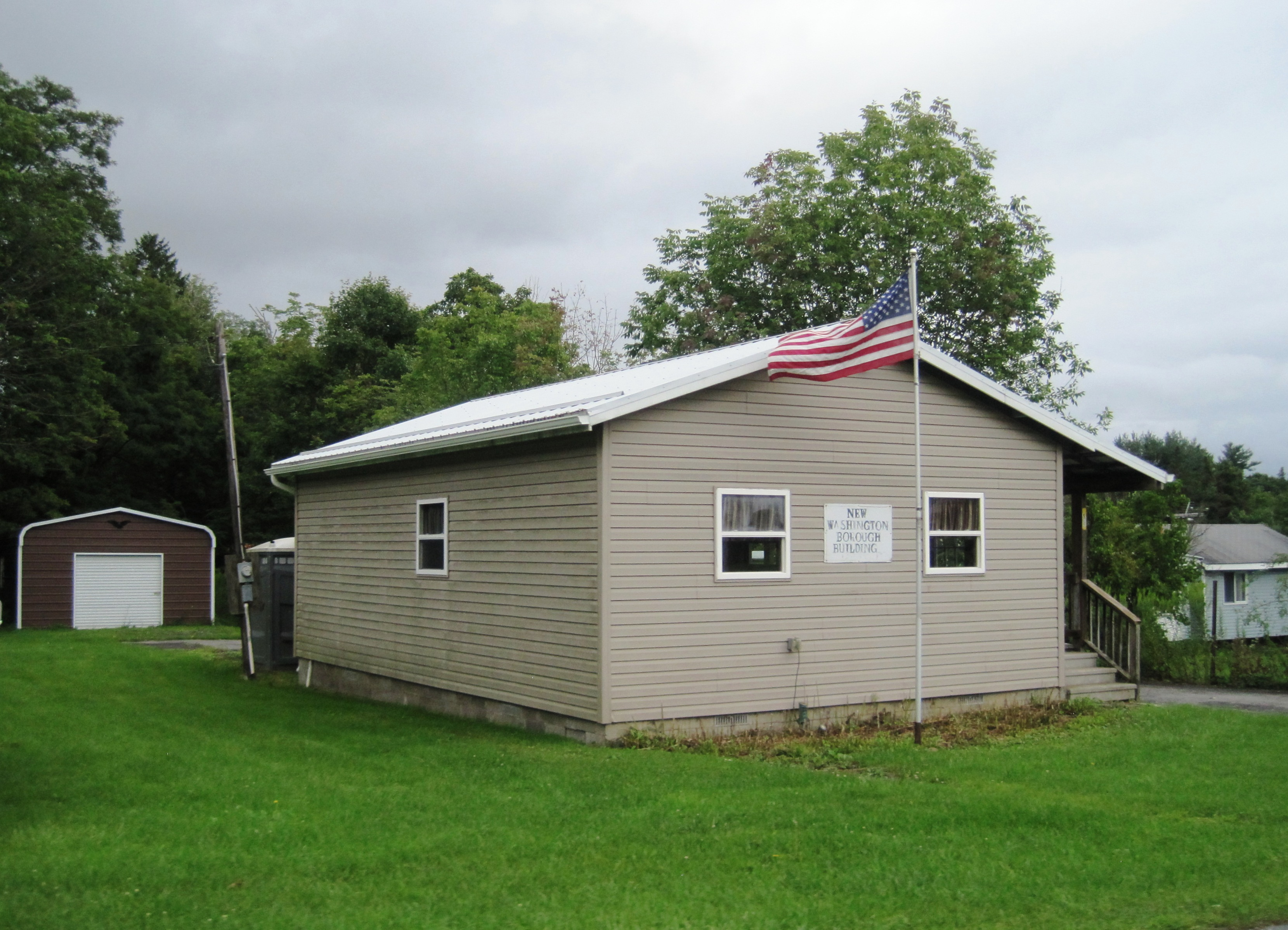
- Borough hall

- Location of New Washington in Clearfield County, Pennsylvania.

- Location of Clearfield County in Pennsylvania

- Location in Pennsylvania
- Coordinates: 40°49′22″N 78°42′04″W
- Country: United States
- State: Pennsylvania
- County: Clearfield
- Incorporated: 1859

Government
  - Type: Borough Council

Area
  - Total: 2.30 sq mi (5.95 km^{2})
  - Land: 2.29 sq mi (5.94 km^{2})
  - Water: 0.0039 sq mi (0.01 km^{2})
- Elevation: 1,669 ft (509 m)

Population (2020)
  - Total: 50
  - Density: 21.8/sq mi (8.42/km^{2})
- Time zone: UTC-5 (Eastern (EST))
  - Summer (DST): UTC-4 (EDT)
- ZIP code: 16048
- Area code: 814
- FIPS code: 42-54344

New Washington is a borough in Clearfield County, Pennsylvania, United States. The population was 50 at the 2020 census.

== Geography ==
New Washington is located in southwestern Clearfield County at 40°49′22″N 78°42′4″W (40.822783, -78.701112), on hills to the west of Chest Creek, a tributary of the West Branch Susquehanna River. It is bordered on the northeast by the borough of Newburg.

According to the United States Census Bureau, New Washington has a total area of 2.30 square miles (5.95 km^{2}), of which 0.004 square miles (0.01 km^{2}), or 0.19%, is water.

== Demographics ==
Historical population
Census	Pop.	Note	%±
1860	144		—
1870	211		46.5%
1880	280		32.7%
1890	178		−36.4%
1900	213		19.7%
1910	174		−18.3%
1920	122		−29.9%
1930	57		−53.3%
1940	60		5.3%
1950	65		8.3%
1960	55		−15.4%
1970	58		5.5%
1980	103		77.6%
1990	78		−24.3%
2000	89		14.1%
2010	59		−33.7%
2020	50		−15.3%
2021 (est.)	52	▲	4.0%

As of the census of 2000, there were 89 people, 30 households, and 26 families residing in the borough. The population density was 41.2 inhabitants per square mile (15.9/km^{2}). There were 43 housing units at an average density of 19.9 per square mile (7.7/km^{2}). The racial makeup of the borough was 97.75% White and 2.25% Asian.

There were 30 households, out of which 46.7% had children under the age of 18 living with them, 76.7% were married couples living together, 6.7% had a female householder with no husband present, and 13.3% were non-families. 13.3% of all households were made up of individuals, and 10.0% had someone living alone who was 65 years of age or older. The average household size was 2.97 and the average family size was 3.27.

In the borough the population was spread out, with 31.5% under the age of 18, 4.5% from 18 to 24, 30.3% from 25 to 44, 19.1% from 45 to 64, and 14.6% who were 65 years of age or older. The median age was 38 years. For every 100 females there were 117.1 males. For every 100 females age 18 and over, there were 103.3 males.

The median income for a household in the borough was $22,500, and the median income for a family was $26,250. Males had a median income of $26,563 versus $13,750 for females. The per capita income for the borough was $9,121. There were no families and 3.2% of the population living below the poverty line, including no under eighteens and 22.2% of those over 64.

== Notable person ==
- James W. Mott, U.S. Representative from Oregon from 1933-1945
