= Coalport Historic District =

Historic district in Pennsylvania, United States

- U.S. National Register of Historic Places
- U.S. Historic district
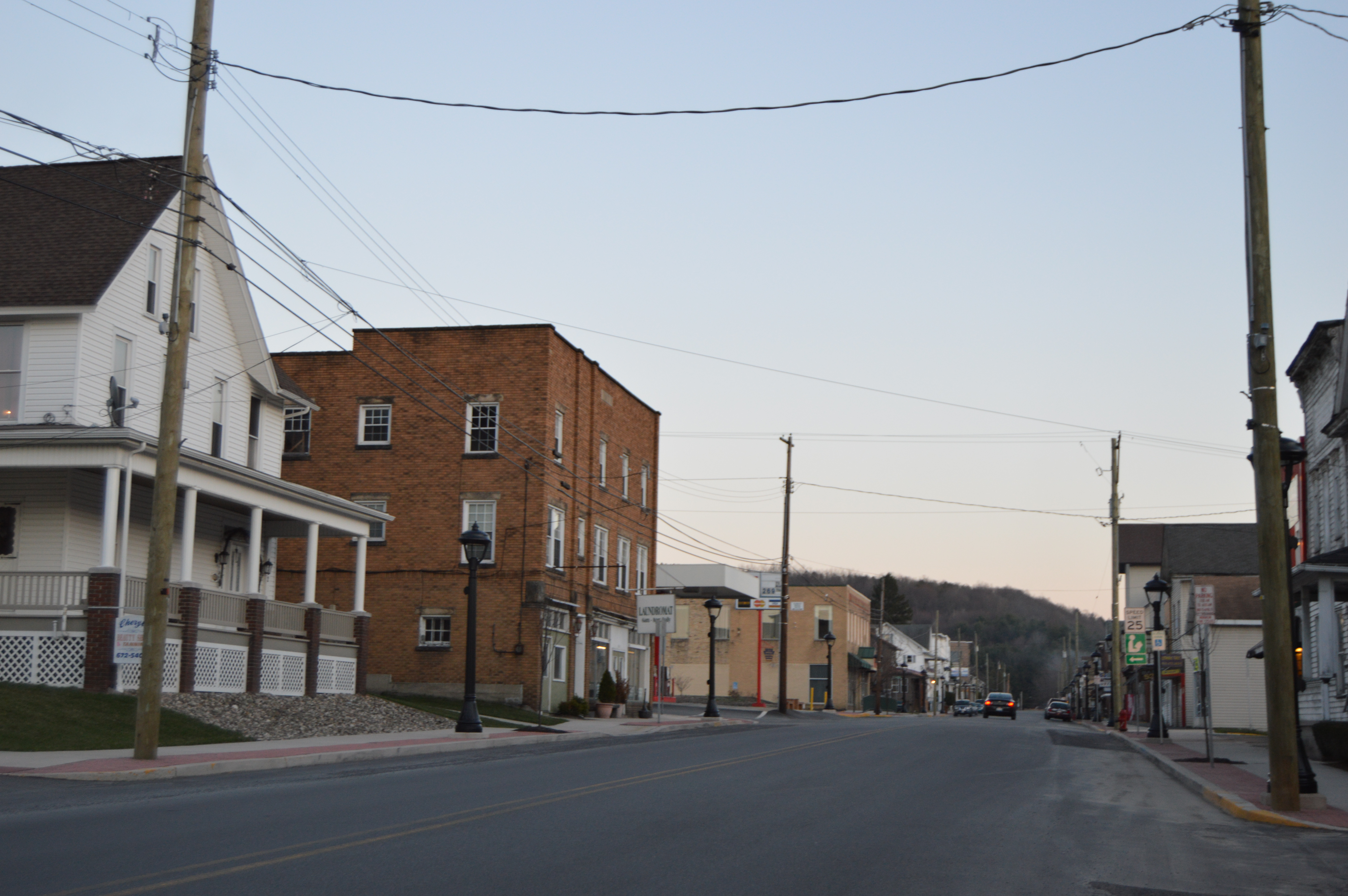
- Looking south on Main from Spruce

- Location within Pennsylvania Location within the United States
- Location: Along Main St., roughly form Mill to Walnut STs., Coalport, Pennsylvania
- Coordinates: 40°44′51″N 78°32′8″W
- Area: 15 acres (6.1 ha)
- Architectural style: Late Victorian, Late 19th And 20th Century Revivals
- NRHP reference No.: 99000517
- Added to NRHP: April 29, 1999

Coalport Historic District is a national historic district located at Coalport, Clearfield County, Pennsylvania. The district includes 41 contributing buildings in Coalport. The district is a mix of commercial and residential buildings, with half built between 1860 and 1890. Notable buildings include the United Methodist Church (1902), L.C. Hegarty and Son Used Cars (1941), Scott Hardware (1880), Bell's Drug Store (1884), Coalport 5&10 (1920), First National Bank (1922), Dixie Theater (1920), Central Hotel (1890), Hugh McNulty Hardware (1875), and V. Stevens Furniture Company (1875).

It was added to the National Register of Historic Places in 1999.
