= Simon B. Elliott State Park =

State park in Clearfield County, Pennsylvania

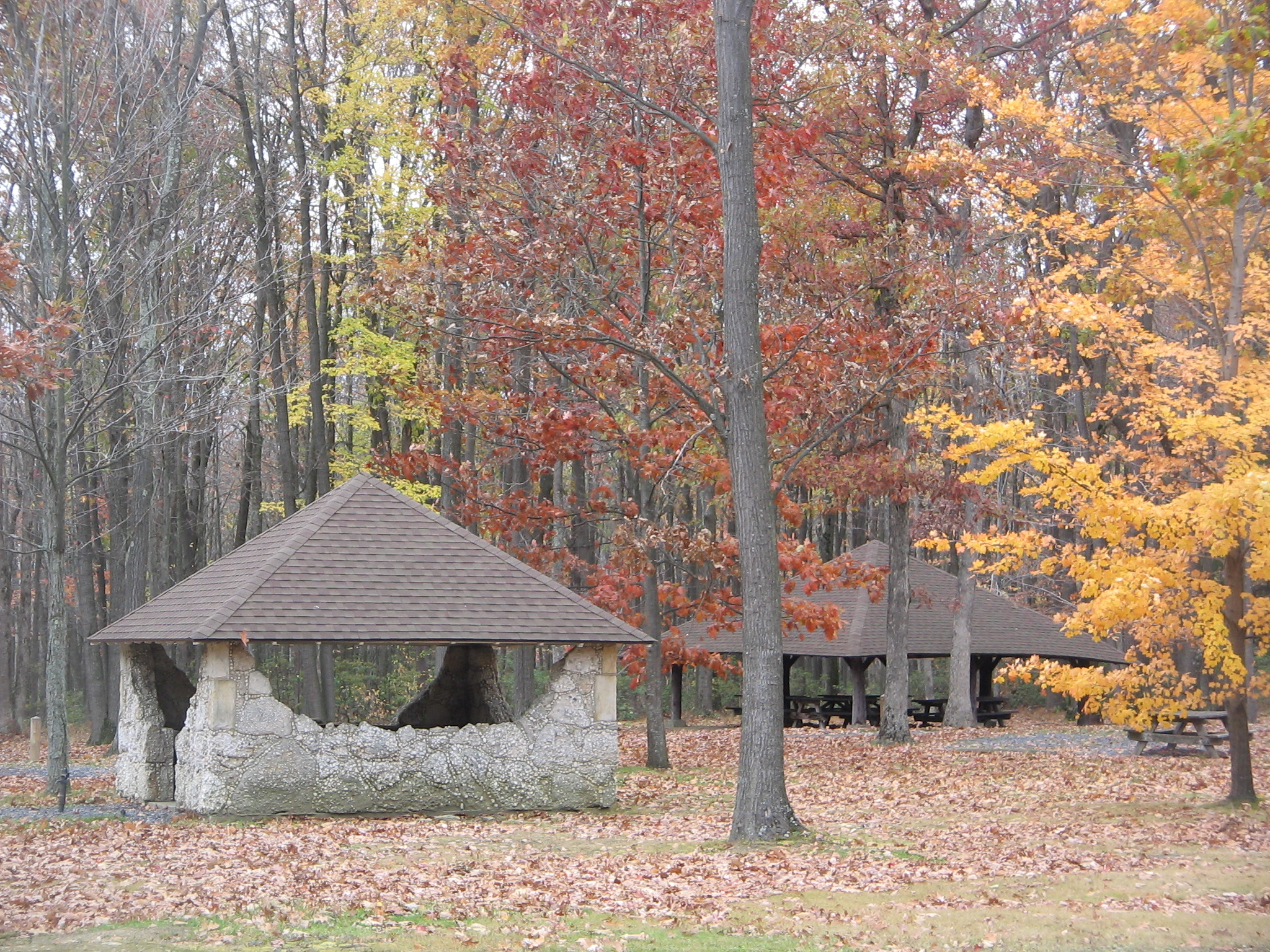
- CCC-built stone pumphouse and picnic pavilion

- Location within Pennsylvania Location within the United States
- Interactive map of Simon B. Elliott State Park
- Location: Pine Township, Clearfield County, Pennsylvania, United States
- Coordinates: 41°06′46″N 78°31′33″W
- Area: 318 acres (129 ha)
- Elevation: 2,119 feet (646 m)
- Established: 1933
- Administrator: Pennsylvania Department of Conservation and Natural Resources
- Website: Official website
- Pennsylvania State Parks

Simon B. Elliott State Park is a 318-acre (129 ha) Pennsylvania state park located in Pine Township, Clearfield County, Pennsylvania in the United States. The park is surrounded by Moshannon State Forest. The park is entirely wooded with second growth forests of mixed oak species, including northern red oak, chestnut oak, shagbark hickory, red maple, and tulip poplar, and northern hard woods, including sugar maple, black cherry, aspen, birch, hemlock, and ash. S. B. Elliott State park is 9 miles (14 km) north of Clearfield on Pennsylvania Route 153 just off exit 111 of Interstate 80.

== History ==
By the mid-19th century, the demand for lumber reached Clearfield County, where white pine and hemlock covered the mountainsides. Lumbermen came and harvested the trees. The Central Pennsylvania Lumber Company and Goodyear Lumber Company owned thousands of acres in Clearfield and surrounding counties. They built railroads and roads to harvest and distribute the timber. The lumber boom era was not to last, and soon all the trees were gone. Once the trees disappeared, the people were soon to follow. The lumbermen left behind a barren landscape that was devastated by erosion and wildfires. The Commonwealth of Pennsylvania bought the thousands of acres of deforested and burned land. The state began the massive project of reforesting the land. The forest has since recovered and is part of Moshannon State Forest.

The park is named for the Honorable Simon B. Elliott. He was a member of the Pennsylvania General Assembly, and a conservationist who promoted the idea of replanting the forests in order to limit erosion and fires.

The park was built in 1933 by the Civilian Conservation Corps. The young men of Camp S-116-PA built many of the cabins, roads, pavilions, and trails that exist at the park today. They also cleared brush, cleaned streams, built roads and bridges, and planted trees as part of a reforestation effort. The CCC also placed a plaque honoring Simon B. Elliott in the woods on the northern edge of the park.

== Recreation ==
Fishing at S. B. Elliott State Park is a popular recreational activity. There is a population of native and stocked trout in the small mountain streams of the park. They can only be accessed by hiking through the woods on one of the three miles (5 km) of hiking trails.

The CCC built several cabins and pavilions that are available for camping and picnicking. There is a 25 site rustic campground at S. B. Elliott State Park. There is a modern restroom near the camping area, but there are no showers.

Hunting is permitted on about 234 acres (95 ha) of S. B. Elliott State Park. Hunters are expected to follow the rules and regulations of the Pennsylvania State Game Commission. The common game species are ruffed grouse, eastern gray squirrel, wild turkey, white-tailed deer, and common pheasant. Many more acres of forested woodlands are available for hunting on the grounds of the adjacent Moshannon State Forest.

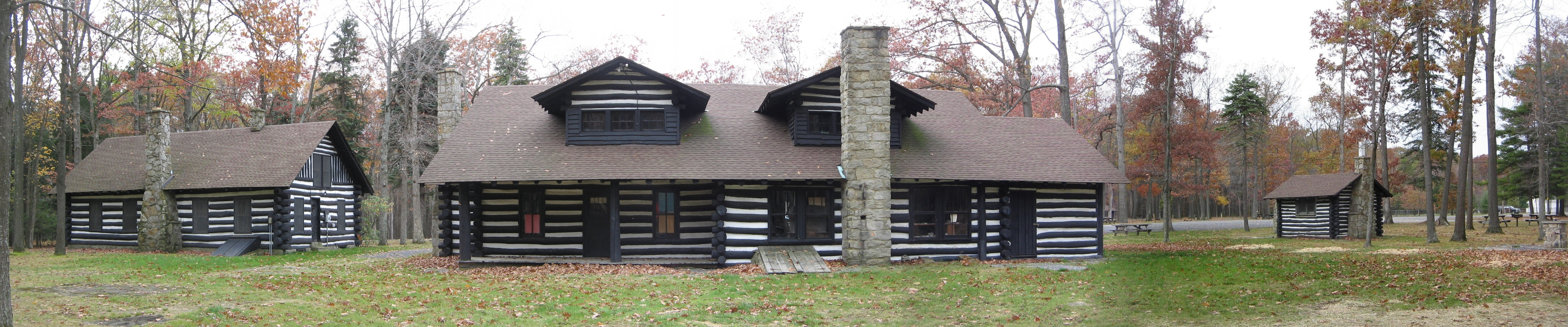
Rear view of the CCC-built Headquarters (left), Lodge (center), and Tool Shed (converted log cabin, right) at S.B. Elliott State Park. These structures are all listed on the National Register of Historic Places.
