= Joseph F. and Anna B. Schrot Farm =

- U.S. National Register of Historic Places
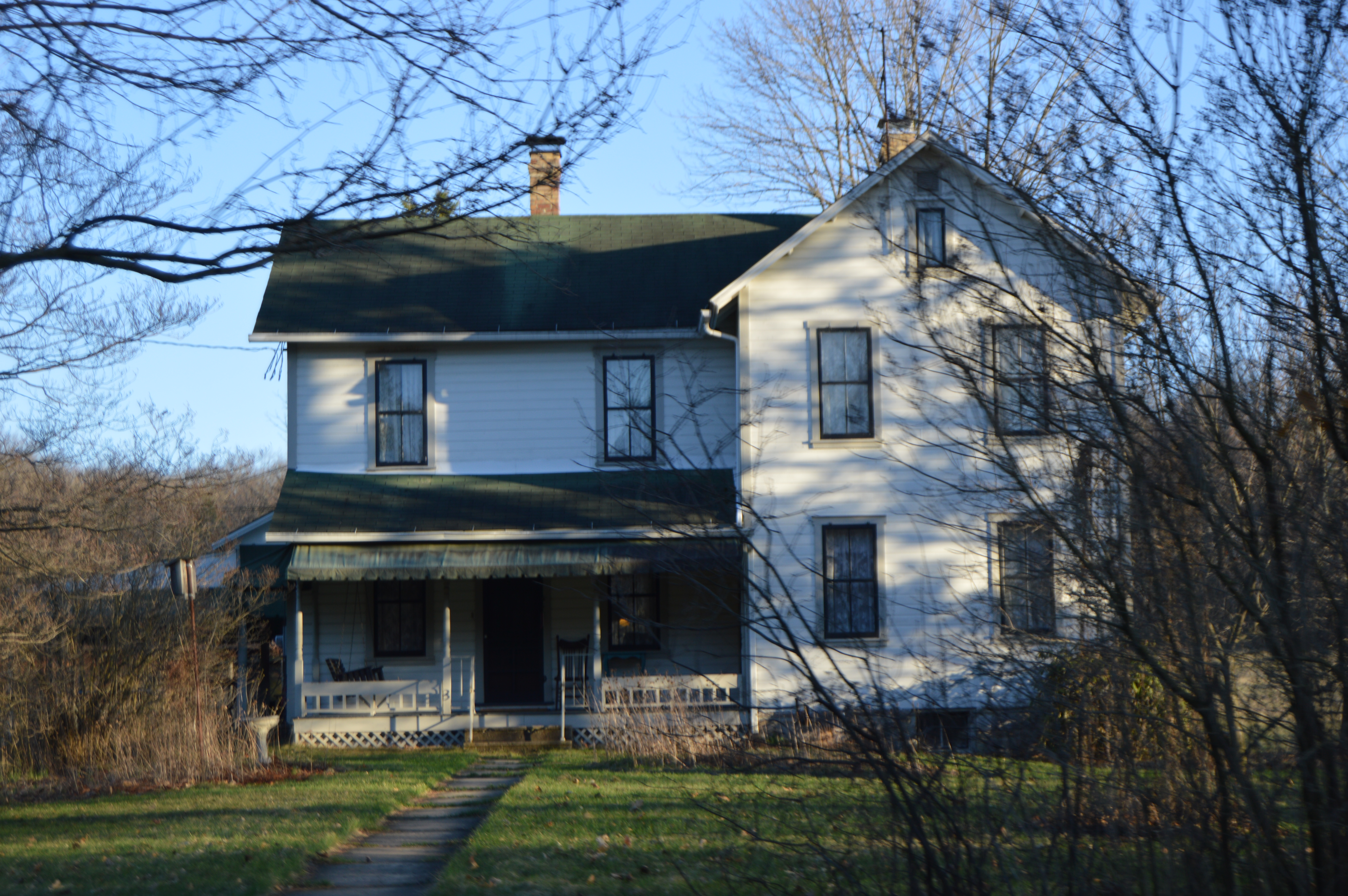
- Front, seen from the road

- Location within Pennsylvania Location within the United States
- Location: 880 Carbon Mine Road, Lawrence Township, Clearfield County, Pennsylvania
- Coordinates: 40°58′57″N 78°29′13″W
- Built: 1889
- NRHP reference No.: 11000643
- Added to NRHP: September 8, 2011

The Joseph F. and Anna B. Schrot Farm is a 17-acre (6.9 ha) subsistence farm located at 880 Carbon Mine Road in Lawrence Township, Clearfield County, Pennsylvania. The farm was established in 1889 by Joseph F. and Anna B. Schrot, a stonemason and his wife who immigrated to Clearfield County from Austria in 1883. Stone quarries at nearby Curwensville had created a local demand for masons, and Joseph Schrot was one of many Europeans who came to Clearfield County to take construction work. The Schrots' farm provided food for the couple and their family of fourteen children; the couple sold their excess food for additional income.

The farm was added to the National Register of Historic Places on September 8, 2011.

== Farm ==
Five contributing buildings still stand on the farm. The oldest remaining building, the 1889 woodshed, is a 15-by-10-foot (4.6 by 3.0 m) wood and stone structure. The farmhouse is a wood frame building constructed from 1891 to 1915 and features a gabled front and a side wing. The farm also includes a barn built in 1900, a chicken coop built in 1908, and a pigpen built in 1909. The farm's landscape also contributes to the historic value of the site and includes an orchard, vegetable gardens, a blueberry patch, a wood lot, and hay fields.
