= A. W. Tozer =

American pastor and author

Aiden Wilson Tozer
- Born: April 21, 1897; La Jose (now Newburg), Pennsylvania, U.S.
- Died: May 12, 1963 (aged 66); Toronto, Ontario, Canada
- Occupations: Pastor; author
- Spouse: Ada Cecelia Pfautz
- Children: 7

Aiden Wilson Tozer (April 21, 1897 – May 12, 1963) was an American Christian pastor, author, magazine editor, and spiritual mentor. For his accomplishments, he received honorary doctorates from Wheaton and Houghton colleges.

== Early life ==
Tozer hailed from the tiny farming community of La Jose in Western Pennsylvania. He was converted to Christianity as a teenager in Akron, Ohio: While on his way home from work at a tire company, he overheard a street preacher say, "If you don't know how to be saved ... just call on God, saying, 'Lord, be merciful to me a sinner.'" Upon returning home, he climbed into the attic and heeded the preacher's advice.

== Pastorate ==
In 1919, five years after his conversion and without formal education in Christian theology, Tozer accepted an offer to serve as pastor of his first church. That began 44 years of ministry associated with the Christian and Missionary Alliance (C&MA), an Evangelical Protestant denomination, 33 of those years serving as a pastor in several different congregations. His first congregation was a small storefront church in Nutter Fort, West Virginia. Later, he served thirty years (1928 to 1959) as the pastor of Southside Alliance Church in Chicago; the final years of his life he spent as pastor of Avenue Road Church in Toronto, Ontario, Canada. Observing contemporary Christian living, Tozer felt that the church was on a dangerous course toward compromising with "worldly" concerns.

Born into poverty, Tozer was self-educated and taught himself what he missed in high school and university.

== Authorship ==
Tozer began writing in 1931 for the denominational magazine of the Christian and Missionary Alliance, Alliance Weekly (now Alliance Life), which became the platform from which his writing career emerged. He later wrote the monthly column “There's Truth in It” (1936–37) and “A Word in Season” (1944–46). In May 1950, he became the editor of the Alliance Weekly, a position he filled until his death in 1963.

At the urging of David W. Fant, publications secretary of the C&MA, Tozer wrote biographies of A. B. Simpson (1943) and Robert A. Jaffray (1947). It was the publication of Tozer's third book, The Pursuit of God (1948), that made him a household name among evangelicals. In addition to the 12 books he published in his lifetime, more than 40 other books have been compiled from his magazine features, editorials, and transcribed sermons.

During his lifetime, Tozer's works were published by Christian Publications, Inc., the denominational press operated by the C&MA. The publishing house declared bankruptcy in 2006 and was purchased by WingSpread Publishers of Camp Hill, Pennsylvania. In November 2013, Moody Publishers acquired Wingspread from parent company Zur Ltd., a transaction that included more than 60 Tozer books and pamphlets. Some of Tozer's works are now in the public domain and have been issued by multiple publishers.

=== Theology ===
In general, Tozer did not wish to be associated with any particular theological category. For example, concerning divine providence and soteriology, he claimed to occupy a sort of middle ground between Arminianism and Calvinism. However, his views, particularly regarding the compatibility of God's sovereignty with libertarian free will, are generally regarded as aligned with Arminianism. For this reason, he is frequently cited as an Arminian reference by various sources. He is also appreciated in Wesleyan circles, especially within the Holiness Movement, for his views on sanctification.

== Personal life ==
Tozer had seven children, six sons and a daughter. Living a simple and non-materialistic lifestyle, he and his wife, Ada Cecelia Pfautz, never owned a car, as he preferred bus and train travel. Even after becoming a well-known Christian author, Tozer signed away much of his royalties to those who were in need.

Tozer's work, however, led him to neglect his family. His biographer, James L. Snyder, notes,

The scope of Tozer's ministry militated against a wholesome family life. Speaking engagements meant that he was away more than he was home. When he was actually in the house, he was in his bedroom study reading or writing.

== Death and legacy ==
Tozer died on May 13, 1963, in Toronto, Ontario, Canada, after suffering a heart attack. He was buried in Chicago, and later the family had his remains reinterred at Ellet Cemetery, Akron, Ohio. A simple marker reads: A. W. Tozer—A Man of God. The Alliance Weekly ran a memorial issue with numerous tributes and excerpts. The same issue also featured “God's Greatest Gift to Man", a transcription of his final sermon. A few months prior to his death, Tozer had submitted the manuscript for The Christian Book of Mystical Verse, which was released in 1964 as his final book. His official publisher, Christian Publications, released many titles after his death, based on his magazine articles and sermon transcriptions. These continue in print with Moody Publishers. Several other publishers have released his public-domain works.

In 2000, The Pursuit of God was named to Christianity Today's list of 100 “Books of the Century.” In 2006, Knowledge of the Holy was named in “The Top 50 Books That Have Shaped Evangelicals”. Contemporary Christian music artist Lauren Barlow of BarlowGirl later published a compilation of stories told by 59 artists, writers, and leaders about A.W. Tozer's personal inspiration.

== Published works ==
Books written or compiled by A. W. Tozer during his lifetime:

- Paths to Power (1940)
- Wingspread: A. B. Simpson: A Study in Spiritual Altitude (1943)
- Let My People Go: The Life of Robert A. Jaffray (1947)
- The Pursuit of God (1948)
- The Divine Conquest (1950)
- The Purpose of Man (1951) – First version
- How to be Filled with the Holy Spirit (1952)
- The Crucified Life (1953) – First version
- The Root of the Righteous (1955)
- Keys to the Deeper Life (1957)
- Born after Midnight (1959)
- Of God And Men (1960)
- The Knowledge of the Holy (1961)
- Christian Book of Mystical Verse (1963)

Booklets, undated:

- The Praying Plumber Of Lisburn: A Sketch of God's Dealings with Thomas Haire
- Total Commitment to Christ: What is It?
- The Menace of the Religious Movie
- Five Vows of Spiritual Power

Compilations published after his death:

- That Incredible Christian (1964)
- Man: The Dwelling Place of God (1966)
- When He is Come (1968) ISBN 0-87509-221-7
- I Call It Heresy! (1974) ISBN 0-87509-209-8
- Who Put Jesus on the Cross? (1975) 0-87509-212-8
- Gems from Tozer (1979) ISBN 0-87509-163-6
- Renewed Day by Day: Daily Devotional (1980) ISBN 0-87509-292-6
- A Treasury of A. W. Tozer (1980) ISBN 0-8010-8851-8
- Echoes from Eden: The Voices of God Calling Man (1981) ISBN 0-87509-227-6; originally published as The Tozer Pulpit Vol. 8: Ten Sermons on the Voices of God Calling Man
- Leaning Into The Wind (1985) STL Books, Bromley, Kent ISBN 0-903843-98-6
- Whatever Happened to Worship? (1985)
- Faith Beyond Reason (1987) OM Publishing, Bromley, Kent ISBN 1-85078-025-0
- Jesus, Our Man in Glory (1987) ISBN 0-87509-390-6
- Jesus, Author of Our Faith (1988) ISBN 0-87509-406-6
- Men Who Met God (1989) OM Publishing, Bromley, Kent ISBN 1-85078-058-7
- That Incredible Christian (1989) OM Publishing, Bromley, Kent ISBN 1-85078-064-1
- This World: Playground or Battleground?: A Call to the Real World of the Spiritual (1989) ISBN 978-0-8024-1843-2
- I Talk Back to the Devil: Essays in Spiritual Perfection (1990) ISBN 0-87509-437-6
- The Coming King (1990) STL Books, Bromley, Kent ISBN 1-85078-074-9
- Christ the Eternal Son (1991) ISBN 978-1-60066-047-4
- The Best of A. W. Tozer: 52 Favourite Chapters Compiled by Warren W. Wiersbe (1991), Crossway Books ISBN 1-85684-007-7
- God Tells the Man Who Cares (1992) ISBN 0-87509-508-9
- We Travel an Appointed Way (1992) OM Publishing, Bromley, Kent ISBN 1-85078-116-8
- Out of the Rut, Into Revival (1992) ISBN 978-0-340-72235-0
- The Attributes of God, Volume One, with study guide by David E. Fessenden (1997) ISBN 0-87509-957-2
- The Attributes of God, Volume Two, with study guide by David E. Fessenden (2001) ISBN 0-87509-988-2
- The Best of A. W. Tozer, Book 1 (1979) ISBN 0-87509-458-9
- The Best of A. W. Tozer, Book 2 (1995) ISBN 0-87509-594-1
- The Tozer Topical Reader (1999) ISBN 0-87509-838-X
- The Radical Cross (2005) ISBN 0-88965-236-8
- The Worship-Driven Life: The Reason We Were Created (2008) ISBN 1-85424-877-4
- Signposts: A Collection of Sayings from A.W. Tozer ISBN 0-89693-583-3
- Tozer on the Almighty God: A 366-Day Devotional ISBN 0-87509-972-6
- Faith Beyond Reason ISBN 1-60066-033-9
- Warfare Of The Spirit ISBN 1-60066-059-2
- The Pursuit Of God With Study Guide ISBN 1-60066-106-8
- The Purpose of Man: Designed to Worship (2009) Regal Books, Ventura, CA ISBN 978-0-8307-4689-7
- Reclaiming Christianity: A Call to Authentic Faith (2009) Regal Books, Ventura, CA ISBN 978-0-8307-4690-3
- And He Dwelt Among Us: Teachings from the Gospel of John (2009) Regal Books, Ventura, CA ISBN 978-0-8307-4691-0
- Living As a Christian: Teachings from First Peter (2010) Regal Books, Ventura, CA ISBN 978-0-8307-4692-7
- Experiencing the Presence of God: Teachings from the Book of Hebrews (2010) Regal Books, Ventura, CA ISBN 978-0-8307-4693-4
- A Disruptive Faith: Expect God to Interrupt Your Life (2011) Regal Books, Ventura, CA ISBN 978-0-8307-5761-9
- The Crucified Life: How to Live Out a Deeper Christian Experience (2011) Regal Books, Ventura, CA ISBN 978-0-8307-5922-4
- The Dangers of a Shallow Faith: Awakening from Spiritual Lethargy (2012) Regal Books, Ventura, CA ISBN 978-0-8307-6204-0
- Preparing for Jesus' Return: Daily Live the Blessed Hope (2012) Regal Books, Ventura, CA ISBN 978-0-8307-6395-5
- God's Power for Your Life: How the Holy Spirit Transforms You Through God's Word (2013) Regal Books, Ventura, CA ISBN 978-0-8307-6537-9
- Keys to The Deeper Life (1984) Clarion Classics, published by Zondervan Publishing House, Grand Rapids, MI ISBN 0-310-33361-X
- God Still Speaks (2014) CrossReach Publications
- My Daily Pursuit: Devotions For Every Day (2013) Compiled and edited by James L Snyder – Bethany House
- Approaching the Almighty:100 Prayers of A.W. Tozer (2021) Compiled and edited by Philip R. Shappard - Moody Publishers
- Toward a More Perfect Faith: 4 Stages in Your Pursuit of God (2023) Compiled and edited by Philip R. Shappard - Moody Publishers

== Bibliography ==
A Passion for God: The Spiritual Journey of A. W. Tozer

- Author: Lyle Dorsett
- Published: 2008
- Publisher: Moody
- ISBN 978-0802481337

The Life of A.W. Tozer: In Pursuit of God

- Author: James L. Snyder
- Published: 2009
- Publisher: Bethany House
- ISBN 978-0764215919

A.W. Tozer: A Twentieth-Century Prophet

- Author: David J. Fant Jr.
- Published: 2010
- Publisher: Wingspread
- ISBN 978-1600660016

== Sources ==
- Lyle Dorsett, A Passion for God: The Spiritual Journey of A. W. Tozer (Chicago: Moody Publishers, 2008).
- James L. Snyder, In Pursuit of God: The Life of A. W. Tozer (Bloomington, MN: Bethany House Publishers, 2009).
- David J. Fant, A. W. Tozer: A Twentieth Century Prophet (Chicago: Moody Publishers, 1964).
- Elwell, Walter A. (2001). Evangelical Dictionary of Theology. Grand Rapids, MI: Baker Academic. ISBN 978-0-8010-2075-9.
- Fant, David J. Jr. (2010). A. W. Tozer: A Twentieth Century Prophet. Chicago, IL: WingSpread Publications.
- Hummel, Patti M. (2005). Standing Firm : 365 Devotions to Strengthen Your Faith. Nashville, TN: J. Countryman.
- Olson, Roger E. (2004). The Westminster handbook to evangelical theology. Louisville, KY: Westminster John Knox Press.
- Tozer, A. W. (2007). The Attributes of God Volume 2: Deeper Into the Father's Heart. Chicago, IL: Moody Publishers.
