= McGees Mills Covered Bridge =

- U.S. National Register of Historic Places
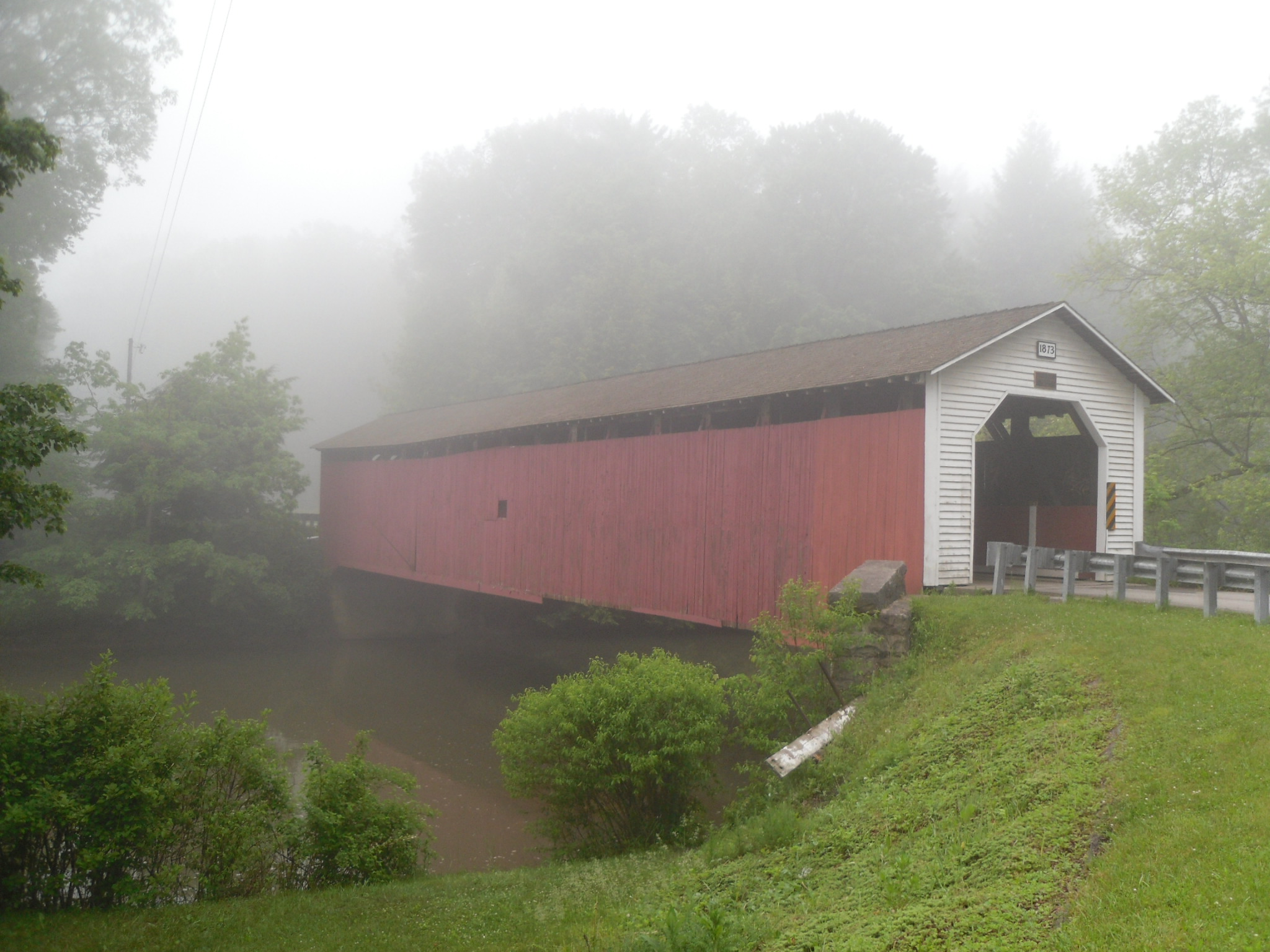
- McGees Mills Covered Bridge

- Location within Pennsylvania Location within the United States
- Nearest city: Mahaffey, Pennsylvania
- Coordinates: 40°52′48″N 78°45′55″W
- Built: 1873
- Architectural style: Burr Truss
- NRHP reference No.: 80003475
- Added to NRHP: April 17, 1980

The McGees Mills Covered Bridge is a historic Burr truss wooden covered bridge located near Mahaffey, Clearfield County, Pennsylvania, United States. It is a 109-feet bridge built in 1873 over the West Branch of the Susquehanna River.

It was listed on the National Register of Historic Places in 1988.

== See also ==
- National Register of Historic Places listings in Clearfield County, Pennsylvania
