= Pine Township, Clearfield County, Pennsylvania =

Township in Pennsylvania, US

Coordinates: 41°07′36″N 78°29′55″W

- Township
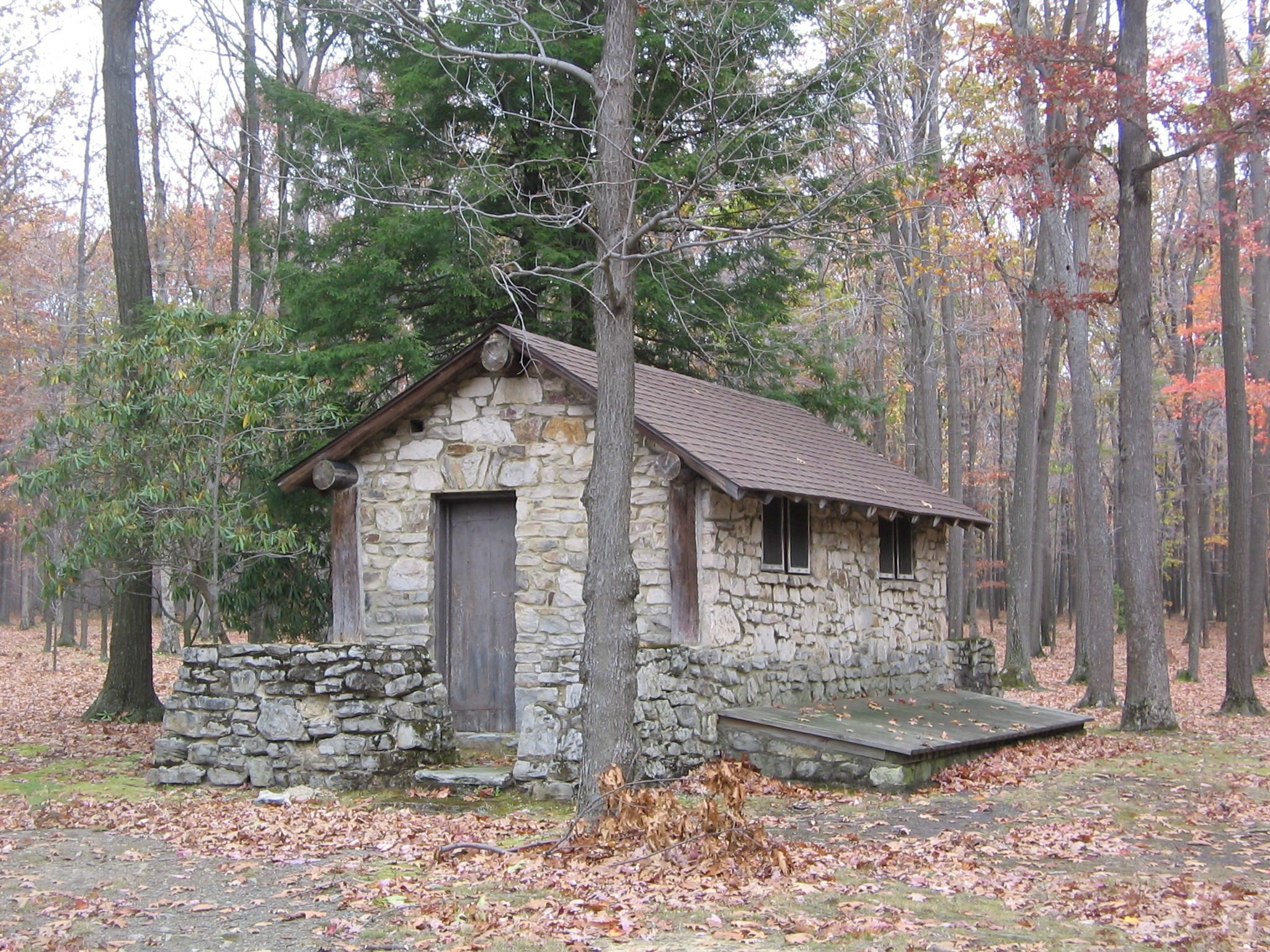
- A CCC built latrine at S. B. Elliott State Park

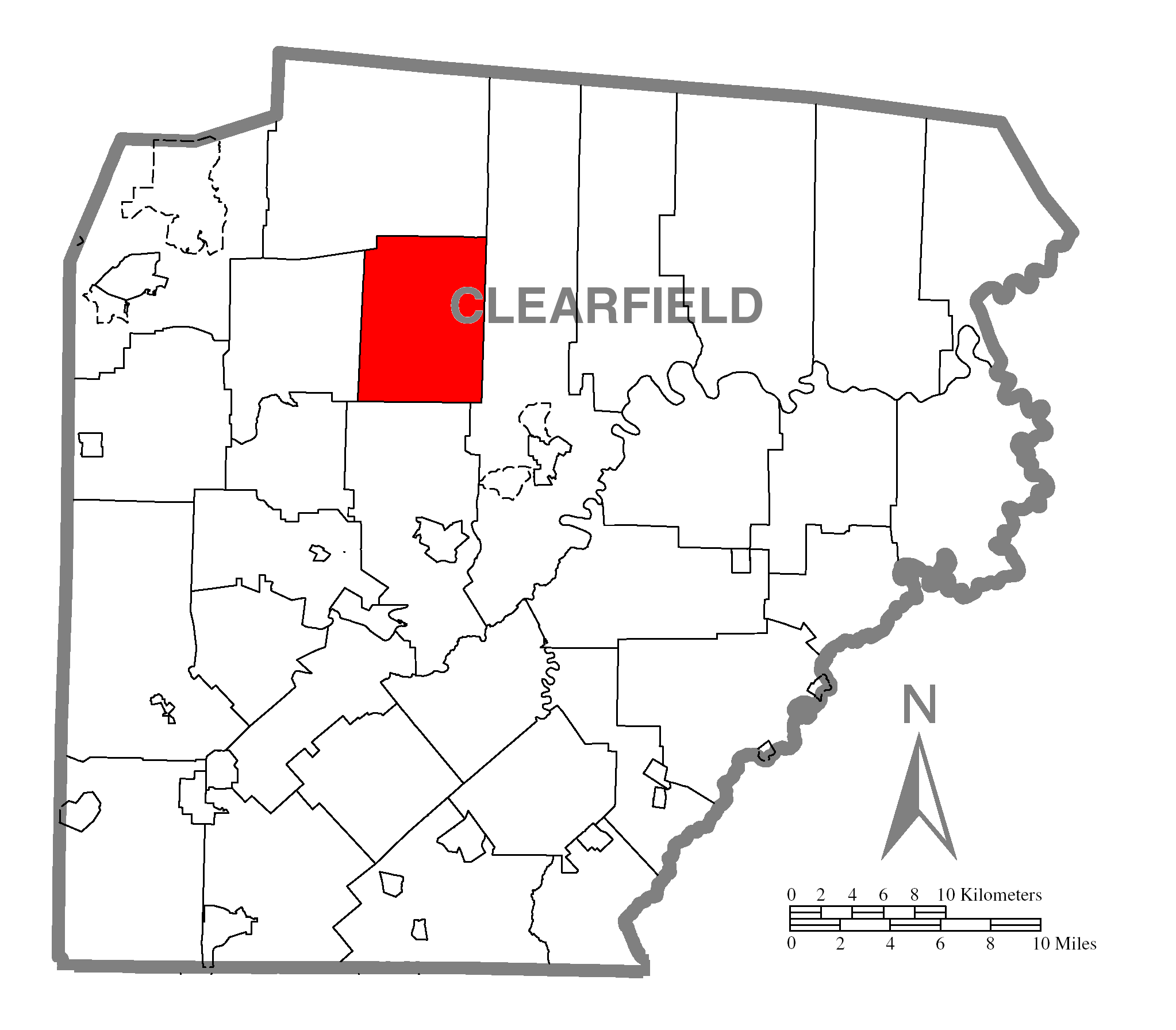
- Map of Clearfield County, Pennsylvania highlighting Pine Township

- Map of Clearfield County, Pennsylvania
- Country: United States
- State: Pennsylvania
- County: Clearfield
- Incorporated: 1873

Area
  - Total: 31.88 sq mi (82.57 km^{2})
  - Land: 31.87 sq mi (82.55 km^{2})
  - Water: 0.0077 sq mi (0.02 km^{2})

Population (2020)
  - Total: 59 ▼
  - Estimate (2021): 59
  - Density: 1.8/sq mi (0.71/km^{2})
- Time zone: UTC-5 (Eastern (EST))
  - Summer (DST): UTC-4 (EDT)
- Area code: 814
- FIPS code: 42-033-60288

Pine Township is a township that is located in Clearfield County, Pennsylvania, United States. The population was fifty-nine at the time of the 2020 census.

== Geography ==
According to the United States Census Bureau, the township has a total area of 32.0 square miles (83.0 km^{2}), all land.

Anderson Creek, a Class II-III+ whitewater stream that is a defining feature of the Eastern Continental Divide. is located in this township.

== Demographics ==
Historical population
Census	Pop.	Note	%±
2000	77		—
2010	60		−22.1%
2020	59		−1.7%
2021 (est.)	59		0.0%
U.S. Decennial Census

As of the census of 2000, there were 77 people, 34 households, and 24 families residing in the township.

The population density was 2.4 people per square mile (0.9/km^{2}). There were 117 housing units at an average density of 3.7/sq mi (1.4/km^{2}). The racial makeup of the township was 100.00% White.

There were 34 households, out of which 26.5% had children under the age of eighteen living with them; 67.6% were married couples living together, 2.9% had a female householder with no husband present, and 26.5% were non-families. 26.5% of all households were made up of individuals, and 11.8% had someone living alone who was sixty-five years of age or older.

The average household size was 2.26 and the average family size was 2.52.

Within the township, the population was spread out, with 18.2% of residents who were under the age of eighteen, 3.9% who were aged eighteen to twenty-four, 36.4% who were aged twenty-five to sixty-four, 31.2% who were aged forty-five to sixty-four, and 10.4% who were sixty-five years of age or older. The median age was forty-one years.

For every one hundred females, there were 102.6 males. For every one hundred females who were aged eighteen or older, there were 90.9 males.

The median income for a household in the township was $53,750, and the median income for a family was $61,875. Males had a median income of $36,500 compared with that of $33,750 for females.

The per capita income for the township was $26,319.

With respect to financial hardship, 6.8% of the population was living below the poverty line, including 27.3% of those who were aged sixty-five or older; however, no children under the age of eighteen and no families were living in poverty.

== Education ==
Pine Township is served by the Clearfield Area School District.

== Recreation ==
S. B. Elliott State Park, a Pennsylvania state park, is located in Pine Township. Many of the structures at the park were built by the CCC during the Great Depression and are now on the National Register of Historic Places.
