= Burnside, Pennsylvania =

Borough in Pennsylvania, US

- Borough
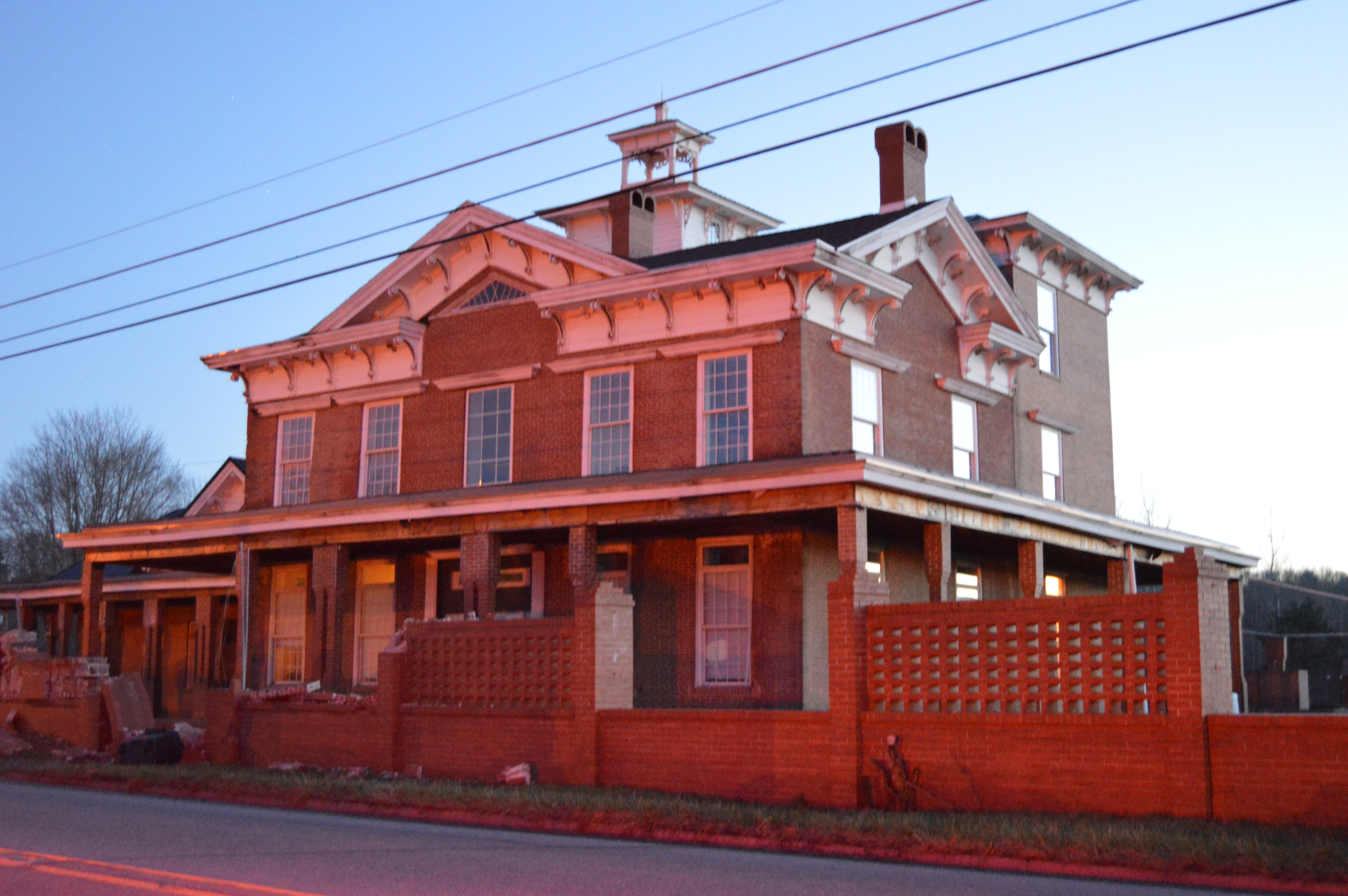
- The Irvin-Patchin House on Main Street

- Location of Burnside in Clearfield County, Pennsylvania.

- Map showing Clearfield County in Pennsylvania

- Pennsylvania
- Coordinates: 40°48′48″N 78°47′31″W
- Country: United States
- State: Pennsylvania
- County: Clearfield
- Incorporated: 1874

Government
  - Type: Borough Council

Area
  - Total: 1.73 sq mi (4.49 km^{2})
  - Land: 1.68 sq mi (4.35 km^{2})
  - Water: 0.054 sq mi (0.14 km^{2})
- Elevation: 1,312 ft (400 m)

Population (2020)
  - Total: 188
  - Density: 112/sq mi (43.2/km^{2})
- Time zone: UTC-5 (Eastern (EST))
  - Summer (DST): UTC-4 (EDT)
- ZIP code: 15721
- Area code: 814
- FIPS code: 42-10280
- GNIS feature ID: 1215094

Burnside is a borough that is located in Clearfield County, Pennsylvania, United States. The population was 188 at thetime of the 2020 census.

== Geography ==
Burnside is located in southwestern Clearfield County along the West Branch Susquehanna River. It is bordered on the north, east, and south by Burnside Township and on the west by Indiana County.

U.S. Route 219 passes through the borough, leading north 37 miles (60 km) to DuBois and south 26 miles (42 km) to Ebensburg.

According to the United States Census Bureau, Burnside has a total area of 1.73 square miles (4.49 km^{2}), of which 1.68 square miles (4.35 km^{2}) is land and 0.054 square miles (0.14 km^{2}), or 3.16%, is water.

== Demographics ==
Historical population
Census	Pop.	Note	%±
1880	279		—
1890	292		4.7%
1900	647		121.6%
1910	493		−23.8%
1920	480		−2.6%
1930	350		−27.1%
1940	414		18.3%
1950	400		−3.4%
1960	307		−23.2%
1970	316		2.9%
1980	347		9.8%
1990	350		0.9%
2000	283		−19.1%
2010	234		−17.3%
2020	188		−19.7%
2021 (est.)	189	▲	0.5%

As of the census of 2000, there were 283 people, 102 households, and seventy-nine families residing in the borough.

The population density was 168.8 inhabitants per square mile (65.2/km^{2}). There were 115 housing units at an average density of 68.6 per square mile (26.5/km^{2}).

The racial makeup of the borough was 100.00% White.

There were 102 households, out of which 35.3% had children who were under the age of eighteen living with them, 61.8% were married couples living together, 11.8% had a female householder with no husband present, and 21.6% were non-families. 17.6% of all households were made up of individuals, and 7.8% had someone living alone who was sixty-five years of age or older.

The average household size was 2.77 and the average family size was 3.10.

Within the borough, the population was spread out, with 25.1% of residents who were under the age of eighteen, 8.8% from who were aged eighteen to twenty-four, 27.9% who were aged twenty-five to forty-four, 25.8% who were aged forty-five to sixty-four, and 12.4% who were sixty-five years of age or older. The median age was thirty-seven years.

For every one hundred females, there were 106.6 males. For every one hundred females who were aged eighteen or older, there were 100.0 males.

The median income for a household in the borough was $21,818, and the median income for a family was $22,031. Males had a median income of $25,833 compared with that of $12,250 for females.

The per capita income for the borough was $9,993.

Approximately 22.2% of families and 27.2% of the population were living below the poverty line, including 48.5% of those who were under the age of eighteen and 4.4% of those who were sixty-five or older.
