= Keating (surname) =

Keating (/ˈkiːtɪŋ/; Irish spelling: Céitinn) is an Irish and English family name.

== Surname variations ==
Common variations on the Keating surname include Caton, Kaitting, Kating, Keatinge, Keaton, Keith, Keting, Keatting, McKeating, Keatings and O'Keating. A Spanish variation, Cienfuegos, also exists.

== Notable people ==
- Ailsa Keating, mathematician
- AnaLouise Keating (born 1961), academic, professor of Multicultural Women's and Gender Studies
- Brian Keating (born 1971), American cosmologist
- Caron Keating (1962−2004), British TV personality
- Charles Keating (1923−2014), American lawyer, banker, best known for his involvement in the savings and loan scandal of the late 1980s, The Keating Five Scandal
- Charles Keating (actor) (1941−2014), English actor and narrator of audiobooks
- Chris Keating (musician) (born 1982), lead singer of American band Yeasayer
- Dan Keating (1902−2007), longest surviving veteran of the Irish War of Independence
- Dennis Keating (born 1940), Irish footballer
- Derek Keating (1955–2023), Irish Fine Gael politician
- Dominic Keating (born 1962), British actor
- Donald Keating (1924–1995), British lawyer
- Edward Keating (1875–1965), American newspaper editor and politician, U.S. representative for Colorado, who sponsored the Keating–Owen Child Labor Act of 1916
- Edward Michael Keating (1925–2003), American publisher, journalist, lawyer; founder of Ramparts magazine, member of the New Left movement
- Edwin Joseph (Ted) Keating (1910−1987), academic and director of the Bank of New Zealand
- Frank Keating (born 1944), American politician; governor of Oklahoma
- Frank Keating (journalist) (1937−2013), English sports journalist and author
- Frank A. Keating (1895−1973), Major General of the United States Army
- Fred Keating (disambiguation), several people
- Geoffrey Keating (c.1569−c.1644), Irish theologian and historian
- Gladys Keating (1923-2014), Virginia businesswoman, civic activist and politician
- H. R. F. Keating (1926−2011), British novelist
- Henry Sheehy Keating (1775-1847), officer of the British Army during the French Revolutionary and Napoleonic Wars, father of Henry Singer Keating
- Henry Singer Keating (1804−1888), British lawyer and barrister
- Isabel Keating, American actress and singer
- James Keating, multiple people
- John Keating (disambiguation), multiple people
- Jonathan Keating, British mathematician
- Joseph C. Keating Jr. (1950−2007), US psychologist
- Josephine E. Keating (1838−1908), American literary critic, musician music teacher
- Judith Keating (1957−2021), Canadian senator
- Justin Keating (1930−2009), Irish Labour Party politician
- Karl Keating (born 1950), American Catholic apologist
- Keith Keating, American business executive and writer
- Kenneth Keating (1900−1975), American politician, congressional representative and senator for New York, U.S. ambassador to India and Israel
- Khiara Keating (born 2004), English footballer
- Larry Keating (1899−1963), American actor
- Michael Keating (disambiguation), multiple people
- Patrick N. Keating, theoretical physicist, of the Keating model
- Paul Keating (born 1944), 24th Prime Minister of Australia
- Richard E. Keating (1941−2006), American astronomer, known for the Hafele–Keating experiment
- Richard Harte Keatinge (1825−1904), soldier
- Robert Brendon Keating (1924−2012), American diplomat
- Roly Keating (born 1961), chief executive of the British Library
- Ronan Keating (born 1977), Irish singer
- Seán Keating, (1889−1977), Irish painter, President of the Royal Hibernian Academy
- Sean P. Keating (1903−1976), Irish Republican Army veteran and Irish-American activist and political figure
- Timothy J. Keating (born 1948), American admiral
- Tim Keating (born 1961), Chief of the New Zealand Defence Force
- Thomas Keating (1923−2018), monk, founder of Centering Prayer movement
- Tom Keating (1917−1984), art restorer and forger
- Trenna Keating, Canadian actress
- William H. Keating (1799−1840), American geologist
- William J. Keating (1927–2020), American politician, representative for Ohio's 1st district
- William R. Keating (born 1952), American politician, representative for Massachusetts' 9th congressional district
- Zoë Keating (born 1972), Canadian cellist and composer
- Maurice Keatinge (c.1761−1835), Irish landowner, soldier and politician
- Paffard Keatinge-Clay (1926–2023), British-born architect and sculptor

== Fictional people ==
- Lieutenant Colonel Harry Keating, in The Mauritius Command, a 1977 novel by Patrick O'Brian, based on the real life Henry Sheehy Keating
- John Keating, played by Robin Williams in the 1989 film Dead Poets Society
- John Paul Keating, played by Shaun Evans in the television series Teachers
- Layla Keating, played by Greta Onieogou in the television series All American
- Peter Keating, in The Fountainhead, a 1943 novel by Ayn Rand

Multiple characters in How to Get Away With Murder:

- Annalise Keating, played by Viola Davis, fictional defense lawyer and law professor
- Dr. Hannah Keating, Annalise's sister-in-law, played by Marcia Gay Harden
- Sam Keating, Annalise's husband, played by Tom Verica
- Keating 5, Annalise Keating's interns in How to Get Away With Murder

== Keating genealogy ==
=== DNA projects and one name studies ===
- Keating DNA Project (hosted by FamilyTreeDNA.com, run by volunteers)

=== Published Keating genealogies ===
- Keating, John Percy (1918). John Keating and His Forebears – via Internet Archive. Reprinted from Records of the American Catholic Historical Society, v. XXIX, No. 4, December 1918.
- Keating of Wexford.
- Lodge, John; Archdall, Mervyn (1789). "John (b. circa 1150, 6th son of Odo of Carmarthenshire, Wales) from whom those of the name Keating in this Kingdom derive". The peerage of Ireland: or, A genealogical history of the present nobility of that kingdom. Vol. II. p. 183.
