= Keating =

Keating may refer to:

== People ==
- Keating (surname), including a list of persons and fictional characters
  - Paul Keating (born 1944), former Australian Prime Minister

== Places ==
=== Canada ===
- Keating Channel, a waterway in Toronto, Ontario

=== United States ===
- Keating, Oregon, an unincorporated community
- Keating, Pennsylvania, an unincorporated community
- Keating Summit, Pennsylvania, an unincorporated community
- East Keating Township, Pennsylvania
- Keating Township, McKean County, Pennsylvania
- Keating Township, Potter County, Pennsylvania
- West Keating Township, Pennsylvania

== Other uses ==
- Keating!, a musical about Paul Keating
- Charles V. Keating Millennium Centre, Antigonish, Nova Scotia, Canada
- Keating Five, the collective name for five senators: Alan Cranston, Dennis DeConcini, John Glenn, John McCain, and Donald W. Riegle, Jr.
- Keating Model, potential between atoms
- Keating Natatorium, St. Xavier High School, Cincinnati, Ohio, US
- Keating TKR (Keating Supercars), a British automaker
