= West Branch Area Junior/Senior High School =

Public school in Pennsylvania, United States

Coordinates: 40.97954°N 78.20293°W

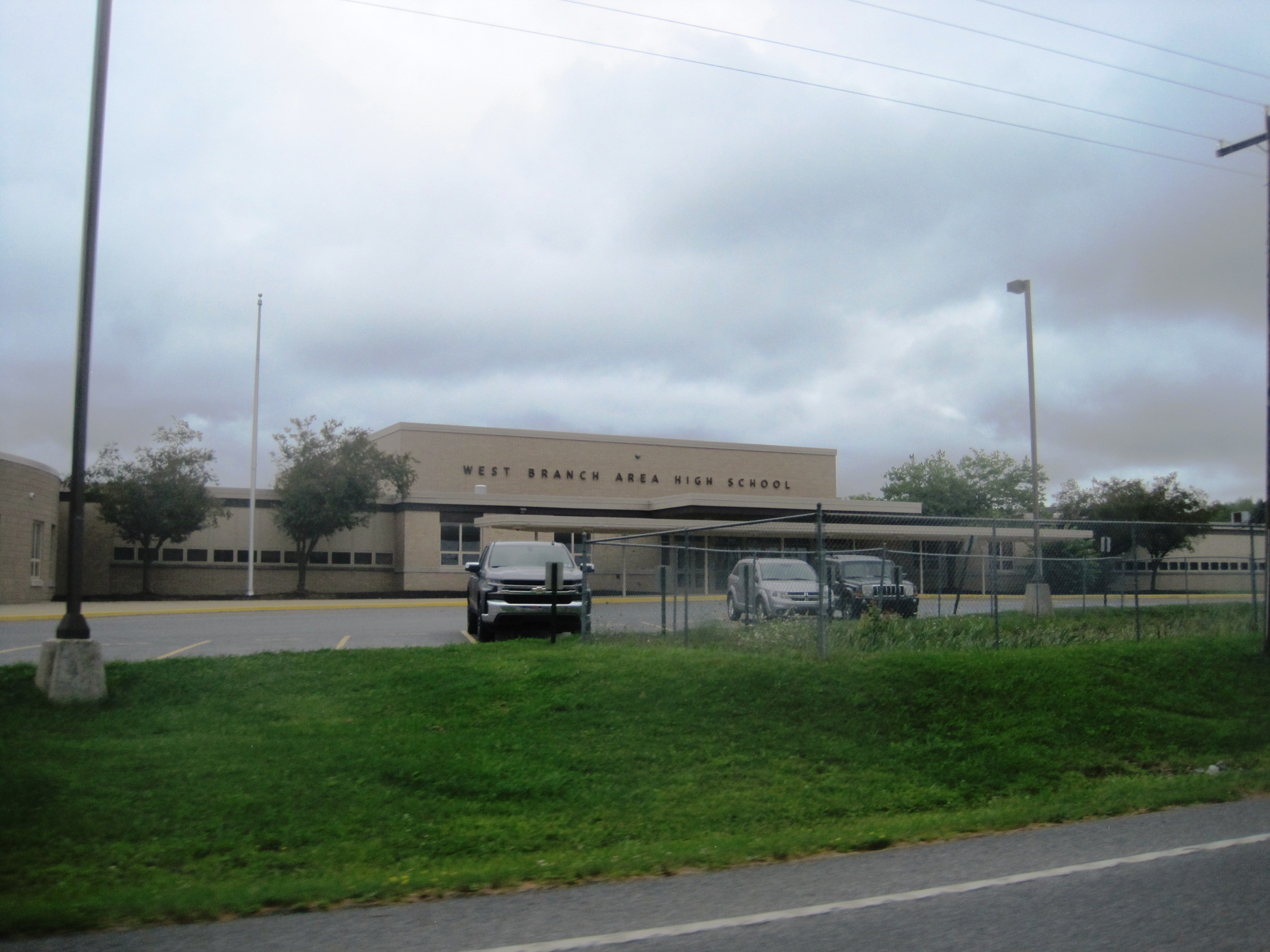

Location
- 444 Allport Cutoff; Morrisdale, Clinton County and Clearfield County, Pennsylvania 16858; United States

Information
- Type: Public
- Motto: Learn Today, Compete Tomorrow, Succeed Always
- Principal: Joeseph R. Holenchik
- Faculty: 42 teachers (2012); 47 teachers (2010)
- Grades: 7th - 12th
- Enrollment: 549 pupils (2012);
- Language: English
- Campus type: Rural
- Colors: Red, White and Royal Blue
- Mascot: Warriors
- Feeder schools: West Branch Area Elementary School
- Website: http://www.westbranch.org/category/west-branch-high-school/

West Branch Area Junior/Senior High School is a small, rural, public high school located near the village of Morrisdale, Pennsylvania. The high school serves students from most of north eastern Clearfield County, and West Keating Township in Clinton County. The school is part of the West Branch Area School District. The current school building was completed in 1964. An addition to the High School building was finished in 2005.

In 2013, enrollment at West Branch Area Junior Senior High School was reported as 549 pupils in 7th through 12th grades.

West Branch Area High School students may choose to attend Clearfield County Career and Technology Center for training in the construction and mechanical trades; Architectural Drafting & Design Technology; Allied Health Services; Cosmetology; and Culinary Arts & Food Management. The Central Intermediate Unit IU10 provides the District with a wide variety of services like specialized education for disabled students and hearing, speech and visual disability services and professional development for staff and faculty.
