= Villa Rosa, Martinsicuro =

Villa Rosa
- Frazione
- Interactive map of Villa Rosa
- Coordinates: 42°51′09″N 13°55′21″E
- Country: Italy
- Region: Abruzzo
- Province: Teramo
- Commune: Martinsicuro

Population (2001)
  - Total: 3,661
- Time zone: UTC+1 (CET)
  - Summer (DST): UTC+2 (CEST)

Villa Rosa is a frazione (subdivision) of the town of Martinsicuro, Province of Teramo, in the Abruzzo region of Italy.

== History ==
The town began to develop in the second half of the 19th century with the name of Villa Franchi (they were a family of local landowners). In the early twentieth century it took the name of Villa Rosa. For a long time it was part of the municipality of Colonnella, and subsequently detaching itself from it together with Martinsicuro in 1963.

== Architecture ==
In the hamlet of Villa Rosa there are a few notable buildings, including Villa Franchi (late 19th century) in Via Roma-Via Petrolini; Villa Franchi (1902) in Via Filzi; Castellaccio Franchi (1850–1860) in C.da Civita; Villa Flaiani (1813–1860) in Via Col di Lana; the so-called Casette Flaiani (early 1900s) in Via Risorgimento.
