= West Branch Area School District =

School district in Pennsylvania

Coordinates: 40.97866°N 78.20377°W

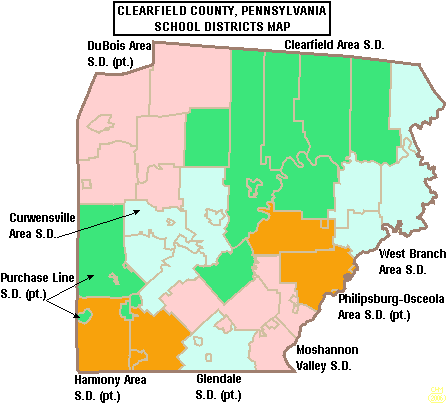

Address
- 516 Allport Cutoff Morrisdale, Clearfield County and Clinton County, Pennsylvania, 16858-9312; United States

District information
- Type: Public

Students and staff
- Colors: Red, white, and royal blue

Other information
- Website: www.westbranch.org

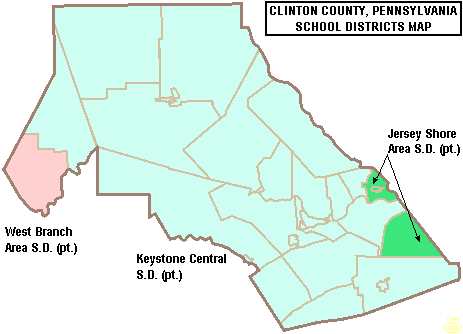
portion of West Branch Area School District region in Clinton County

West Branch Area School District is a mid-sized, rural, public school district located in Morrisdale, Clearfield County, and Clinton County. The district is one of the 500 public school districts of Pennsylvania. West Branch Area School District was created in 1958 by the joining of Cooper Township High School and Morris Township High School. The district also includes Karthaus Township and Graham Township. The district extends across Clearfield County's eastern border to include West Keating Township in Clinton County. West Branch Area School District encompasses approximately 165 square miles (430 km^{2}). According to 2000 federal census data, it served a resident population of 7,833. By 2010, the district's population was 7,857 people. The educational attainment levels for the school district population (25 years old and over) were 85% high school graduates and 9.3% college graduates. In 2009, West Branch Area School District residents' per capita income was $15,055, while the median family income was $37,054 a year. In the Commonwealth, the median family income was $49,501 and the United States median family income was $49,445, in 2010.

Per Distr West Branch Area School District operates three schools: West Branch Area Elementary School, West Branch Middle School, and West Branch Area Junior/Senior High School. All of the schools reside in a conjoined building. The current school building was completed in 1964, with an addition to the high school that was finished in 2005. High school students may choose to attend Clearfield County Career and Technology Center for training in the construction and mechanical trades; Architectural Drafting & Design Technology; Allied Health Services; Cosmetology; and Culinary Arts & Food Management. The Central Intermediate Unit #10 provides the district with a wide variety of services like specialized education for disabled students and hearing, speech and visual disability services and professional development for staff and faculty.

Administration:

Superintendent- Mr. Mark Mitchell

High/Middle School Principal- Mr. Kevin Hubler

Elementary School Principal- Mrs. Ashley Nunley

== Extracurriculars ==
West Branch Area School District offers a variety of clubs, activities and sports.

=== Athletics ===
West Branch's mascot is the Warrior. Their team mottos are "Warrior Power" and "Warrior Pride". They participate in the PIAA District 6 with Single-A classification in all but wrestling and baseball, where they compete in Double-A. Noteworthy athletic achievements include five PIAA individual state champions in wrestling (Jerry White, Robert English, Justin Owens, Jared Ricotta & Reynold 'Buzzy' Maines), winning a district championship in football in 1988, a district championship in baseball, a team district duals championship in wrestling, and other various conference championships. Former Warrior baseball players Ed Veres and John Prestash were selected in the Major League Baseball draft straight out of high school. Larry Beightol, a former football player at West Branch, is an offensive line coach in the NFL, most recently working with the Detroit Lions. Wrestling State Champion Jared Ricotta, after starting four years for the Duquesne Dukes Division I Wrestling Team and capturing three Northeast Regional Titles was recruited by NASCAR's Hendrick Motorsports as a professional tire changer.

Starting in fall 2010, West Branch and local school Philipsburg-Osceola School District agreed to a co-op boys soccer program. Any 9-12th grade boy wishing to play soccer now plays with the Philipsburg Soccer team.

The district funds

Varsity

Boys

- Baseball - AA
- Basketball- AA
- Cross country - A
- Football - A
- Soccer - AA
- Track and field - AA
- Wrestling - AA

Girls

- Basketball - A
- Cross country - A
- Soccer - A
- Softball - A
- Track and field - AA
- Volleyball - A

Junior high middle school sports

Boys

- Basketball
- Football
- Wrestling
- Baseball

Girls

- Basketball
- Softball
