= Grassflat, Pennsylvania =

Unincorporated community in Pennsylvania, US

- Census-designated place
- Location in Pennsylvania Grassflat (the United States)
- Coordinates: 41°0′9″N 78°6′52″W
- Country: United States
- State: Pennsylvania
- County: Clearfield
- Township: Cooper

Area
  - Total: 1.13 sq mi (2.93 km^{2})
  - Land: 1.13 sq mi (2.93 km^{2})
  - Water: 0 sq mi (0.00 km^{2})
- Elevation: 1,470 ft (450 m)

Population (2020)
  - Total: 479
  - Density: 423/sq mi (163.5/km^{2})
- Time zone: UTC-5 (Eastern (EST))
  - Summer (DST): UTC-4 (EDT)
- ZIP code: 16839
- FIPS code: 42-30528
- GNIS feature ID: 1175985

Grassflat is a census-designated place located in Cooper Township, Clearfield County, in the state of Pennsylvania. As of the 2020 census, the population was 479.

Pennsylvania Route 53 passes just west of the community, leading 3 miles (5 km) southwest to Interstate 80, Exit 133 at Kylertown and 12 miles (19 km) east to Snow Shoe.

== Demographics ==
Historical population
Census	Pop.	Note	%±
2010	511		—
2020	479		−6.3%
U.S. Decennial Census
