= TKR =

TKR may refer to:

- Keating TKR, an English car
- People's Security Army, Indonesia
- Team Kiwi Racing, a car racing team
- Team Knight Rider, a TV series
- Thakurgaon Airport (IATA airport code)
- Timken Company, a bearing manufacturer, NYSE symbol
- Total knee replacement, a surgical procedure
- Trinbago Knight Riders, a Twenty20 cricket team
