= Sylvan Grove =

Sylvan Grove may refer to:

- Sylvan Grove, Kansas, a city in Lincoln County
- Sylvan Grove, Pennsylvania, an unincorporated community in Clearfield County
