= GPX =

GPX may refer to:

== Science and technology ==
- Glutathione peroxidase (GPx), an enzyme family
- GPS Exchange Format (GPX), for GPS data (released 2002)
- Kawasaki Ninja GPX-250R, a motorcycle model (released 1986)

== Other uses ==
- Gautampura Road railway station, Ujjain, Madhya Pradesh, India
- GP Strategies Corporation, an American consulting firm (NYSE ticker:GPX)
- GPX Tire Corporation, an American company producing tires
- Grand Prix (disambiguation), French for "Grand Prize", used in several sports
