= Allport, Pennsylvania =

Unincorporated community in Pennsylvania, US

- Census-designated place
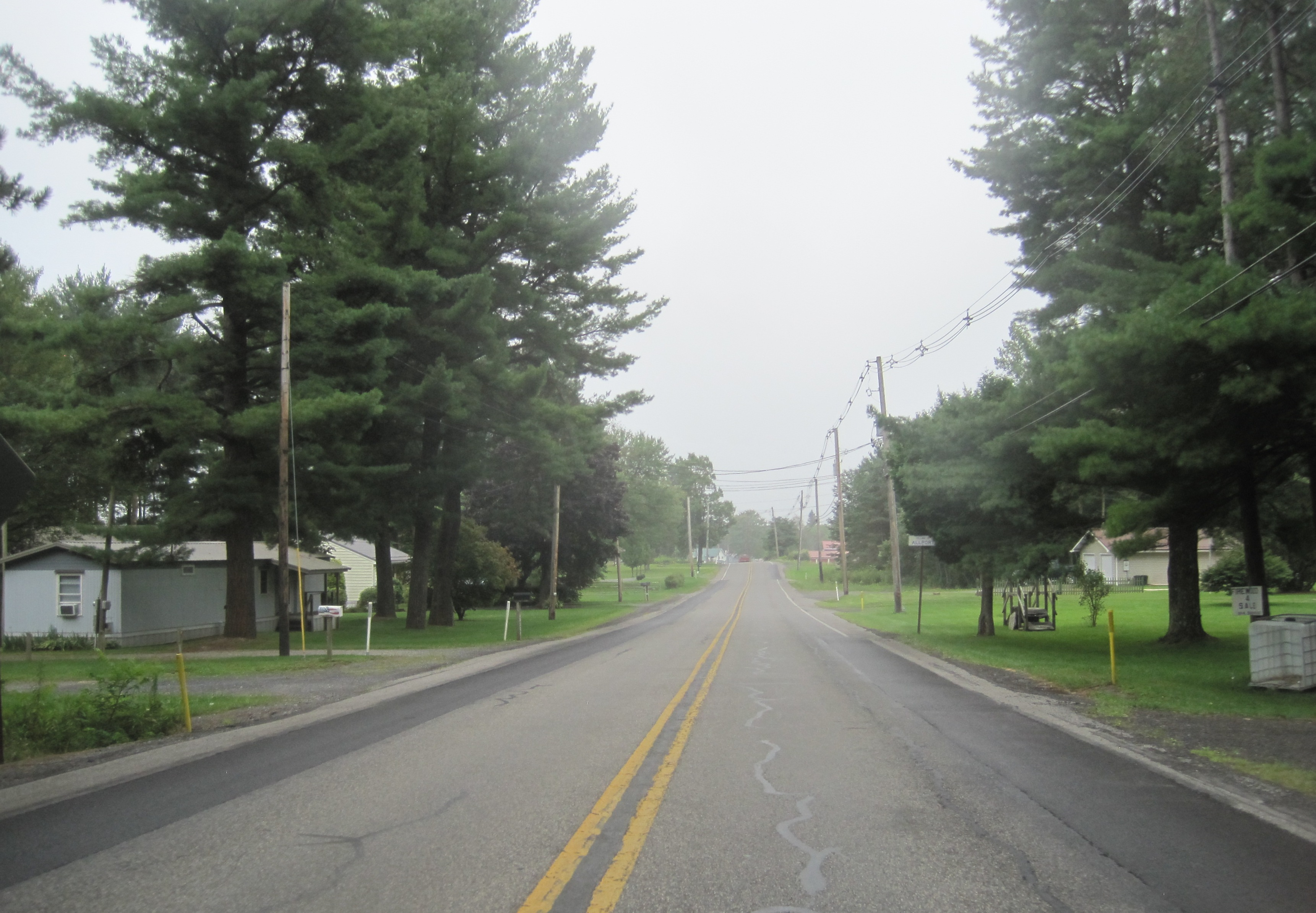
- PA 53 southbound entering Allport

- Location in Pennsylvania Allport (the United States)
- Coordinates: 40°57′56″N 78°12′5″W
- Country: United States
- State: Pennsylvania
- County: Clearfield
- Township: Morris

Area
  - Total: 0.60 sq mi (1.55 km^{2})
  - Land: 0.60 sq mi (1.55 km^{2})
  - Water: 0.0039 sq mi (0.01 km^{2})
- Elevation: 1,600 ft (490 m)

Population (2020)
  - Total: 230
  - Density: 385.3/sq mi (148.78/km^{2})
- Time zone: UTC-5 (Eastern (EST))
  - Summer (DST): UTC-4 (EDT)
- ZIP code: 16821
- FIPS code: 42-02072
- GNIS feature ID: 1168213

Allport is a census-designated place, which is located in Morris Township, Clearfield County, in the state of Pennsylvania.

As of the 2020 census, the population was 230.

Pennsylvania Route 53 passes through Allport, leading northeast 2.5 miles (4.0 km) to Interstate 80, Exit 133 at Kylertown and south 6 miles (10 km) to Philipsburg.

== Demographics ==
Between the time of the 2010 and 2020 federal census counts, the population remained static at 230.
