= John Keating =

John Keating may refer to:

== Politics ==
- John Keating (Australian politician) (1872–1940), Australian politician
- John Keating (Irish politician) (1869–1956), Irish National League / Cumann na nGaedhael / Fine Gael politician from Wexford

== Others ==
- John Keating (judge) (1630–1691), Irish judge who became Chief Justice of the Irish Common Pleas
- John Keating (land developer) (1760–1853), Irish-born soldier in the French army
- John Keating (sportscaster), US sportscaster
- John D'Arcy Keating (born 1952), Canadian former professional ice hockey player
- John Richard Keating (1934–1998), American clergyman of the Roman Catholic Church
- Johnny Keating (1927–2015), Scottish musician
- Seán Keating (1889–1977), Irish painter, President of the Royal Hibernian Academy

== Fictional characters ==
- John Keating, character in Dead Poets Society
- John Paul Keating, character in Teachers
