= Peale, Pennsylvania =

Coordinates: 40°59′52″N 78°04′53″W

Peale, Pennsylvania is a ghost town located in Cooper Township, Clearfield County, Pennsylvania. It was founded in 1883 and was named after S.R. Peale of Lock Haven.

An excerpt from The Raftman's Journal, published on August 20, 1885, describes more in-depth what the town was like:

The town of Peale is located on the line of the Beech Creek Railroad 75 miles west of Williamsport. It was named after S.R. Peale of Lock Haven and is owned, and everything in it too, by the coal company. Two years ago the ground was a wilderness; today there are nearly 300 buildings and a population of 2,500 souls in the place, every one of whom is employed or dependent upon those employed by the coal or railroad company.

The town was built on a hill above Moravian Run. It is divided in two by a small tributary stream. The place is laid out with all the regularity of a city. Down in the ravine, at the foot of town are the slaughter houses, while all the stables drain into the little stream running through the center. A reservoir in back of town distributes pure water into every street and to every house in the place. The houses are 2 story frame buildings painted brick red; wainscoted to 4 ft. and plastered throughout; three rooms on the first floor, 2 or 3 on the second. They rent for $4.25 - $6.75 per month including water. Altogether they are the most comfortable miners' cabins seen throughout the county and the rent is not high for a man earning $9 – $12 per week.

The site of the Oakwood Cemetery is one of the few distinguishable sites left in what was once a thriving coal mining town—and "distinguishable" is a very loose term. The cemetery only has one marked grave remaining, belonging to Martha Renfrew, aged 14yrs, 11mos at the time of her death.

== See also ==
- List of ghost towns in Pennsylvania
