= Morris Township, Clearfield County, Pennsylvania =

Township in Pennsylvania, US

Coordinates: 40°57′30″N 78°12′29″W

- Township
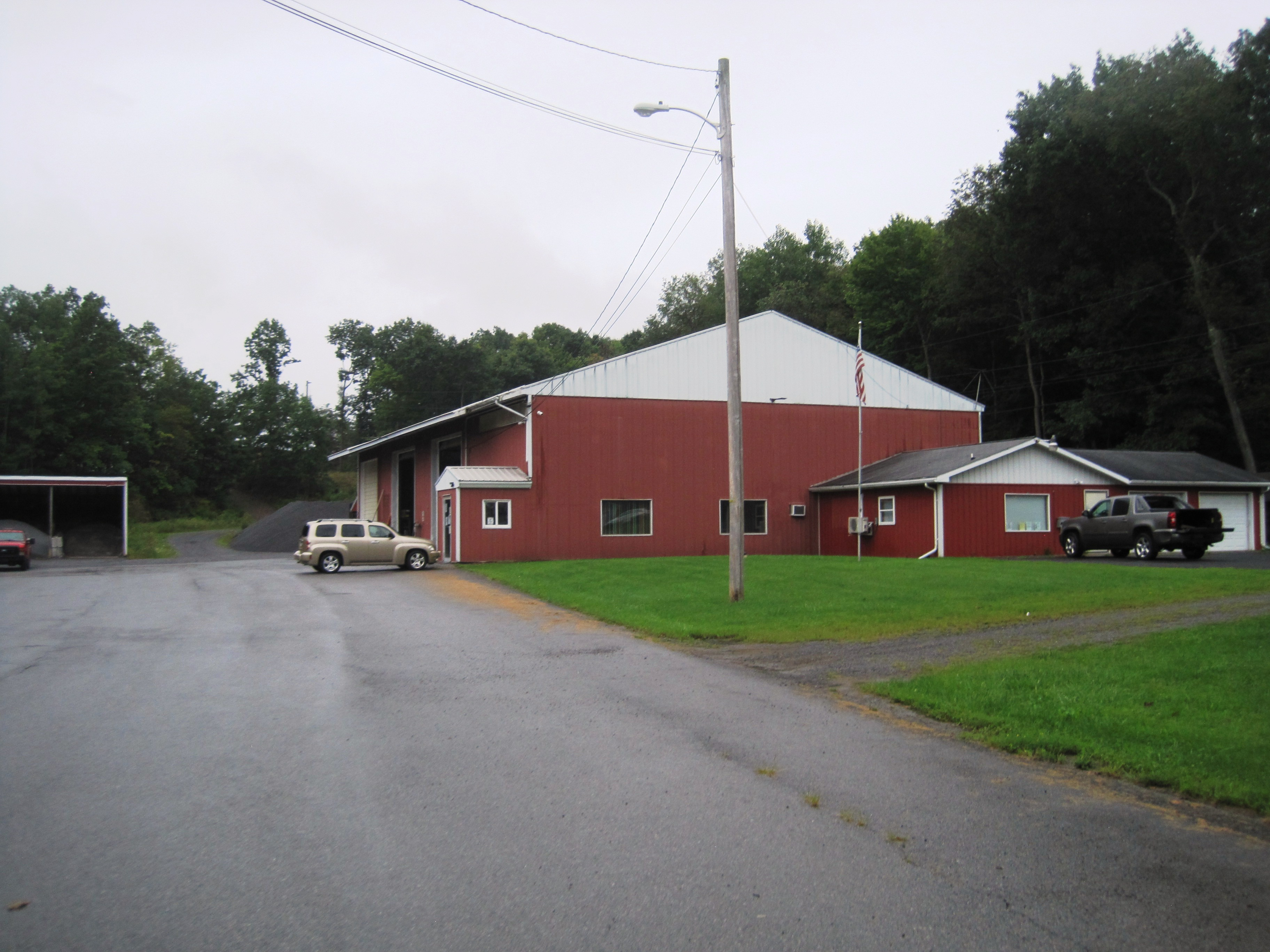
- Municipal building

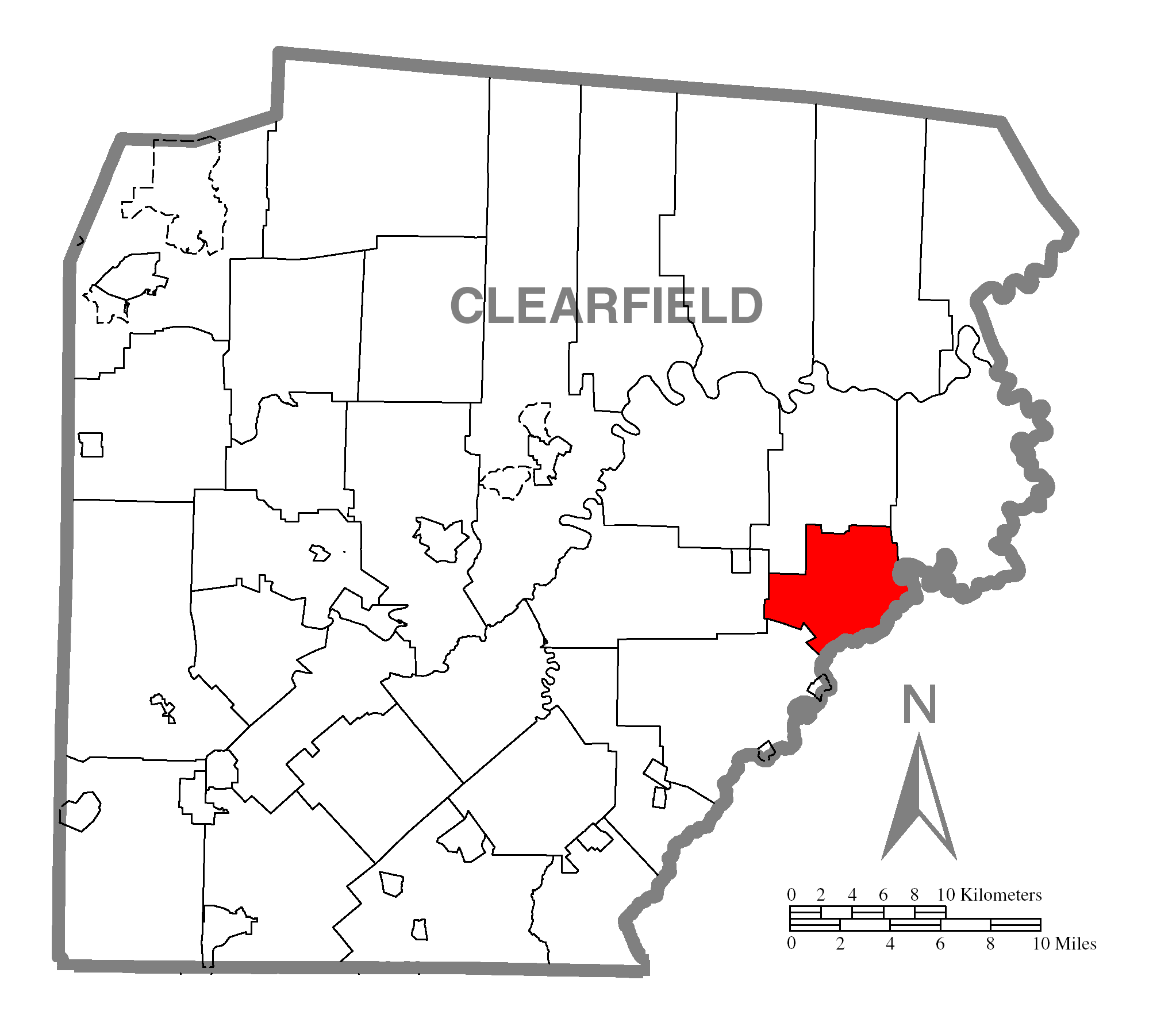
- Map of Clearfield County, Pennsylvania highlighting Morris Township

- Map of Clearfield County, Pennsylvania
- Country: United States
- State: Pennsylvania
- County: Clearfield
- Settled: 1830
- Incorporated: 1835

Area
  - Total: 19.85 sq mi (51.41 km^{2})
  - Land: 19.73 sq mi (51.09 km^{2})
  - Water: 0.12 sq mi (0.32 km^{2})

Population (2020)
  - Total: 2,776 ▼
  - Estimate (2021): 2,759
  - Density: 146.4/sq mi (56.53/km^{2})
- Time zone: UTC-5 (Eastern (EST))
  - Summer (DST): UTC-4 (EDT)
- Area code: 814
- FIPS code: 42-033-51056

Morris Township is a township that is located in Clearfield County, Pennsylvania, United States. The population was 2,776 at the time of the 2020 census.

== Geography ==
According to the United States Census Bureau, the township has a total area of 19.8 square miles (51.2 km^{2}), of which 19.7 square miles (51.1 km^{2}) is land and 0.04 square mile (0.1 km^{2}) (0.10%) is water.

== Communities ==
- Allport
- Hawk Run
- Morrisdale
- Munson
- Oak Grove
- Pardee
- Troy

== Demographics ==
Historical population
Census	Pop.	Note	%±
2000	3,063		—
2010	2,938		−4.1%
2020	2,776		−5.5%
2021 (est.)	2,759		−0.6%
U.S. Decennial Census

As of the census of 2000, there were 3,063 people, 1,224 households, and 849 families residing in the township. The population density was 155.1 inhabitants per square mile (59.9/km^{2}). There were 1,296 housing units at an average density of 65.6 per square mile (25.3/km^{2}). The racial makeup of the township was 99.44% White, 0.07% African American, 0.03% Native American, 0.16% Asian, 0.03% from other races, and 0.26% from two or more races. Hispanic or Latino of any race were 0.69% of the population.

There were 1,224 households, out of which 30.0% had children under the age of 18 living with them, 55.8% were married couples living together, 8.9% had a female householder with no husband present, and 30.6% were non-families. 26.1% of all households were made up of individuals, and 14.6% had someone living alone who was 65 years of age or older. The average household size was 2.50 and the average family size was 3.02.

In the township the population was spread out, with 24.4% under the age of 18, 6.8% from 18 to 24, 29.3% from 25 to 44, 23.4% from 45 to 64, and 16.0% who were 65 years of age or older. The median age was 38 years. For every 100 females, there were 95.8 males. For every 100 females age 18 and over, there were 91.4 males.

The median income for a household in the township was $31,515, and the median income for a family was $36,250. Males had a median income of $26,058 versus $17,260 for females. The per capita income for the township was $14,023. About 5.1% of families and 7.1% of the population were below the poverty line, including 7.3% of those under age 18 and 13.0% of those age 65 or over.

== Education ==
Students in Morris Township are served by schools in the West Branch Area School District.
