= Hawk Run, Pennsylvania =

Census-designated place in Pennsylvania, US

- Census-designated place
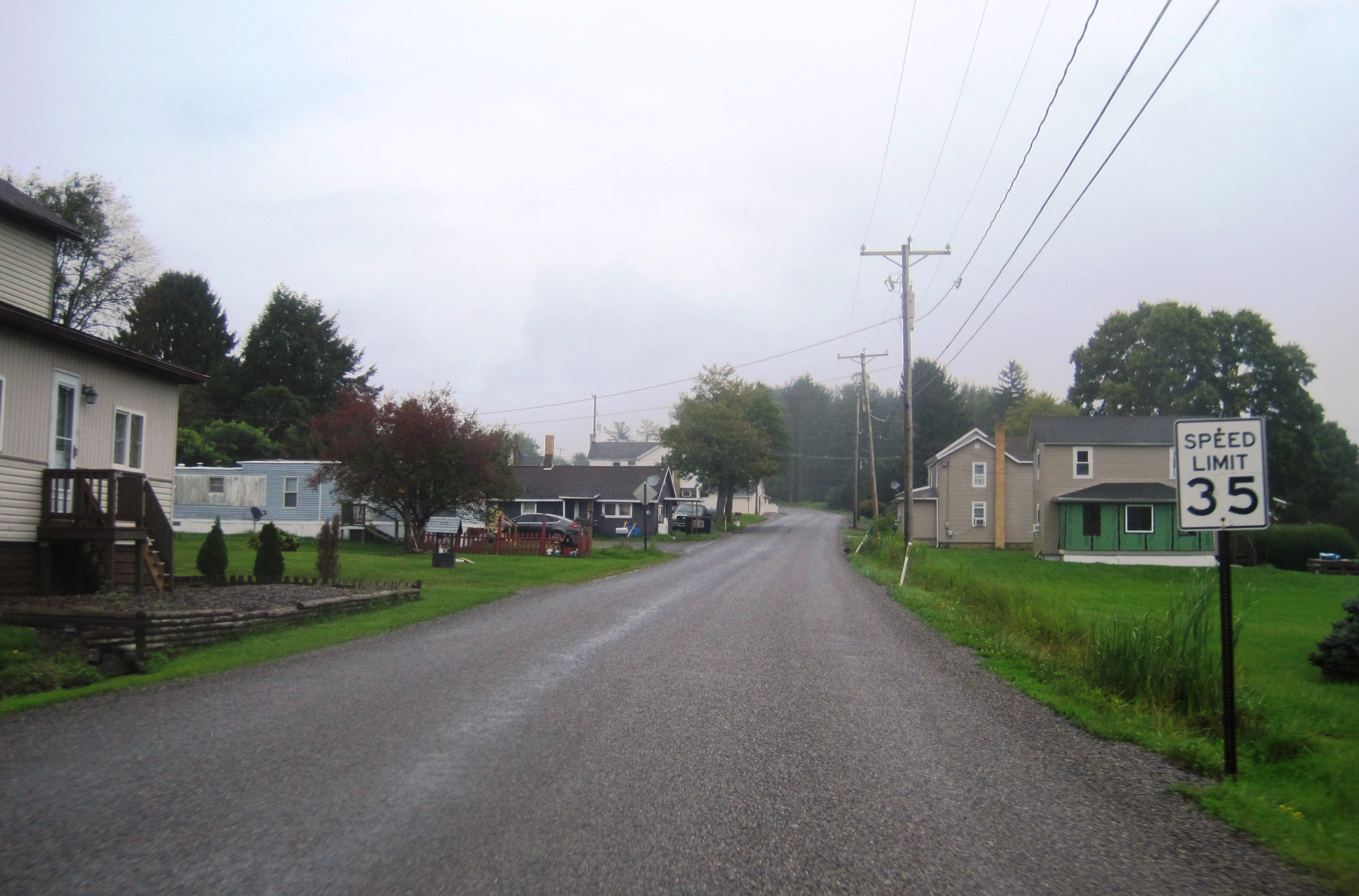
- Powell Street in Hawk Run

- Location in Pennsylvania Hawk Run (the United States)
- Coordinates: 40°55′26″N 78°12′22″W
- Country: United States
- State: Pennsylvania
- County: Clearfield
- Township: Morris

Area
  - Total: 0.81 sq mi (2.09 km^{2})
  - Land: 0.80 sq mi (2.08 km^{2})
  - Water: 0.0039 sq mi (0.01 km^{2})
- Elevation: 1,470 ft (450 m)

Population (2020)
  - Total: 474
  - Density: 590.6/sq mi (228.04/km^{2})
- Time zone: UTC-5 (Eastern (EST))
  - Summer (DST): UTC-4 (EDT)
- ZIP code: 16840
- FIPS code: 42-33184
- GNIS feature ID: 1176666

Hawk Run is a census-designated place located in Morris Township, Clearfield County, in the state of Pennsylvania. As of the 2020 census the population was 474.

It is located on the north side of Moshannon Creek, the Clearfield/Centre County boundary, approximately 3 miles (5 km) north of Philipsburg via Pennsylvania Route 53.

== Demographics ==
Historical population
Census	Pop.	Note	%±
2020	474		—
U.S. Decennial Census
