= Graham Township, Clearfield County, Pennsylvania =

Township in Pennsylvania, US

Coordinates: 40°59′00″N 78°13′59″W

Graham Township, Pennsylvania
- Township
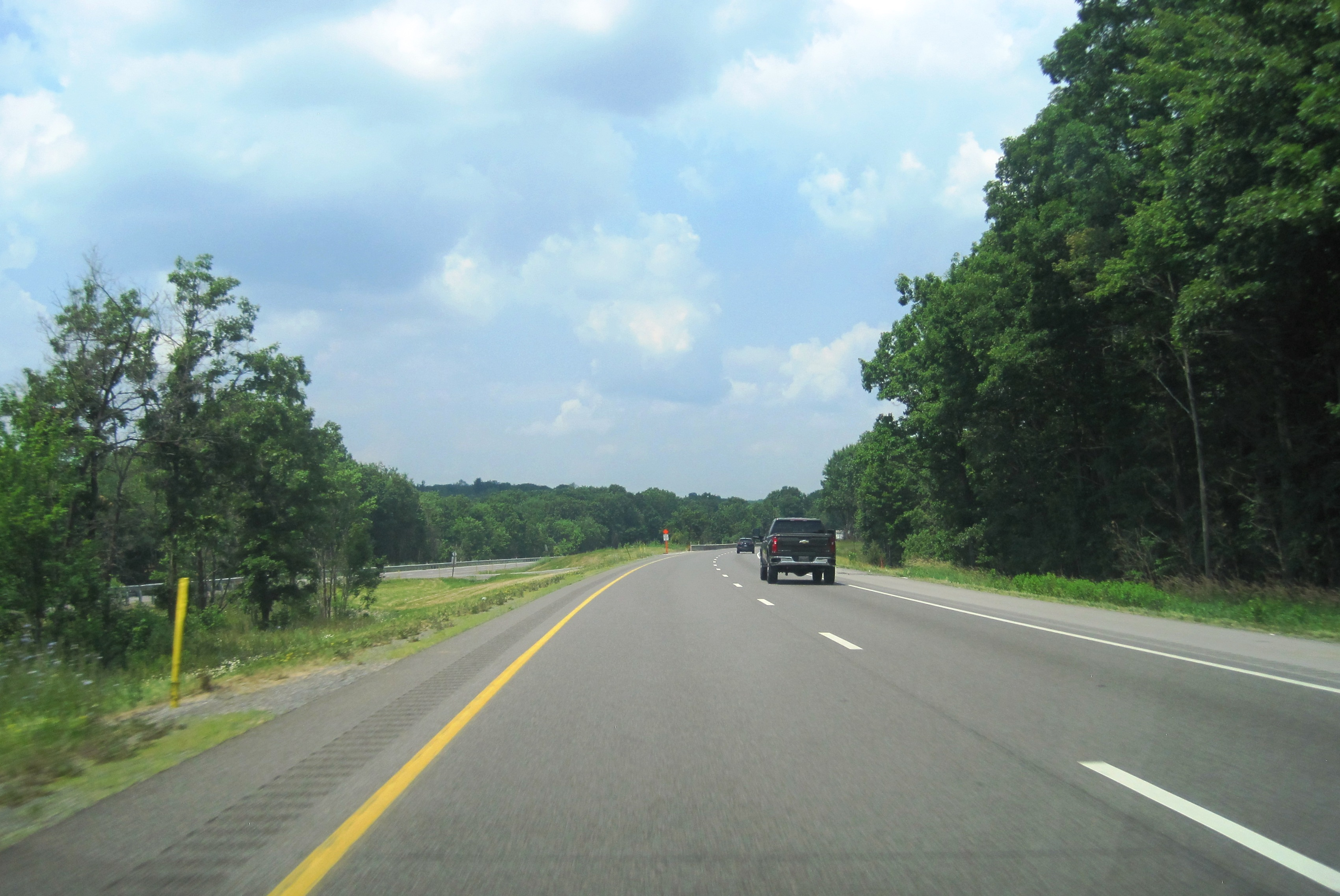
- I-80 westbound in Graham Township

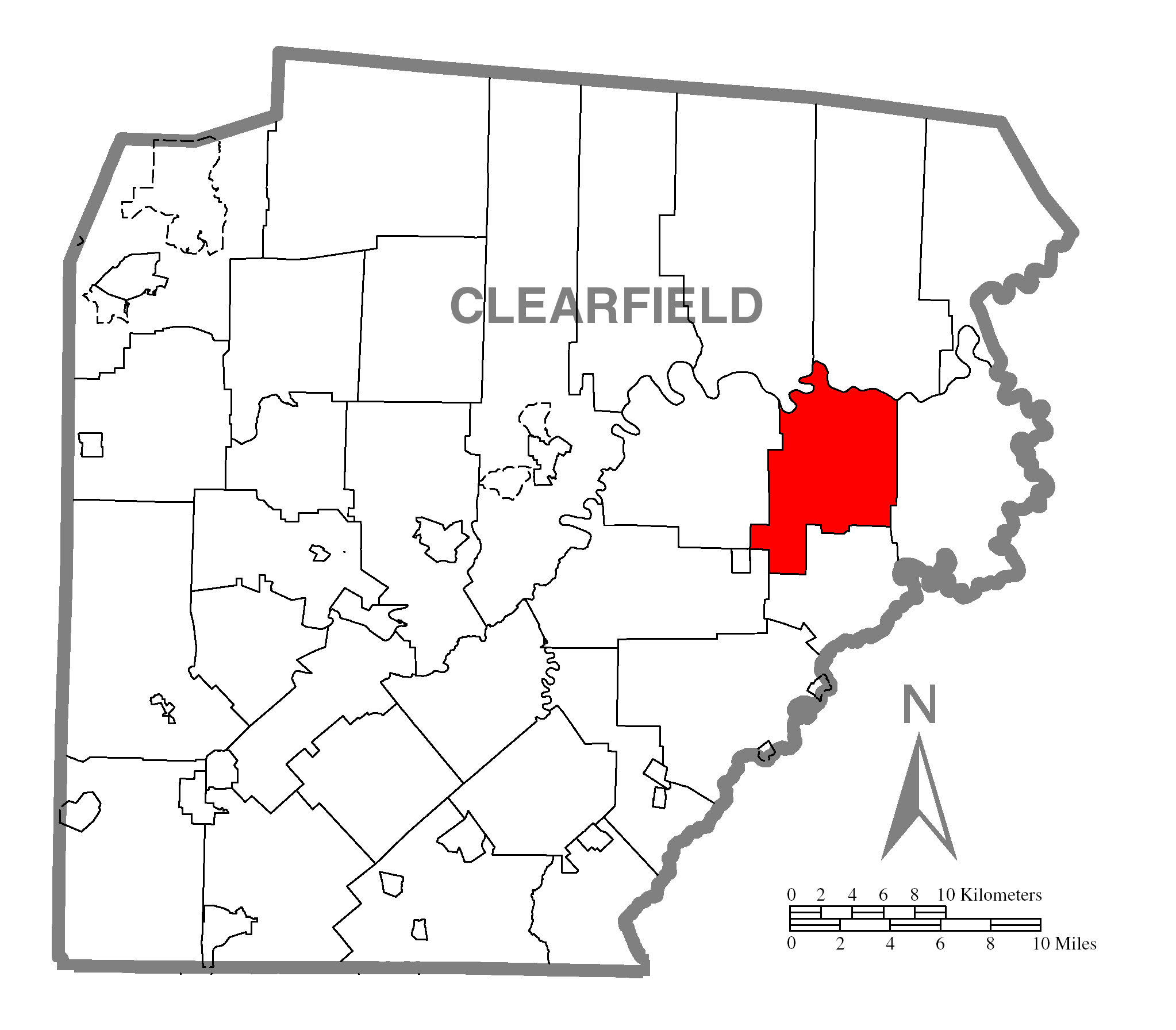
- Map of Clearfield County, Pennsylvania highlighting Graham Township

- Map of Clearfield County, Pennsylvania
- Country: United States
- State: Pennsylvania
- County: Clearfield
- Settled: 1822
- Incorporated: 1856

Area
  - Total: 29.93 sq mi (77.53 km^{2})
  - Land: 29.71 sq mi (76.94 km^{2})
  - Water: 0.23 sq mi (0.59 km^{2})

Population (2020)
  - Total: 1,329 ▼
  - Estimate (2022): 1,318 ▼
  - Density: 46.0/sq mi (17.78/km^{2})
- Time zone: UTC-5 (Eastern (EST))
  - Summer (DST): UTC-4 (EDT)
- Area code: 814
- FIPS code: 42-033-30272

Graham Township is a township in Clearfield County, Pennsylvania, United States. The population was 1,329 at the time of the 2020 census.

The township is located approximately 87.9 miles (141 km) northwest of the state capitol, Harrisburg.

== Geography ==
According to the United States Census Bureau, the township has a total area of 29.93 square miles (77.5 km^{2}), of which 29.71 square miles (76.9 km^{2}) is land and 0.23 square miles (0.60 km^{2}) (0.77%) is water.

== Communities ==
- Fairview
- Kylertown (partially)
- Palestine
- Sington
- Morrisdale

== Demographics ==
Historical population
| Census | Pop. | Note | %± |
|---|---|---|---|
| 2000 | 1,236 | | — |
| 2010 | 1,383 | | 11.9% |
| 2020 | 1,329 | | −3.9% |
| 2022 (est.) | 1,318 | | −0.8% |
U.S. Decennial Census

As of the census of 2000, there were 1,236 people, 463 households, and 375 families residing in the township.

The population density was 40.9 inhabitants per square mile (15.8/km^{2}). There were 549 housing units at an average density of 18.2/sq mi (7.0/km^{2}).

The racial makeup of the township was 98.46% White, 0.40% Native American, 0.08% from other races, and 1.05% from two or more races. Hispanic or Latino of any race were 0.16% of the population.

There were 463 households, out of which 30.9% had children under the age of eighteen living with them; 67.8% were married couples living together, 8.9% had a female householder with no husband present, and 18.8% were non-families. 13.6% of all households were made up of individuals, and 6.5% had someone living alone who was sixty-five years of age or older.

The average household size was 2.67 and the average family size was 2.91.

In the township the population was spread out, with 22.5% under the age of eighteen, 6.8% from eighteen to twenty-four, 29.7% from twenty-five to forty-four, 29.2% from forty-five to sixty-four, and 11.8% who were sixty-five years of age or older. The median age was thirty-nine years.

For every one hundred females, there were 104.6 males. For every one hundred females who were aged eighteen or older, there were 99.6 males.

The median income for a household in the township was $37,604, and the median income for a family was $40,385. Males had a median income of $30,926 compared with that of $22,560 for females.

The per capita income for the township was $15,950.

Roughly 6.0% of families and 6.7% of the population were living below the poverty line, including 8.3% of those who were under the age of eighteen and 2.3% of those who were aged sixty-five or older.

== Education ==
Students in Graham Township attend schools in the West Branch Area School District.
