= Keith Keating =

American business executive and writer

- Education: State University of New York (BA); City University of New York (MBA); University of Pennsylvania (MEd, EdD)
- Occupations: Business executive Writer
- Employer: BDO Canada
- Known for: The Trusted Learning Advisor (2023); Hidden Value (2025)
- Website: keithkeating.com

Keith Keating is an American business executive and writer. He is a lecturer at the University of Pennsylvania's Graduate School of Education and also works as an executive at BDO Canada. Previously, Keating was employed at McKinsey & Company, GP Strategies Corporation, and General Motors.

His books include The Trusted Learning Advisor (2023) and Hidden Value (2025).

== Early life and education ==
Keating grew up in a military family and spent his childhood in Germany, South Korea, and the United States. His family settled in the US when he was approximately fourteen years old. He did not complete high school and left in 10th grade, although he went on to attain a university education afterwards.

Keating earned a Bachelor's degree from the State University of New York. Afterwards, he earned a Master of Business Administration (MBA) from the City University of New York. He then earned a Master of Education (MEd) from the University of Pennsylvania's Graduate School of Education. In 2022, he earned a Doctor of Education (EdD) with distinction from the same institution. His doctoral dissertation examined the beliefs of chief financial officers regarding organizational learning investment.

== Career ==
Keating began his career in 2001 as a Senior Trainer and Analyst at McKinsey & Company. He subsequently worked at Hearst Magazine and GP Strategies Corporation, which worked with companies such as HSBC and General Motors. In addition, Keating served as Head of the Global Learning Network at General Motors.

Afterwards, Keating became the Senior Vice President and Chief Learning Officer at Archwell Holdings, where he established the Archwell Academy, the organization's internal learning institution. He then joined BDO Canada as its first Chief Learning and Development Officer (CLDO).

Keating has given talks at the Training Industry Conference and Expo (TICE) held at Raleigh, North Carolina in June 2024, as well as the 2025 DevLearn Conference and Expo in Las Vegas. In 2026, Keating was one of the hosts of the Learning Leadership Conference, which was held in Las Vegas from November 2–3, 2026. He has presented at conferences organized by AICPA & CIMA, the Life Sciences Trainers & Educators Network (LTEN), the Association for Talent Development (ATD), and the Canada School of Public Service.

Keating has worked with companies and institutions such as Intuit, PepsiCo, Great American Insurance Group, and Yale University.

He also currently serves as a lecturer in the Chief Learning Officer (CLO) Executive Doctoral Program at the University of Pennsylvania's Graduate School of Education.

== Books ==
Keating's books include The Trusted Learning Advisor (2023) and Hidden Value (2025). The Trusted Learning Advisor (2023), which was published by Kogan Page, won a 2023 Goody Business Book Award, and was a Distinguished Favorite in the NYC Big Book Awards (2024). It was also a finalist in the Next Generation Indie Book Awards (2025).

Hidden Value: How to Reveal the Impact of Organizational Learning was published in June 2025. The book received a 2025 International Business Book Award and a 2025 Goody Business Book Award for Leadership, as well as a silver medal at the Axiom Business Book Awards (2026).

== Filmography ==
Keating was a dancer in the music video for Christina Aguilera's "Not Myself Tonight" (2010), directed by Hype Williams.

== See also ==
- BDO Global
- Training and development
