= John Keating (land developer) =

Baron John Keating
- John Keating, undated, from the biography by his great-grandson
- Born: 20 September 1760; Ireland
- Died: 19 May 1856 (aged 95); Philadelphia
- Occupations: Soldier, land developer
- Known for: land development

John Keating was born in Ireland in 1760, and raised in France. He joined the French Army, resigning in face of the Haitian and French revolutions to settle in Philadelphia. He spent the rest of his long life as a land agent and manager for the settlement of inland Pennsylvania, known for competence, honesty, and care for the settlers.

== Early life ==
John Keating was born in 1760 to Valentine Keating, a Catholic Irish gentleman educated in France. In 1766, having overcome trumped-up charges of treason, and still facing the severe disadvantages of the penal laws against Catholics, the family moved to France and settled in Poitiers. In recognition of his noble ancestry, Valentine was granted letters patent of nobility by Louis XV. John, with his twin brother William, was educated at the English College, Douai. After graduating, he and William were both granted a commission in Walsh's regiment, in which their elder brother Thomas was already serving.

== Military career ==
The regiment sailed in 1780 for the Caribbean, taking the British garrison of Sint Eustatius by surprise. In 1783 the Antilles War ended and the regiment returned to France. In 1788 it was sent to Mauritius; John and William set out on the frigate Penelope, which was wrecked on the Cape of Good Hope with the loss of thirty-six men. The brothers arrived safely in Mauritius and spent a year there, where William resigned from the army to marry. In 1789 the regiment sailed for France; it was forced to make land in Martinique, where it learned of the French Revolution and took the cockade of France. They were then garrisoned in Brittany, subject to "the dictates and caprices of demagogues". By commission dated 27 November 1791, John was granted the Cross of St. Louis, and shortly afterwards he sailed with the regiment for Saint-Domingue, then in the throes of the Haitian Revolution. An attempted coup against the revolutionary Commissioners failed when the soldiery sided with the Commissioners and forced the other officers to embark for France. John was required by the 92nd Regiment and the Commissioner Sonthonax to take temporary command of the regiment. In despair at the prospects for Saint-Domingue, he obtained permission to leave, and on Christmas Eve 1792 arrived in Philadelphia with $280 and two letters of introduction, one from Sonthonax to De la Forest, French consul in Philadelphia, and one from the Vicomte de Rochambeau to General George Washington.

== Land development and management ==
He soon made acquaintance with the French emigre community in Philadelphia, among whom were two who had been included in a large land development scheme started by Robert Morris and John Nicholson. This Asylum Project attracted French settlers to an agricultural life on the north bank of the Susquehanna River, but most of them preferred in due course to return to France. John was mentioned by De la Rochefoucauld as a man of uncommon merit, distinguished abilities, extraordinary virtue, and invincible disinterestedness. On 20 January 1795 he became a citizen of the United States, and on 11 December 1797 he married Eulalia Deschapelles, whose father had been a planter in Saint-Domingue until the Haitian Revolution. They had three children, William, John, and Eulalie, and also adopted Jerome, the son of his brother William. Jerome and Eulalie later married each other.

In 1797 the Asylum Company fell into financial trouble and, with John's original backers, ultimately fell into ruin. However, his reputation was by then such that émigrés would purchase title to undeveloped land, vest it in him, and leave the management entirely to his judgement. He became closely involved with the Ceres Company, which through him purchased 297,428 acres of land in and around modern McKean, Potter, and Clearfield Counties. He was for many years the manager, and one of three trustees, for the owners of the company, which was eventually wound up by his grandson in 1884 after realising upwards of a million dollars. Its financial success was associated with Keating's "watchful care... his sympathy with... the settlers", and his "readiness to help in every possible way partook more of the character of the care of a father over his children than a capitalist over a business enterprise." He lived and died a devout Catholic, but his endowments included gifts of land for churches of other denominations, schools, and government buildings. Four Keating Townships, in McKean, Potter, and Clinton Counties, Pennsylvania are named after him.

Some four years after his marriage, when he was living in Wilmington, a dispute arose between the directors of the Ceres Company. Despite his own intimate connection with the disagreement, Keating was asked by both sides to travel to Europe to arbitrate, which he did to the satisfaction of all parties.

== Family life ==
John's wife Eulalie died on 4 August 1803, while he was on a business trip. His diary for the rest of his long life was devoted almost entirely to recollections of her, and he expired gazing at her picture.

His accomplished sons predeceased him. Jerome also died young, after he and Eulalie had had two sons and a daughter. Eulalie later became a nun and survived her father. William made original observations from which he inferred the former existence of an immense intra-continental lake, now accepted as Lake Agassiz.

The French title of Baron devolved upon him on the death of his elder brother; he never assumed it, but was affectionately known as "the old Baron".

== Sources ==
John Keating and his forbears (1918) Author: Keating, John Percy, 1855–1920. Reprinted from the Records of the American Catholic Historical Society Vol. XXIX No. 4 December 1918. Identifier-ark: ark:/13960/t6f19440p https://archive.org/details/johnkeatinghisfo00keat The author was a great-grandson of John. Accessed 10 July 2011 . Who's Who in Potter County, Brief Biographies of Many of the Prominent Residents of Potter County, Pennsylvania and a Brief Review of the History of Potter County, Marie Schadenberger and Sylvia Wilson, F. A. Owen Pub. Co., Dansville, NY; Copyright 1947. Transcribed & Submitted by Sheri D. Graves. http://www.pa-roots.com/potter/history/whoswho.html. accessed 11 July 2011

For date of death: http://viaf.org/processed/LC%7Cn%20%2089650142, referring to National Union Catalog of Manuscript Collections data from Penn. Hist. and Museum Comm. for Keating Land Company. Papers, 1814–1918.
