= Cooper Township, Clearfield County, Pennsylvania =

Township in Pennsylvania, US

Coordinates: 41°02′30″N 78°04′59″W

- Township
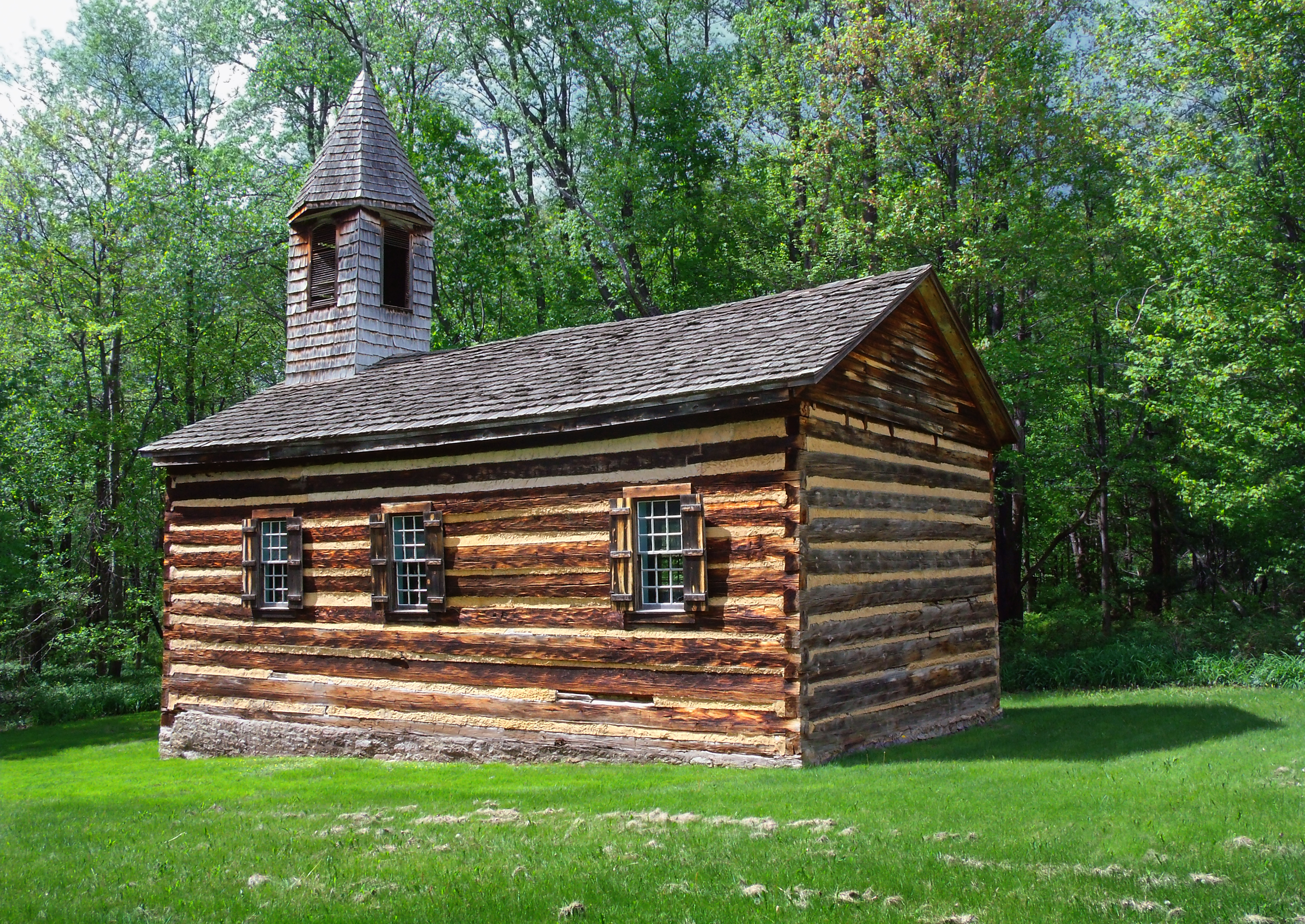
- Saint Severin Roman Catholic Church

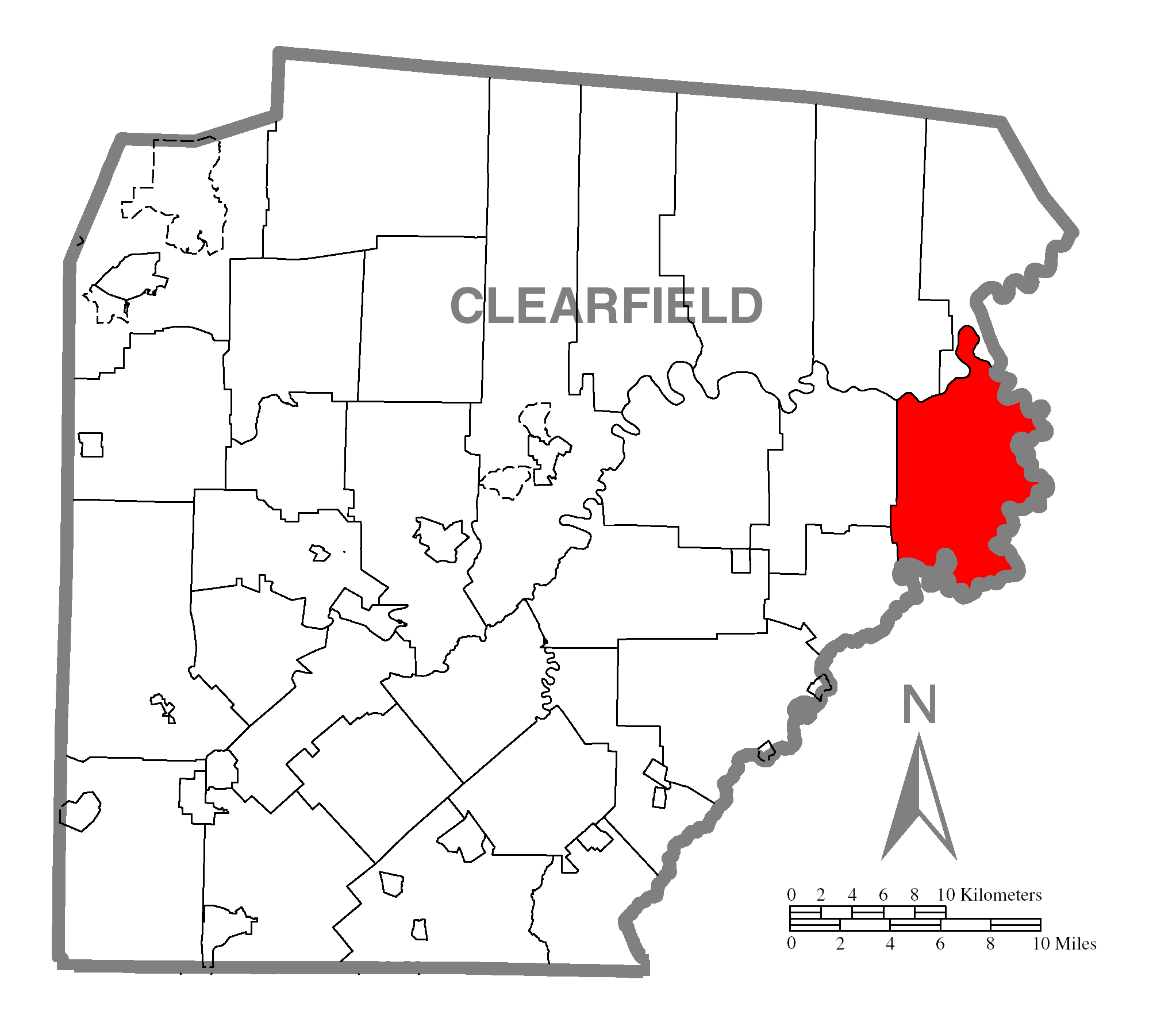
- Map of Clearfield County, Pennsylvania highlighting Cooper Township

- Map of Clearfield County, Pennsylvania
- Country: United States
- State: Pennsylvania
- County: Clearfield
- Settled: 1828
- Incorporated: 1884

Area
  - Total: 41.20 sq mi (106.72 km^{2})
  - Land: 40.89 sq mi (105.90 km^{2})
  - Water: 0.32 sq mi (0.82 km^{2})

Population (2020)
  - Total: 2,593 ▼
  - Estimate (2022): 2,562 ▼
  - Density: 64.6/sq mi (24.94/km^{2})
- Time zone: UTC-5 (Eastern (EST))
  - Summer (DST): UTC-4 (EDT)
- Area code: 814
- FIPS code: 42-033-16040

Cooper Township is a township in Clearfield County, Pennsylvania, United States. The population was 2,593 at the 2020 census.

== Geography ==
According to the United States Census Bureau, the township has a total area of 40.9 square miles (106 km^{2}), of which 40.6 square miles (105 km^{2}) or 99.41% is land and 0.2 square miles (0.52 km^{2}) or 0.59% is water.

== Communities ==
- Cooper Settlement
- Drain Lick
- Drifting
- Forest
- Grassflat
- Huckenberry
- Kylertown
- Lanse
- Munson
- Peale - ghost town
- Pleasant Hill
- Sylvan Grove - unincorporated community
- Winburne

== Demographics ==
Historical population
| Census | Pop. | Note | %± |
|---|---|---|---|
| 1970 | 2,585 | | — |
| 1980 | 2,819 | | 9.1% |
| 1990 | 2,590 | | −8.1% |
| 2000 | 2,731 | | 5.4% |
| 2010 | 2,704 | | −1.0% |
| 2020 | 2,593 | | −4.1% |
| 2022 (est.) | 2,562 | | −1.2% |
U.S. Decennial Census

As of the census of 2000, there were 2,731 people, 1,056 households, and 786 families residing in the township. The population density was 67.2 inhabitants per square mile (25.9/km^{2}). There were 1,211 housing units at an average density of 29.8 per square mile (11.5/km^{2}). The racial makeup of the township was 99.71% White, 0.04% Native American, 0.11% Asian, and 0.15% from two or more races. Hispanic or Latino of any race were 0.26% of the population.

There were 1,056 households, out of which 34.8% had children under the age of 18 living with them, 59.8% were married couples living together, 10.1% had a female householder with no husband present, and 25.5% were non-families. 22.6% of all households were made up of individuals, and 11.8% had someone living alone who was 65 years of age or older. The average household size was 2.58 and the average family size was 3.03.

In the township the population was spread out, with 25.2% under the age of 18, 5.4% from 18 to 24, 31.4% from 25 to 44, 22.8% from 45 to 64, and 15.1% who were 65 years of age or older. The median age was 38 years. For every 100 females, there were 96.5 males. For every 100 females age 18 and over, there were 90.8 males.

The median income for a household in the township was $34,073, and the median income for a family was $38,704. Males had a median income of $27,309 versus $22,330 for females. The per capita income for the township was $16,161. About 7.1% of families and 8.8% of the population were below the poverty line, including 11.9% of those under age 18 and 10.8% of those age 65 or over.

== Education ==
Students who reside in Cooper Township attend schools in the West Branch Area School District.
