= Keating Supercars =

Sports car manufacturer

- Industry: Automobiles
- Founded: 2006
- Founder: Anthony Keating
- Defunct: 31 May 2021
- Headquarters: Bolton, England, United Kingdom
- Website: Official page

Keating Supercars was a low-volume kit car manufacturer based in Bolton, England. They made their debut in July 2006 with the launch of the TKR. They built four cars since its launch, the SKR, TKR, ZKR and the Bolt. At the racing car show, Autosport International 2016, Keating Supercars unveiled a road version of the Bolt to be sold in the US. Anthony Keating is the founder and CEO of Keating Supercars and designer of the Keating SKR, TKR and ZKR. Keating was born in Manchester, UK and took a course at the Automobile Engineering institute at the University of Bolton, UK. Keating graduated with an MBA in Business in 2012 and, together with students from the University of Bolton, hopes to build and make the Keating Bolt, the world's fastest production car, reaching more than 300 miles per hour. Keating Supercars planned to sell around 30 cars a year.

The company was liquidated on May, 31 2021.

== Keating Supercars Models ==
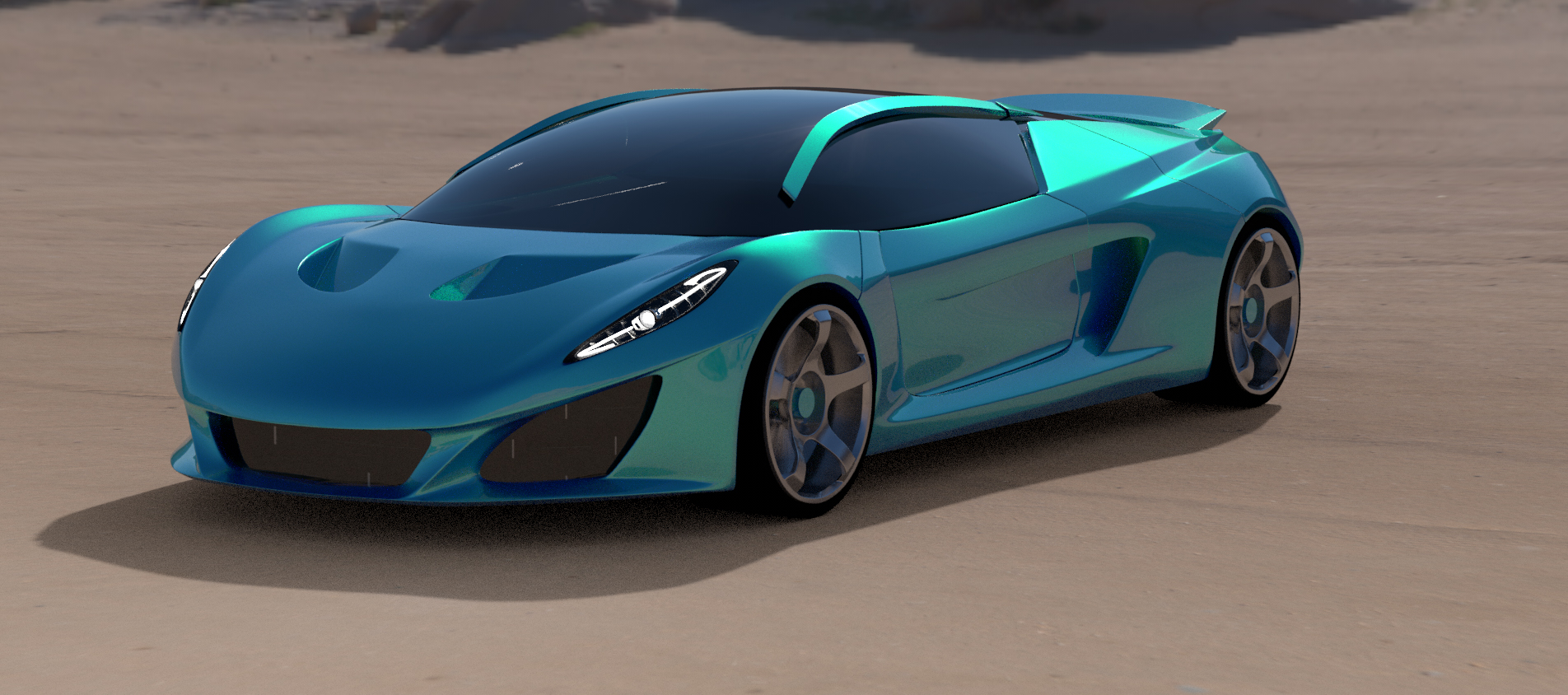
Keating Berus (3D render)

=== Keating Berus ===
The Berus was unveiled at the Top Marques Monaco show in April 2017. Taking its name from the venomous snake Vipera berus, the Berus comes in two versions. With an alleged top speed of 230 mph+ and acceleration from 0-60 mph in 2.4 seconds, the V8 Berus is the latest addition to the Keating range. There is also the Electric Berus available with 201 to 402 hp (150 to 300 kW) and 1,054 lb⋅ft (1,429 N⋅m) of torque.

=== Keating Bolt ===
The Bolt was launched in 2013, designed to outperform supercar competition using lightweight materials to reduce the power to weight ratio, but aiming to increase the car's performance figures to a top speed of 340 mph.

The Bolt's engine design is based on a Chevrolet V8, but almost all the other components are engineered by Keating Supercars and other UK companies.

=== Keating TKR ===
In 2008, The TKR was built primarily for competition and track use. It was soon followed by the SKR, based on the TKR, but designed as a road car. In October 2009 the Keating TKR, a twin turbo mid-engine supercar boasting 2,500 hp (1,864 kW) allegedly hit 260.1 mph on a dry lake bed at Salt Lake Flats in California. However, the test run was deemed unofficial as the car broke down before it could complete the return run in the opposite direction on the lake bed; in addition the vehicle still wouldn't have qualified as it was modified and didn't abide by the rule that it must be commercially available. In 2010 the TKR was to attempt to break the blind land speed record, until the car crashed on a test run and did not attempt this record.

=== Keating SKR ===
The Keating SKR appeared at the British Motor Show in 2006..

=== Keating ZKR ===
In April 2011, the Keating ZKR was unveiled at the "Monaco Top Marques show" held at the Grimaldi Forum, Monaco. Keating claimed the ZKR produces 650 hp (485 kW) and could reach 60 mph in 3.6 seconds.
