= Keating Township, Pennsylvania =

Keating Township is the name of some places in the U.S. state of Pennsylvania:

- Keating Township, McKean County, Pennsylvania
- Keating Township, Potter County, Pennsylvania

== See also ==
- East Keating Township, Clinton County, Pennsylvania
- West Keating Township, Pennsylvania
