= Michael Keating =

Michael, Mike or Mickey Keating may refer to:

== Politics ==
- Michael Keating (Irish politician) (born 1946), Fine Gael then Progressive Democrats TD from Dublin
- Michael Keating (Manitoba politician)
- Michael Keating (political scientist) (born 1950)
- Michael Keating (public servant) (born 1940), senior Australian public servant
- Michael Keating (UN official) (born 1959), former Special Representative of the Secretary General, United Nations Assistance Mission in Somalia (UNSOM)

== Sports ==
- Michael Keating (hurler) (born 1944), Irish hurling manager and former player
- Mickey Keating (athlete) (1931–2004), Canadian ice hockey player
- Mike Keating (ice hockey) (born 1957), Canadian ice hockey player

== Others ==
- Michael Keating (actor) (1947–2026), British actor
- Mickey Keating (director) (born 1990/1991), American film director
- Michael Keating (priest) (1793–1877), Irish Anglican priest
