= Fred Keating =

Fred Keating may refer to:

- Frederick Keating (1859–1928), Catholic bishop
- Fred Keating (magician) (1901–1961), American magician and film actor
- Fred Keating (actor) (born 1949), Canadian-American television and film actor
