= Sylvan Grove, Pennsylvania =

Unincorporated community in Pennsylvania, US

- Unincorporated community
- Location within Pennsylvania
- Coordinates: 41°01′46″N 78°09′16″W
- Country: United States
- State: Pennsylvania
- County: Clearfield
- Elevation: 1,525 ft (465 m)
- Time zone: Eastern (EST)
  - Summer (DST): EDT

Sylvan Grove is an unincorporated community in Cooper Township in Clearfield County, Pennsylvania, United States. It appears on the Frenchville U.S. Geological Survey Map. It is a small farming community originally called Hickory Bottom. Central to the history of Sylvan Grove is the Sylvan Grove Church and Cemetery.

== History ==
=== Sylvan Grove Church and Cemetery ===
Located north of Kylertown on Church Hill Road off of State Route 1011, Sylvan Grove Church and Cemetery remains today as a testament of the faith of the earliest settlers in this area. The church, originally constructed in 1870 for $2010.00, was built on land owned by John and Wealthy Johnson Hoover, and deeded to the Trustees of the Methodist-Episcopal Church. At that time the Trustees were Robert Daugherty, George Hess, David Aldrich, Samuel Hoover, and John Hoover. This building was dedicated on June 25, 1871.

This was actually the second church built in this area. The first church was a log building made in 1850, making it the very first church in what was to become Cooper Township. It was across the road from where the current church stands today. The log building church was constructed on land purchased by two of the Hoover brothers, Samuel and John, from Edward and David Gratz. The Hoover brothers then deeded an acre of this land as the building site to the Morris Township School District and the log building was used for both school and church purposes. The founding fathers of the original log church were all four of the Hoover brothers (John and Samuel, George and Jerimiah) as well as Robert Daugherty and George Hess.
