= Keating model =

In physics, The Keating Model is a model that theoretical physicist Patrick N. Keating introduced in 1966 to describe forces induced on neighboring atoms when one atom moves in a solid.

The term most often applies to the forces on first- and second-nearest neighboring atoms that arise when an atom is moved in tetrahedrally-bonded solids, such as diamond, silicon, germanium, and a number of other covalent crystals with the diamond or zinc blende structures.

Crystalline solids generally consist of an ordered array of interconnected atoms, generated by repetition of a unit cell in three dimensions, and are of two extreme types—ionic crystals, and covalent crystals. Others are intermediate: partly ionic and partly covalent. Ionic crystals are made up of quite different ions, such as Na^{+} and Cl^{−} in common salt, for example, while covalent crystals such as diamond are made up of atoms that share electrons in a covalent bond.

In either case, attractive and repulsive forces resist moving an atom/ion or a set of them from their equilibrium positions, thus giving solids their rigidity against compressive, tensile, and shear stresses. The nature and strength of these forces is important for the scientific understanding of solids since they determine the way the solid responds to these stresses (elastic constants), the velocity of sound waves in it, its infra-red absorption, and many other properties.

== Description ==
The Keating model is the result of a general method proposed to ensure that the elastic strain energy satisfies the requirement that it is invariant under a simple rotation of the crystal, without deformation. It is a formalism for the way adjacent and close-by atoms respond when one or more atoms move in covalently bonded crystals. It is also a specific parameterization of this response for diamond, silicon, and germanium. (see the article listed under "Further Reading").

The general method is applicable for small atomic displacements to all crystal structures. It has been extended by P. N. Keating to include anharmonic effects (and calculate third-order elastic constants), and many other researchers have extended it to include forces between the covalent bonds, and augment it in other ways.

The key paper that introduced the model was one of the 50 highest-impact papers over a century of Physical Review publications ). The model has been, and is, used by many research scientists for calculating elastic constants, lattice dynamics, band structure, dislocation strains, atomic configurations at surfaces and interfaces, and other purposes for a wide range of solids, including amorphous (i.e., non-crystalline) materials.
