= Colonnella =

- Comune
- Comune di Colonnella
- Location within Italy Location within Abruzzo
- Coordinates: 42°52′N 13°52′E
- Country: Italy
- Region: Abruzzo
- Province: Teramo (TE)
- Frazioni: Civita, San Giovanni, San Martino, Vallecupa, Vibrata

Area
  - Total: 21 km^{2} (8.1 sq mi)
- Elevation: 303 m (994 ft)

Population (1 January 2007)
  - Total: 3,495
  - Density: 170/km^{2} (430/sq mi)
- Demonym: Collonnellesi
- Time zone: UTC+1 (CET)
  - Summer (DST): UTC+2 (CEST)
- Postal code: 64010
- Dialing code: 0861
- ISTAT code: 067019
- Patron saint: San Michele
- Saint day: 8 May
- Website: Official website

Colonnella is a comune in the province of Teramo in the Abruzzo region of eastern Italy. It belongs to the Unione dei Comuni Città Territorio-Val Vibrata, an inter-municipal body that groups Colonnella with eleven neighboring towns.

== Geography ==
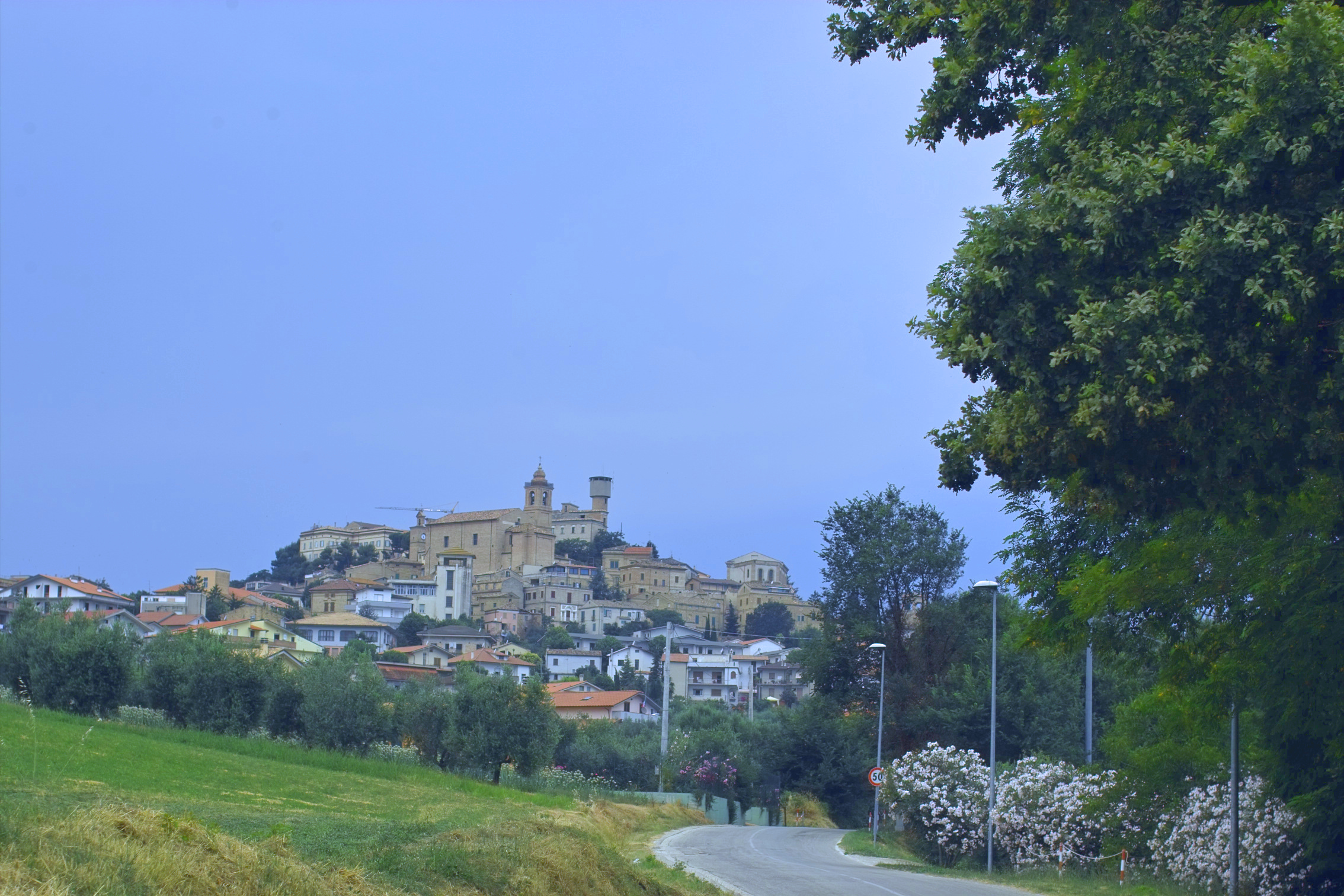
Colonnella as seen from the Via Roma

Colonnella is located in the Val Vibrata (Valley of the Vibrata River). To the north it is bordered by the municipality of Monteprandone in the Marche region, to the east by the municipality of Martinsicuro, to the south by Alba Adriatica, and to the west by the municipalities of Controguerra and Corropoli.

Colonnella is subdivided into nine districts: the Centro capoluogo, Contrada Civita, Contrada Giardino, Contrada Riomoro, Contrada San Giovanni, Contrada San Martino, Contrada Sant'Angelo, Contrada Vallecupa, Contrada Vibrata, and Contrada Isola.

Colonnella as described in the early 19th century:

"Colonnella, is a land in Abruzzo Ultra, in the province of Teramo; in the diocese of Campli. It [is] in the Duchy of Atri, which is part of the Kingdom, seen high in the hills, two miles away from the sea, and eighteen from the city of Teramo. The air you breathe is very healthy and enjoys a surprising horizon, dominating by much of the Papal States (le Marche)."

== History ==
=== Antiquity, Roman Period and the Early Middle Ages ===
According to Pliny the Elder in his Natural Historia, in ancient times, in the territory of greater Colonnella, stood the Liburnic city of Truentum, now believed to be in the current Colle della Civita. Archaeological traces of the Roman period are scattered throughout the territory of Colonnella and the best preserved among them are ancient Roman Cisterns, Cincolà and Ricci.

After the western Roman Empire came under the rule of the eastern Roman Empire beginning in 476 CE, first with Odoacer and then under the Ostrogoths, the Colonnella area continued to be part of the Praetorian prefecture of Italy. In 535, the Roman emperor Justinian I invaded Italy as part of a war of re-conquest of the west. It was a brutal war, and Truentum suffered the dismantling of the port and the destruction of the city. The decimated people took refuge in the surrounding hills of the ancient city. From this, Colonnella was born several decades later, after the Lombards invaded now Byzantine Italy.

=== Middle Ages ===
Around 580, the area was invaded by the Lombards. The survivors of Truentum, which was now definitively abandoned, rebuilt on the hill of the current hamlet of the Civita, a settlement called Civitas Tomacchiara and, at the mouth of the Tronto, Torri a Tronto. However, the incursions and insecurity of those times pushed the populations of the two villages increasingly inland; and, coming together at the highest point of the surrounding hills, founded Colonnella. The city arose from the encastling of these two populations: that of the parish of San Biagio, formerly occupying the easternmost part of the settlement, and that of Saints Cipriano and Giustina, the only parish that survives today. The city's name appears to derive from the Latin columella (small column) and not from the later feudal lord Guillame Colonnella mentioned in the Catalogus Baronum of 1047. Colonnella was included by the Lombards in the gastaldate, then county, of Aprutium, an administrative subdivision of the Duchy of Spoleto.

Later, the Lombards were defeated by the Franks, but the administration of the area was not radically altered. This area was the southernmost part of the Frankish Kingdom and somewhat autonomous. From this period dates the first documentation of the name: in the Chronicon Farfense, a collection of acts and documents of the abbey of Farfa (from the year 705 to 1100) – as Curtem S. Maria in "Colunnellae" and later as Curtem de "Colunnella", cited in documents dated from 936 to 962.

In the late Eleventh Century, the Normans, who had conquered southern Italy, began penetrating north into Aprutium. By 1078 they had reached the Tronto River, where, under the threat of excommunication, they stopped and thus were able to bring Colonnella into the Norman sphere. After 1131, Colonnella became part of the Kingdom of Sicily, marking a border (marca) that would remain basically unchanged until the 1861 unification of Italy. In the Catalogus baronum of 1167-1168 it is mentioned as a fief belonging to two Norman barons who take their name from it: William Colonnellus and his brother James. From the Catalogus baronum, the first census of the Kingdom of Naples by the Normans, it appears that the fief of Colonnella was required to provide the King, to equip and maintain, an armigere (with its retinue) for every 24 households. It is deduced that at the time the village had about 220 inhabitants.

From then on, Colonnella follows the general history of the Kingdom of Naples, coming under the French Angevins, when in 1279 Colonnella was given in fief to Amelio de Agoto Courban, along with lands in Nereto, Gabiano, Torri a Tronto, and Montorio a mare. Colonnella was designated as a Passo, or fixed customs place (1282), being on the border of the Kingdom, in the province Ultra flumen Piscaria (Abruzzo Ultra). Colonnella was often called Castrum Colonnellae or Civitas Tomacchiara. Then, King Charles III of Naples, to punish Baron Amelio de Agoto III for supporting the king's rival Louis I of Anjou, took Colonnella and de Agoto's other fiefs in favor of the Crown, and sold them in 1385 to the free municipality of Ascoli. Colonnella would remain part of the Ascoli domain for about 150 years.

=== Renaissance and early modern age ===
The Kingdom of Naples came to be ruled directly by the Spanish monarchy in the early 16th Century. In 1535, Charles V, for rebellion committed by the Ascolani, granted the land of Colonnella to Benedetto Rosales. Despite the return of Colonnella to the Kingdom, from the ecclesiastical point of view it still belonged to the Diocese of Fermo in the Papal States. In 1602, Colonnella was purchased by Andrea Matteo Acquaviva, Duke of Atri and Prince of Caserta, and in 1640 it was sold to Diana di Capua. A few years later, it returned to the Acquavivas which, by acquiring many other villages of the Val Vibrata, expanded the Duchy of Atri.

=== Modern age ===
The Kingdom of Naples came to be ruled by a cadet branch of the Spanish Bourbon monarchy. With the extinction of the House of Acquaviva, in 1775, the fiefdom passed to Atri, under the direct control of the Kingdom. At the end of the 18th century, the Kingdom was also taken with the ideas of the French Revolution; from 18 June 1796, the fortifications on the Tronto, centered on Civitella of which Colonnella was a center, was strengthened to resist the advance of French troops. However, the French overwhelmed the defenses and occupied the Val Vibrata until Colonnella's populace revolted. The French boat bridge on the Tronto was destroyed, guerrilla operations were undertaken, and French soldiers captured and imprisoned. With the arrival, however, of the French reinforcements, Colonnella was retaken and looted. In retaliation the seat of government was set on fire, with the loss of the public archive.

In 1806 King Ferdinand IV of Naples fled to Sicily and the French conquered Teramo and the fortress of Civitella del Tronto. Napoleon installed his brother Joseph Bonaparte and then his brother-in-law Joachim Murat on the throne of Naples; the latter immediately issued a series of reforms aimed at modernizing the state.

The French presence was opposed by brigands under the leadership of the Ciammarichella brothers. They acted as supporters of King Ferdinand IV against the French. The insorgenti, as they were called, attacked Colonnella and again plundered it. After order was restored and the insurgents defeated, the few survivors sheltered in the neighboring Papal States and nearby mountains. Among the brigands were the Sciabolone, Piceno, the band of Nicomì, and the Ciammarichella brothers.

After the Congress of Vienna, in 1816 Colonnella was returned to the cadet Bourbon kingdom and administratively included in the Abruzzo Ulteriore Primo, corresponding to the present province of Teramo to the Pescara River. The kingdoms of Naples and Sicily (Kingdom of the Two Sicilies) were reunited until the landing of Giuseppe Garibaldi in Sicily and the consequential conquest of Naples, which took place on September 8, 1860.

Colonnella participated in the plebiscite of October 21, 1860, which proposed the annexation of the Kingdom of the Two Sicilies to the Kingdom of Sardinia (in the province of Teramo there were 15,113 "yes" and only 165 "no" votes). The Kingdom of Sardinia became the Kingdom of Italy in 1861. At the first census of the new Kingdom of Italy, the population of Colonnella amounted to 3,809 inhabitants, of whom 55 were eligible voters.

In 1862, the Commune of Colonnella began to address several centuries-old problems:

- viability of the Tronto, starting with a bridge to replace the "boat bridge";
- public education buildings;
- the modernization of roads; and
- city water supply.

A restoration of the historic center began in 1867, including demolishing the old church of San Leopardo and transferring religious services to the parish church of Saints Cipriano and Giustina. The construction of the "New Road", (currently Via Belvedere), allowed good access to the main square of the village. At the same time (1873) the first public oil lighting system was installed, replaced by gas in 1900, and finally electrification in 1913.

The area suffered destruction during the Second World War, especially in the frazione of Martinsicuro, which suffered repeated bombing of the two bridges over the Tronto.

With the proclamation of the Republic in 1948 and the subsequent years of the economic boom, the rapid demographic and economic development of the frazione of Martinsicuro led to a rivalry with Colonnella. When the number of inhabitants of Martinsicuro exceeded that of the Colonnella, the situation degenerated until a territorial division was obtained in 1963; Martinsicuro and Villa Rosa were detached from Colonnella to form the Commune of Martinsicuro.

== Places of Interest ==
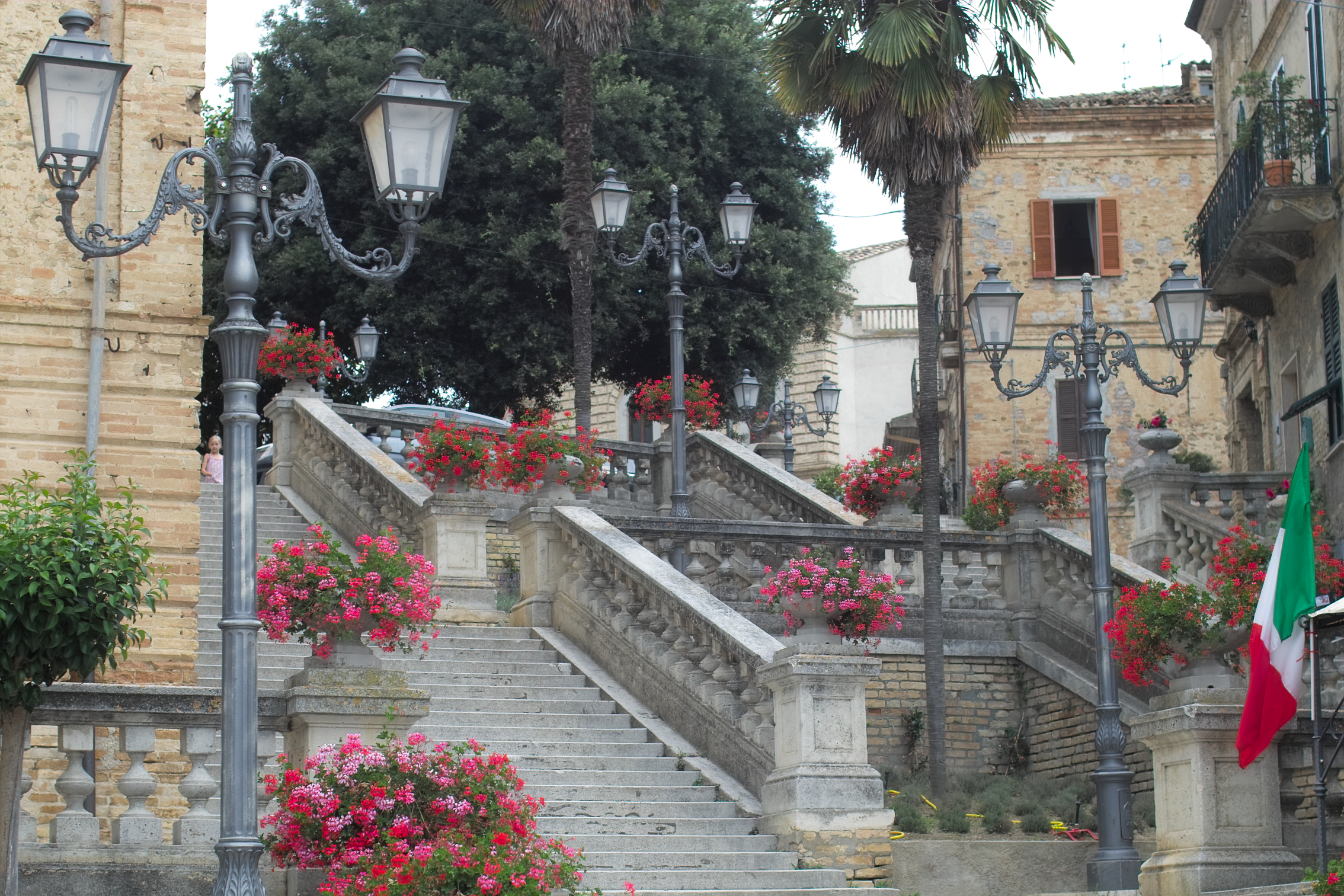
Stairs connecting Via Indipendenza with Chiesa Santi Cipriano e Giustina

The historic center is dominated by the Church and the Clock Tower, see below, and is full of numerous small squares and narrow streets, called "rue" in dialect.

- Church of Saints Cyprinus and Justina (Chiesa dei Santi Cipriano e Giustina): The construction of the church was begun in 1795 by the Swiss architect Pietro Maggi and was concluded, after his death, by his son Gaetano in 1816.
- Clock Tower (Torre dell'Orologio): Although its original erection date is not known, it was probably part of a defensive system of the village. A primitive clock was replaced in 1837. Several bells were installed that had been in the Church of San Leopardo, which had been demolished in 1867.
- Municipal House (Casa Comunale): This dates back to 1841, as a replacement for the structure destroyed during the Napoleonic Period.
- The Staircase (La Scalinata): It is the most characteristic element of the town's architecture and the symbol of Colonnella. It connects Via Roma, at the ancient wash house, with Piazza del Popolo. The upper part, between the square and Via Indipendenza, was built in 1923. The complex that joins Via Indipendenza, Piazza Garibaldi, and Via Roma was built between 1932 and 1933.
- Ancient wash house (Antico lavatoio): Located at the base of La Scalinata, it is a structure dating back to the end of the 19th century.
- War Memorial (Monumento ai Caduti): Located in the center of Piazza Garibaldi, it was dedicated in 1936.
- Palaces (Palazzi): Palazzo Volpi (eighteenth century) is located at the highest point of the town, stands on the ancient city walls, and is visible from all routes to the town; Palazzo Marzi (completed in 1796) overlooks Piazza del Popolo; Palazzo Pardi (dates to the 18th century); and Palazzo Grilli (nineteenth-century) located in Piazza Campo Fiera.
- Roman ruins: Several Roman archaeological finds are in the surrounding area, of which cisterns for collecting water are the main exhibits. The well-preserved Cincolà Cistern, nearly six meters wide and in use until the last century (visible in the San Martino district (contrada) on the Pianaccio hill) and the Ricci Cistern in contrada Vibrata are notable. There are also fountains, which are also probably of Roman origin, such as Fonte Vecchia, in contrada Giardino, and Fonte Ottone, in contrada San Martino.
- The pinciaje, pianciaia, or pinciara: These are 20 pinciaje (plain), or raw earth, houses, a typical dwelling of rural centers until 50 years ago and typical of the Adriatic Abruzzo and Le Marche. Some have been recently restored and others are still used as service rooms and agricultural sheds.
