= Martinsicuro =

- Comune
- Comune di Martinsicuro

- Coat of arms

- Location within Italy Location within Abruzzo
- Coordinates: 42°53′N 13°55′E
- Country: Italy
- Region: Abruzzo
- Province: Teramo (TE)
- Frazioni: Villa Rosa

Government
  - Mayor: Massimo Vagnoni (Progetto Comune)

Area
  - Total: 14.66 km^{2} (5.66 sq mi)
- Elevation: 2 m (6.6 ft)

Population (30 September 2017)
  - Total: 16,020
  - Density: 1,093/km^{2} (2,830/sq mi)
- Demonym: Martinsicuresi
- Time zone: UTC+1 (CET)
  - Summer (DST): UTC+2 (CEST)
- Postal code: 64014
- Dialing code: 0861
- Patron saint: St. Gabriel
- Saint day: 27 February
- Website: Official website

Martinsicuro (former Roman town of Latin: Truentum or Latin: Castrum Truentinum) is a town and comune (municipality) in province of Teramo, Abruzzo, central Italy. It is located on the right of the mouth of Tronto River.

== History ==
Remains of a Bronze Age (10th-9th centuries BC) settlement were found in the communal territory, on a hill overlooking the Tronto river. At the river's mouth existed Truentum, remembered by Roman writer Pliny the Elder as part of the Roman region of Picenum, and attributed to the Liburni tribe. It was noted during the Roman civil wars as one of the centers occupied by Julius Caesar. It is cited by Strabo, Pomponius Mela and Silius Italicus, also reported in the Antonine Itinerary and in the Tabula Peutingeriana. The territories alongside of his river were divided under the reform of Augustus. After the Roman conquest in the 3rd century BC it became a municipium and later was reached by the Via Salaria.

Castrum Truentinum was conquered by the Lombards in the wake of the fall of Fermo in 580, but in the subsequent centuries most of the inhabitants moved to other centres in the mainland. In the 16th century the Spaniards built here two watchtowers, around which a small borough grew.

== Main sights ==
- Tower of Charles V (1547). Since 2009 it has housed an archaeological museum.

== Notable people ==
- Gigliola Staffilani (1966) - Mathematician, professor at Massachusetts Institute of Technology

== Twin towns ==
Martinsicuro is twinned with:

- Puerto de la Cruz, Spain
- Makó, Hungary
