= Keating TKR =

British sports car

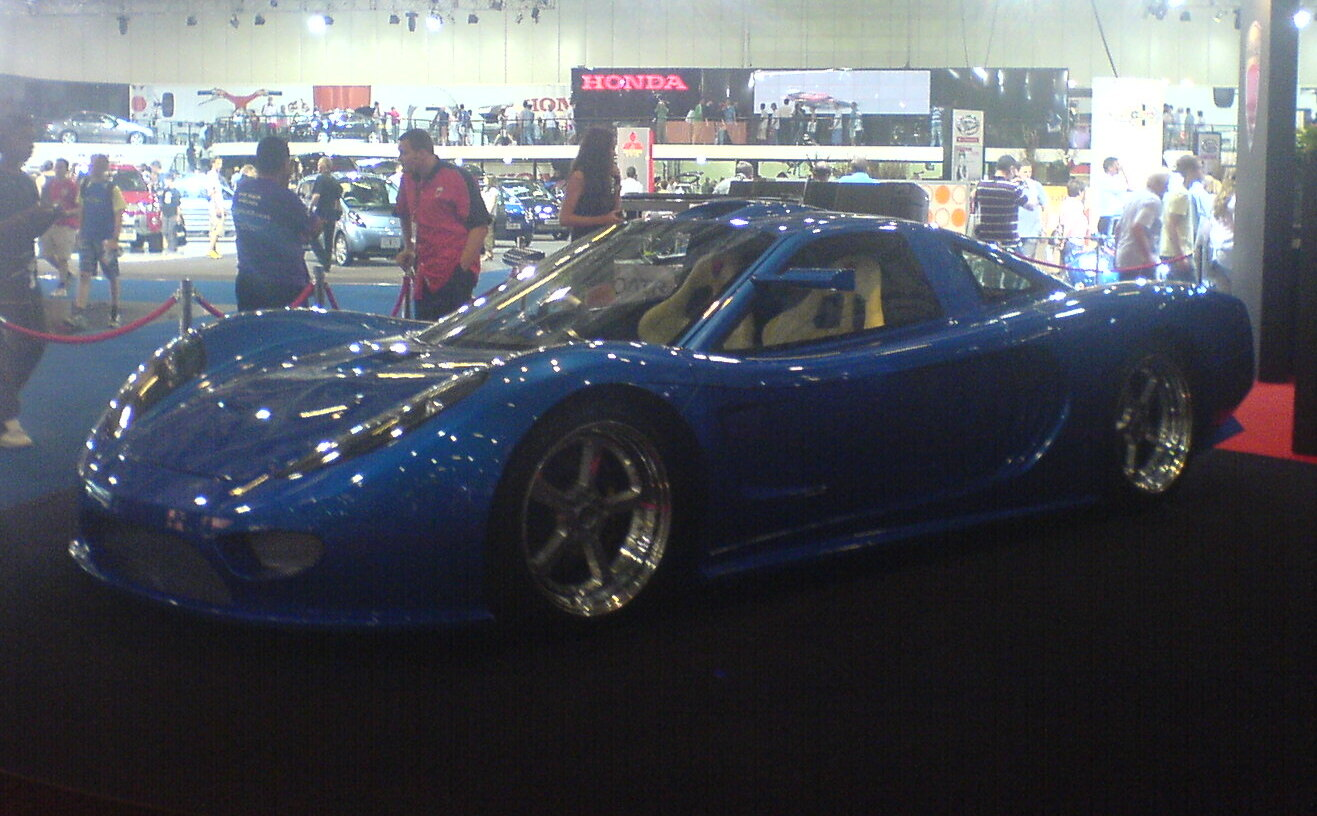

Overview
- Manufacturer: Keating Supercars
- Production: 2009–present
- Assembly: UK

Body and chassis
- Body style: 2-seat berlinetta
- Layout: Mid-engine, rear-wheel drive

Powertrain
- Engine: 7.0 L twin-turbocharged V8
- Transmission: 5-speed manual

Dimensions
- Length: 4,413 mm (173.7 in)
- Width: 1,900 mm (75 in)
- Height: 1,145 mm (45.1 in)
- Curb weight: 1,190 kg (2,624 lb)

The Keating TKR is a British sports car by Keating Supercars. The company that produces it (Keating; formerly known as Barabus Sportscars Ltd) was founded by Tony Keating and is based in Bolton, Greater Manchester, England. The TKR features a twin turbocharged 7.0L V8 petrol engine derived from the General Motors LS (LS7) series.

The TKR has been recorded travelling at 260.1 mph at the El Mirage Lake, California. In 2010, the TKR was set to be the car of choice to break the blind land speed record. The car crashed on a test run and was unable to break this record.

== Development ==
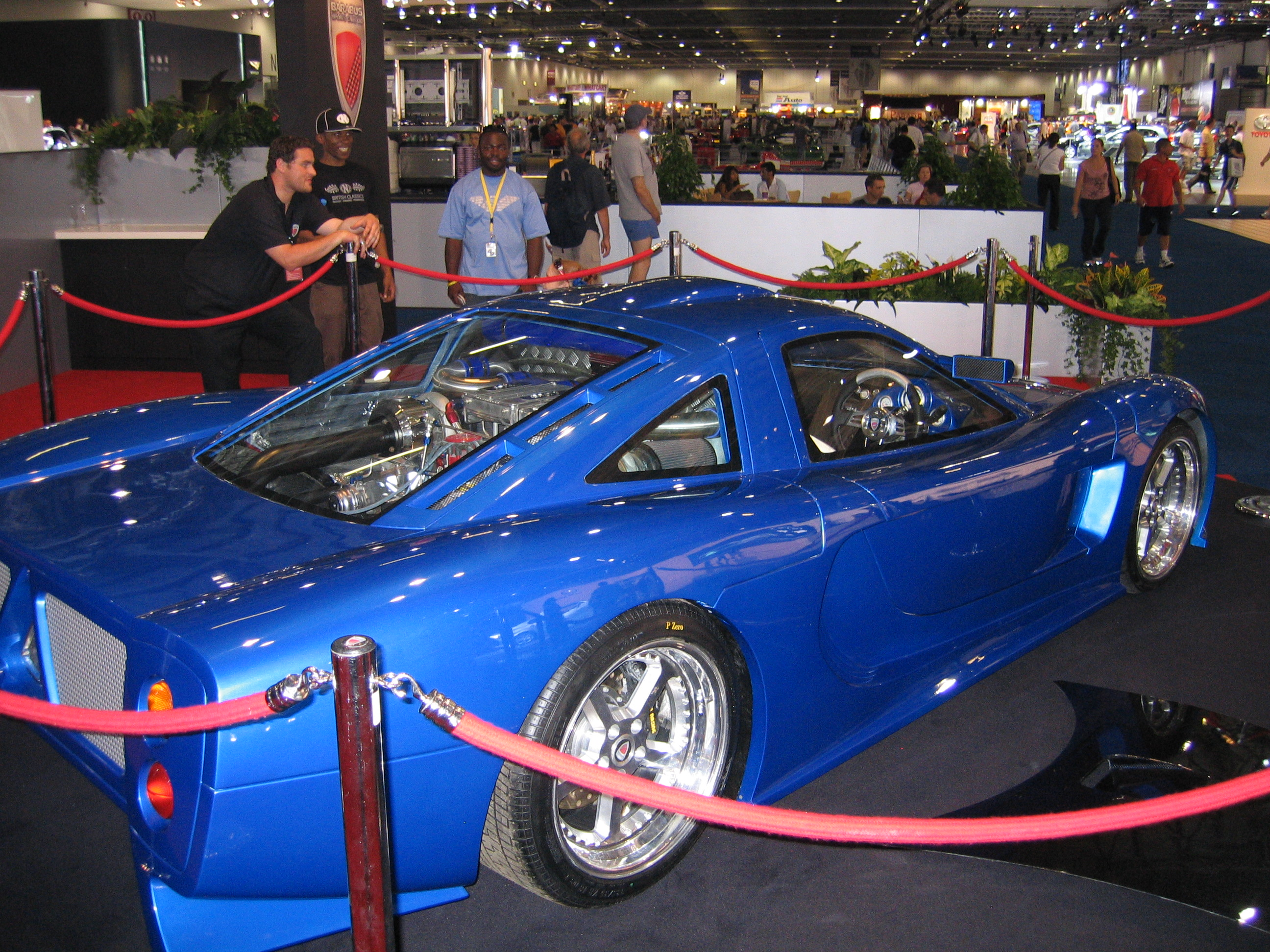
Barabus TKR-1 in London at the British Motor Show in 2006

=== Barabus TKR ===
Barabus TKR
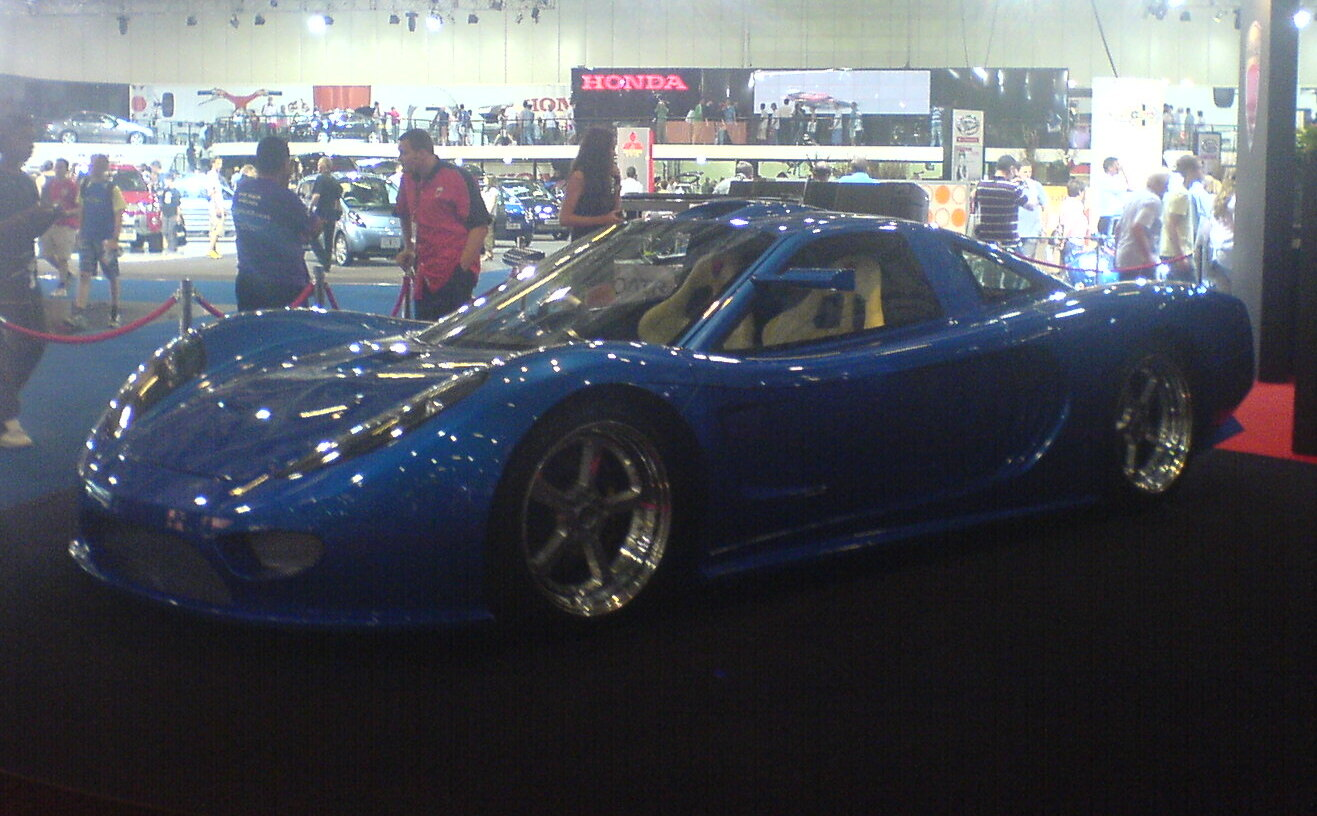
- Barabus TKR-1

Overview
- Manufacturer: Barabus
- Production: ? –3 years (according to manufacturer)
- Assembly: Colonnella, Italy

Body and chassis
- Body style: 2-door coupe

Powertrain
- Engine: 6.0 L twin-turbocharged V8

Dimensions
- Curb weight: 1,800 kg (4,000 lb)

Chronology
- Successor: Keating TKR

The idea for a car with the attributes of the Barabus TKR was born in 1996. The project was formed in the Italian town of Colonnella and included a plan to import the drive system from a factory in Great Britain.

Eventually, a prototype was placed on display at the 2006 British International Motor Show in London. At the time of its official release in mid-2006, the Barabus TKR was promoted as a supercar that could reach a top speed of 435 km/h (270 mph), with the ability to accelerate from 0-60 mph (97 km/h) in 2 seconds.

The TKR uses a 6.0 L (1.6 US gal) V8 engine equipped with two turbochargers. The engine reportedly produces 1,005 hp (749 kW) at 6,800 rpm, which classified it among the most powerful production cars in the world at the time, including the Bugatti Veyron 16.4 and SSC Ultimate Aero. At least one TKR was fitted with an upgraded 7.0 L engine built by Nelson Racing Engines, producing around 1,800 hp (1,342 kW), and was used for top speed runs, achieving a speed of 260.1 mph (419 km/h) on El Mirage Lake. The interior of the TKR is made from a combination of fine leather and suede, while the accents are provided by materials (such as brushed aluminium or carbon fiber) combined with painted highlights.
