= William H. Keating =

American geologist (1799–1840)

William Hypolitus (or Hippolitus, or Hypolite) Keating (August 11, 1799 in Wilmington, Delaware – 1840 in London, England) was an American geologist. His father, Baron John Keating, of Irish ancestry, had been an officer in the French army in the West Indies and had settled in Wilmington, Delaware. Keating was educated at the University of Pennsylvania, and then in France and Switzerland, where he studied mining. In 1822, he became Professor of Chemistry and Mineralogy at the University of Pennsylvania and a member of the American Philosophical Society (elected in 1822).

He is perhaps best known for his work on the staff of Stephen Long's expedition to the Great Lakes in 1823, an account of which he published in 1824. In the account he first hypothesized the existence of what is now known as Lake Agassiz. Formed at the end of the last ice age during the retreat of the great North American glaciers Lake Agassiz was, at its peak, much larger than any currently existing lake. The tremendous significance of the discovery has come to be appreciated in recent decades because the draining of Lake Agassiz into the North Atlantic Ocean is now generally thought to have been responsible for sudden periods of cooling of Northern Hemisphere climate at the end of the Pleistocene. The most dramatic of these periods of cooling is known as the Younger Dryas.
