= Patrick N. Keating =

British physicist

- Born: England
- Died: 21 January 2019; Lakewood Ranch, Florida, United States
- Education: University of Nottingham, University of Michigan
- Known for: Keating model of interatomic forces
- Scientific career
- Fields: solid-state physics, optics, liquid crystals, signal processing

Dr. Patrick N. Keating was a theoretical physicist who contributed to several fields of solid-state physics, including semiconductors, semi-insulators and the basic properties of solid materials, and to other fields including optics, liquid crystals, acoustic holography, and signal processing. He was best known for the Keating Model of interatomic forces in tetrahedrally-coordinated solids (P. N. Keating, Effect of Invariance Requirements On The Elastic Strain Energy of Crystals, With Application to the Diamond Structure, Phys. Rev. 145, 637 (1966), which was determined to be one of the 50 highest-impact papers over a century of Physical Review publications).

== Biography ==
Dr. Keating was born in England and educated as a physicist there (University of Nottingham) and in the United States (University of Michigan, 1969). He served as Director and General Manager of both the Advanced Technology Center and the Microelectronics Center of Allied-Signal Corporation (now part of Honeywell Inc.), and lived in Maryland, Florida, and Delaware with his wife of 30 years, Julie Scott Keating. He had two married daughters, Clare and Fiona. Keating was an enthusiastic tennis player, golfer, sailor, and aviator, and held an FAA pilot's license. He died in Lakewood Ranch, Florida, on 21 January 2019.

In addition to his contributions to the science of Physics, Dr. Keating's research interests included Climate Science, and a research paper in that field was published in the International Journal of Climatology.
