= Morrisdale, Pennsylvania =

Unincorporated community in Pennsylvania, US

- Census-designated place
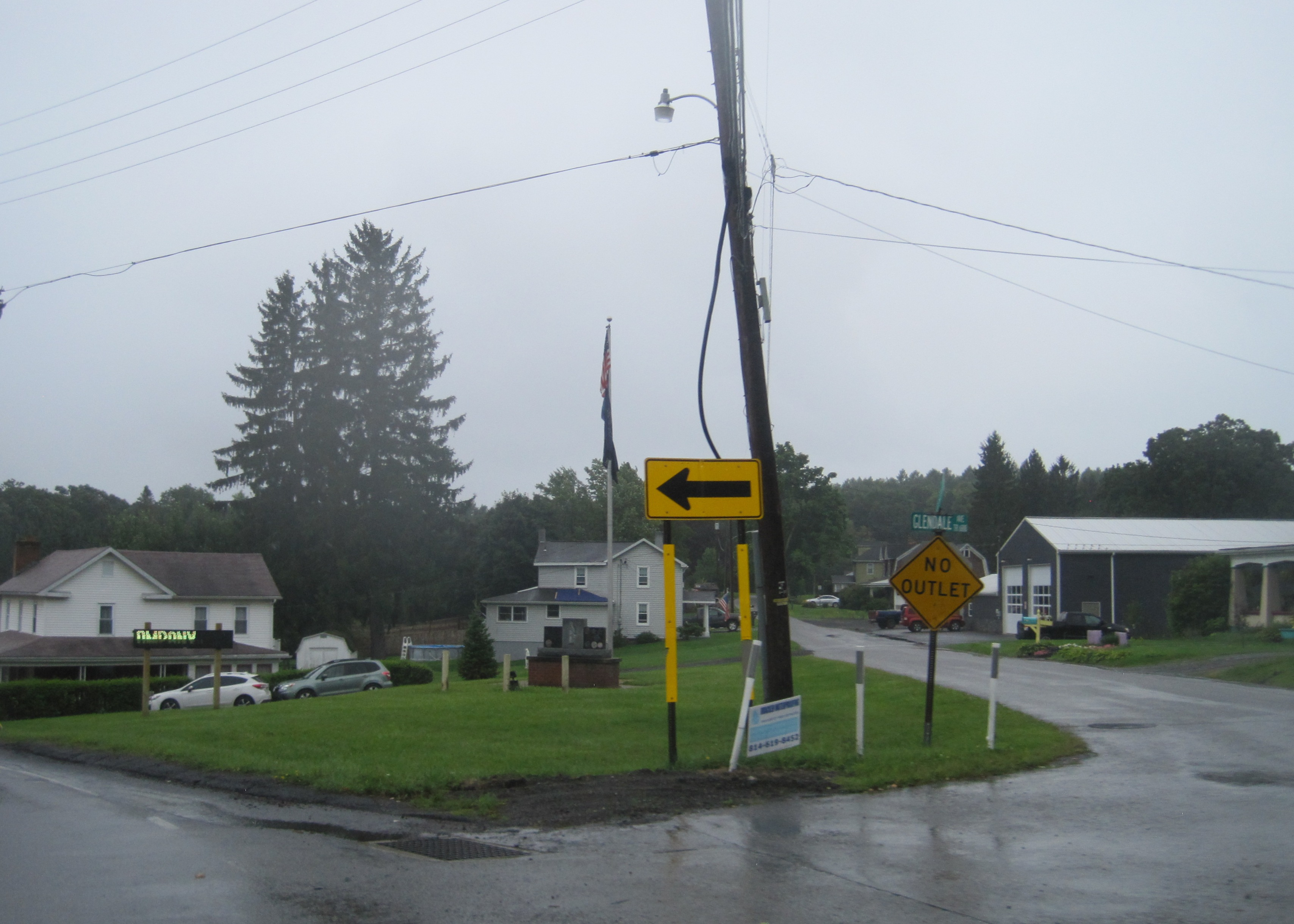
- Veterans memorial in Morrisdale

- Location in Pennsylvania Morrisdale (the United States)
- Coordinates: 40°56′56″N 78°13′31″W
- Country: United States
- State: Pennsylvania
- County: Clearfield
- Township: Morris

Area
  - Total: 1.69 sq mi (4.37 km^{2})
  - Land: 1.68 sq mi (4.36 km^{2})
  - Water: 0.0039 sq mi (0.01 km^{2})
- Elevation: 1,643 ft (501 m)

Population (2023)
  - Total: 815
  - Density: 406.2/sq mi (156.82/km^{2})
- Time zone: UTC-5 (Eastern (EST))
  - Summer (DST): UTC-4 (EDT)
- ZIP code: 16858
- FIPS code: 42-51120
- GNIS feature ID: 1181580

Morrisdale is a census-designated place located in Morris Township, Clearfield County, in the state of Pennsylvania. As of the 2020 census, the population was 684.

Its location is approximately 5 miles (8 km) north of Philipsburg on Pennsylvania Route 53.

Notable People - Levi Jones from the American EDM pop duo O.D.L (Our Dysfunctional Life). He was formerly a member of the American pop band The Tide.

== Demographics ==
Historical population
Census	Pop.	Note	%±
2010	754		—
2020	684		−9.3%
U.S. Decennial Census
