= Kylertown, Pennsylvania =

Unincorporated community in Pennsylvania, US

- Census-designated place
- Location in Pennsylvania Kylertown (the United States)
- Coordinates: 40°59′36″N 78°10′2″W
- Country: United States
- State: Pennsylvania
- County: Clearfield
- Townships: Cooper, Graham

Area
  - Total: 1.72 sq mi (4.45 km^{2})
  - Land: 1.72 sq mi (4.45 km^{2})
  - Water: 0 sq mi (0.00 km^{2})
- Elevation: 1,646 ft (502 m)

Population (2020)
  - Total: 336
  - Density: 195.6/sq mi (75.54/km^{2})
- Time zone: UTC-5 (Eastern (EST))
  - Summer (DST): UTC-4 (EDT)
- ZIP code: 16847
- FIPS code: 42-40680
- GNIS feature ID: 1192725

Kylertown is a census-designated place (CDP) in Graham and Cooper townships, Clearfield County, in the U.S. state of Pennsylvania. As of the 2020 census, the population was 336.

It is located on Pennsylvania Route 53 at Exit 133 of Interstate 80. Clearfield, the county seat, is 16 miles (26 km) to the west, and Snow Shoe in Centre County is 15 miles (24 km) to the east.

== Demographics ==
Historical population
Census	Pop.	Note	%±
2010	340		—
2020	336		−1.2%
U.S. Decennial Census
