= GP Strategies Corporation =

American consulting firm

- Traded as: NYSE: GPX; Russell 2000 Component
- Industry: Professional services Technology services
- Founded: 1959
- Headquarters: Corporate headquarters in Columbia, Maryland
- Area served: Worldwide
- Key people: Adam Stedham(CEO); Michael Dugan (CFO)
- Services: Training, management consulting, technology services, outsourcing
- Revenue: ▲US$501.9 million (2014)
- Number of employees: 4,500 (October 2022)
- Website: www.gpstrategies.com

GP Strategies Corp. (NYSE: GPX; formerly General Physics Corporation) is a provider of sales and technical training, E-learning, management consulting and engineering services headquartered in Columbia, Maryland, United States.

== History ==
GP Strategies Corporation was founded in 1959 as a venture capital firm focusing on technology companies. In 1960 it went public.

In 1986, NPDC purchased majority ownership of General Physics Corporation ("GP" or "General Physics"), which was established in 1966. Originally, GP provided technical services to the Navy Submarine Nuclear Power Program in the areas of operations, safety, and training. Throughout the 1970s and 1980s, GP expanded its service offering and industry focus through internal investment and acquisitions that expanded its reach into environmental, energy, IT, and other government markets.

In 1998, NPDC changed its name to GP Strategies Corporation. In 2003, GP Strategies decided to focus on its training, engineering, and consulting business operated by GP and embarked on a plan to spin off certain non-core assets to stockholders. In November 2004, GP Strategies spun off its non-core assets into a separate corporation which was named National Patent Development Corporation. In September 2005, GP Strategies completed the spin-off of all of its non-core assets with the spin-off of its ownership in GSE Systems.

From 2005 to 2011, GP Strategies was a holding company, consisting solely of its wholly owned operating subsidiary, General Physics. Effective January 1, 2012, GP Strategies merged with and into General Physics, eliminating the holding company structure. General Physics was the surviving legal corporation and was renamed GP Strategies Corporation effective with the merger. Following the merger, there were no material changes to the company's financial position, business operations, state of incorporation, directors, executive officers, or management.

In July 2021, it was reported that London-based Learning Technologies Group would acquire GP Strategies Corporation.
