= West Keating Township, Pennsylvania =

Township in Pennsylvania, US

Coordinates: 41°15′30″N 78°02′29″W

- Township
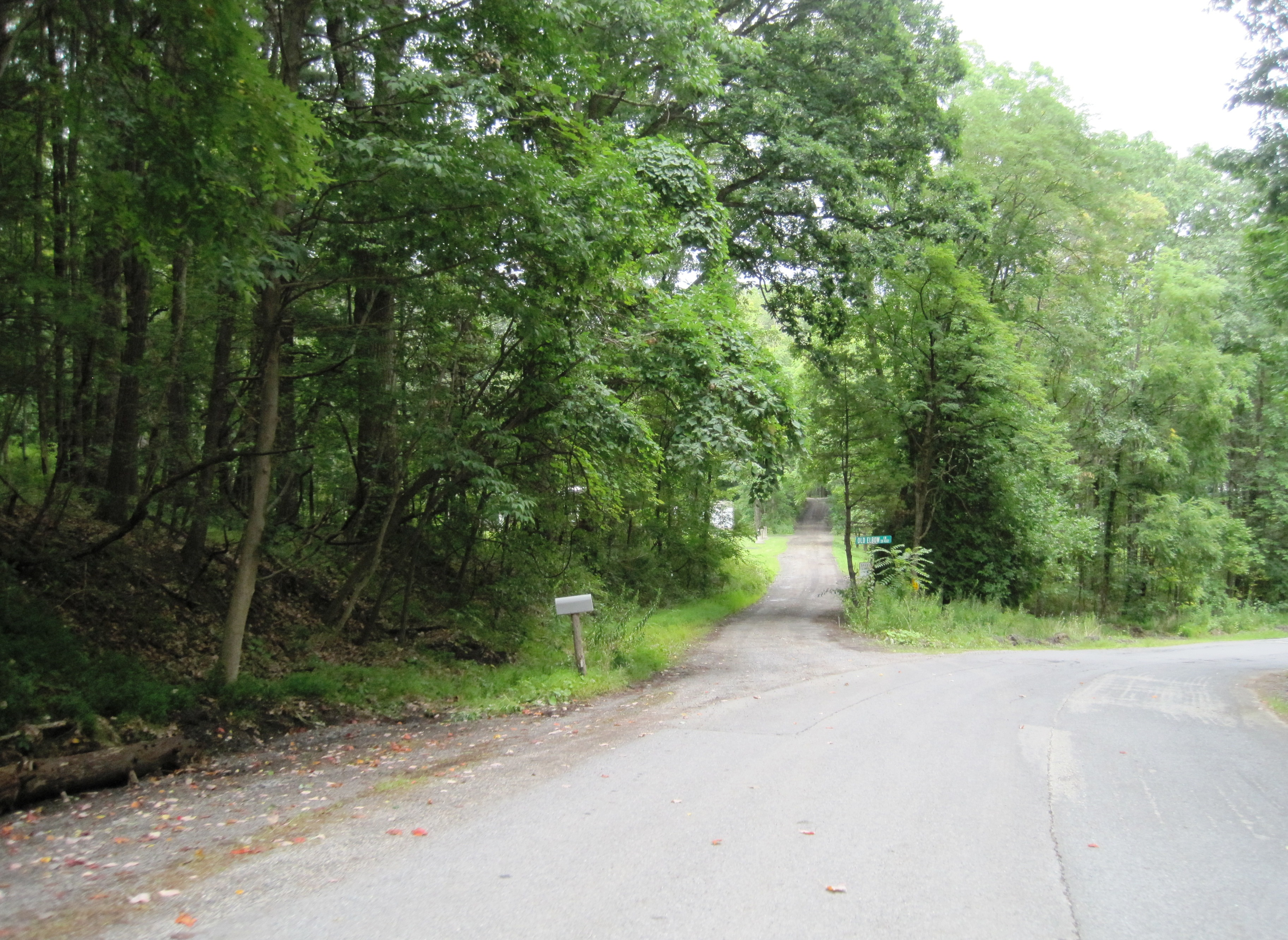
- Old Elbow Lane within the township

- Location in Clinton County and the state of Pennsylvania.
- Country: United States
- State: Pennsylvania
- County: Clinton
- Settled: 1805
- Incorporated: 1875

Area
  - Total: 38.48 sq mi (99.66 km^{2})
  - Land: 38.13 sq mi (98.75 km^{2})
  - Water: 0.35 sq mi (0.90 km^{2})

Population (2010)
  - Total: 29
  - Estimate (2016): 29
  - Density: 0.75/sq mi (0.29/km^{2})
- FIPS code: 42-035-83240

West Keating Township is a township that is located in Clinton County, Pennsylvania, United States. The population was 16 at the time of the 2020 census, which was a decline from the figure of 29 that was tabulated in 2010.

== Geography ==
The township is located in westernmost Clinton County and is bordered to the northwest by Cameron County, to the southwest by Clearfield County, and to the southeast, across the West Branch Susquehanna River, by Centre County. Noyes Township is located to the northeast. Until January 1, 2025, East Keating Township was located to the northeast, but was dissolved into Noyes Township.

According to the United States Census Bureau, West Keating Township has a total area of 38.5 square miles (99.7 km^{2}), of which 38.1 square miles (98.8 km^{2}) is land and 0.35 square miles (0.9 km^{2}), or 0.91%, is water.

== Demographics ==
Historical population
Census	Pop.	Note	%±
1980	43		—
1990	34		−20.9%
2000	42		23.5%
2010	29		−31.0%
2020	16		−44.8%

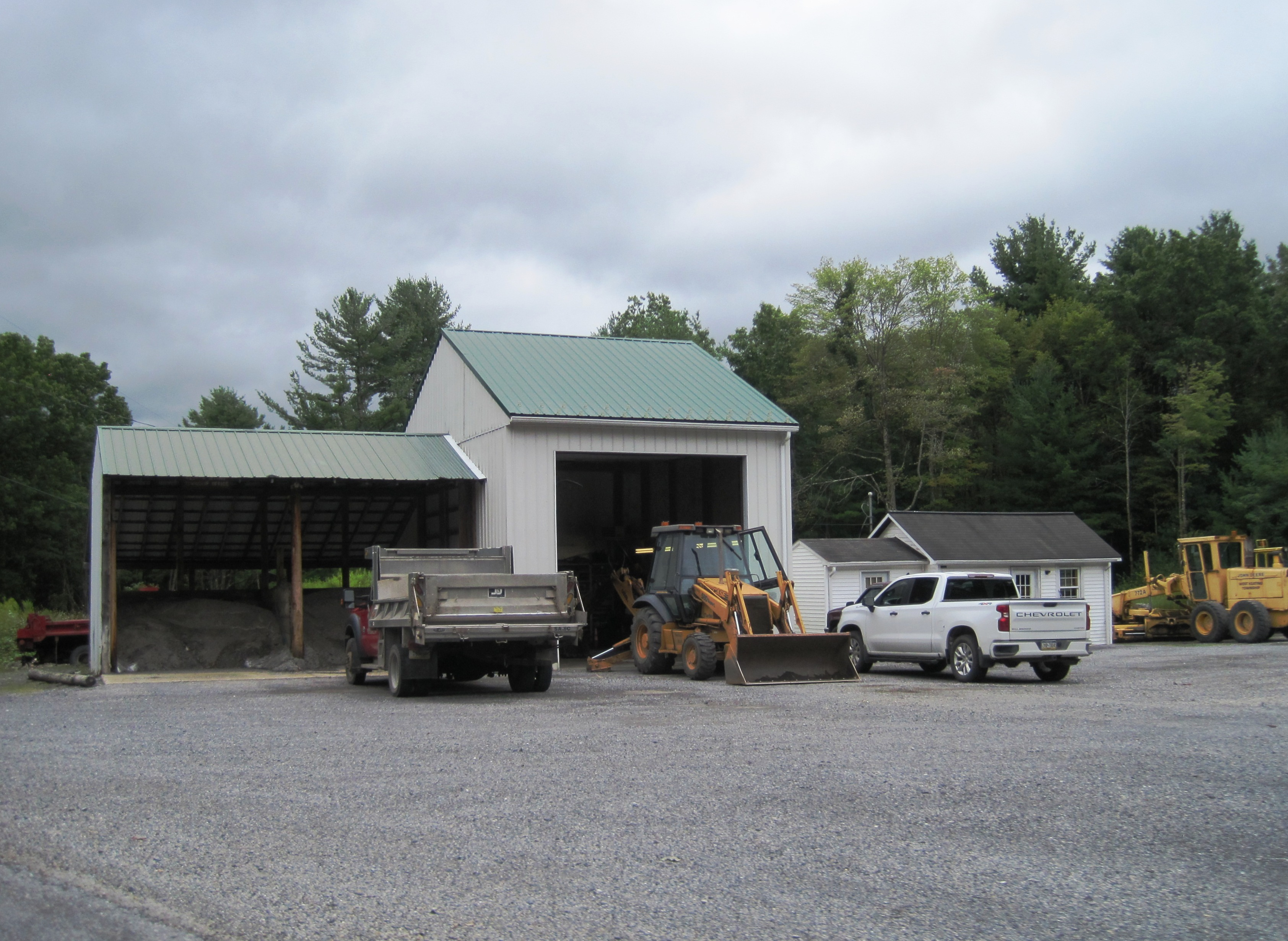
West Keating Town Hall

As of the census of 2020, there were 11 households and 16 residents in the township.

The population density was 1.1 people per square mile (0.4/km^{2}). There were 106 housing units at an average density of 4.4/sq mi (1.7/km^{2}).

The racial makeup of the township was 97.62% White, and 2.38% from two or more races.

There were 19 households, out of which 10.5% had children who were under the age of eighteen living with them; 57.9% were married couples living together, and 21.1% were non-families. Out of all of the households that were documented, 15.8% were made up of individuals, and 15.8% had someone living alone who was sixty-five years of age or older.

The average household size was 2.21 and the average family size was 2.33.

Within the township, the population was spread out, with 9.5% of residents who were under the age of 18, 19.0% from 25 to 44, 45.2% from 45 to 64, and 26.2% who were 65 years of age or older. The median age was 59 years.

For every one hundred females, there were 133.3 males. For every one hundred females who were aged eighteen or older, there were 123.5 males.

The median income for a household in the township was $23,750, and the median income for a family was $37,500. Males had a median income of $52,500 compared with that of $16,875 for females.

The per capita income for the township was $17,224. There were 14.3% of families and 17.1% of the population living below the poverty line, including 16.7% of those who were aged sixty-five or older; however, no one under the age of eighteen was reported as living in poverty.
