= Laneville =

Laneville may mean:

- Laneville, Hale County, Alabama
- Laneville, Lowndes County, Alabama
- Laneville, Texas
  - Laneville High School
  - Laneville Independent School District
- Laneville, West Virginia
- Laneville, Wisconsin
