= Bear Rocks =

Bear Rocks may refer to:

- Bear Rocks, Pennsylvania, census-designated place in Pennsylvania, United States
- Bear Rocks Preserve, wilderness area in West Virginia, United States
