= Sods =

Term for meadow or bog in West Virginia

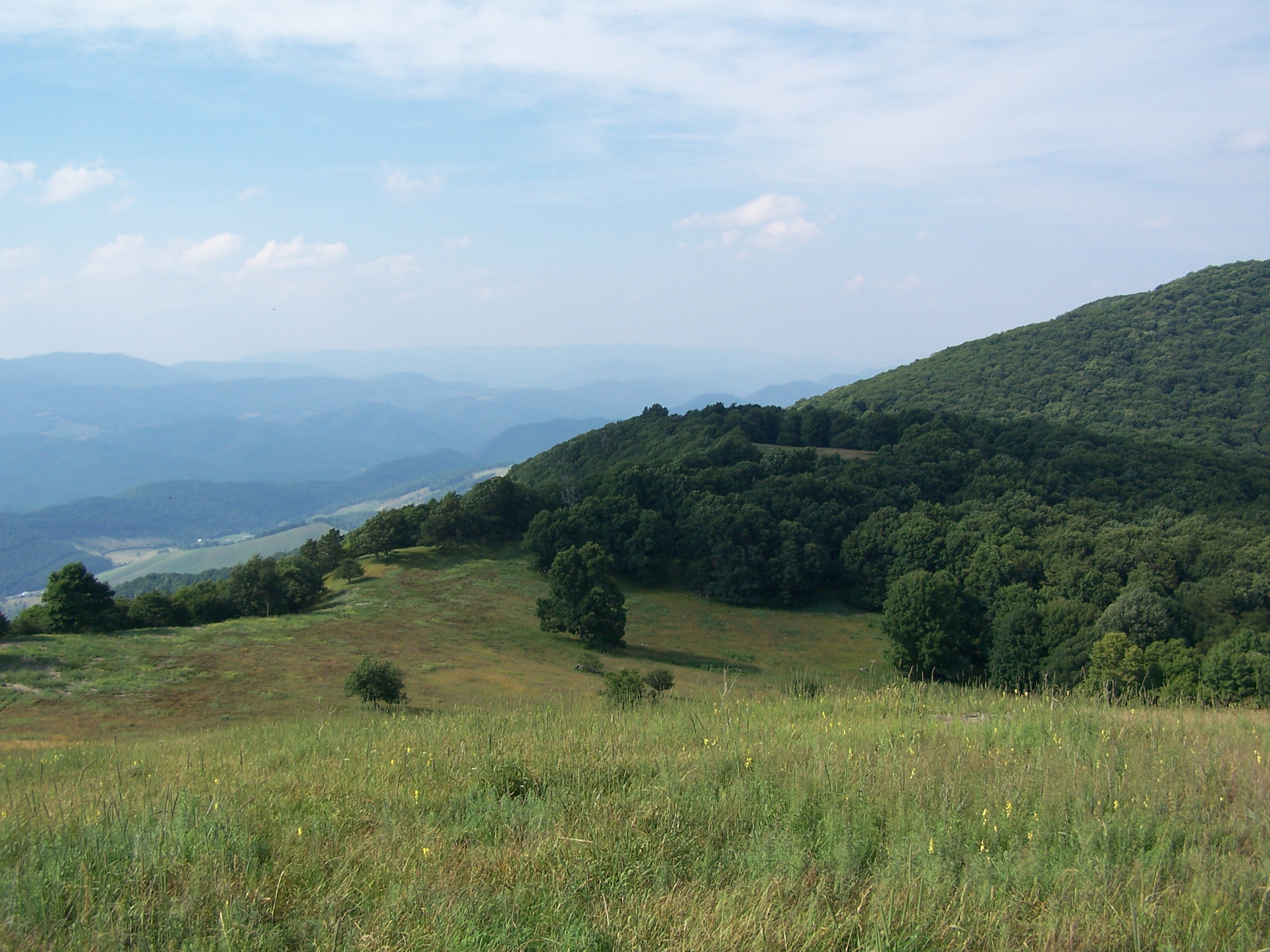
Nelson Sods on North Fork Mountain, West Virginia

Sods is a term used in the Allegheny Mountains of eastern West Virginia for a mountain top meadow or bog, in an area that is otherwise generally forested. The term is similar (perhaps identical) to that of a "grass bald", a more widespread designation applied throughout the central and southern Appalachian region.

The best known example of a sods is Dolly Sods, a federally designated wilderness area in Tucker County, West Virginia and popular destination for recreationalists. Other examples include Nelson Sods (Pendleton County) and Baker Sods (Randolph County).

== Ecology ==
West Virginia University botanist Earl L. Core addressed the origin of the "sods" in 1973:

How did it happen that these grassy tracts were originally [prior to white settlement] treeless, when all the surrounding areas were covered with trees? No one really knows. Although the "sods" and "balds" have been the subject of much speculation, discussion, and research, no generally-accepted explanation has yet been proposed for their existence. Perhaps there is not really any one cause; the treelessness may be the result of a complex situation which may vary from place to place. Factors suggested may be classified as natural or artificial. Among the natural have been listed climatic, edaphic (soil), topographic, biotic and pyric (fire).

The dominant grass is Allegheny flyback (danthonia compressa), a grass so light in weight that it would "fly back" against the scythe of the mower.

== See also ==
- Appalachian bogs
