= Laneville, West Virginia =

Laneville
- Unincorporated community
- Location within the state of West Virginia Laneville (the United States)
- Coordinates: 38°58′23″N 79°24′59″W
- Country: United States
- State: West Virginia
- County: Tucker
- Time zone: UTC-5 (Eastern (EST))
  - Summer (DST): UTC-4 (EDT)

Laneville, also known locally as Lanesville, is an unincorporated community in Tucker County, West Virginia, United States. It lies on Red Creek (a tributary of Dry Fork of Cheat River) along the southern border of the Dolly Sods Wilderness in the Monongahela National Forest.

== History ==
In 1902, the Parsons Pulp and Lumber Company installed a new band saw mill on Red Creek. The lumber boom town of Laneville soon sprang up around it with a population that peaked at over 300 people. The community was named for Martin Lane, one of four incorporators of the Dry Fork Lumber Company.

In 1909, after a local vote, Laneville was incorporated for the purpose of prohibiting saloons. Saloon patrons had no difficulty, however, walking the short distance down the railroad tracks to the Wyoming Lumber Company settlement, established in 1907, where such businesses were allowed to flourish.

It was into the mill at Laneville that most of the timber of the southern two thirds of Dolly Sods disappeared. The Laneville mill closed in 1920 after almost all the timber had been cut and its population dwindled. There were fewer than 50 residents by the mid-1970s.
