= Laneville Independent School District =

School district in Texas

Laneville Independent School District is a public school district based in the community of Laneville, Texas (USA).

Laneville ISD has one school, Laneville School that serves students in grades Pre-Kindergarten though twelve.

In 2009, the school district was rated "recognized" by the Texas Education Agency.
