= Bear Rocks Preserve =

Wilderness area in West Virginia

- IUCN category V (protected landscape/seascape)
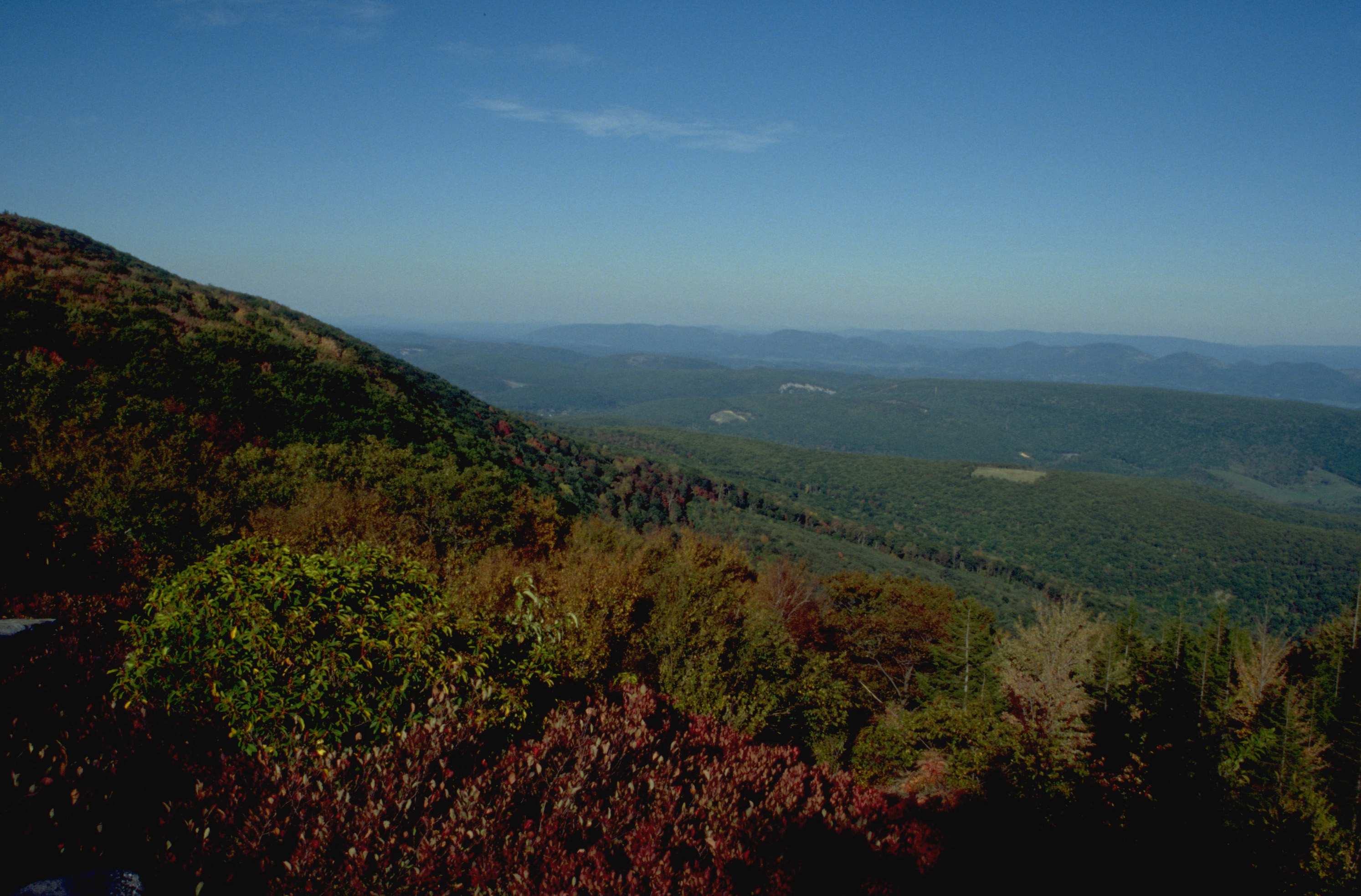
- View from Bear Rocks

- Location within West Virginia
- Location: Grant County & Tucker County, West Virginia, United States
- Coordinates: 39°04′23″N 79°17′53″W
- Area: 477 acres (193 ha)
- Elevation: 3,999 ft (1,219 m)
- Website: Bear Rocks Preserve

Bear Rocks is a widely recognized symbol of West Virginia wilderness and among the most frequently photographed places in the state. It is a well-known landmark on the eastern edge of the plateau that includes the Dolly Sods Wilderness. It sits in a high-elevation heathland punctuated with wind-carved sandstone outcrops and is home to more than a dozen rare plant and animal species. Situated on the crest of the Allegheny Front, Bear Rocks afford vistas over the South Branch Potomac River. Visibility can extend eastward to the Shenandoah National Park in Virginia.

The Bear Rocks Preserve is a 477-acre (1.93 km^{2}) tract owned and preserved by The Nature Conservancy.

== Location ==
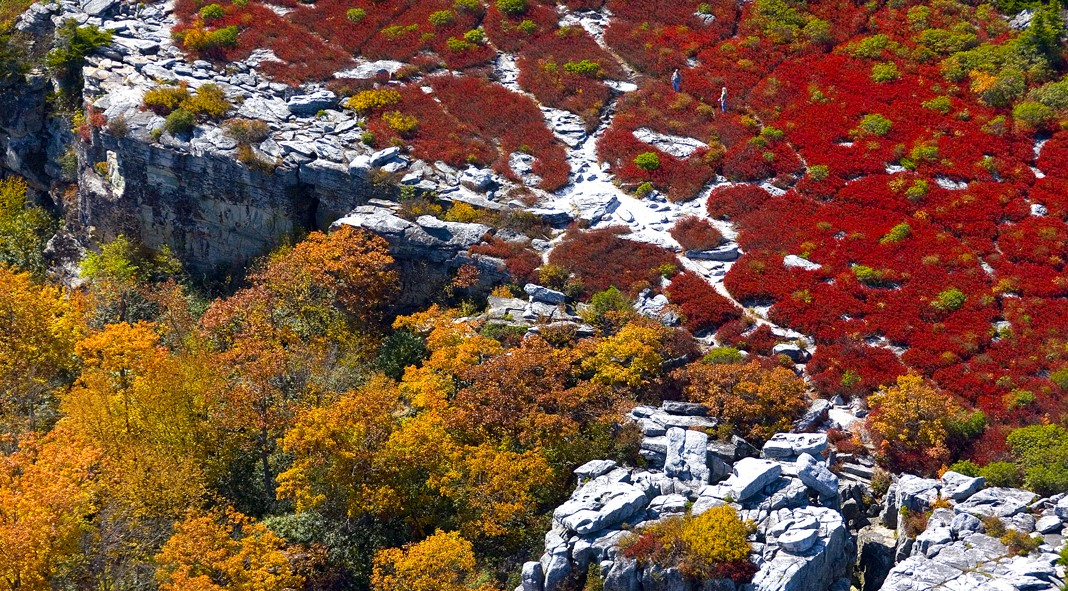
Aerial Photo of Bear Rocks at Dolly Sods.

Bear Rocks consists of a group of rock outcroppings on the Allegheny Front, an escarpment that in this area provides about two thousand feet of vertical relief and forms the Eastern Continental Divide. To the east, looking out over the South Branch of the Potomac River, which drains into the Atlantic Ocean via the Chesapeake Bay, there are breathtaking 35-mile (56 km) views where seven mountain ridges are visible on a clear day extending into Virginia. On the clearest days you can see Hawksbill Mountain and Stony Man, the highest peaks in Shenandoah National Park. To the west, water drains into Dolly Sods towards Red Creek, which eventually flows to the Gulf of Mexico via the Dry Fork River, Black Fork, Cheat, Mongahela, Ohio and Mississippi River. Farther north along the ridge of the Front are two more salients, Stack Rocks and Haystack Rocks.

== Climate ==
Bear Rocks is known for its cool climate, alpine appearance and northern wildlife. Strong prevailing winds bring clouds from the west. While rising to clear the ridge of the Allegheny Front they cool, causing mist and rain totaling more than 60 inches (1,500 mm) per year. During the winter of 2003, 290 inches (7.4 m) of snow fell in the area, although 160 inches (4.1 m) is more typical. The trees and shrubs become broken downward and gnarled along the ridge from the drying winds, the chilling rime frost and the heavy ice glazing and snow. Along the rim are stunted red spruce trees with flag-formed limbs pointing to the east – a result of the almost constant and often high-velocity winds.

== Ecology ==
One-quarter to one-half (400 to 800 m) a mile below the ridge lies a moist forest of red spruce and hemlock, with a floor blanketed in ferns, mountain laurel and rhododendron thickets. But on the broad ridge top where the climate is the most severe, the lush vegetation gives way to stunted, scattered trees, open heath land, and tundra plants left over from the ice ages.

Many of the plants and animals here are typically found in the North, such as snowshoe hare, saw-whet owls, boreal red-backed voles, and fisher. It is also a prime raptor and warbler-watching site during autumn migration and a popular berry-picking spot in midsummer.

The area around Bear Rocks supports subalpine heathlands dominated by shrubs such as blueberries, huckleberries, mountain laurel, azalea, and rhododendron. Groves of stunted red spruce, flagged by ice and wind, outcrops of the Pottsville conglomerate, grassy meadows, and cranberry bogs also occur. There are stunted small groves of red spruce trying to make a tortured comeback here and there in the wind and coldheath barrens of huckleberries, blueberries, mountain laurel, mountain holly, speckled alder and other waist-high plants. In several places the heath barrens, also called "huckleberry plains" or "roaring plains", give way to natural balds of mountain oat grass that predate the devastation wrought by logging and fires during the late 19th century.

== Geology ==
Large, striking and uniquely shaped white sandstone and quartz rocks are found throughout the Bear Rocks Preserve area. Erosion has carved bowl-shaped cavities in many of these wind- and rain-sculpted sandstone boulders and these cavities are often filled with water (or ice) and algae. In addition to the sculpted boulders are "rock streams" formed during glacial periods. The freeze-thaw cycles heaved and split rock, creating rock streams up to 50 feet (15 m) wide and hundreds of feet long. Other rock patterns include polygons and circles.

== Other information ==
Informal trails weave across the Bear Rocks Preserve. An extensive trail system occurs on the adjacent national forest lands, including the Dolly Sods Wilderness.

Bear Rocks' natural heathlands and open grass balds were originally recorded in 1746 by a survey party that included Peter Jefferson, father of Thomas Jefferson.
