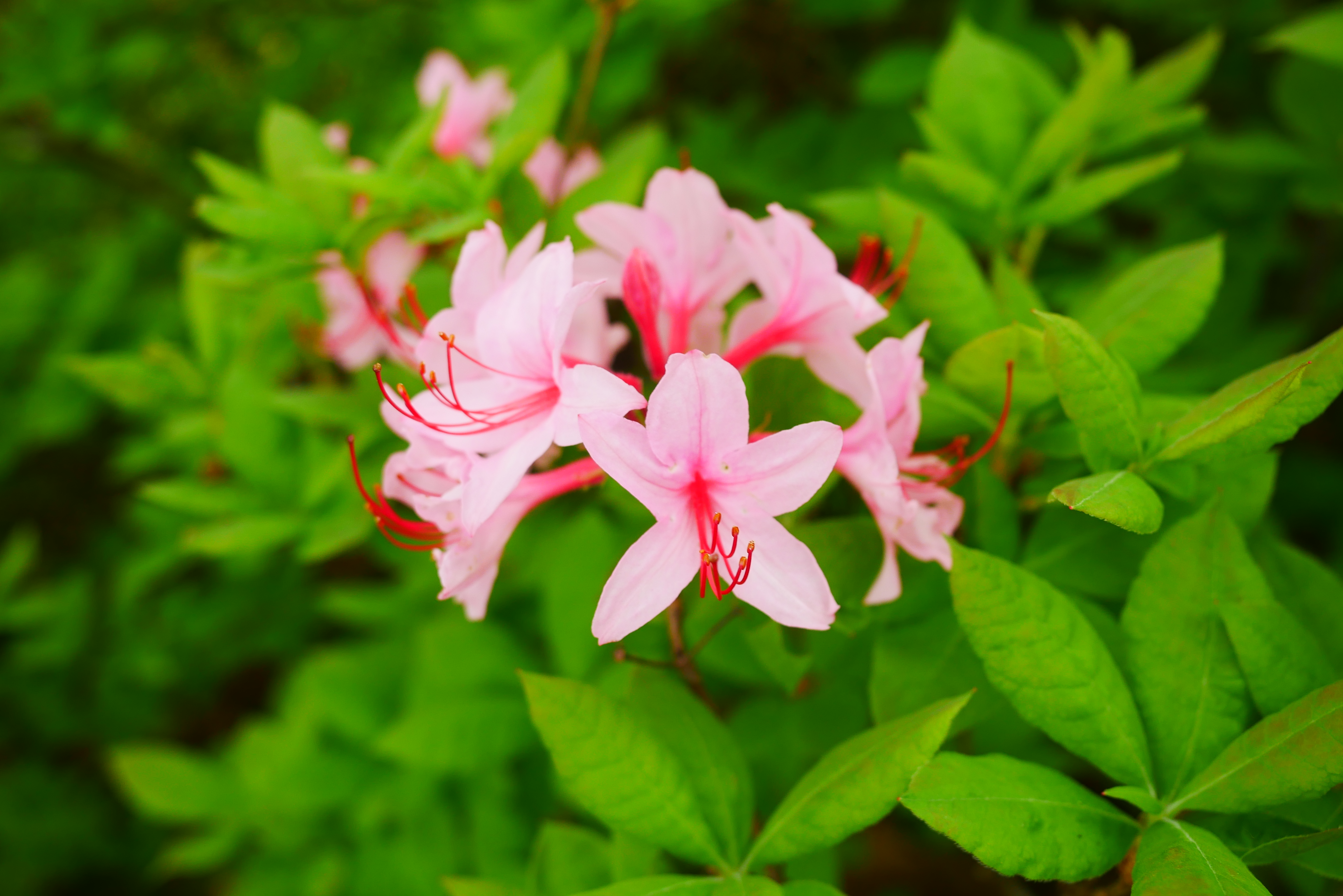

Conservation status
- Secure (NatureServe)

Scientific classification
- Kingdom: Plantae
- Clade: Tracheophytes
- Clade: Angiosperms
- Clade: Eudicots
- Clade: Asterids
- Order: Ericales
- Family: Ericaceae
- Genus: Rhododendron
- Subgenus: Rhododendron subg. Hymenanthes
- Section: Rhododendron sect. Pentanthera
- Species: R. prinophyllum

Binomial name
- Rhododendron prinophyllum (Small) Millais

Synonyms
- Azalea prinophylla Small; Rhododendron nudiflorum var. roseum (Loisel.) Wiegand; Rhododendron roseum (Loisel.) Rehder

= Rhododendron prinophyllum =

Species of plant

Rhododendron prinophyllum, the early azalea, is a rhododendron species native to the eastern and southern United States. It is a deciduous shrub that usually grows 4 to 8 feet in height, rarely reaching 15 feet. Flowers are pink.

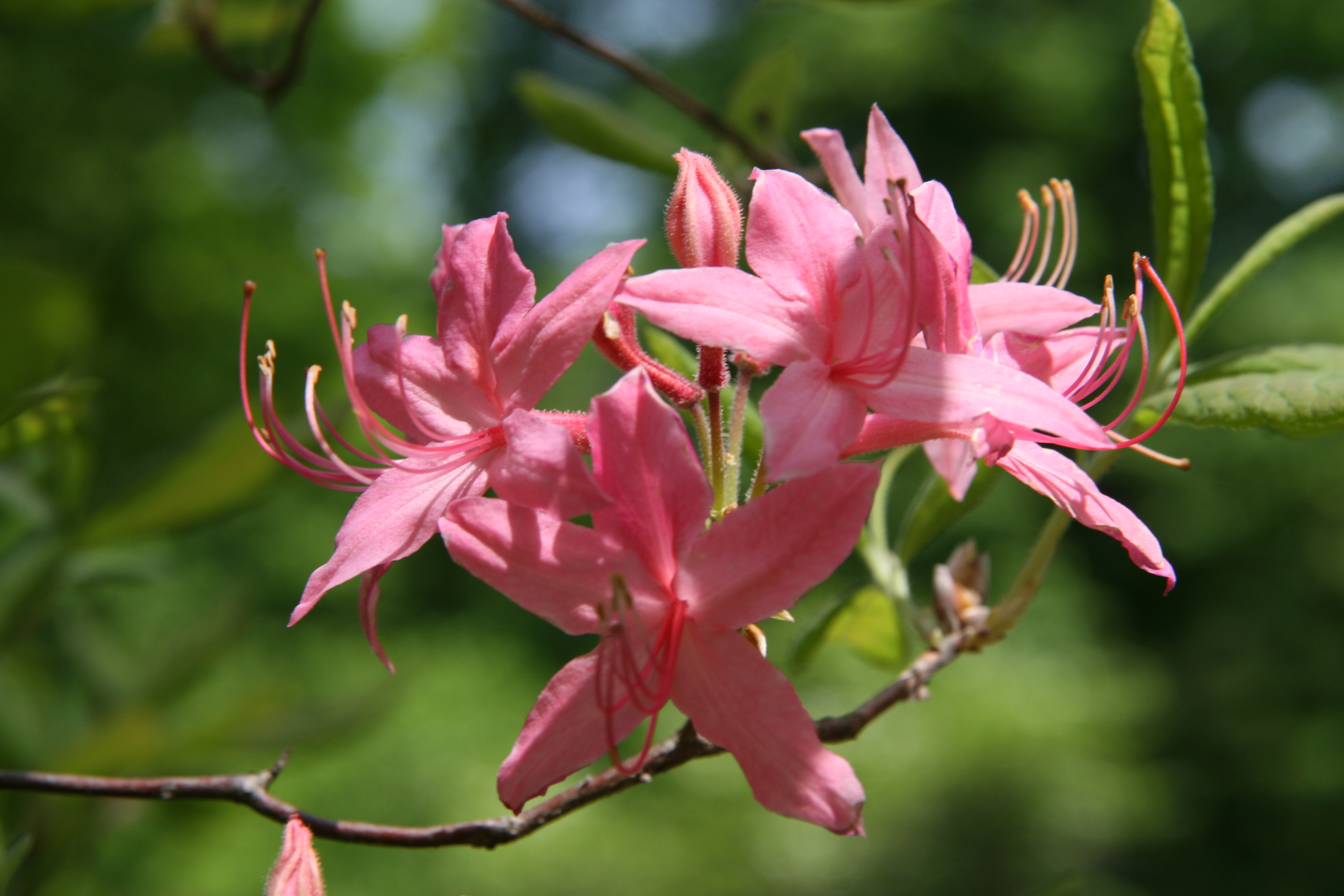

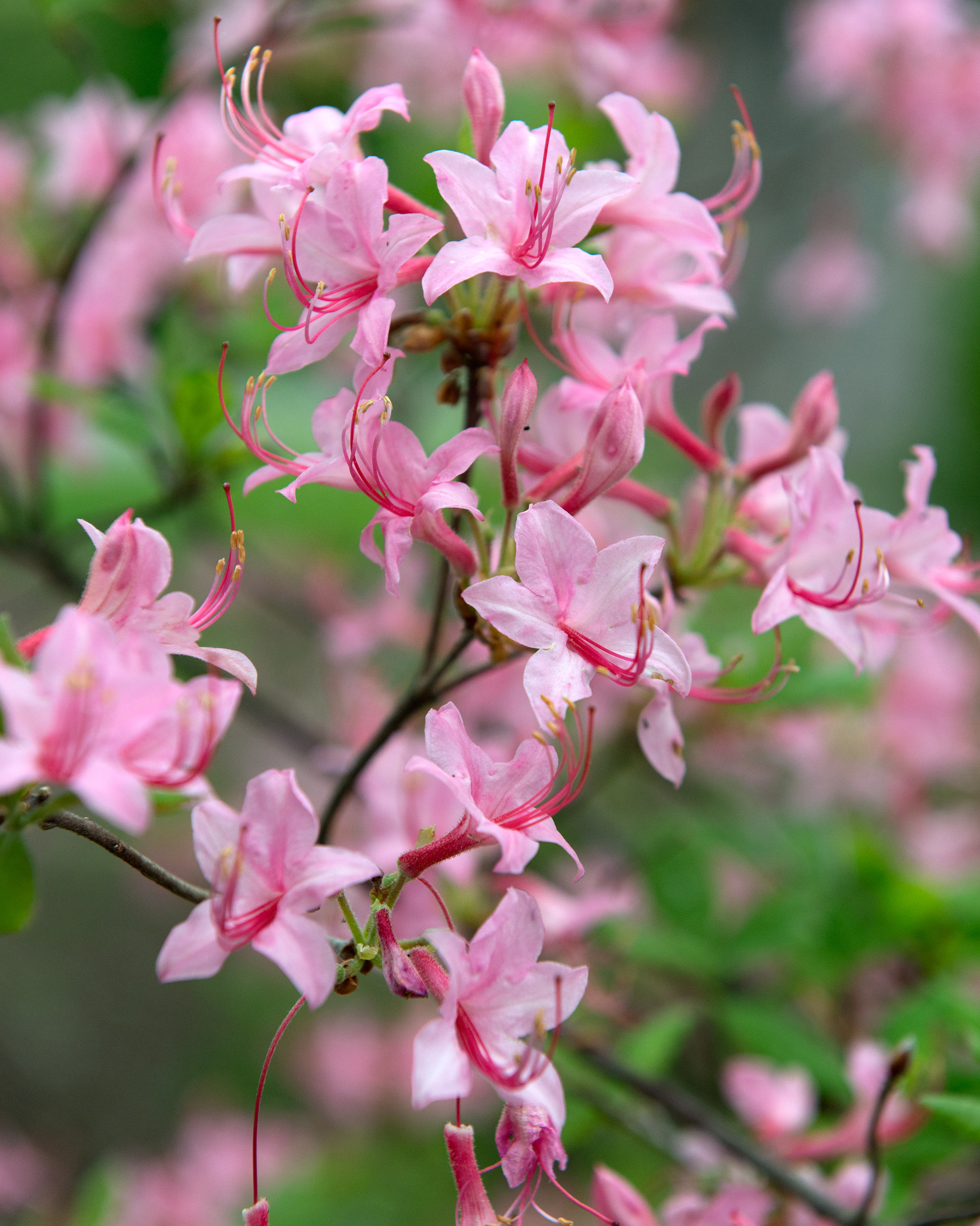

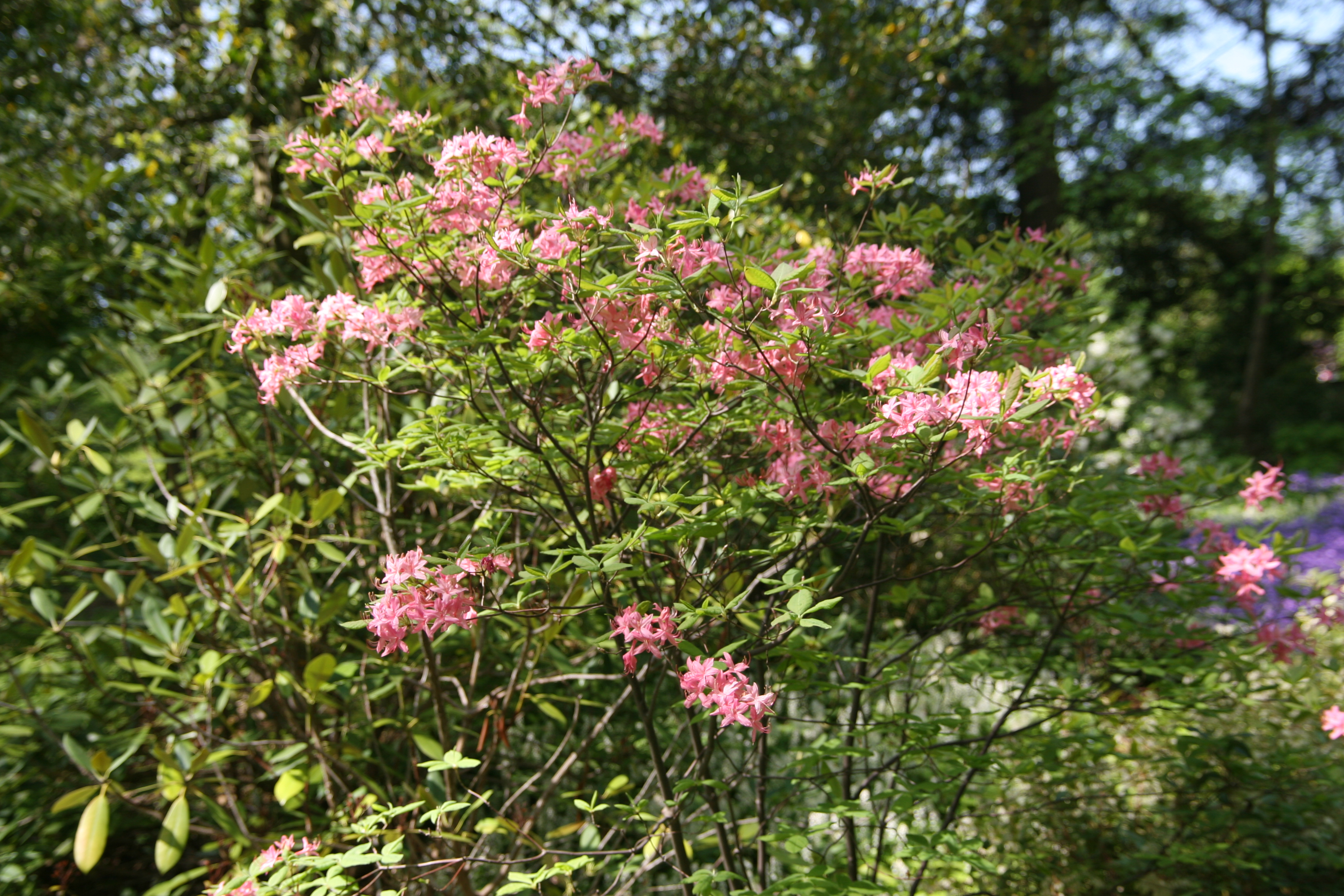

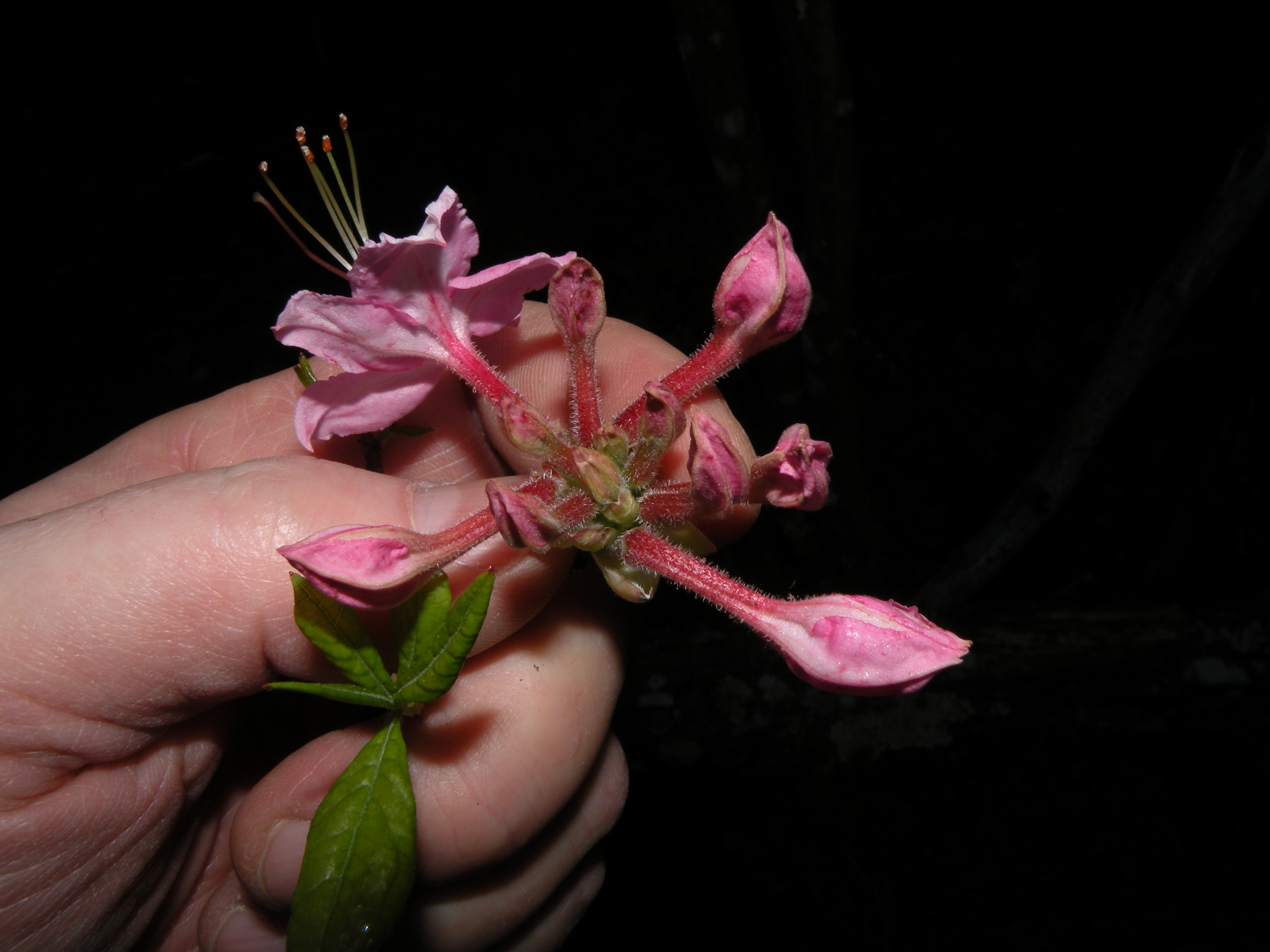

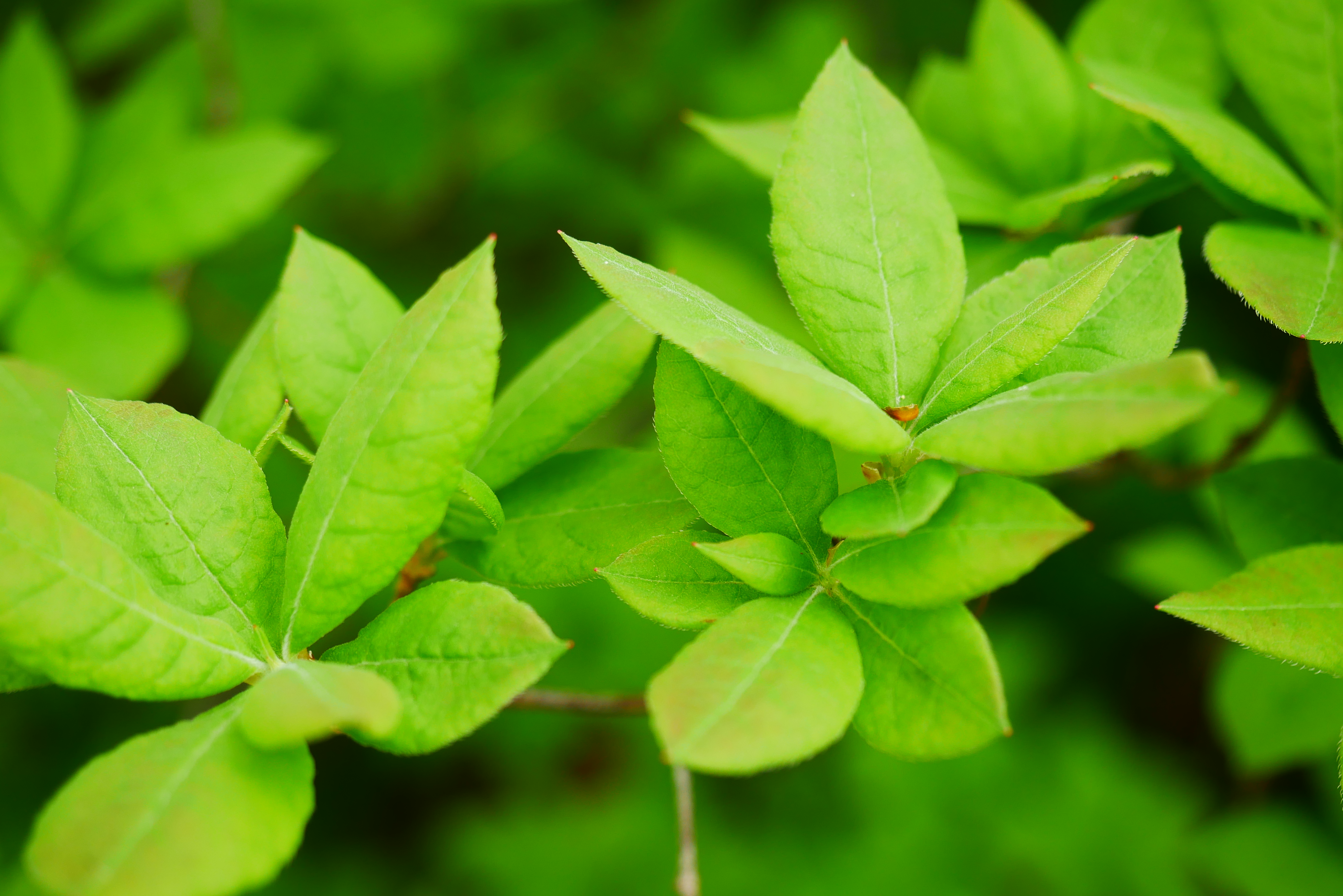

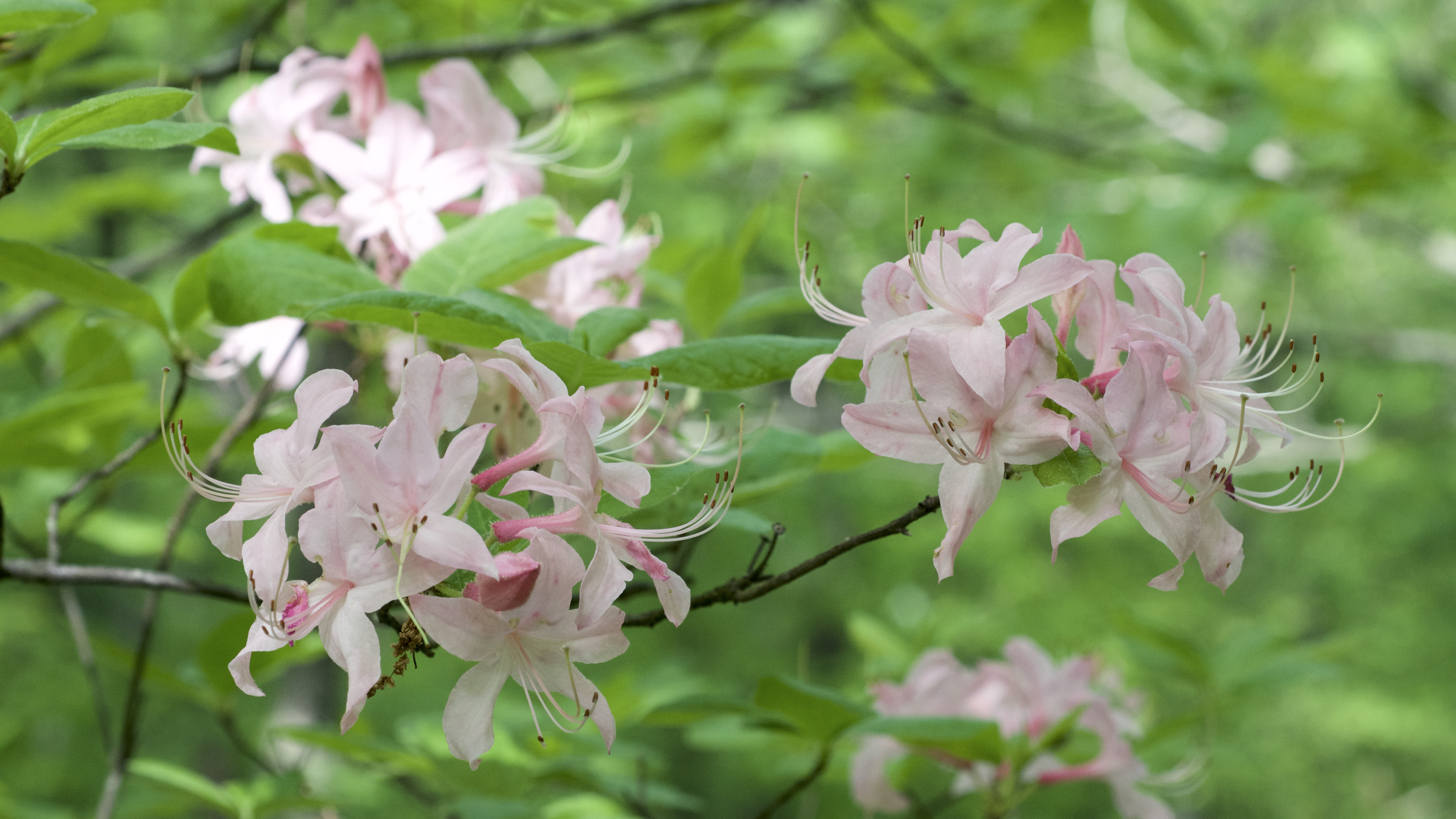
