= Laneville High School =

Location
- 7415 West FM 1798; Laneville, Texas 75667-0127; United States; 31.973697°N 94.816632°W

Information
- School type: Public High School
- School district: Laneville Independent School District
- Principal: Carolyn Reeves
- Staff: 16.85 (FTE)
- Grades: PK-12
- Enrollment: 140 (2023–2024)
- Student to teacher ratio: 8.31
- Colors: Orange & Black
- Athletics conference: UIL Class A
- Mascot: Yellow Jacket
- Website: Laneville High School

Laneville High School or Laneville School is a 1A public high school located in unincorporated Laneville, Texas (USA). It is part of the Laneville Independent School District located in south central Rusk County. In 2011, the school was rated "Academically Acceptable" by the Texas Education Agency.

== Athletics ==
The Laneville Yellow Jackets compete in the following sports:

- Basketball
- Track and Field

=== State Titles ===
- Boys Basketball -
  - 1992(1A), 1993(1A), 2008(1A/D1)

==== State Finalists ====
- Boys Basketball –
  - 1952(D3), 2007(1A/D2) 2014(1A)
