= Laneville, Texas =

Unincorporated community in Rusk County, Texas, United States

Laneville
- Unincorporated community
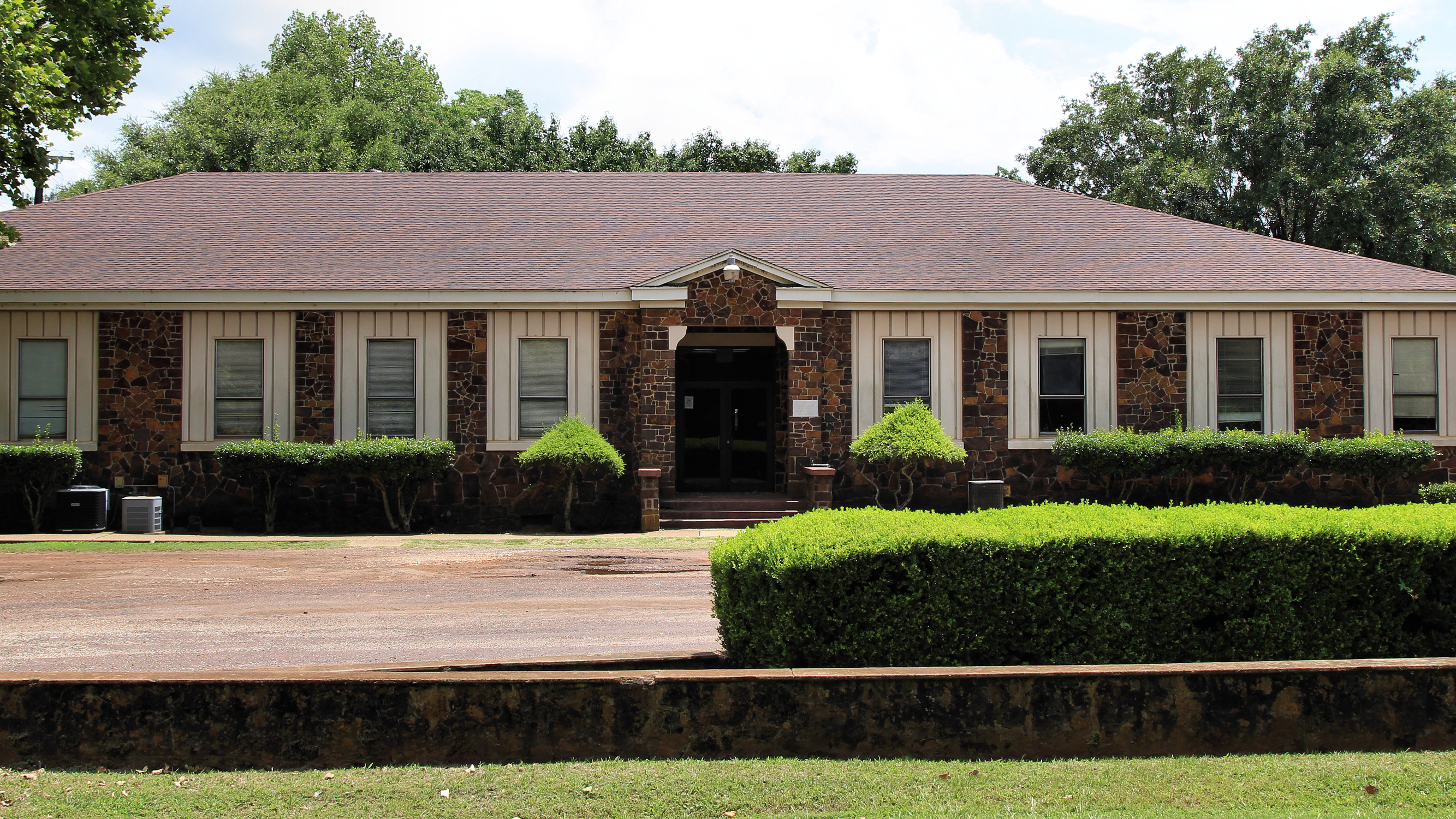
- Laneville School building, June 2019

- Location within the state of Texas Laneville (the United States)
- Coordinates: 31°58′28″N 94°48′50″W
- Country: United States
- State: Texas
- County: Rusk
- Elevation: 436 ft (133 m)
- Time zone: UTC-6 (Central (CST))
  - Summer (DST): UTC-5 (CDT)
- ZIP code: 75667
- Area codes: 430 and 903
- GNIS feature ID: 1339614

Laneville is an unincorporated community in south central Rusk County, Texas, United States. According to the Handbook of Texas, the community had a population of 200 in 2000. It is located within the Longview, Texas metropolitan area.

== History ==
The town came into being as a crossroads community in the 1880s. The intersection of four "lanes" furnished the town's name. This area was settled by wealthy men who enjoyed the redlands and encouraged other people to avoid sandy spots. The town was granted a post office in 1888 with Philetus Williamson as its first postmaster. It is currently one of only 14 post offices operating in the county since 1950. Its population was 171 in 1904 and went down to 108 in 1925. The population boomed to 320 when the East Texas Oil Field came in the early 1930s and had 16 businesses in operation. This boom was short-lived, but Laneville still had several stores and sawmills, three churches, and a cotton gin. Its population was 200 from the 1950s through 2000 and had ten businesses in 1990. This went up to 20 businesses in 2000.

== Geography ==
Laneville is located at the intersection of FMs 225 and 1798 near the Angelina River, 12 mi (19 km) south of Henderson and 12 mi (19 km) northwest of Mount Enterprise in south-central Rusk County.

== Education ==
The community of Laneville is served by the Laneville Independent School District and is home to the Laneville High School Yellow Jackets. It had two schools at one point.

== Notable person ==
- Mark Moseley, former professional football player, was born in Laneville.

== See also ==
- List of unincorporated communities in Texas
