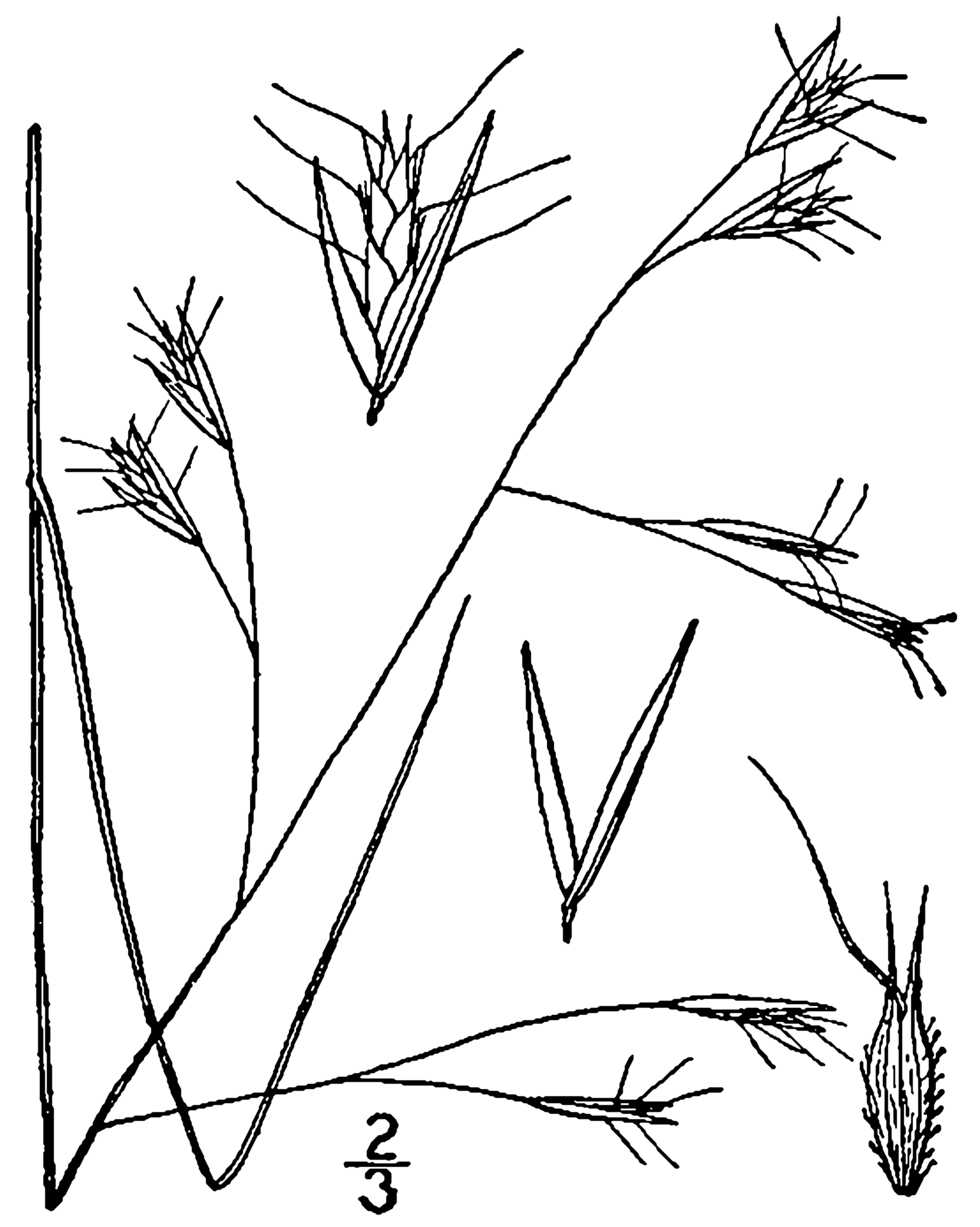

Conservation status
- Secure (NatureServe)

Scientific classification
- Kingdom: Plantae
- Clade: Tracheophytes
- Clade: Angiosperms
- Clade: Monocots
- Clade: Commelinids
- Order: Poales
- Family: Poaceae
- Genus: Danthonia
- Species: D. compressa

Binomial name
- Danthonia compressa Austin

= Danthonia compressa =

Species of grass

Danthonia compressa is a species of grass known by the common names mountain oatgrass, flattened oatgrass, and slender oatgrass.

== Distribution ==
This bunchgrass is native to eastern North America, where it can be found in eastern Canada and the Eastern United States. In the southern part of its range it is restricted to the high elevations of the Appalachian Mountains.

== Description ==
Danthonia compressa is a perennial bunchgrass with thin, compressed stems reaching up to about 80 centimeters in length, sometimes lying decumbent. Most of the leaves are located at the bases of the stems. The inflorescence is a panicle of up to 17 spikelets, with two or three per branch. The spikelet has a short, bent awn. The grass reproduces by seed and by sprouting new stems from buds on the stem bases.

== Ecology ==
This bunchgrass grows in oak and hickory forests, woods, and meadows. It is a common grass on grassy balds in the southern Appalachians, where it occurs with redtop (Agrostis gigantea), timothy (Phleum pratense), Canada bluegrass (Poa compressa), Kentucky bluegrass (P. pratensis), red fescue (Festuca rubra), five-fingers (Potentilla canadensis), and sheep sorrel (Rumex acetosella). It is a dominant species in the Great Smoky Mountains. It sometimes grows as a weed in crop fields.
