= Roots, Pennsylvania =

Unincorporated community in Pennsylvania, US

- Census-designated place
- Location within Pennsylvania Location within the United States
- Coordinates: 40°36′49″N 78°21′55″W
- Country: United States
- State: Pennsylvania
- County: Blair
- Township: Antis

Area
  - Total: 0.10 sq mi (0.27 km^{2})
  - Land: 0.10 sq mi (0.27 km^{2})
  - Water: 0 sq mi (0.00 km^{2})
- Elevation: 1,224 ft (373 m)

Population (2020)
  - Total: 101
  - Density: 982.5/sq mi (379.34/km^{2})
- Time zone: UTC-5 (Eastern (EST))
  - Summer (DST): UTC-4 (EDT)
- ZIP Code: 16686 (Tyrone)
- Area codes: 814/582
- FIPS code: 42-66004
- GNIS feature ID: 2805553

Roots is an unincorporated community and census-designated place (CDP) in Blair County, Pennsylvania, United States. It was first listed as a CDP prior to the 2020 census.

== Geography ==
The CDP is in northwestern Blair County, in the center of Antis Township. It sits on Pennsylvania Route 865, which leads southeast 1.6 miles (2.6 km) to Bellwood and northwest up the Allegheny Front 6 miles (10 km) to Blandburg. Roots is on the north side of Bells Gap Run, which flows southeast off the Allegheny Front and joins the Little Juniata River at Bellwood.

== Demographics ==
Historical population
Census	Pop.	Note	%±
2020	101		—
U.S. Decennial Census

== Education ==
The school district is Bellwood-Antis School District.
