= Reightown, Pennsylvania =

Unincorporated community in Pennsylvania, US

- Census-designated place
- Location within Pennsylvania Location within the United States
- Coordinates: 40°36′08″N 78°20′39″W
- Country: United States
- State: Pennsylvania
- County: Blair
- Township: Antis

Area
  - Total: 0.24 sq mi (0.63 km^{2})
  - Land: 0.24 sq mi (0.62 km^{2})
  - Water: 0.0039 sq mi (0.01 km^{2})
- Elevation: 1,116 ft (340 m)

Population (2020)
  - Total: 378
  - Density: 1,570.4/sq mi (606.35/km^{2})
- Time zone: UTC-5 (Eastern (EST))
  - Summer (DST): UTC-4 (EDT)
- ZIP Codes: 16686 (Tyrone); 16617 (Bellwood)
- Area codes: 814/582
- FIPS code: 42-64080
- GNIS feature ID: 2805550

Reightown is an unincorporated community and census-designated place (CDP) in Blair County, Pennsylvania, United States. It was first listed as a CDP prior to the 2020 census.

The CDP is in northern Blair County, in the central part of Antis Township. It is bordered to the north and east by the borough of Bellwood, and the city of Altoona is 7 miles (11 km) to the southwest. Reightown sits in the valley of Bells Gap Run, which rises on the Allegheny Front and flows southeast to the Little Juniata River at Bellwood.

== Demographics ==
Historical population
Census	Pop.	Note	%±
2020	378		—
U.S. Decennial Census

== Education ==
The school district is Bellwood-Antis School District.
