= Jennie Margaret Gheer =

American missionary and educator

Jean "Jennie" Margaret Gheer (November 13, 1846 – June 20, 1910) was an American missionary and educator. In 1879, at the age of 33, she was sent by the Woman's Foreign Missionary Society of the Methodist Episcopal Church to Japan. She founded Eiwa Jo Gakko in Fukuoka in 1885, the origin of Fukuoka Jo Gakko and Fukuoka Jo Gakuin, an educational institution for girls and women that flourishes to this day.

== Early life and education ==
Gheer was born in Bellwood, Pennsylvania. Her father was a furniture merchant. She graduated from Millersville State Normal School and worked as a public school teacher in Antis, Tyrone, and Altoona in Blair County.

== Career ==
Gheer was a participant in the New York City branch of the Woman's Foreign Missionary Society of the Methodist Episcopal Church (WFMS), and developed an interest in foreign mission.

In October 1879, she was assigned to Nagasaki, Japan. After meeting Elizabeth Russell from the Cincinnati branch, the two women sailed from San Francisco for Nagasaki, via Yokohama, on October 25, 1879, reaching their destination on November 23, 1879. WFMS initially assigned them to Kolkata, India, but two weeks before their scheduled departure, they were suddenly reassigned to Japan. At the time, Gheer was 33 and Russell 43 years old, and they knew almost nothing about each other, or about Japan.

The two women were cordially received at the port of Nagasaki by John Carrol Davidson and his wife, who had been sent there by the American Episcopal Methodist Church in 1873 when the edict prohibiting Christianity was abolished by the Meiji Government. Davidson had built a Methodist church in Dejima in 1876 and sent a letter to WFMS requesting two female missionaries to establish a girls’ school.

Shortly thereafter, Russell founded a mission school for girls in the foreign settlement in Higashi-Yamate, Nagasaki on December 1, 1879. Although there was only one student in 1879–80, the number increased to 18 in 1881 when the school was named Kwassui Jo Gakko, and 43 in 1882 when the school building was rebuilt. Gheer encouraged and supported Russell during these days. Gheer was talented at teaching the Old Testament, the New Testament, and music such as singing, playing the organ, and piano.

In 1884, the first Methodist church was built in the city of Fukuoka, and Russell or Gheer had to move there to establish a girls’ school. Being missed, Gheer eventually left Nagasaki. On June 15, 1885, Gheer opened a girls’ school, called Eiwa Jo Gakko, the origin of Fukuoka Jo Gakko, established in 1919 and Fukuoka Jo Gakuin Junior and Senior High School, established in 1947 and 1948, respectively. Gheer took leave from her job as the first principal in 1888 due to illness, returning to Japan in 1890. She stayed and worked in Japan for most of the following 20 years until 1910 when she returned to the States because of serious illness. She traveled all over Kyushu and Okinawa to train evangelists. She set up orphanages, kindergartens for the poor, and Sunday schools for illiteracy, health, and vocational training for women.

== Personal life ==
Gheer had adopted a baby girl in 1880, named Elisaberta Forrsell, whose mother had died shortly after her birth. The father, a Finnish officer on a Russian ship, had been seriously injured in a fall, and died a year after the injury. The child, nicknamed Lisa, returned to the U.S. with Gheer, and later entered the Curtis Institute of Music in Philadelphia.

== Death ==
Gheer returned to the United States on May 17, 1910. Hearing the severity of the illness, her brother Thomas P Gheer managed to reserve a private train compartment from Seattle to her sister Anna's home in Bellwood, Pennsylvania on June 13, 1910, where she died a week later, on June 20, 1910, at the age of 63.

== See also ==
- Fukuoka Jo Gakuin University
- Kwassui Women's University
