= Pennsylvania Route 865 =

State highway in Pennsylvania, US

Pennsylvania Route 865

Route information
- Maintained by PennDOT
- Length: 19.088 mi (30.719 km)

Major junctions
- South end: I-99 / US 220 in Bellwood
- US 220 Bus. in Bellwood; PA 253 in Reade Township
- North end: PA 53 in Coalport

Location
- Country: United States
- State: Pennsylvania
- Counties: Blair, Cambria, Clearfield

Highway system
- Pennsylvania State Route System; Interstate; US; State; Scenic; Legislative
← PA 864	→ PA 866

Pennsylvania Route 865 (PA 865) is a 19.1-mile-long (30.7 km) state highway located in Blair, Cambria, and Clearfield counties in Pennsylvania. The southern terminus is at Interstate 99 (I-99)/U.S. Route 220 (US 220) in Bellwood. The northern terminus is at PA 53 in Coalport.

== Route description ==
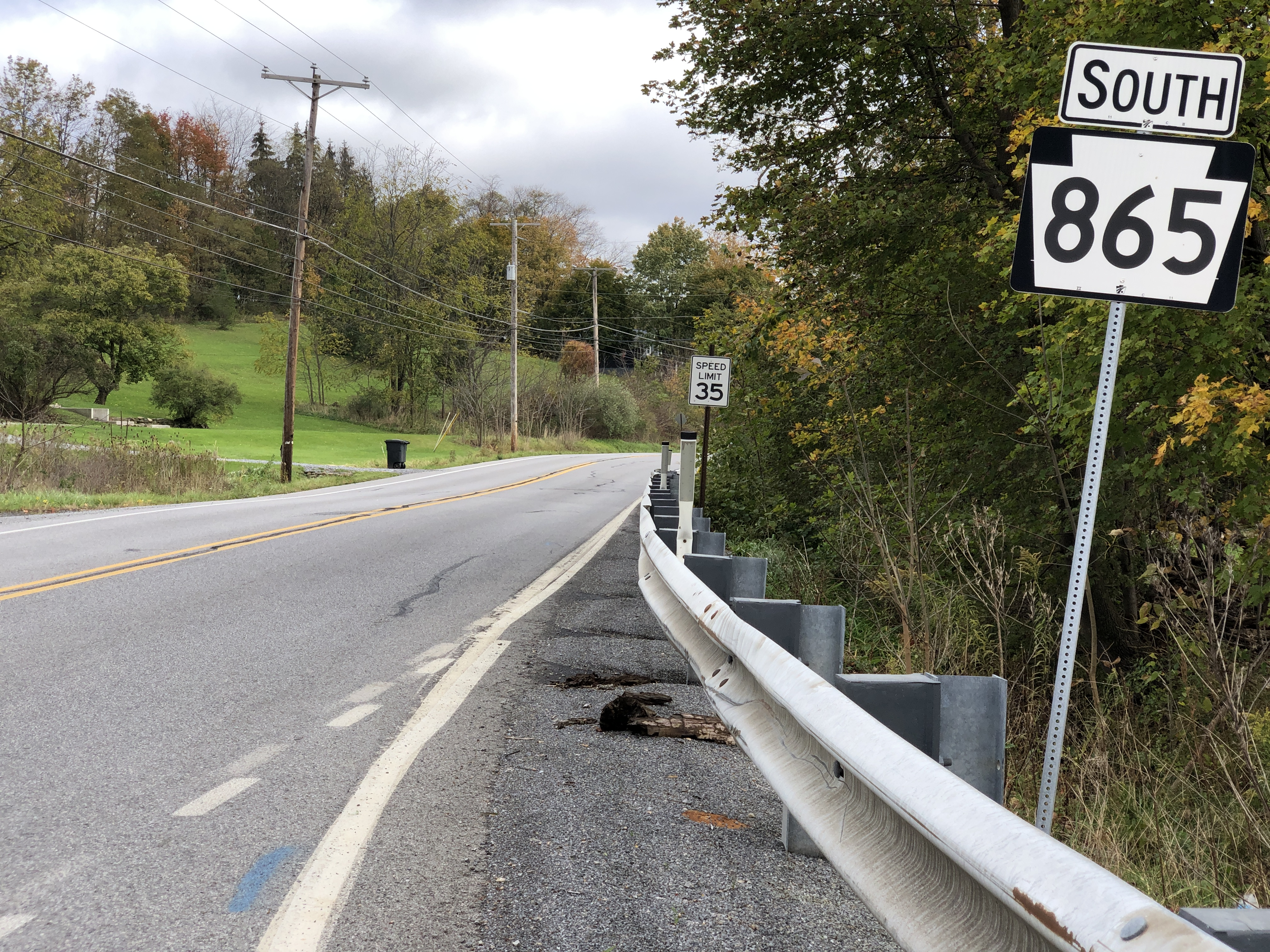
PA 865 southbound in Antis Township

PA 865 begins at an interchange with I-99/US 220 in Antis Township, Blair County, heading west on Old U.S. 220, a two-lane divided highway. The road runs through wooded areas and crosses Little Juniata River, coming to an intersection with US 220 Business. Past this intersection, the route becomes two-lane undivided Campbells Lane and passes homes and a few businesses, heading into the borough of Bellwood. Here, PA 865 becomes East Logan Street and heads west-northwest past residences, turning west and passing over Norfolk Southern's Pittsburgh Line. The route turns northwest onto North Tuckahoe Street and runs past more homes along with a few commercial establishments. The road heads back into Antis Township and continues through rural residential areas, passing through Roots Crossing. PA 865 passes a few forested fields before passing Bellwood Reservoir and heading into densely forested areas, turning to the north.

PA 865 enters Reade Township in Cambria County and becomes Skyline Drive, continuing north through more forests and passing through Lloydville. The road turns to the southwest and runs through the residential community of Blandburg before heading through more wooded areas with some fields and homes, curving north again. The route passes through Mountaindale and heads northwest, coming to an intersection with PA 253 in Glasgow. At this point, PA 253 turns northwest to form a concurrency with PA 865, passing a few homes. PA 253 splits from PA 865 by turning east onto Executive Drive, with PA 865 winding northwest through woodland with a few agricultural clearings. PA 865 continues into Beccaria Township in Clearfield County and becomes Heverly Boulevard, heading north through more woods with occasional farm fields. After passing through Utahville, the route turns to the west and heads through forested areas, passing through Heverly. Farther west, PA 865 reaches its northern terminus at an intersection with PA 53 on the southern border of the borough of Coalport.

== Major intersections ==
County	Location	mi	km	Destinations	Notes
Blair	Antis Township	0.000– 0.175	0.000– 0.282	I-99 / US 220 / Skelp Mountain Road (SR 1008) – Tyrone, Altoona, Skelp	Exit 41 (I-99/US 220); southern terminus
Blair	Antis Township	0.316	0.509	US 220 Bus. (East Pleasant Valley Boulevard) – Tyrone, Altoona	
Cambria	Reade Township	12.057	19.404	PA 253 south (Executive Drive) – Van Ormer, Prince Gallitzin State Park	South end of PA 253 overlap
Cambria	Reade Township	12.462	20.056	PA 253 north (Executive Drive) / Roseland Road (SR 1022) – Allemans	North end of PA 253 overlap
Clearfield	Coalport	19.088	30.719	PA 53 (North Glendale Boulevard/Main Street) – Cresson, Philipsburg	Northern terminus
1.000 mi = 1.609 km; 1.000 km = 0.621 mi: Concurrency terminus
