= Fostoria =

Fostoria may refer to:

- Fostoria Glass Company 1887-1990s
- Fostoria dhimbangunmal, a dinosaur

Places in the United States:

- Fostoria, Iowa
- Fostoria, Kansas
- Fostoria, Michigan
- Fostoria, Ohio
- Fostoria, Pennsylvania
