= Tipton, Pennsylvania =

Unincorporated community in Pennsylvania, US

- Census-designated place
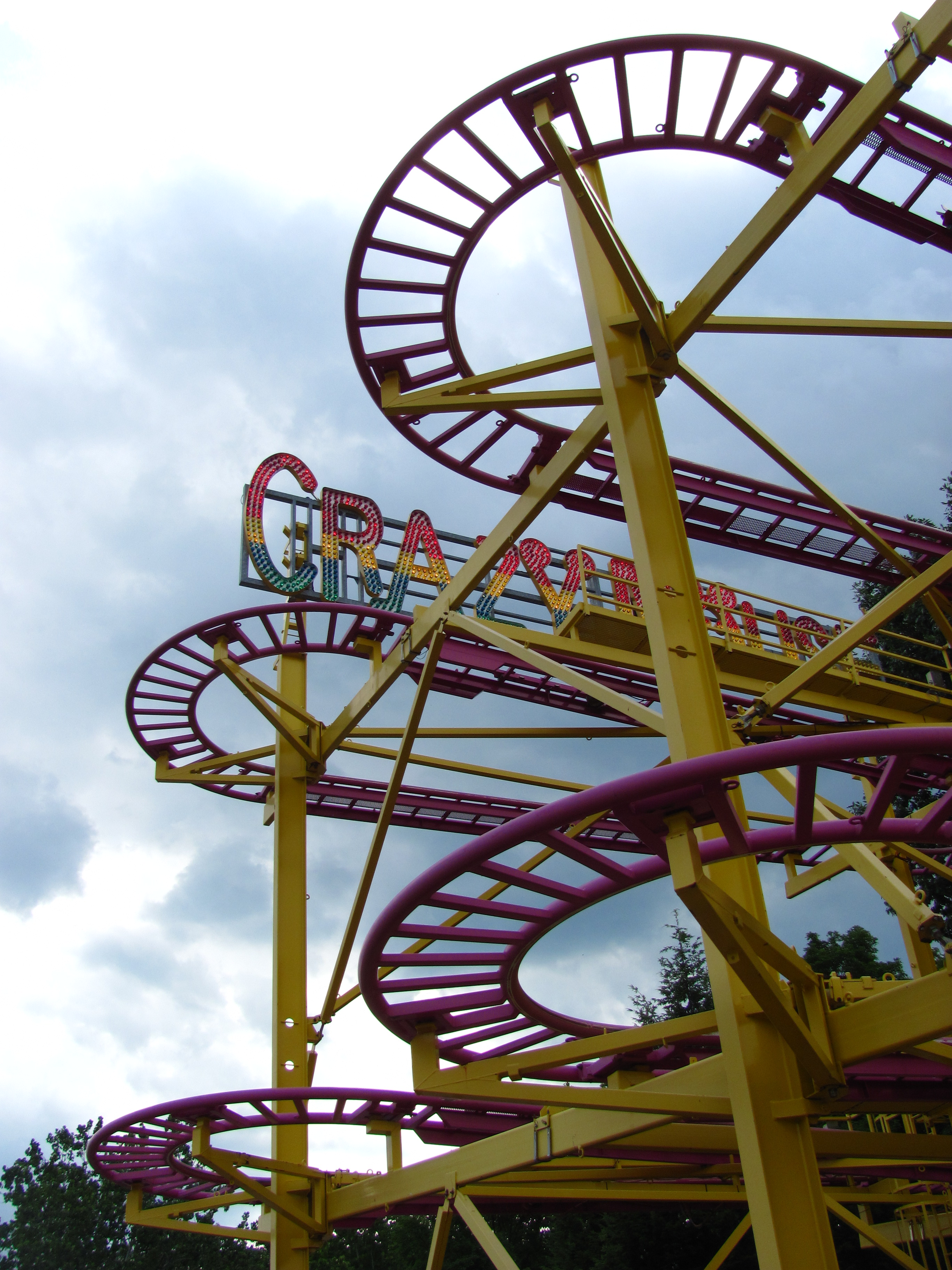
- Crazy Mouse ride at DelGrosso's Amusement Park

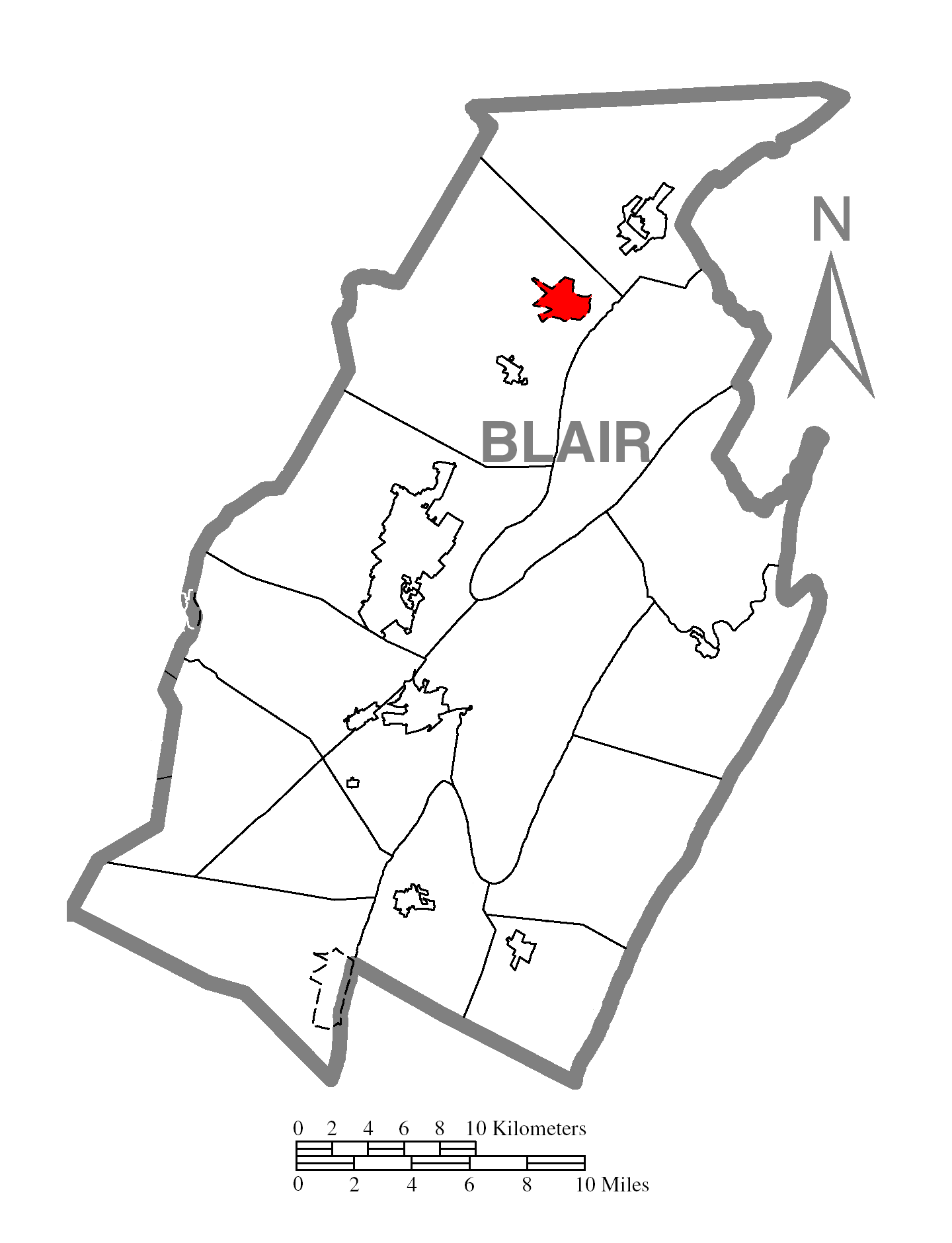
- Location within Blair County

- Location within the U.S. state of Pennsylvania
- Coordinates: 40°38′8″N 78°17′53″W
- Country: United States
- State: Pennsylvania
- County: Blair
- Township: Antis

Area
  - Total: 1.02 sq mi (2.64 km^{2})
  - Land: 1.02 sq mi (2.64 km^{2})
  - Water: 0.00 sq mi (0 km^{2})
- Elevation: 997 ft (304 m)

Population (2020)
  - Total: 826
  - Density: 808.9/sq mi (312.32/km^{2})
- Time zone: UTC-5 (Eastern (EST))
  - Summer (DST): UTC-4 (EDT)
- ZIP code: 16684
- Area code: 814
- FIPS code: 42-76880
- GNIS feature ID: 2390393

Tipton is a census-designated place (CDP) in Antis Township, Blair County, Pennsylvania, United States. The population was 1,083 at the 2010 census. It was a stop on the former Pennsylvania Railroad Main Line between Tyrone and Altoona.

== Geography ==
According to the United States Census Bureau, the CDP has a total area of 1.9 square miles (4.9 km^{2}), all land.

There are four unique sections to the Tipton area. The Poe, The Pellegrine, The Noel, and The Tilly regions, all named after the first settlers in the area. The Poe region consists of the north-eastern area, the Pellegrine region consists of the southern houses and apartments, and the Noel region consists of a small portion of land to the north-western area in which notable landmarks, such as the Tipton Recreation Center, are located. The Tilly region overlaps with the other three regions, and consists of most of the factory and manufacturing buildings.

== Demographics ==
Historical population
Census	Pop.	Note	%±
2020	826		—
U.S. Decennial Census

As of the census of 2000, there were 1,225 people, 463 households, and 356 families residing in the CDP. The population density was 663.9 inhabitants per square mile (256.3/km^{2}). There were 478 housing units at an average density of 259.1 per square mile (100.0/km^{2}). The racial makeup of the CDP was 99.10% White, 0.16% African American, 0.41% Native American, and 0.33% from two or more races. Hispanic or Latino of any race were 0.33% of the population.

There were 463 households, out of which 33.5% had children under the age of 18 living with them, 67.4% were married couples living together, 5.6% had a female householder with no husband present, and 23.1% were non-families. 19.2% of all households were made up of individuals, and 8.9% had someone living alone who was 65 years of age or older. The average household size was 2.65 and the average family size was 3.03.

In the CDP, the population was spread out, with 23.8% under the age of 18, 7.3% from 18 to 24, 28.7% from 25 to 44, 25.0% from 45 to 64, and 15.2% who were 65 years of age or older. The median age was 40 years. For every 100 females, there were 100.8 males. For every 100 females age 18 and over, there were 101.9 males.

The median income for a household in the CDP was $51,250, and the median income for a family was $59,100. Males had a median income of $37,596 versus $28,359 for females. The per capita income for the CDP was $21,320. About 6.0% of families and 12.0% of the population were below the poverty line, including 19.9% of those under age 18 and 13.5% of those age 65 or over.

== Education ==
The school district is Bellwood-Antis School District.
