= Fostoria, Pennsylvania =

Unincorporated community in Pennsylvania, US

- Census-designated place
- Location within Pennsylvania Location within the United States
- Coordinates: 40°37′6″N 78°19′14″W
- Country: United States
- State: Pennsylvania
- County: Blair
- Township: Antis

Area
  - Total: 0.081 sq mi (0.21 km^{2})
  - Land: 0.081 sq mi (0.21 km^{2})
  - Water: 0 sq mi (0.00 km^{2})
- Elevation: 1,011 ft (308 m)

Population (2020)
  - Total: 36
  - Density: 443.7/sq mi (171.31/km^{2})
- Time zone: UTC-5 (Eastern (EST))
  - Summer (DST): UTC-4 (EDT)
- ZIP Code: 16686 (Tyrone)
- Area codes: 814/582
- FIPS code: 42-26976
- GNIS feature ID: 2805499

Fostoria is an unincorporated community and census-designated place (CDP) in Blair County, Pennsylvania, United States. It was first listed as a CDP prior to the 2020 census.

The CDP is in northern Blair County, in the eastern part of Antis Township. It is bordered to the east by the Little Juniata River and to the west by the Pittsburgh Line of the Norfolk Southern Railway. Fostoria is 1.5 miles (2.4 km) north of Bellwood and 6 miles (10 km) southwest of Tyrone.

== Demographics ==
Historical population
Census	Pop.	Note	%±
2020	36		—
U.S. Decennial Census

== Education ==
The school district is Bellwood-Antis School District.
