= Pinecroft, Pennsylvania =

Unincorporated community in Pennsylvania, US

- Census-designated place
- Location within Pennsylvania Location within the United States
- Coordinates: 40°33′56″N 78°21′07″W
- Country: United States
- State: Pennsylvania
- County: Blair
- Township: Antis

Area
  - Total: 0.24 sq mi (0.63 km^{2})
  - Land: 0.24 sq mi (0.63 km^{2})
  - Water: 0 sq mi (0.00 km^{2})
- Elevation: 1,129 ft (344 m)

Population (2020)
  - Total: 300
  - Density: 1,240.2/sq mi (478.83/km^{2})
- Time zone: UTC-5 (Eastern (EST))
  - Summer (DST): UTC-4 (EDT)
- ZIP Code: 16601 (Altoona)
- Area codes: 814/582
- FIPS code: 42-60384
- GNIS feature ID: 2805542

Pinecroft is an unincorporated community and census-designated place (CDP) in Blair County, Pennsylvania, United States. It was first listed as a CDP prior to the 2020 census.

The CDP is in north-central Blair County, in the southern part of Antis Township. It is 4 miles (6 km) north of Altoona, the county's largest city. The Little Juniata River runs along the northwestern edge of the CDP.

== Demographics ==
Historical population
Census	Pop.	Note	%±
2020	300		—
U.S. Decennial Census

== Education ==
The school district is Bellwood-Antis School District.
