= Elizabeth Russell (missionary) =

American missionary (1836–1928)

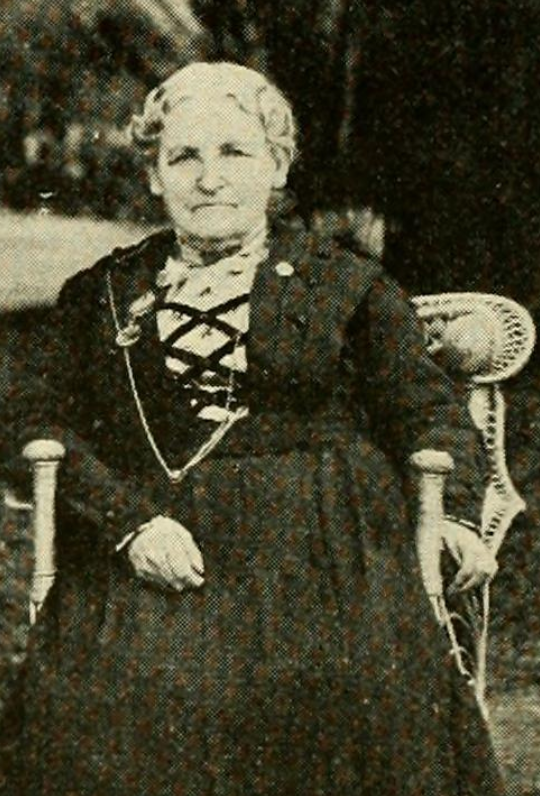
- Born: October 9, 1836; Cadiz, Ohio
- Died: September 6, 1928 (aged 91); Ohio
- Occupations: Christian missionary in Japan, educator

Elizabeth Russell (October 9, 1836 – September 6, 1928) was an American missionary and educator. She founded Kwassui Gakuin, a school for girls and women in Nagasaki. She was sent by the Woman's Foreign Missionary Society of the Methodist Episcopal Church to Japan in 1879 at the age of forty-three. She contributed to the women's education, social welfare and missionary during her forty years in Japan, and was decorated by the Emperor of Japan in 1919.

== Early life and education ==
Elizabeth Russell was born in Cadiz, Ohio. Her father was a millwright. In 1859 when she was 23 years old, Russell graduated from Washington Female Seminary.

After graduation, Russell was a teacher for about ten years, including during the American Civil War. In her late thirties, she attended a Methodist revival camp, and decided to be a missionary. While continuing to teach, Russell became the secretary of the Woman's Foreign Missionary Society of the Methodist Episcopal Church (WFMS), West Virginia conference. After several years in the WFMS, Russell came to think she should personally go abroad for mission. Russell and another teacher named Jennie Gheer sailed from San Francisco for Japan, on October 25, 1879, via Yokohama, reaching Nagasaki on November 23, 1879. In 1873 when the edict prohibiting Christianity was abolished by the Meiji Government, the American Episcopal Methodist Church had already sent John Carrol Davidson to Nagasaki. Davidson built a Methodist church in Dejima in 1876 and sent a request to WFMS for two female educational missionaries. Russell founded a mission school for girls and women in the foreign settlement in Higashi-Yamate, Nagasaki on December 1, 1879. Number of students increased from one in 1879–80, to eighteen in 1881, and forty-three in 1882. The purpose of Russell's school's curriculum was to train independent career women as well as homemakers and mothers. In addition to being the principal at Kwassui, Russell adopted a Japanese baby girl, named May in 1885. May was sent to the States when she was eleven. When May graduated from Ohio Wesleyan University in 1910, she returned to Japan to help Russell. Russell also founded Kwassui Girl's home in Kumamoto, for children left without parents after natural disasters. In addition, Russell set up a seaman's home for sailors entering the Nagasaki's port in order to keep them away from “entertainment areas” during their stay in Nagasaki. She retired from the principal at the age of sixty-two, she stayed at Kwassui Gakuin.

== Awards and honors ==
She was awarded the Japanese emperor's blue ribbon medal in 1919.

== Personal life ==
At age of eighty-two, Russell and May returned to the US. May died from tuberculosis when she was thirty-nine, and Russell died in 1928 at her sister's house in Ohio.

== See also ==
Kwassui Women's University
