= Steve Hatfield =

Canadian football player (1924–2007)

Profile
- Position: Halfback

Personal information
- Born: January 4, 1924; Bellwood, Pennsylvania, U.S.
- Died: March 31, 2007 (aged 83); Lower Saucon Township, Pennsylvania, U.S.
- Listed height: 6 ft 0 in (1.83 m)
- Listed weight: 197 lb (89 kg)

Career information
- High school: Bellwood
- College: Shippensburg (PA)
- NFL draft: 1950: 17th round, 215th overall pick

Career history
- 1951: Ottawa Rough Riders

Awards and highlights
- Grey Cup champion (1951)

Stephen F. Hatfield (January 4, 1924 – March 31, 2007) was an American professional football player who played for the Ottawa Rough Riders. In 1951, he was a member of the Ottawa Rough Riders team that won the Grey Cup that season.

He previously played football at and attended the Shippensburg University of Pennsylvania. In 1950, Hatfield was drafted by the New York Giants of the National Football League (NFL). He is a member of the Shippensburg Raiders Hall of Fame.

He died in 2007.
