= Fukuoka Jo Gakuin University =

Private women's college in Minami-ku, Fukuoka, Japan

Coordinates: 33°32′00″N 130°26′29″E

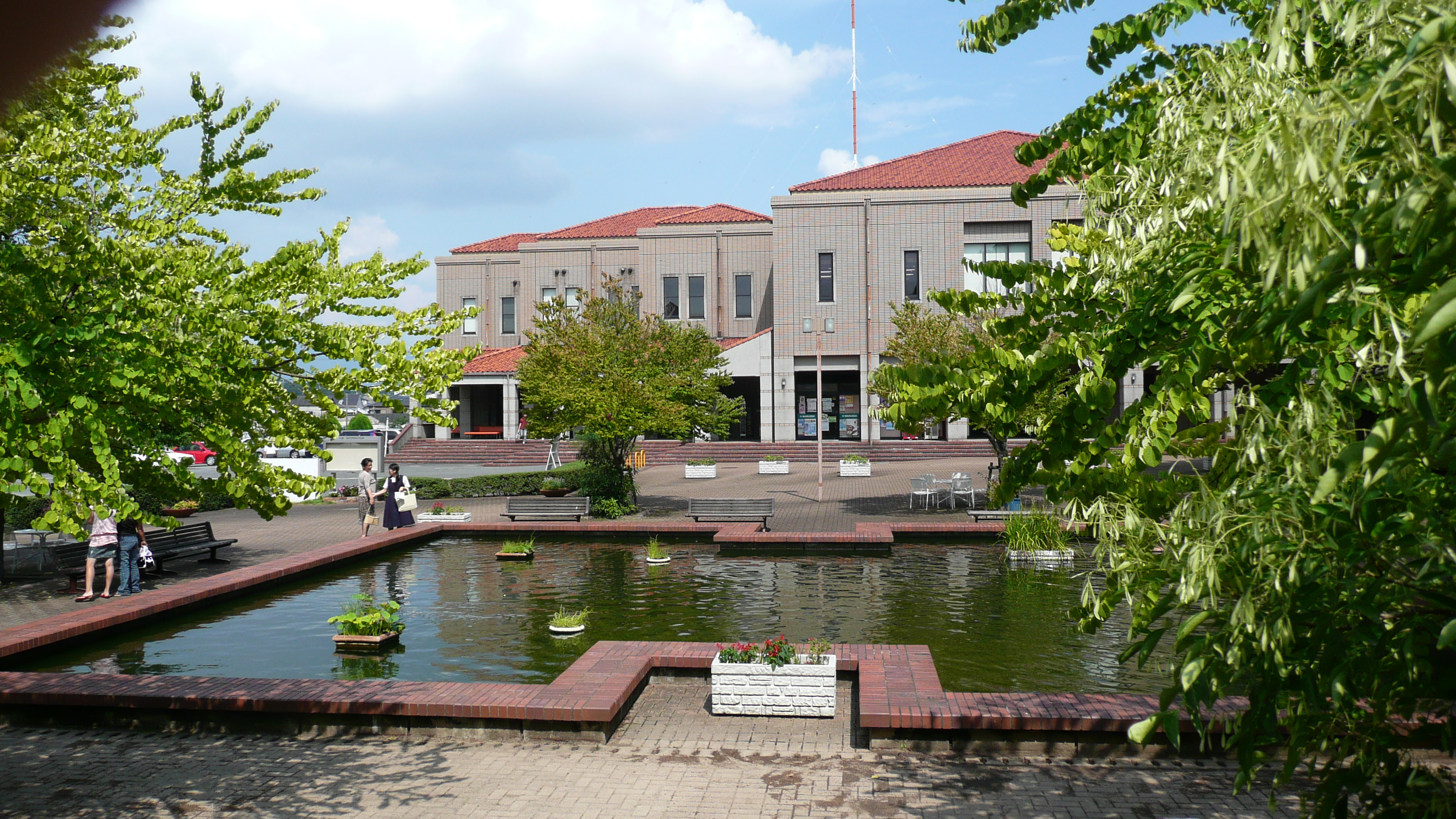
Fukuoka Jo Gakuin University

Fukuoka Jo Gakuin University (福岡女学院大学, Fukuoka jo gakuin daigaku) is a private women's college in Minami-ku, Fukuoka, Japan. The predecessor of the school was founded in 1885 by American Methodist Missionary Jean "Jennie" Margaret Gheer. It was chartered as a junior women's college in 1964, and it became a four-year college in 1990.
