= Roaring Plains West Wilderness =

Wilderness area in West Virginia, United States

- IUCN category Ib (wilderness area)
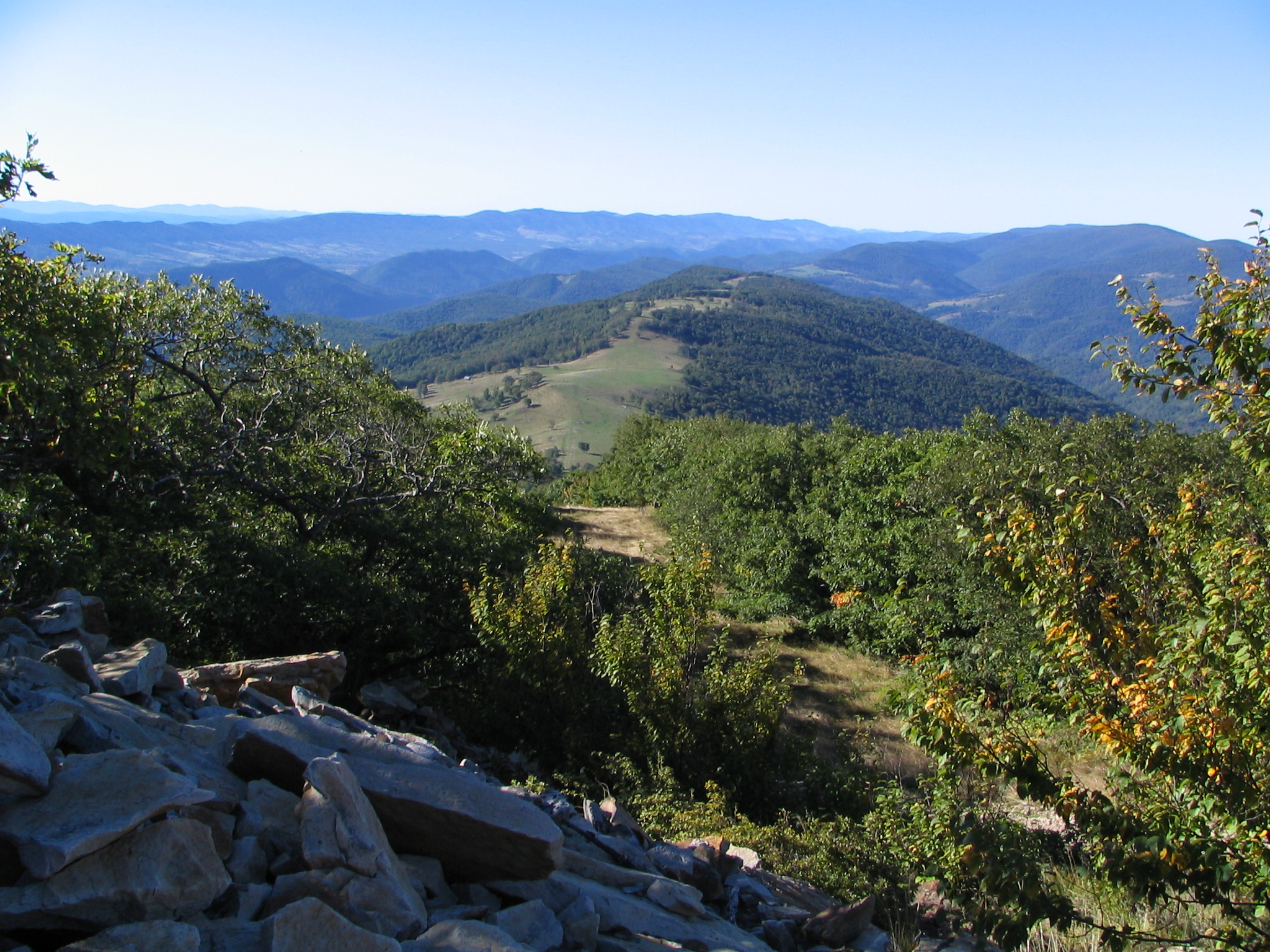
- Roaring Plains

- Location within West Virginia
- Location: West Virginia, United States
- Coordinates: 38°56′17″N 79°25′56″W
- Area: 6,792 acres (27.49 km^{2})
- Elevation: 4,027 ft (1,227 m)
- Max. elevation: 4,770
- Established: 2009
- Operator: Monongahela National Forest

The Roaring Plains West Wilderness is a U.S. Wilderness Area in the Allegheny Mountains of eastern West Virginia, USA. It is part of the Monongahela National Forest and includes Mount Porte Crayon, the sixth highest point in the state.

Known as "Roaring Plains West" to the advocates of a much larger area (15,138 acres) of proposed wilderness preservation, the RPW consists of 6,820 acres (27.6 km^{2}) set aside by the Wild Monongahela Act, which was made law on 30 March 2009. (There are also areas known as "Roaring Plains North" and "Roaring Plains East" not included in the WMA.) Along with neighboring Flatrock Plains, these areas comprise the highest plateau in the eastern United States.

== Geography ==
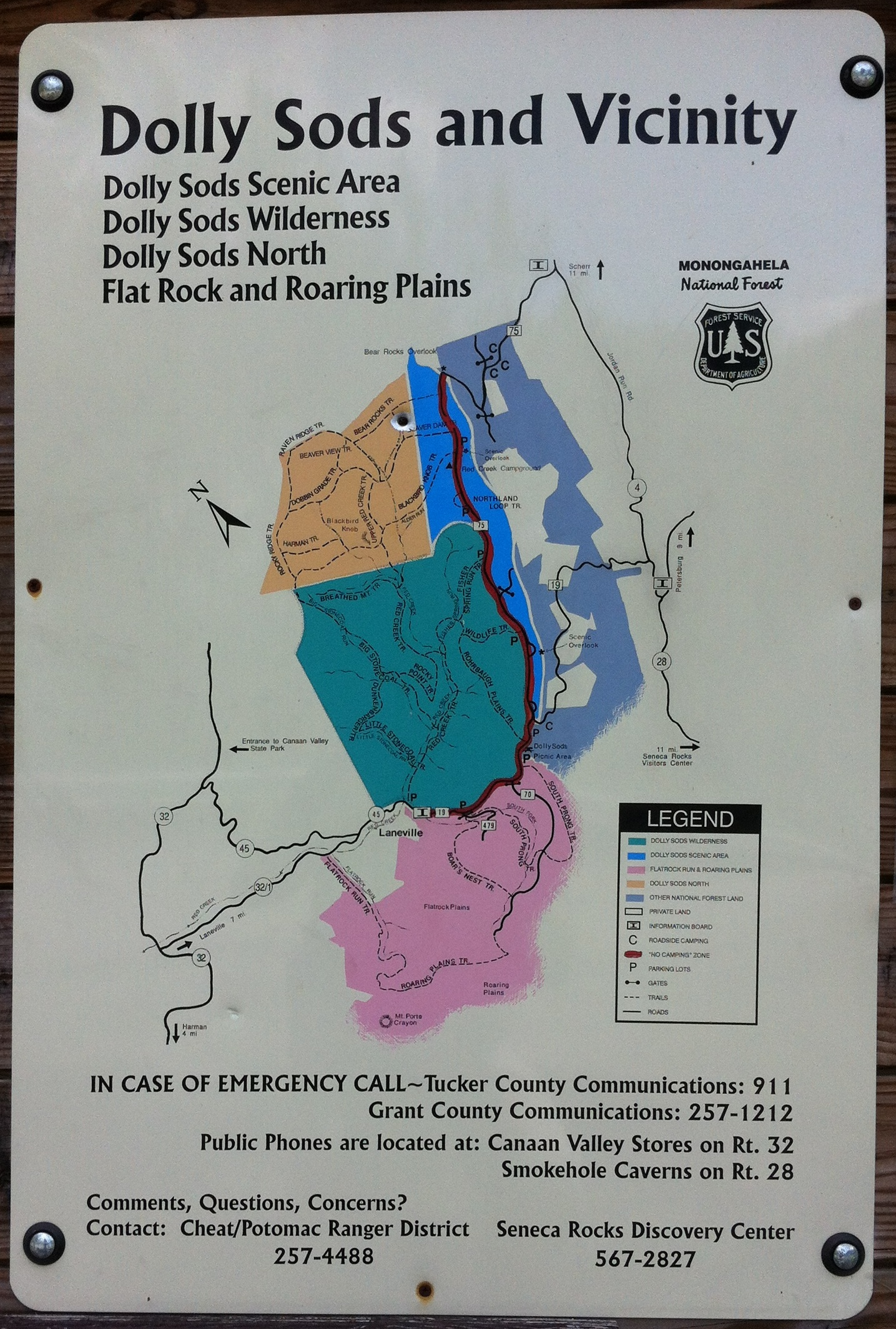

The Roaring Plains and Flatrock Plains areas include portions of Randolph and Pendleton counties. These high-elevation plateaux, which encompass the highest sphagnum bogs in West Virginia, consist of vast expanses of rocky, tree-studded plains surrounded by rock outcrops and cliffs offering impressive views of the surrounding mountain ridges. Elevations range from 2,360 to 4,770 feet (1,450 m) and the area includes the Allegheny Front, the name for the Eastern Continental Divide in this area. The bogs serve to regulate stream flow at the headwaters for both sides of the Front. Recreational trails provide loops within the area as well as connecting to Red Creek Plains, Dolly Sods Wilderness and even further north to Canaan Valley.

An average of 180 inches (15 ft) of snow falls on the area annually, affording opportunities for cross-country skiing and snowshoeing. Snow typically falls from early October into early May. Blizzard conditions can frequent the high ground above 4,000 feet from November into April making travel perilous at times.

About 5.5 square miles (14 square km) lie at or above the 4,500 foot contour, making this the largest and highest flat-topped plateau in eastern North America.

== Ecology ==
The dominant vegetation in the RPW consists of a mesic habitat with red spruce, mixed hardwoods and open brush terrain. Extensive and virtually impenetrable mountain laurel and rhododendron thickets are also present. (The former bloom spectacularly in late June with pink and white blossoms.) The seven known high-elevation wetlands (sphagnum bogs) provide habitat to rare plants and animals such as the snowshoe hare, bog lemming, bobcat and fisher. The area provides protection to the federally threatened Cheat Mountain salamander. Deer, turkey, black bear and other native animals are abundant.

== See also ==
- List of U.S. Wilderness Areas
- Wilderness Act
