= Mount Porte Crayon =

Mountain in West Virginia, United States

- Location within West Virginia

Highest point
- Elevation: 4,770 ft (1,450 m)
- Prominence: 1,590 ft (480 m)
- Parent peak: Allegheny Front
- Coordinates: 38°55′44″N 79°27′22″W

Naming
- Etymology: David Hunter Strother's pseudonym Porte Crayon

Geography
- Parent range: Allegheny Mountains

Climbing
- Access: off-trail hike

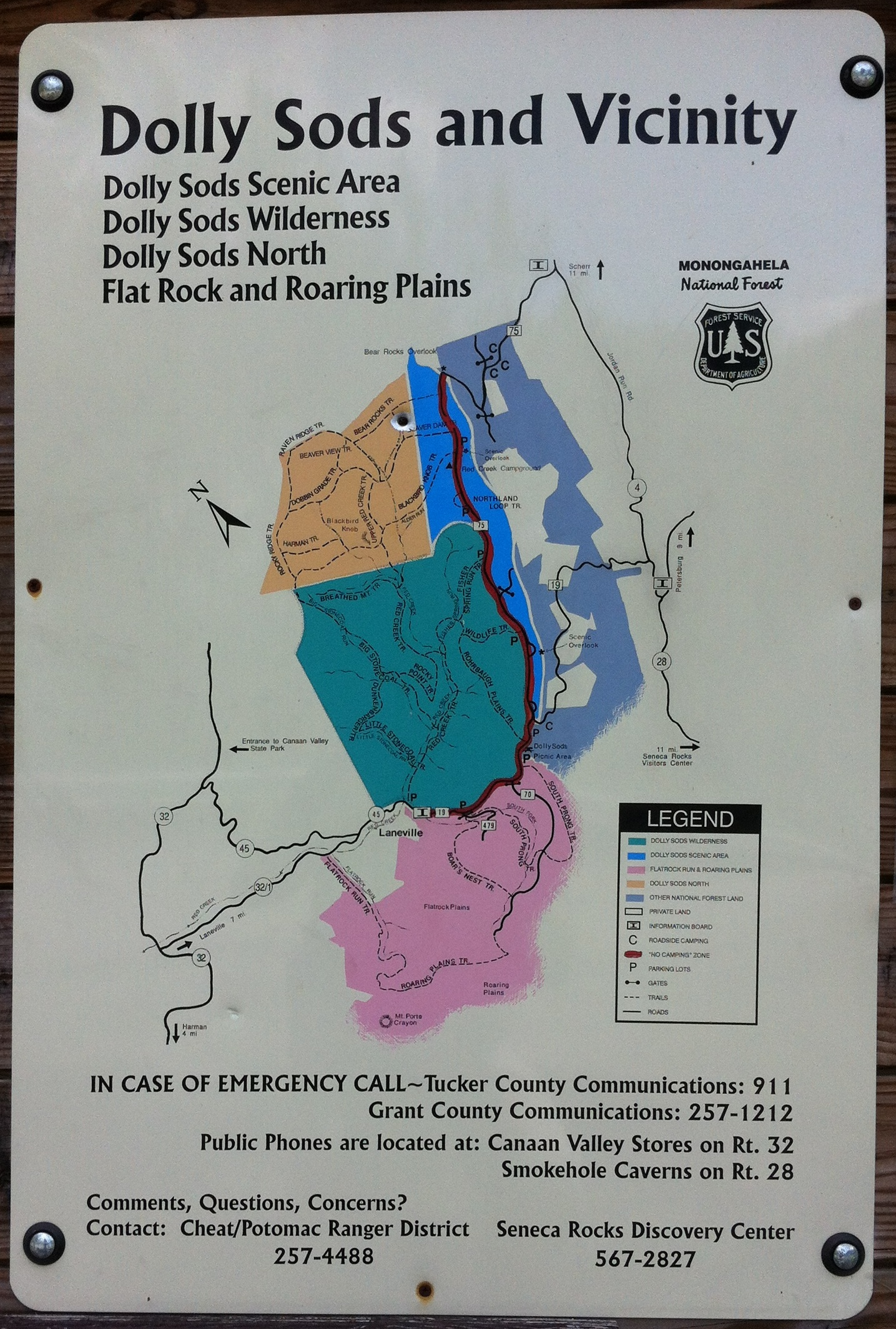
Mt Porte Crayon is indicated at the bottom of this USFS map.

Mount Porte Crayon is a mountain in the Roaring Plains Wilderness of the Monongahela National Forest in the northeastern corner of Randolph County, West Virginia, USA. It rises to an elevation of 4,770 feet (1,450 m), the elevational climax of the Allegheny Front. The mountain is named for 19th century writer and illustrator David Hunter Strother (1816–88), known as "Porte Crayon" (French, porte-crayon: "pencil/crayon holder"), who produced a wide array of early West Virginia landscapes in his work.

== Geography ==
Mount Porte Crayon is the sixth highest point in the state of West Virginia and the northernmost of the top ten state highpoints. It is also the highest point on the Roaring Plains, a natural extension of the Dolly Sods Wilderness.

It is also the highest point on the Eastern Continental Divide in Maryland, Pennsylvania, and West Virginia. The relatively flat plateau on which it sits is the highest, largest plateau in eastern North America with 5.5 square miles lying at or above the 4,500 ft. elevation contour.

The summit area is set aside as an 8.11-acre (32,800 m^{2}) prescribed management area, and is a Research Natural Area, for a native mountaintop red spruce forest that is home to endangered northern flying squirrel and endangered Cheat Mountain salamander. Mount Porte Crayon is the remote headwaters to three drainages and is the highest point on the Eastern Continental Divide in West Virginia, Maryland, and Pennsylvania.

== History ==
=== Naming ===
A group of admirers formed the "Porte Crayon Memorial Society" in 1940. Upon learning of the 4,760-foot (1,451 m) promontory (as it was then measured) in the heart of the writer-illustrator's beloved highland terrain, they successfully lobbied to have it named in his honor. On July 5, 1940, a dedication ceremony was held at the top of the Mountain following a three-hour trek to the site. It included a eulogy, a singing of the national anthem, and the raising of the Star-Spangled Banner atop a spruce flagpole.

=== Nature Conservancy preserve ===
In 2008, the Nature Conservancy established a new preserve on 100 acres (0.4 km^{2}) of red spruce-northern hardwood forest and shrub-filled pastures which are slowly returning to woodland. The Mount Porte Crayon Preserve is wrapped around the southern shoulder of its namesake Mountain and borders Monongahela National Forest's Roaring Plains Wilderness for more than three-fourths of a mile. This is part of an ongoing, long-term program by the Nature Conservancy to protect 1,800 acres (7 km^{2}) at Mount Porte Crayon.

== Climate ==
Mount Porte Crayon is notorious for its inclement weather, rapidly changing conditions, and strong winds. The prevailing westerly winds are so strong, especially in winter, that they deform exposed red spruce trees, causing the trees to be one-sided with branches growing mostly on the east side. Also, the summit is frequently in the clouds. Fog can quickly become so dense as to completely disorient hikers.

Temperatures on the summit are relatively cold, with monthly values averaging below freezing 4 months of the year. During arctic cold air outbreaks in mid-winter afternoon temperatures can stay below 0 °F (−18 °C) and fall to −25 °F (−32 °C) in the mornings. Such cold is usually accompanied by strong winds, making for dangerously low wind chills.

Summer afternoons usually reach the upper 60s °F (20 °C) with mornings in the low to mid 50s °F (11.5 °C). Thunderstorms are frequent and can be violent with dangerous cloud-to-ground lightning.

Precipitation is plentiful, with the annual total estimated to be about 65 inches (1,700 mm) distributed well across all months. Snowfall is also plentiful, averaging about 170 inches (430 cm) a season. Unusually snowy winters can produce 275 inches (700 cm) or more. Snow usually begins falling in early October, ending by early May. Occasional periods of rainfall and temperatures in the 50s °F are common even in the coldest months due to the relatively southerly location of the summit (39 degrees N) allowing for mild above freezing air intrusions from the Gulf of Mexico. These warm rainy periods typically hold down snow accumulations on the ground and result in alternating periods of snow cover and bare ground. Snow pack usually reaches a peak depth of about three feet (0.91 meters) in late February. In persistently cold, snowy winters, snow can accumulate to 4 feet (1.2 m) or more in depth peaking into March, and melting by mid-April.

Climate data for Mount Porte Crayon 38.9274 N, 79.4200 W, Elevation: 4,669 ft (1,423 m) (1991–2020 normals)
Month	Jan	Feb	Mar	Apr	May	Jun	Jul	Aug	Sep	Oct	Nov	Dec	Year
Mean daily maximum °F (°C)	31.1 (−0.5)	33.3 (0.7)	40.6 (4.8)	53.2 (11.8)	61.3 (16.3)	68.6 (20.3)	71.4 (21.9)	70.5 (21.4)	66.2 (19.0)	56.4 (13.6)	44.0 (6.7)	35.3 (1.8)	52.7 (11.5)
Daily mean °F (°C)	23.2 (−4.9)	24.9 (−3.9)	31.7 (−0.2)	43.0 (6.1)	51.9 (11.1)	59.7 (15.4)	62.8 (17.1)	62.0 (16.7)	57.1 (13.9)	46.7 (8.2)	35.6 (2.0)	27.7 (−2.4)	43.9 (6.6)
Mean daily minimum °F (°C)	15.3 (−9.3)	16.6 (−8.6)	22.8 (−5.1)	32.8 (0.4)	42.5 (5.8)	50.9 (10.5)	54.3 (12.4)	53.5 (11.9)	48.0 (8.9)	37.0 (2.8)	27.2 (−2.7)	20.2 (−6.6)	35.1 (1.7)
Average precipitation inches (mm)	5.09 (129)	4.48 (114)	5.09 (129)	5.17 (131)	6.09 (155)	5.57 (141)	5.94 (151)	4.77 (121)	4.58 (116)	3.84 (98)	3.87 (98)	4.88 (124)	59.37 (1,507)
Source: PRISM Climate Group

== Recreation ==
=== Hiking ===
Mount Porte Crayon remains one of West Virginia's most inaccessible peaks, since it is far from the nearest trail, let alone a public road. A walk to the summit using the U.S. Forest Service's Flat Rock Run Trail or Roaring Plains Trail totals more than five miles and is a 2,500-foot (762 m) gain endeavor. This involves a three-mile bushwhack through dense spruce thicket (including half a mile of some very thick spruce and rhododendron). Summiting Mount Porte Crayon is for experienced hikers only and its difficulty should not be underestimated. Views were once afforded from a crag, known as Thunderstruck Rock, about a quarter mile from the summit. Today, the dense regrowth of native Red Spruce has fully reclaimed Thunderstruck Rock and it's overlook.

A visit to the Nature Conservancy's preserve, which is open to the public, involves a three-mile round-trip hike from the junction of the aforementioned trails along the Mount Porte Crayon Grade — a former railroad swath that now accommodates an unmarked and unmaintained trail onto the preserve.

=== Ski resort plans ===
Mount Porte Crayon has been involved in controversy due to plans by Bill Bright, developer of the Winterplace and Glade Springs resorts, who wants to bring a ski resort to the area. The proposed ski area is rumored to be named "Almost Heaven Mountain Resort" and will have the largest vertical drop south of New York.
