= Blandburg, Pennsylvania =

Unincorporated community in Pennsylvania, US

- Census-designated place
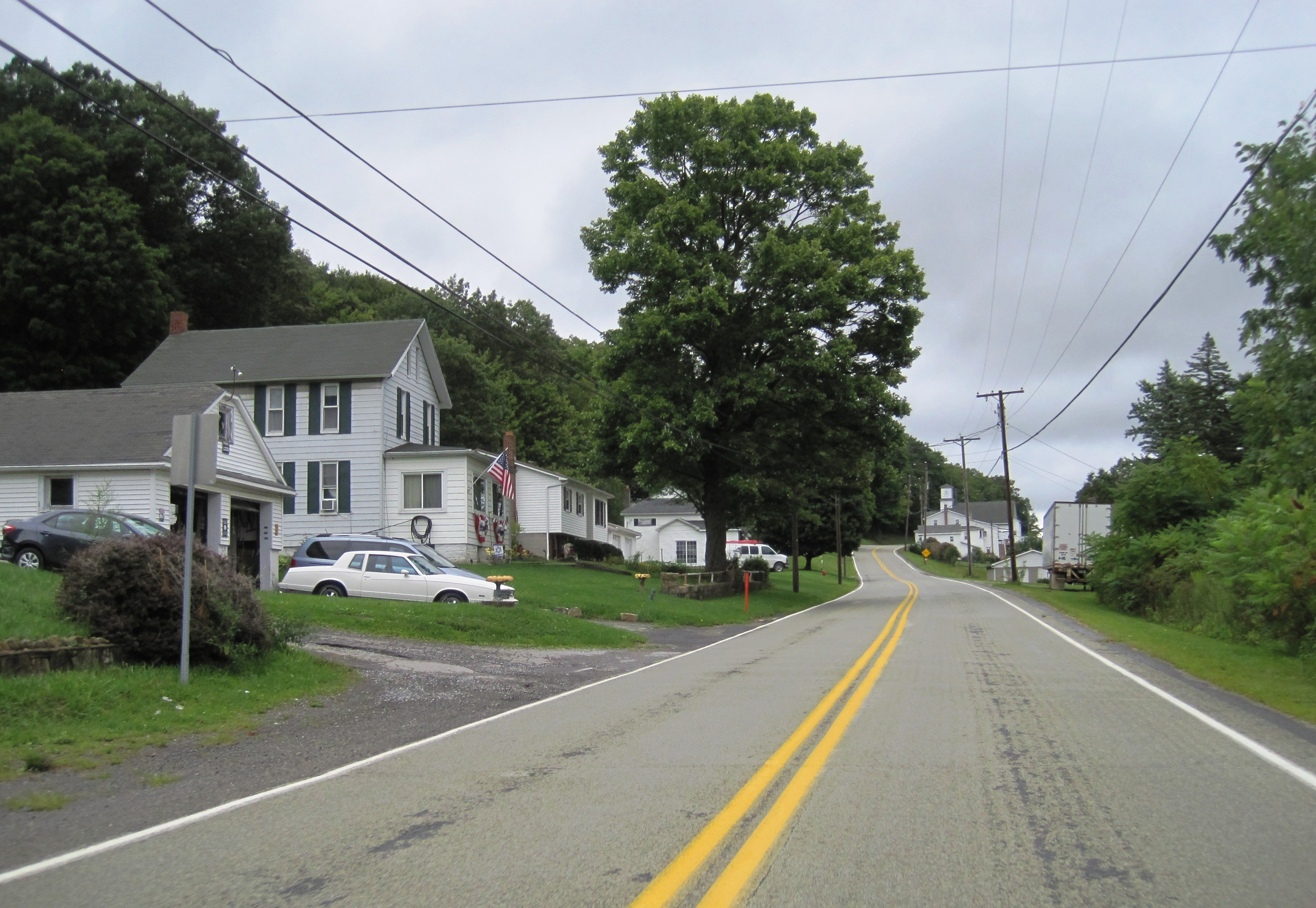
- PA 865 southbound in Blandburg

- Location within the state of Pennsylvania Blandburg (the United States)
- Coordinates: 40°41′1″N 78°24′57″W
- Country: United States
- State: Pennsylvania
- County: Cambria
- Township: Reade

Area
  - Total: 0.48 sq mi (1.25 km^{2})
  - Land: 0.48 sq mi (1.25 km^{2})
  - Water: 0 sq mi (0.00 km^{2})
- Elevation: 2,047 ft (624 m)

Population (2020)
  - Total: 348
  - Density: 718.9/sq mi (277.56/km^{2})
- Time zone: UTC-5 (Eastern (EST))
  - Summer (DST): UTC-4 (EDT)
- ZIP codes: 16619
- FIPS code: 42-06976
- GNIS feature ID: 2634205

Blandburg is an unincorporated community and census-designated place (CDP) in Reade Township, Pennsylvania, United States, located along Pennsylvania Route 865 in far northeastern Cambria County. It was developed as a company town for the Cambria Fire Brick Company, later acquired by the Harbison-Walker Refractories Company.

== Demographics ==
As of the 2010 census, the population was 402 residents.

Historical population
| Census | Pop. | Note | %± |
|---|---|---|---|
| 2020 | 348 | | — |
U.S. Decennial Census

== Education ==
It is in the Glendale School District.
