= Kwassui Women's University =

Higher education institution in Japan

Coordinates: 32.7388°N 129.8734°E

Kwassui Women's University (活水女子大学, Kassui Joshi Daigaku) is a private women's university in Nagasaki, Japan. It enrolls approximately 1,300 students and has exchange agreements with 28 universities in 8 countries.

== Schools and faculties ==
As of 2021, the university had a Graduate School (for English Literature and Language); a Faculty of International Cultural Studies (Departments of English and Japanese Culture); a Faculty of Music (Department of Music); a Faculty of Wellness Studies (Departments of Nutritional Health, Design and Science for Human Life, and Child Development and Education); and a Faculty of Nursing (Department of Nursing).

== Administration ==
Kwassui Women's University is operated by an education foundation, Kwassui Gakuin, which also runs Kwassui Junior High School and Kwassui High School.

== History ==
The university's predecessor, Kwassui Girls' School, was founded by an American Methodist missionary, Elizabeth Russell, in 1879. It was recognized as Kwassui Women's College in 1919.

In 1950, under the new education system, it became Kwassui Women's Junior College. The university was established in 1981 and the graduate school in 1991. The name Kwassui Women's College remained in use until September 2010.

== Notable alumni ==
- Mitsuko Tottori, Chief Executive Officer of Japan Airlines
