= Reade Township, Pennsylvania =

Township in Pennsylvania, US

Coordinates: 40°41′37″N 78°27′37″W

- Township
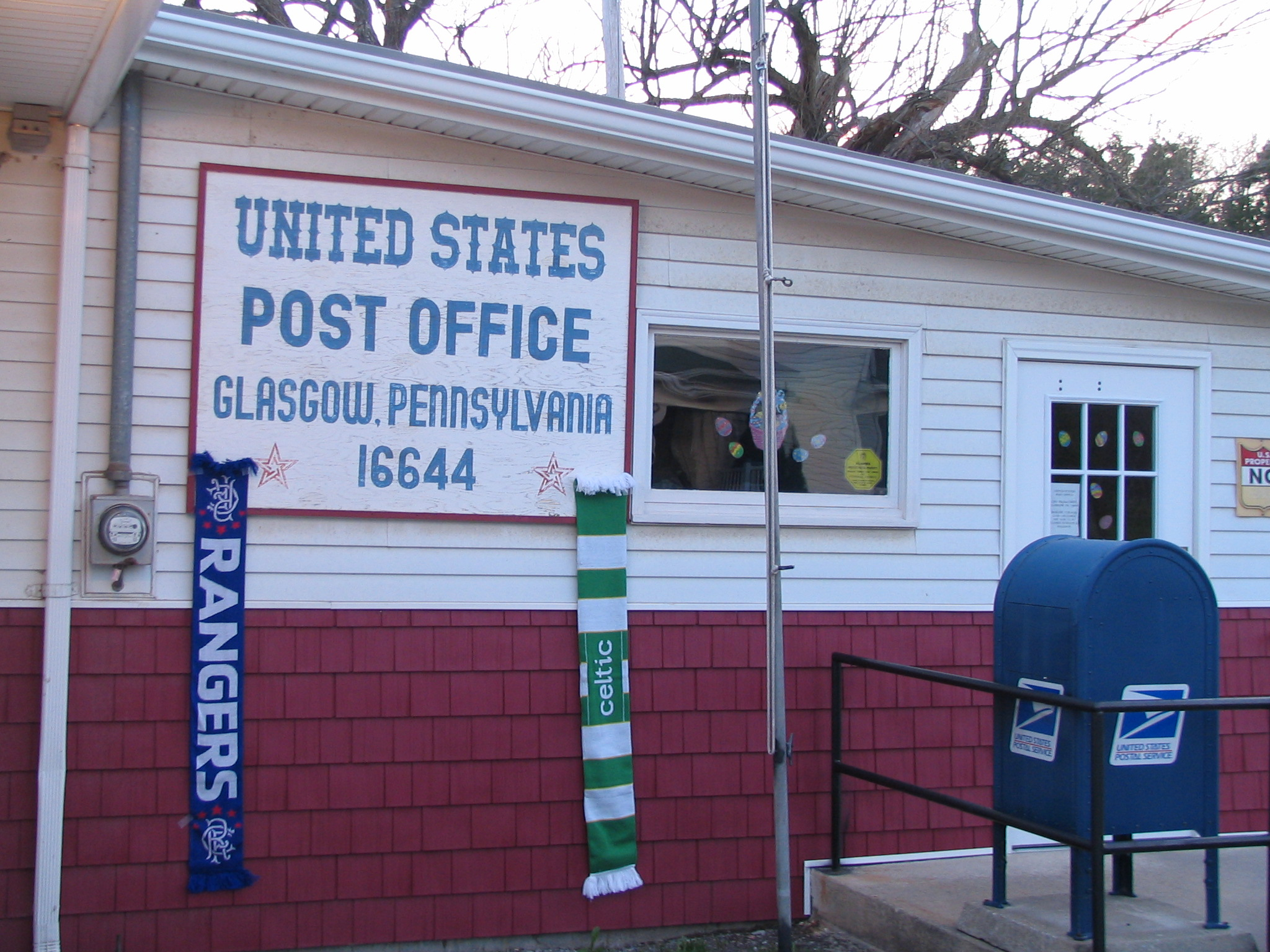
- Post office in the Reade Township village of Glasgow

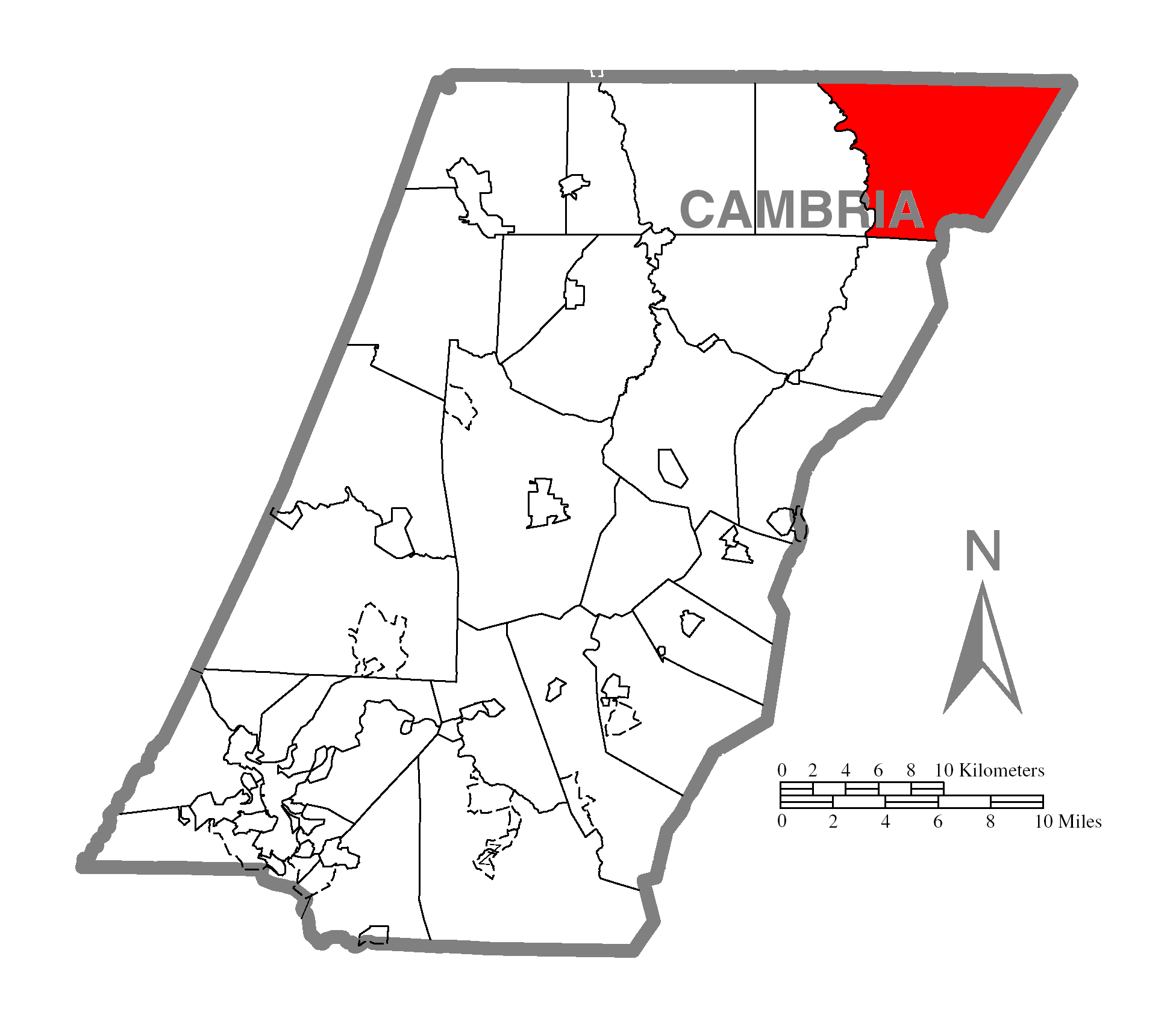
- Map of Cambria County, Pennsylvania highlighting Reade Township

- Map of Cambria County, Pennsylvania
- Country: United States
- State: Pennsylvania
- County: Cambria
- Incorporated: 1879

Area
  - Total: 38.68 sq mi (100.18 km^{2})
  - Land: 38.66 sq mi (100.14 km^{2})
  - Water: 0.015 sq mi (0.04 km^{2})

Population (2010)
  - Total: 1,619
  - Estimate (2016): 1,530
  - Density: 39.6/sq mi (15.28/km^{2})
- Time zone: UTC-5 (Eastern (EST))
  - Summer (DST): UTC-4 (EDT)
- Area code: 814
- FIPS code: 42-021-63608

Reade Township is a township that is located in Cambria County, Pennsylvania, United States. The population was 1,619 at the time of the 2010 census.

== Geography ==
This township is located in the northeastern corner of Cambria County and is bordered by Clearfield County to the north and Blair County to the east. Clearfield Creek, a northward-flowing tributary of the West Branch Susquehanna River, forms the western boundary of the township.

The unincorporated community of Blandburg is located just east of the center of the township. Blandburg is approximately 14 miles (23 km) north of Altoona.

According to the United States Census Bureau, the township has a total area of 38.7 square miles (100.2 km^{2}), of which 0.02 square miles (0.04 km^{2}), or 0.04%, is water.

== Communities ==
=== Census-designated places ===
Census-designated places are geographical areas designated by the U.S. Census Bureau for the purposes of compiling demographic data. They are not actual jurisdictions under Pennsylvania law. Other unincorporated communities, such as villages, may be listed here as well.

- Blandburg

=== Unincorporated communities ===
- Fallentimber
- Flinton
- Frugality
- Glasgow
- Hollentown
- Lloydville
- Mountaindale
- Van Omer

== Demographics ==
Historical population
Census	Pop.	Note	%±
2000	1,764		—
2010	1,619		−8.2%
2016 (est.)	1,530		−5.5%
U.S. Decennial Census

At the 2000 census there were 1,764 people, 623 households, and 457 families in the township. The population density was 45.2 inhabitants per square mile (17.5/km^{2}). There were 726 housing units at an average density of 18.6/sq mi (7.2/km^{2}). The racial makeup of the township was 98.87% White, 0.23% African American, 0.11% Native American, 0.11% Pacific Islander, and 0.68% from two or more races. Hispanic or Latino of any race were 0.17%.

There were 623 households, 31.6% had children under the age of 18 living with them, 57.3% were married couples living together, 11.2% had a female householder with no husband present, and 26.5% were non-families. 22.8% of households were made up of individuals, and 12.4% were one person aged 65 or older. The average household size was 2.61 and the average family size was 3.05.

The age distribution was 24.6% under the age of 18, 7.3% from 18 to 24, 27.2% from 25 to 44, 22.1% from 45 to 64, and 18.9% 65 or older. The median age was 39 years. For every 100 females, there were 100.2 males. For every 100 females age 18 and over, there were 97.9 males.

The median household income was $25,903 and the median family income was $29,464. Males had a median income of $25,647 versus $17,292 for females. The per capita income for the township was $10,989. About 13.2% of families and 18.0% of the population were below the poverty line, including 20.2% of those under age 18 and 14.2% of those age 65 or over.

== Recreation ==
Prince Gallitzin State Park occupies a large portion of the western end of the township, and Pennsylvania State Game Lands Number 108 and Pennsylvania State Game Lands Number 158 occupy a large portion of the eastern end of the township.
