= Allegheny Front =

Major escarpment in the Allegheny Mountains

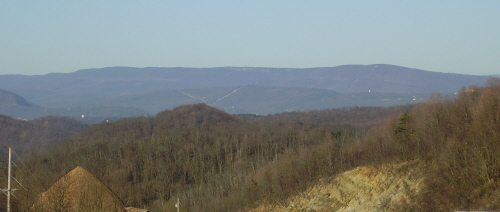
- Dans Mountain, part of the Allegheny Front in Maryland

Highest point
- Peak: Mount Porte Crayon, Randolph/Pendleton Co. border, West Virginia
- Elevation: 4,774 ft (1,455 m)
- Coordinates: 38°55′44″N 79°27′22″W

Geography
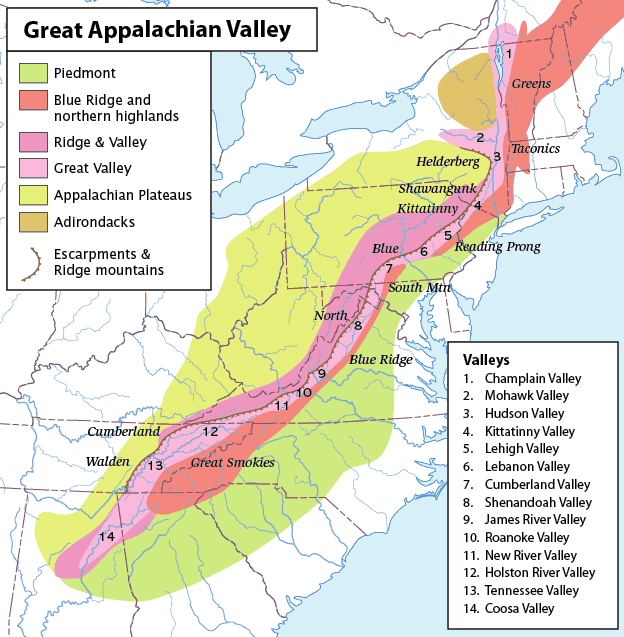
- The Allegheny Front (not specifically marked on the map) forms the western boundary of the indicated "Ridge & Valley" region of the Appalachians.
- Country: United States
- States: Pennsylvania; Maryland; West Virginia; Virginia
- Range coordinates: 39°04′23″N 79°17′53″W
- Parent range: Allegheny Mountains of the Ridge-and-Valley Appalachians

Geology
- Orogeny: Alleghenian orogeny

The Allegheny Front is the major southeast- or east-facing escarpment in the Allegheny Mountains in southern Pennsylvania, western Maryland, eastern West Virginia, and western Virginia. The Allegheny Front forms the boundary between the Ridge-and-Valley Appalachians to its east and the Appalachian Plateau (locally called the Allegheny Plateau) to its west. The Front is closely associated with the Appalachian Mountains' Eastern Continental Divide, which in this area divides the waters of the Ohio/Mississippi river system, flowing to the Gulf of Mexico, from rivers flowing into the Chesapeake Bay and from there into the Atlantic Ocean.

The Allegheny Front and the Eastern Continental Divide do not always coincide; for example, the North Branch of the Potomac River begins well west of the Front, at the Fairfax Stone near the southwestern tip of Maryland, about 10 miles (16 km) and across the actual divide from the headwaters of the Youghiogheny River draining northwards into the Monongahela and Ohio rivers. The Front and the Divide diverge completely in central Pennsylvania where the West Branch Susquehanna River originates north of the Allegheny Front.

The Allegheny Front is one of the windiest spots east of the Mississippi, leading to the recent establishment of wind farming there.

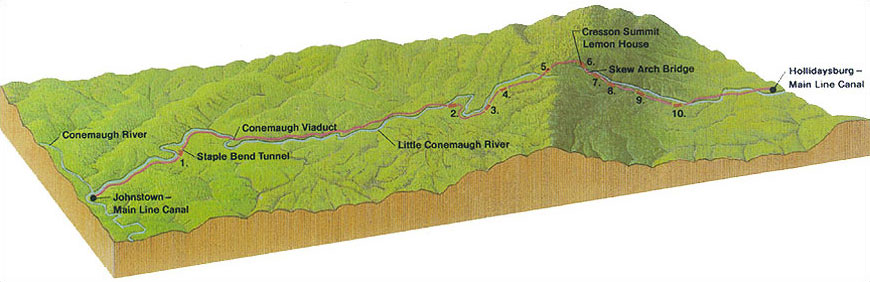
This profile of the Allegheny Portage Railroad crossing the Allegheny Front gives perspective on how the front formed the final barrier range preventing easy settlement of the colonial and post-Revolutionary-War West (today's Midwest). Note the upland nature of the western side of the front, the Allegheny Plateau.

== Geography ==
The Allegheny Front forms part of the Appalachian Structural Front, separating the Appalachian Plateau from the Appalachians' Ridge and Valley Province. The various other escarpments along this structural feature include the Catskill Escarpment to the northeast and the Cumberland Escarpment to the southwest. The Allegheny Front extends for about 180 miles (290 km) southwesterly from south-central Pennsylvania through western Maryland, then divides the eastern panhandle of West Virginia from the rest of that state.

The name "Allegheny Front" is applied to the escarpment throughout much of its extent, although it is little used in Maryland.

=== Elevations ===
The highest part of the crest of the Allegheny Front is also its southernmost high point, Mount Porte Crayon at 4,770 feet (1,450 m), on the Pendleton/Randolph county line in West Virginia. Its lowest point, 790 feet (240 m), is along the North Branch of the Potomac River near Keyser, West Virginia. Other high points along the front include the Dolly Sods Wilderness in West Virginia, a broad, rocky plateau at an elevation of about 4,000 feet (1,200 m); Dan's Rock on Dans Mountain in Maryland at 2,895 feet (882 m); and Blue Knob in northern Bedford County, Pennsylvania, with an elevation greater than 3,120 feet (950 m).

=== Eastern Continental Divide ===
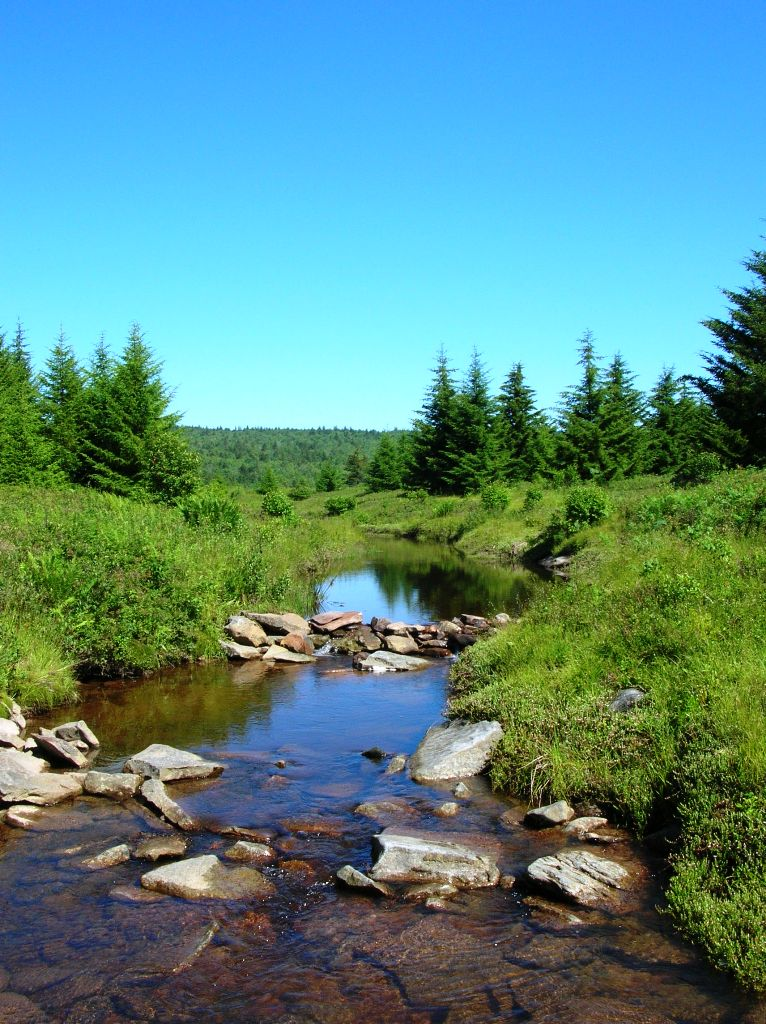
Red Creek west of the crest of the Allegheny Front in the Dolly Sods area of West Virginia; the creek originates along the Eastern Continental Divide, with its waters flowing to the Gulf of Mexico as part of the Ohio River watershed.

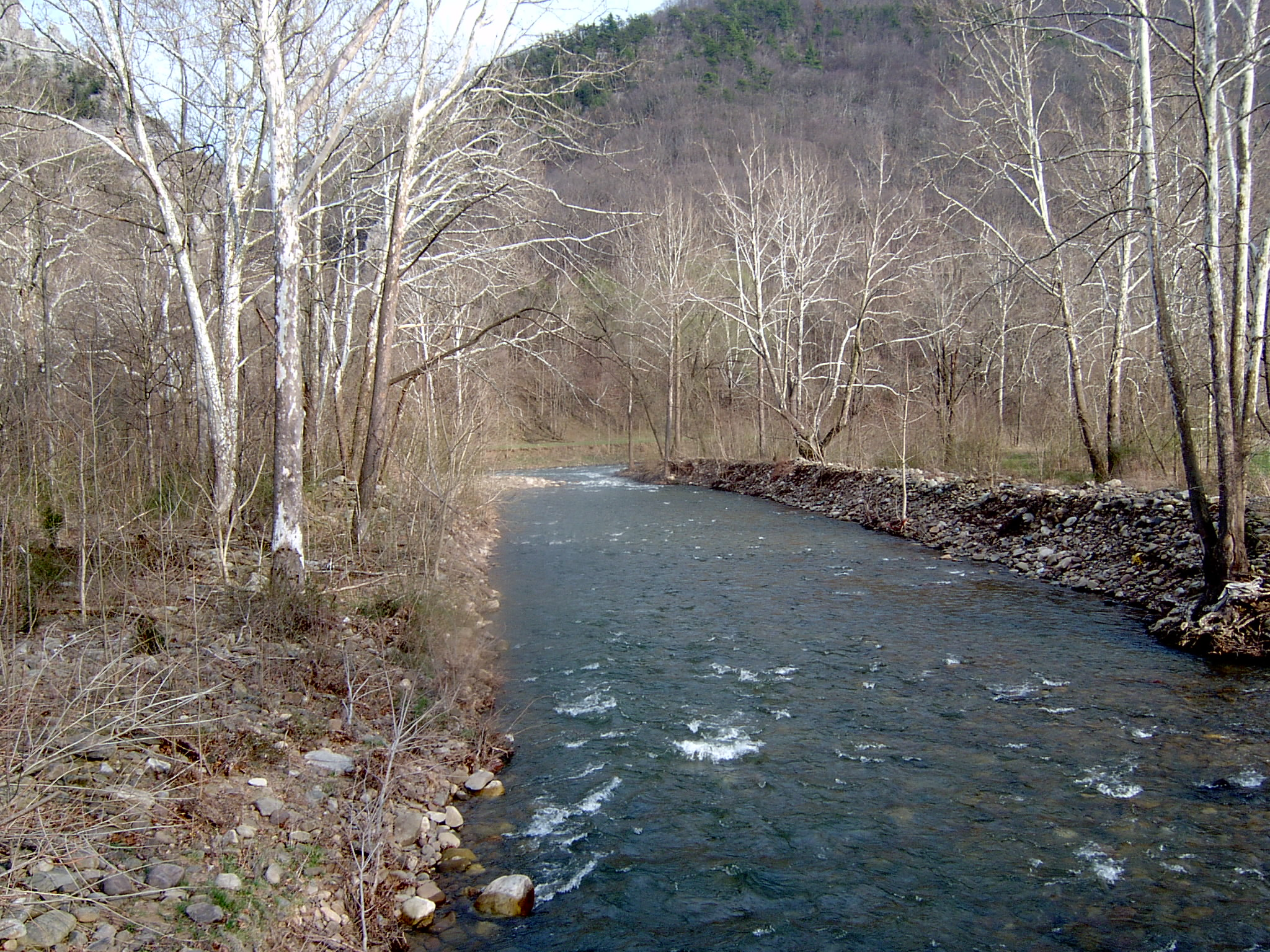
Seneca Creek, incised into the Allegheny Front west of Seneca Rocks, West Virginia. This short but steep creek originates along the Eastern Continental Divide; its waters flow into the Atlantic Ocean via the Potomac River and the Chesapeake Bay.

Local segments of the Eastern Continental Divide usually pass within a few miles of the Allegheny Front and in many places coincide with it; this divide between waters of the Atlantic Ocean and the Gulf of Mexico separates the westward-flowing Ohio River watershed from the eastward-flowing watersheds of the Susquehanna, Potomac, and James rivers. Numerous eastward-flowing streams have their headwaters incised into Allegheny Front, displacing the divide westward from the front, including the North Branch of the Potomac River west of Cumberland, Maryland, which originates well into the Appalachian Plateau at the Fairfax Stone, just south of Maryland's southwestern tip. No waterway crosses the front from east to west.

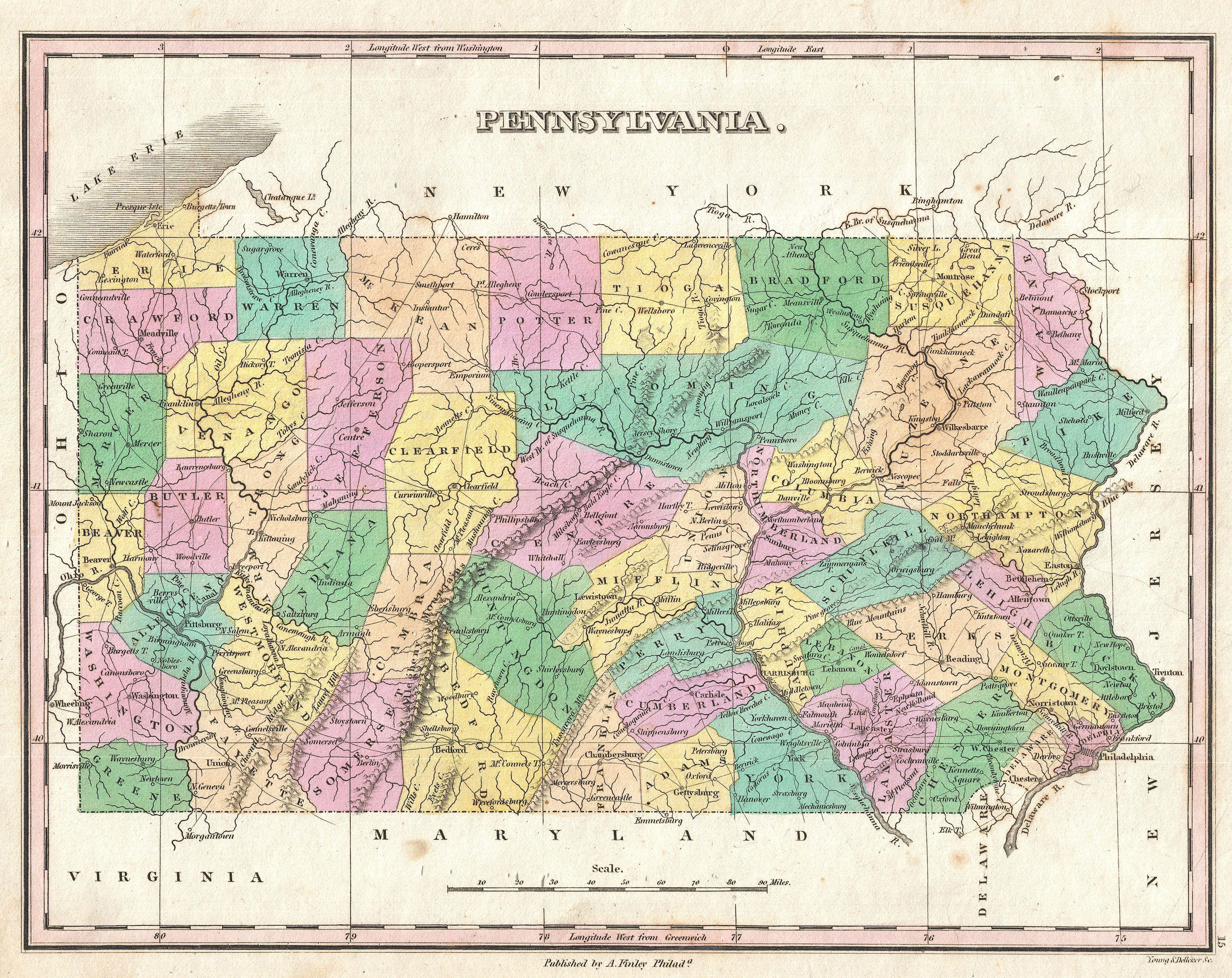
1827 Finley Map of Pennsylvania (Note: Engraved by Young and Delleker for the 1827 edition of Anthony Finley's General Atlas)

=== Course ===
The Allegheny Front begins in central Pennsylvania northwest of Lock Haven and extends southwest paralleling Bald Eagle Mountain and Brush Mountain to its east. The front continues to a point north of the Pennsylvania/Maryland boundary where it is offset about 10 miles (16 km) to the east as it changes from the bold escarpment that characterized it west of Altoona to its more gentle rise in Maryland.

Across the Mason–Dixon line in Maryland, the front becomes Dans Mountain, west of Cumberland, which reaches 2,895 feet (882 m) at Dan's Rock. Along Maryland's southern border, the North Branch of the Potomac River cuts down through the front at 790 feet (240 m) just west of Keyser, West Virginia.

South of the Potomac in West Virginia, the front continues through the Mount Storm area, then passes along the eastern edge of Dolly Sods, a wide plateau of Pottsville conglomerate bedrock at about 4,000 feet (1,200 m) elevation. From the Sods, the front continues southward as an increasingly steep escarpment west of the North Fork of the South Branch Potomac River, with the Roaring Plains West Wilderness continuing the high plateaus of the Dolly Sods area along the escarpment's crest. The Allegheny Front's southern end is Mount Porte Crayon (4,770 ft or 1,450 m), after which the land drops steeply to Seneca Creek, west of Seneca Rocks.

=== Escarpments ===
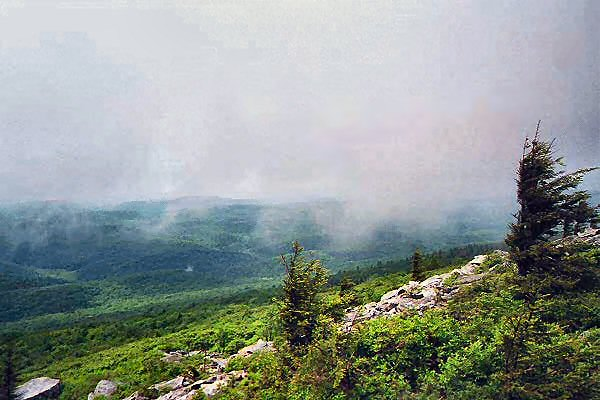
Pottsville-capped Spruce Knob in West Virginia

South of Mount Porte Crayon and Seneca Creek, the Appalachian structural front is less clearly unified. Pottsville-capped Spruce Mountain, south and east of Seneca Creek, continues the Allegheny Front's geology southward; this ridge reaches an elevation of 4,863 feet (1,482 m) at Spruce Knob, West Virginia's highest point. Similarly steep escarpments sharing much of the same geologic structure are also present nearby along the eastern slopes of Allegheny Mountain and Back Allegheny Mountain (along with the southern end of Shavers Mountain), but these mountains lack the Pottsville caps characteristic of the Allegheny Front. Allegheny Mountain's long, nearly level crest is generally about 4,000 to 4,200 feet (1,200 to 1,300 m) in elevation, with Paddy Knob reaching 4,477 feet (1,365 m). High points on Back Allegheny Mountain and adjacent Shavers Mountain include Gaudineer Knob (4,432 ft or 1,351 m) and Bald Knob (4,842 ft or 1,476 m); these two mountains form a part of the divide between the Monongahela River and New River portions of the Ohio River watershed.

== Geology ==
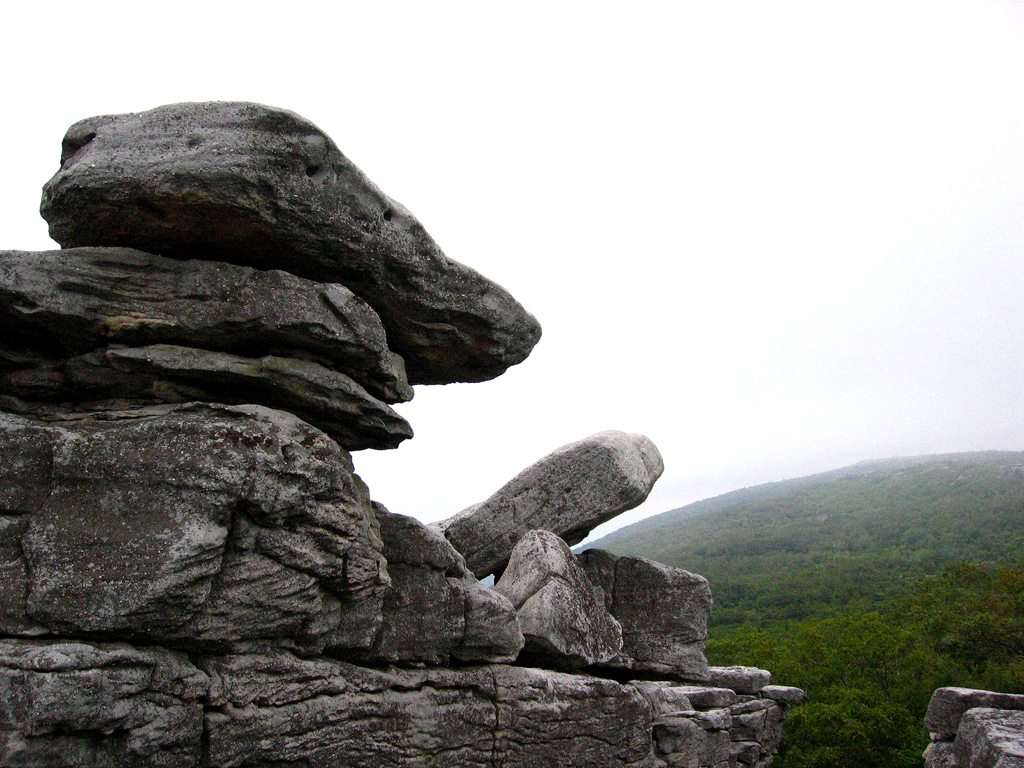
Pottsville conglomerate atop the Allegheny Front showing ventifact (wind) etching, Bear Rocks, Dolly Sods, West Virginia

Most of the Allegheny Front is capped by a nearly horizontal, erosion-resistant stratum (rock layer) of white Pottsville conglomerate, sometimes where flat with younger Carboniferous strata on top. The silica-cemented, gravel-containing Pottsville rock formed as part of a vast delta in the Pennsylvanian period.

The region was then uplifted and folded during the Alleghenian orogeny about 320-250 million years ago, during the Carboniferous (Note: The orogeny's beginnings were within the Pennsylvanian subperiod of the Carboniferous, often considered a distinct geological period, the Pennsylvanian.) and Permian periods, forming the modern Appalachian Mountains as the North American and African tectonic plates collided.

Subsequent erosion (for more than 200 million years) has preferentially removed various softer surrounding rocks, especially the easily dissolved Greenbrier limestone, leaving areas of the hard Pottsville conglomerate as a caprock protecting softer rock strata immediately beneath. The Pottsville outcrops conspicuously in various more exposed areas along the front's eastern edge. Many of these clifftops offer broad scenic views, unlike most mountaintops within the generally forested Appalachians, and the more readily accessible are popular tourist destinations, including Dan's Rock on Dans Mountain in Maryland and the Dolly Sods and an overlook along U.S. Route 50 in West Virginia.

Since the eastern side of the front is drained by the Chesapeake Bay streams that drop fairly rapidly through the Ridge and Valley Province to the low-elevation waters of the Great Appalachian Valley, erosion on the eastern slope of this caprock layer has been much more intense than on the western slope, where drainage to low elevations is spread over a greater distance (particularly considering stream meanders) through the Appalachian Plateau to the Ohio River. These contrasting patterns of erosion produce a steep escarpment along much of the front's eastern edge, with the mountains west of the front generally grading more gently into the Appalachian Plateau.

== Ecology ==
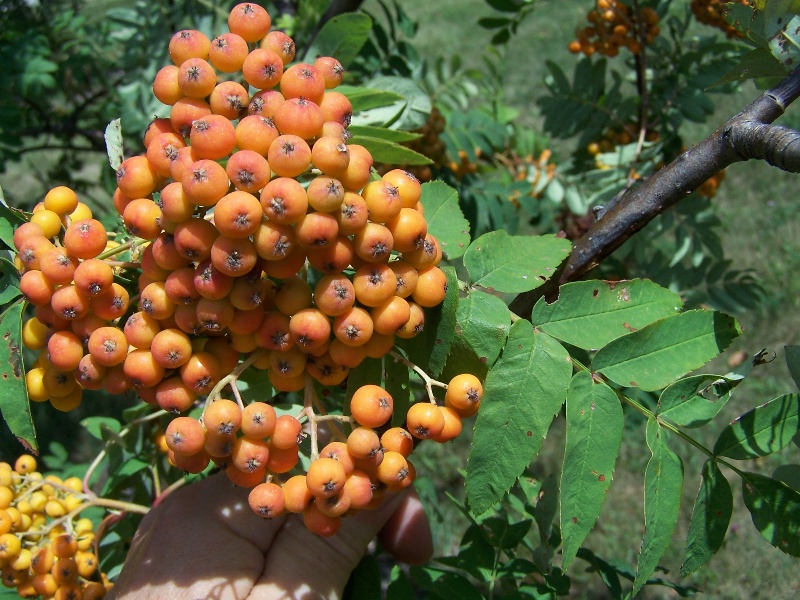
American mountain-ash (Sorbus americana), characteristic of high-elevation cliff-edge vegetation along the Allegheny Front

The nearly continuous high elevation and clifftop bedrock exposures of the Allegheny Front provide an important corridor of upland habitat in the central Appalachian Mountains.

=== Migratory bird flyway ===
During the fall, the Allegheny Front is associated with an important flyway for migratory birds traveling from their northern breeding grounds to their southern wintering sites. In good weather, the birds can be seen from late morning, when they take advantage of the thermals (rising pockets of warm air) to facilitate flying, until the thermals cease in late afternoon.

Among the bird-banding stations and migratory bird observatories associated with this flyway are:

- Allegheny Front Hawk Watch on the border between Bedford and Somerset counties, Pennsylvania. On 20 September 2003, after the remnants of Hurricane Isabel passed western Pennsylvania, 833 hawks were counted passing the site. The Allegheny Front Hawk Watch set three Eastern Flyway Golden Eagle records during the 2015 migration. The first was counting 74 golden eagles on October 24, 2015. This helped propel the hawk site to a new fall record of 320 golden eagles being counted during the fall migration. This coupled with the 66 goldens counted in the spring of 2015, yielded a total of 386 migrating birds for the year.
- Allegheny Front Migratory Observatory (Bird Banding Station) near the Red Creek Campground at Dolly Sods. The station is open from August to October in good weather. Established in 1958, it is the only cooperative banding station in West Virginia.

=== Dolly Sods Wilderness ===
In the Dolly Sods Wilderness of West Virginia, and southward toward Mount Porte Crayon, the front is topped for more than 10 miles (16 km) by a broad, nearly flat plateau with many wide areas of exposed bedrock along the edge of the escarpment's 2,800-to-3,200-foot (850 to 980 m) drop (Note: The elevation of the North Fork River at Laneville, directly east of the Sods, is 1,148 feet (350 m), for a drop from the 4,000-foot (1,200 m) summit plateau of about 2,800 feet (850 m). The Seneca Creek watershed drops about 3,200 feet (980 m) from Mount Porte Crayon's 4,770-foot (1,450 m) summit to about 1,560 feet (480 m) at the Potomac River at the town of Seneca Rocks (formerly called Mouth of Seneca), near the Seneca Rocks geological formation west of North Fork Mountain.) to the North Fork River to the east, along the front's base. Many of these windswept cliff-edge outcrops are sparsely vegetated, with occasional one-sided (flagged) red spruce (Picea rubens) trees, and open habitats dominated by various low-growing Appalachian and boreal plant species.

== Economic importance ==
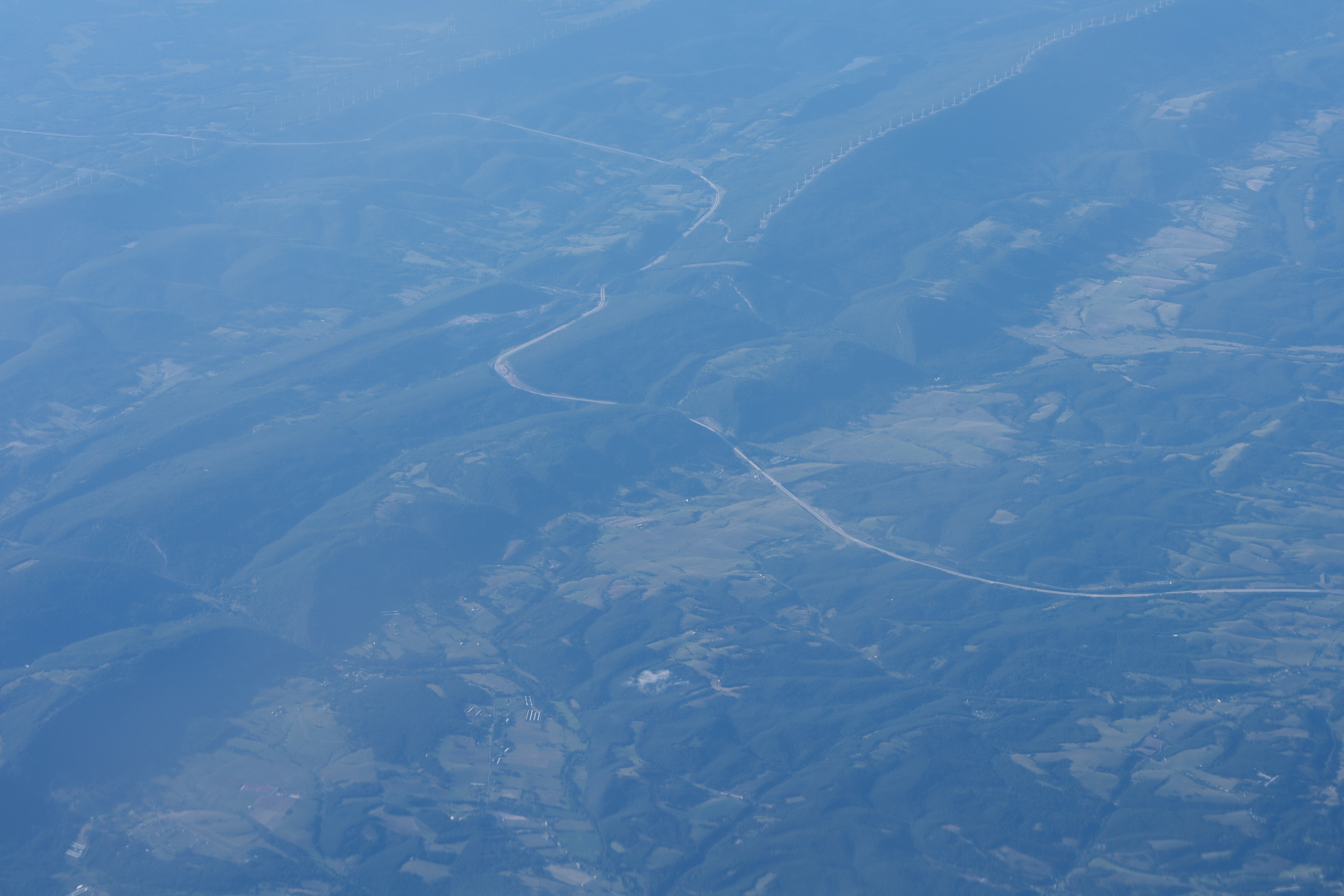
U.S. Route 48 crossing the Allegheny Front

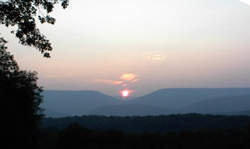
View of Saddle Mountain at sunrise from Skyline atop the Allegheny Front along U.S. 50 in West Virginia

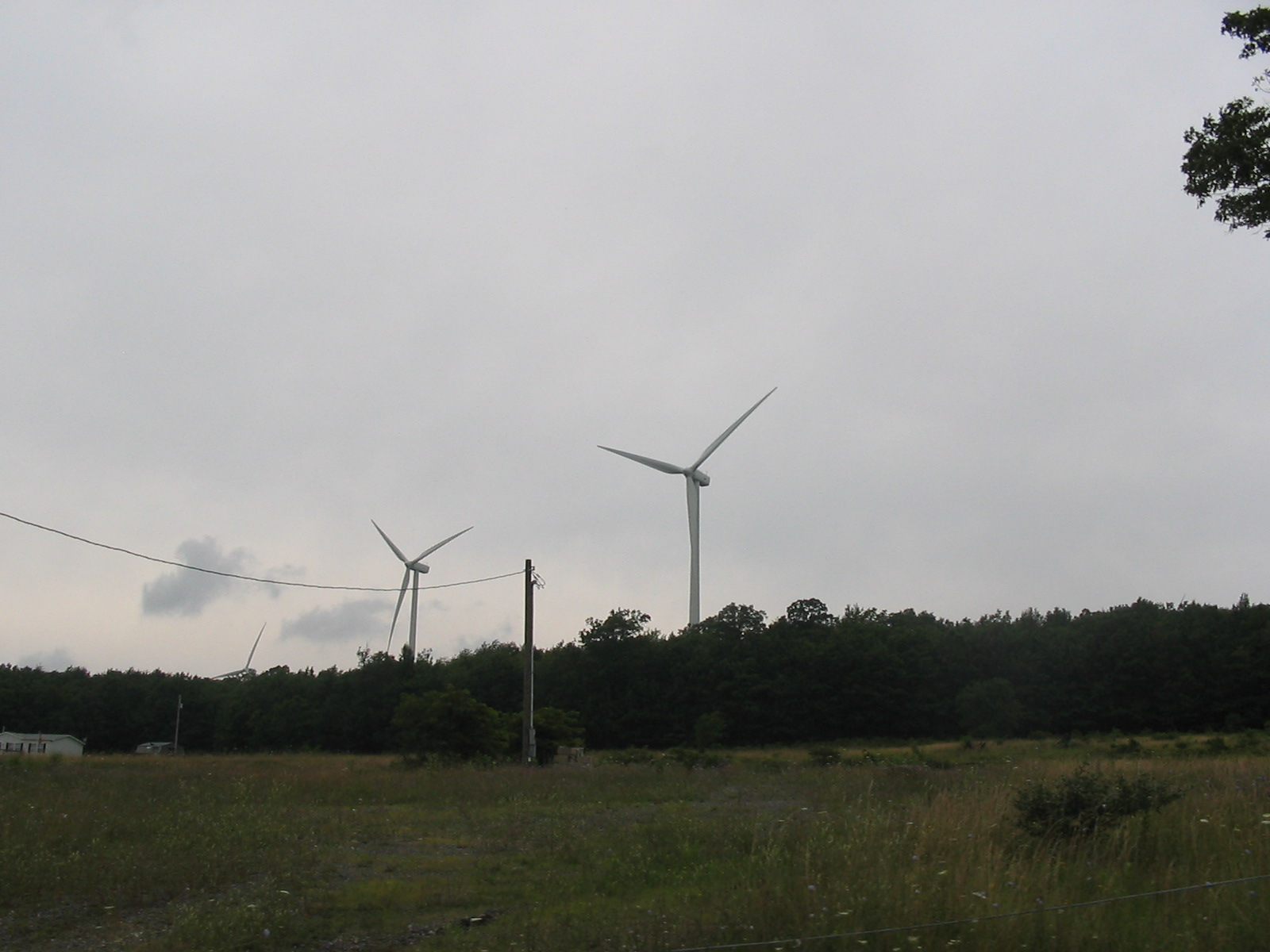
NedPower Mount Storm Wind Project, West Virginia

The long, steep, nearly continuous, often windswept escarpment of the Allegheny Front has both positive and negative effects on society and culture in the central Appalachians region.

=== Challenge to transportation and communication ===
Few roads or railroads cross the Allegheny Front, limiting transportation and communication between the regions to its east and west. Establishing passage of the front was key to the development of the U.S. railroad network during the second half of the 19th century, thereby connecting the Midwest by rail with the Atlantic seaboard. The Pennsylvania Railroad built the Horseshoe Curve track section west of Altoona, so that freight trains could ascend or descend to or from the Allegheny Plateau to the west.

=== Recreation and tourism ===
Substantial portions of the Allegheny Front's crest and slopes are parts of a national forest (the Monongahela in West Virginia) or various state, local, or private wildlands parks or preserves. The few readily accessible scenic viewpoints atop the Allegheny Front are popular tourist destinations. The Skyline Overlook along U.S. Route 50 in West Virginia is readily accessible by a major road. The front is also a significant part of scenic views from various highways and mountains to its east, such as North Fork Mountain in West Virginia.

=== Wind farming ===
The NedPower Mount Storm Wind Project in West Virginia includes 132 wind turbines along 12 miles (19 km) of the Allegheny Front in Grant County near Mount Storm. Constructed between 2006 and 2008, it generates up to 264 megawatts of electricity for the mid-Atlantic power grid, enough to service about 66,000 homes and businesses.

In December 2016, Save Our Allegheny Ridges, a group that opposes energy development on forested mountaintops, said in a news release that Invenergy plans to install a series of wind turbines atop Shaffer Mountain in Somerset County just a few miles north of the Allegheny Front Hawk Watch.
