= Antis Township, Blair County, Pennsylvania =

Township in Pennsylvania, US

Antis Township, Pennsylvania
- Township
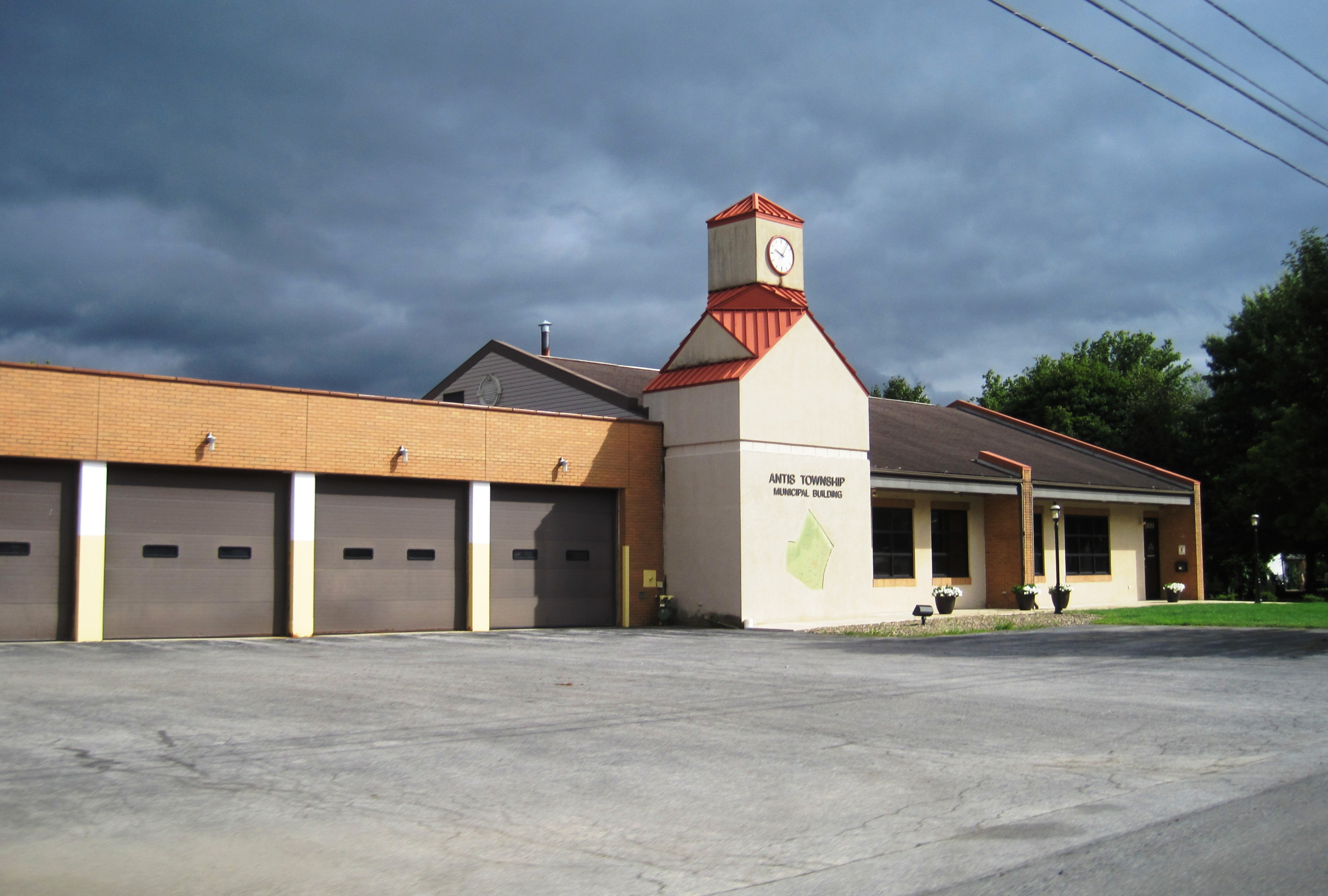
- Antis Township Municipal Building

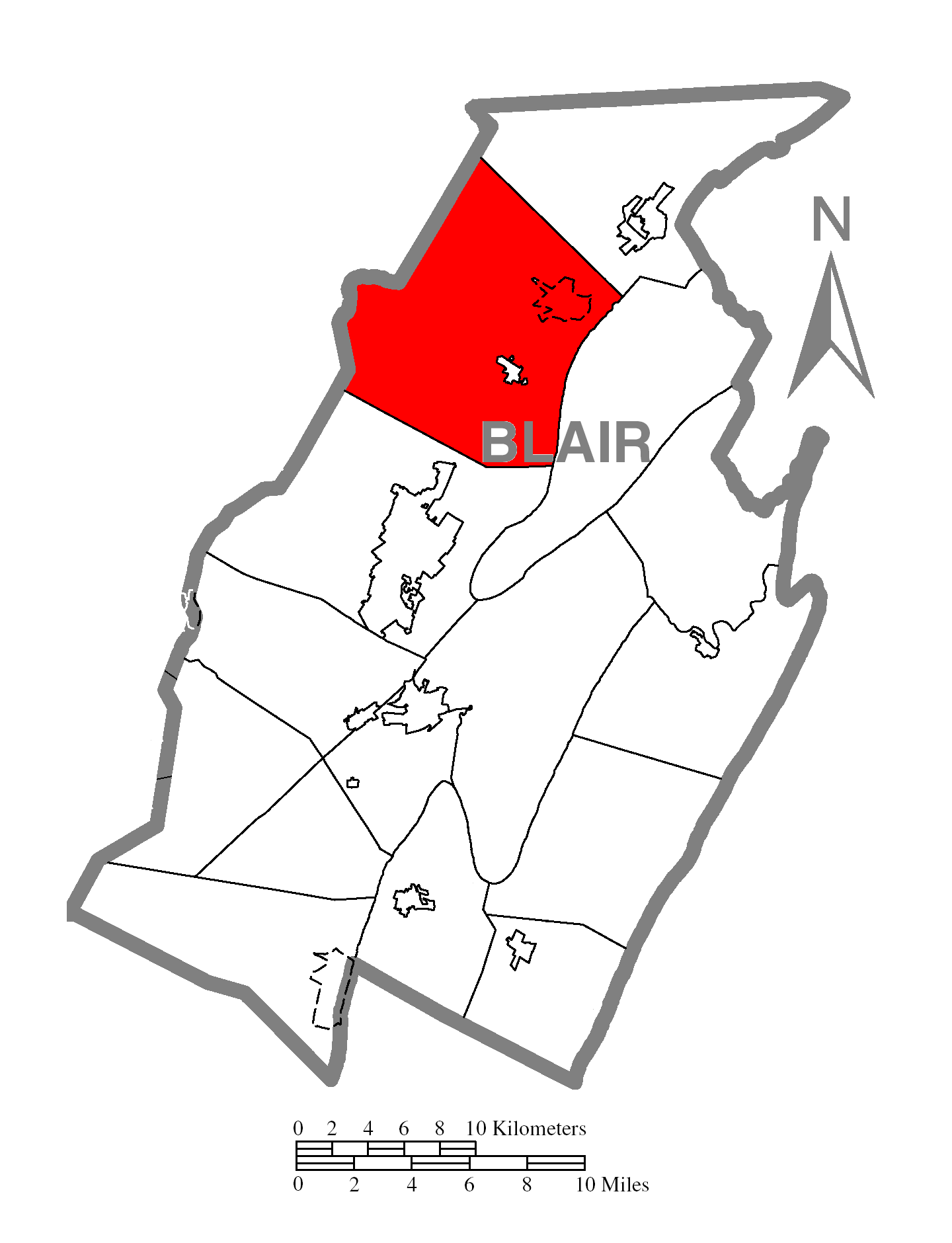
- Map of Blair County, Pennsylvania highlighting Antis Township

- Map of Blair County, Pennsylvania
- Coordinates: 40°38′00″N 78°22′59″W
- Country: United States
- State: Pennsylvania
- County: Blair
- Settled: 1787
- Incorporated: 1810

Government
  - Type: Board of Supervisors
  - Chairman: Raymond E. Amato
  - Vice Chairman: Robert E. Smith, Jr.
  - Supervisor: Kenneth W. Hostler
  - Supervisor: Charles W. Taylor
  - Supervisor: C.J. Caracciolo

Area
  - Total: 61.07 sq mi (158.17 km^{2})
  - Land: 60.83 sq mi (157.54 km^{2})
  - Water: 0.24 sq mi (0.62 km^{2})

Population (2020)
  - Total: 6,484
  - Estimate (2022): 6,383
  - Density: 104.7/sq mi (40.41/km^{2})
- Time zone: UTC-5 (Eastern (EST))
  - Summer (DST): UTC-4 (EDT)
- Area code: 814
- FIPS code: 42-013-02680
- Website: Township website

Antis Township is a township in Blair County, Pennsylvania, United States. The population was 6,484 at the 2020 census.

== History ==
The township was named for Frederick Antes, a colonel who fought during the Revolutionary War.

== Geography ==
Antis Township is located in northwestern Blair County, with its northwestern border following the Cambria County line. The township fully surrounds the borough of Bellwood. Census-designated places in the township include (from north to south) Tipton, Fostoria, Roots, Reightown, and Pinecroft. Charlottsville is on the township's northeastern border, and Greenwood is on the southern border. Interstate 99 traverses the eastern side of the township, with three exits within its borders.

According to the United States Census Bureau, the township has a total area of 61.1 square miles (158.2 km^{2}), of which 60.8 square miles (157.5 km^{2}) is land and 0.23 square miles (0.6 km^{2}), or 0.39%, is water.

== Demographics ==
Historical population
| Census | Pop. | Note | %± |
|---|---|---|---|
| 2010 | 6,499 | | — |
| 2020 | 6,484 | | −0.2% |
| 2022 (est.) | 6,383 | | −1.6% |

As of the census of 2000, there were 6,328 people, 2,530 households, and 1,884 families residing in the township. The population density was 104.1 inhabitants per square mile (40.2/km^{2}). There were 2,661 housing units at an average density of 43.8 per square mile (16.9/km^{2}). The racial makeup of the township was 99.00% White, 0.09% African American, 0.17% Native American, 0.17% Asian, 0.02% Pacific Islander, 0.08% from other races, and 0.46% from two or more races. Hispanic or Latino of any race were 0.28% of the population.

There were 2,530 households, out of which 30.6% had children under the age of 18 living with them, 63.2% were married couples living together, 7.7% had a female householder with no husband present, and 25.5% were non-families. 22.1% of all households were made up of individuals, and 11.5% had someone living alone who was 65 years of age or older. The average household size was 2.50 and the average family size was 2.92.

In the township the population was spread out, with 22.3% under the age of 18, 7.4% from 18 to 24, 27.9% from 25 to 44, 26.8% from 45 to 64, and 15.5% who were 65 years of age or older. The median age was 40 years. For every 100 females, there were 98.2 males. For every 100 females age 18 and over, there were 96.3 males.

The median income for a household in the township was $39,682, and the median income for a family was $46,301. Males had a median income of $34,770 versus $21,948 for females. The per capita income for the township was $17,950. About 4.4% of families and 6.8% of the population were below the poverty line, including 8.6% of those under age 18 and 9.2% of those age 65 or over.

== Recreation ==
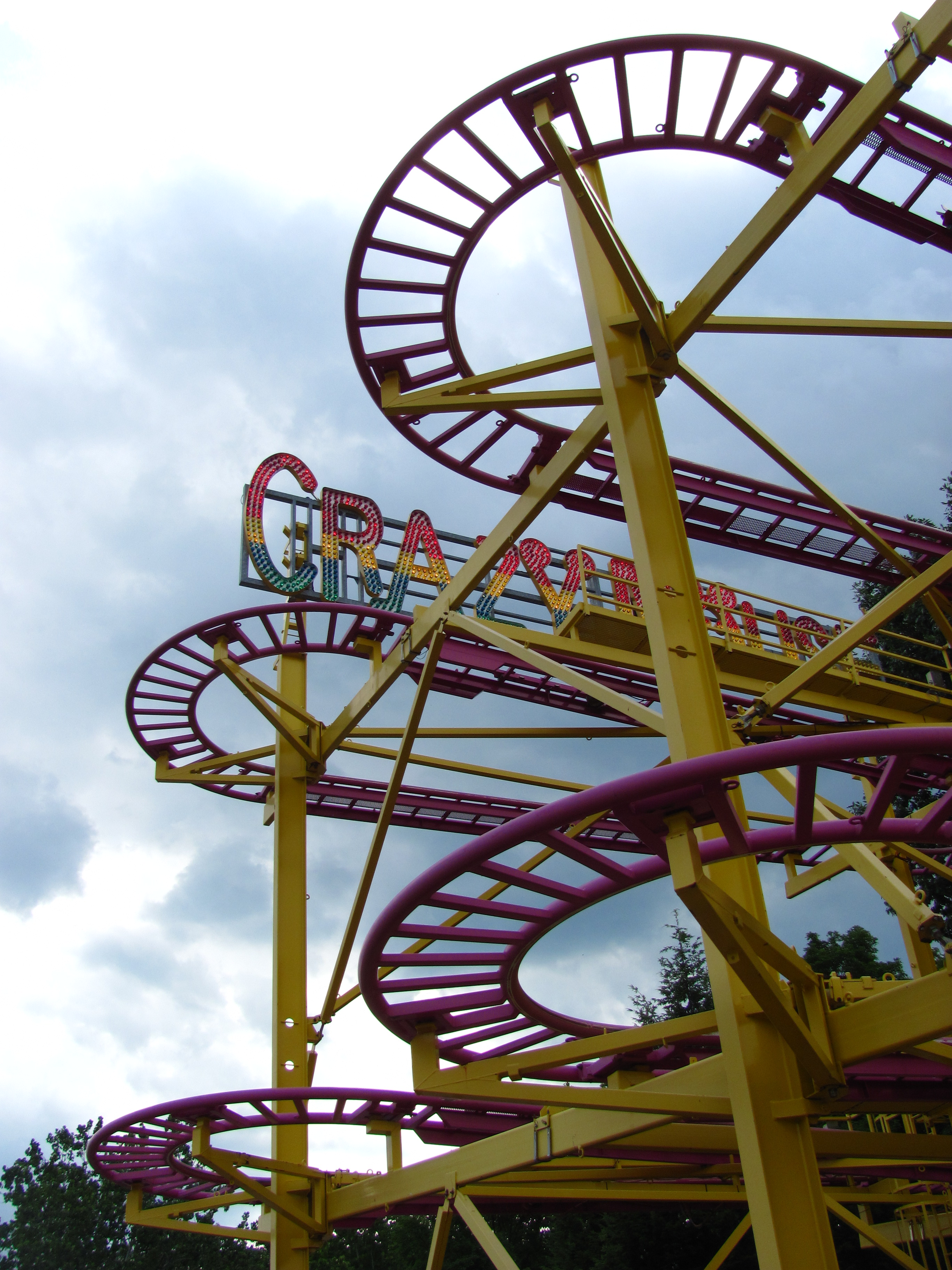
Crazy Mouse ride at DelGrosso's Amusement Park in Tipton

Portions of the Pennsylvania State Game Lands Number 108 and Pennsylvania State Game Lands Number 158 occupy much of the township.
