= Bellwood, Pennsylvania =

Borough in Pennsylvania, US

- Borough
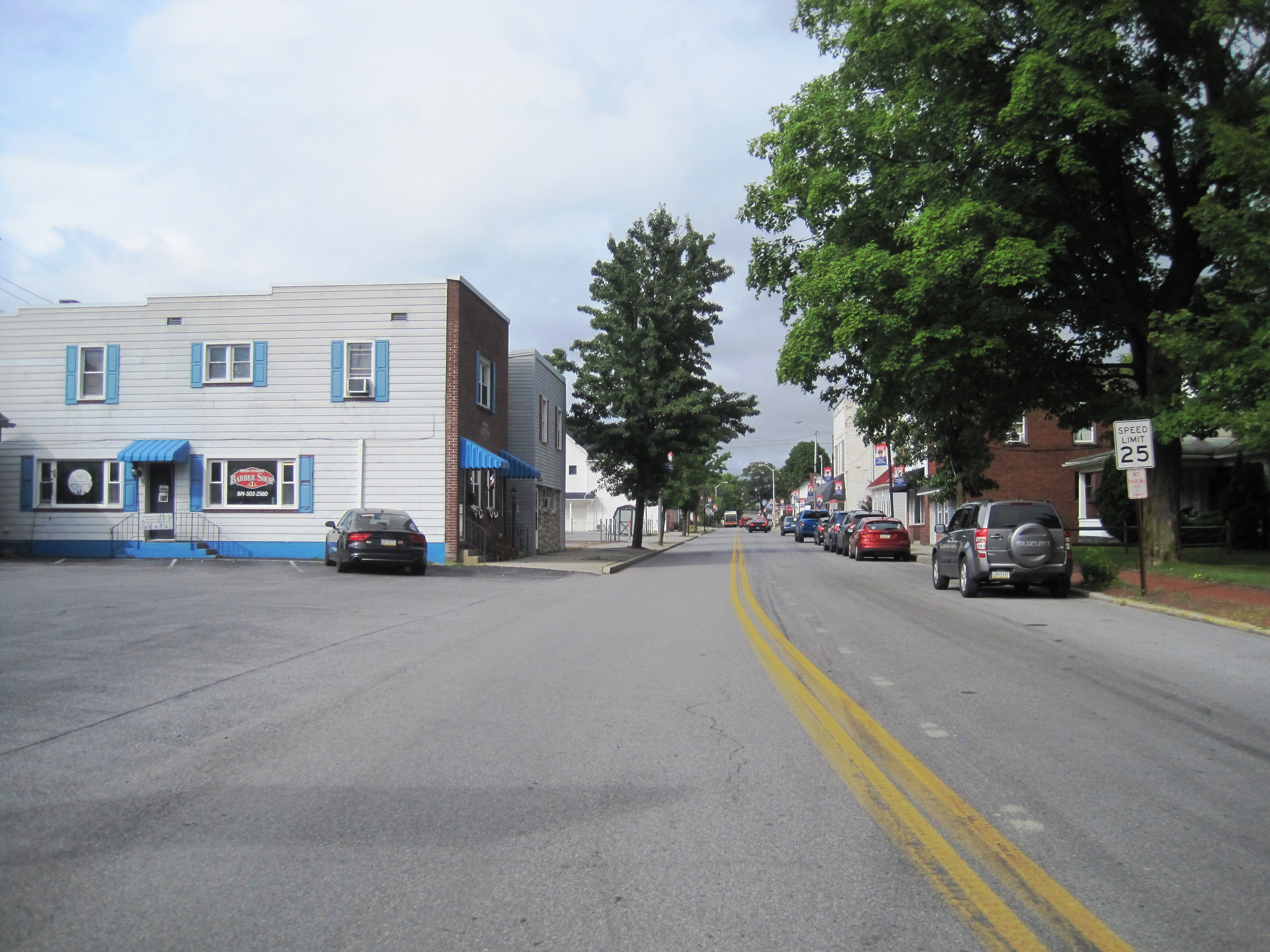
- Main Street in Bellwood

- Location of Bellwood in Blair County, Pennsylvania.
- Coordinates: 40°36′06″N 78°20′01″W
- Country: United States
- State: Pennsylvania
- County: Blair
- Settled: 1877
- Incorporated: 1898

Government
  - Type: Borough Council
  - Mayor: David J. Snyder Jr.

Area
  - Total: 0.47 sq mi (1.23 km^{2})
  - Land: 0.47 sq mi (1.23 km^{2})
  - Water: 0 sq mi (0.00 km^{2})
- Elevation: 1,070 ft (330 m)

Population (2020)
  - Total: 1,827
  - Density: 3,838.9/sq mi (1,482.19/km^{2})
- Time zone: UTC-5 (Eastern (EST))
  - Summer (DST): UTC-4 (EDT)
- Zip code: 16617
- Area code: 814
- FIPS code: 42-05384
- GNIS feature ID: 1214940
- Website: Bellwood Borough

Bellwood is a borough in Blair County, Pennsylvania, United States. It is part of the Altoona, PA Metropolitan Statistical Area. The population was at 1,829 as of the 2020 census.

== Geography ==
According to the United States Census Bureau, the borough has a total area of 0.5 square miles (1.3 km^{2}), all land. Bellwood is a rural area situated in the Tuckahoe Valley, part of the Logan Valley area. Bellwood was originally called Bell's Mills. The Borough of Bellwood is surrounded by the Township of Antis.

== History ==
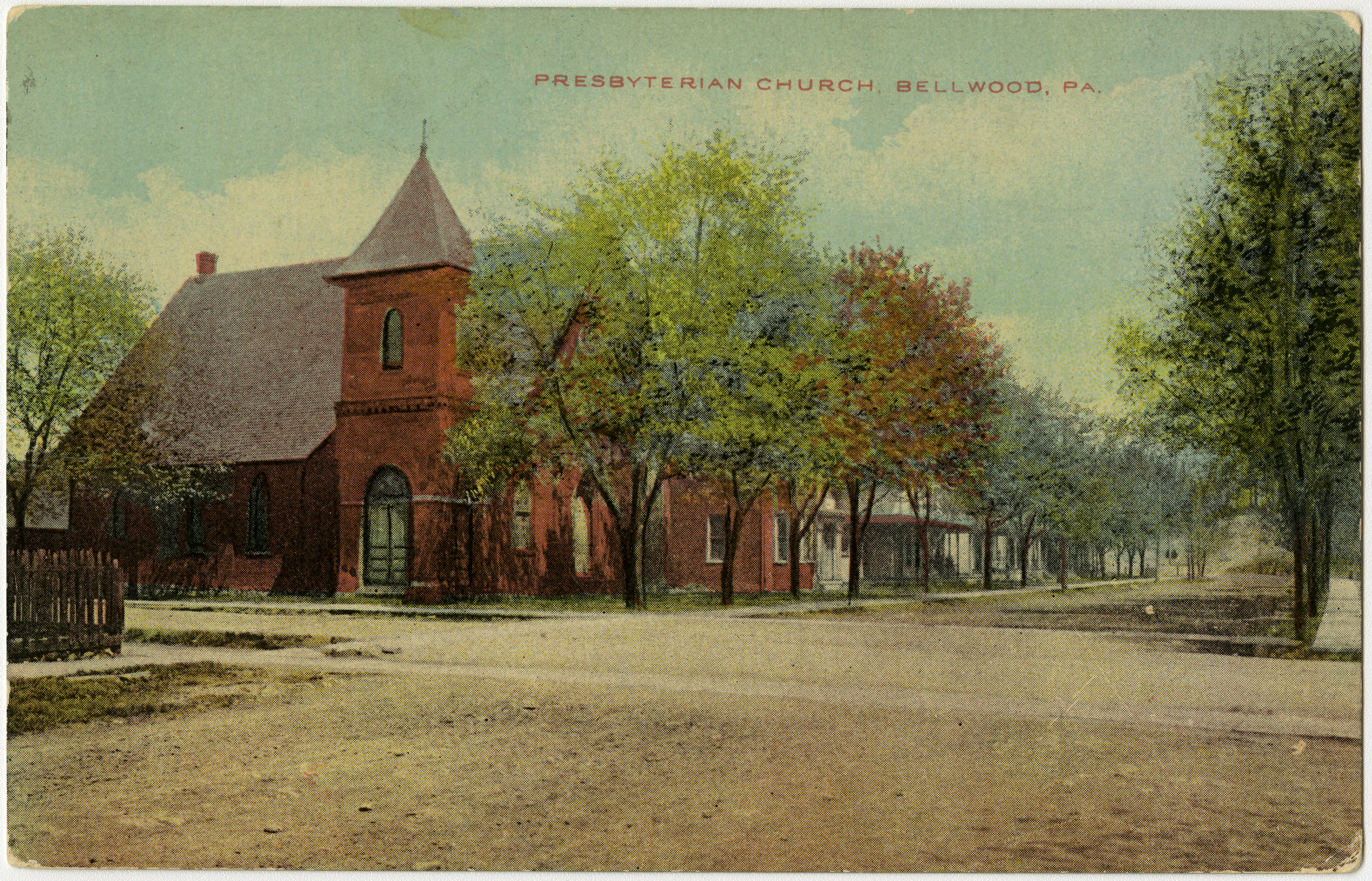
Historic photo of the Bellwood Presbyterian Church

Bellwood was found by the Bell family in the early 1800s. Early industries included iron works, including Elizabeth Furance and Cold Spring Forge. In the 1850s, a narrow-gauge rail line connected Bellwood to Lloydsville, Pennsylvania, eventually becoming part of the Pennsylvania and Northwestern Railraod.

== Demographics ==
Historical population
Census	Pop.	Note	%±
1880	600		—
1890	1,146		91.0%
1900	1,545		34.8%
1910	2,277		47.4%
1920	2,620		15.1%
1930	2,560		−2.3%
1940	2,772		8.3%
1950	2,559		−7.7%
1960	2,330		−8.9%
1970	2,395		2.8%
1980	2,114		−11.7%
1990	1,976		−6.5%
2000	2,016		2.0%
2010	1,828		−9.3%
2020	1,827		−0.1%
2021 (est.)	1,812	▼	−0.8%

As of the census of 2000, there were 2,016 people, 776 households, and 555 families residing in the borough. The population density was 4,361.8 inhabitants per square mile (1,684.1/km^{2}). There were 822 housing units at an average density of 1,778.5 per square mile (686.7/km^{2}). The racial makeup of the borough was 98.81% White, 0.10% African American, 0.05% Native American, 0.20% Asian, 0.20% from other races, and 0.64% from two or more races. Hispanic or Latino of any race were 0.89% of the population.

There were 776 households, out of which 32.7% had children under the age of 18 living with them, 55.5% were married couples living together, 10.8% had a female householder with no husband present, and 28.4% were non-families. 24.5% of all households were made up of individuals, and 12.0% had someone living alone who was 65 years of age or older. The average household size was 2.54 and the average family size was 3.01. In the borough the population was spread out, with 25.5% under the age of 18, 7.3% from 18 to 24, 28.6% from 25 to 44, 21.5% from 45 to 64, and 17.1% who were 65 years of age or older. The median age was 37 years. For every 100 females there were 89.8 males. For every 100 females age 18 and over, there were 84.7 males.

The median income for a household in the borough was $34,595, and the median income for a family was $40,091. Males had a median income of $28,869 versus $17,424 for females. The per capita income for the borough was $14,323. About 5.6% of families and 9.3% of the population were below the poverty line, including 13.7% of those under age 18 and 12.8% of those age 65 or over.

== Community ==
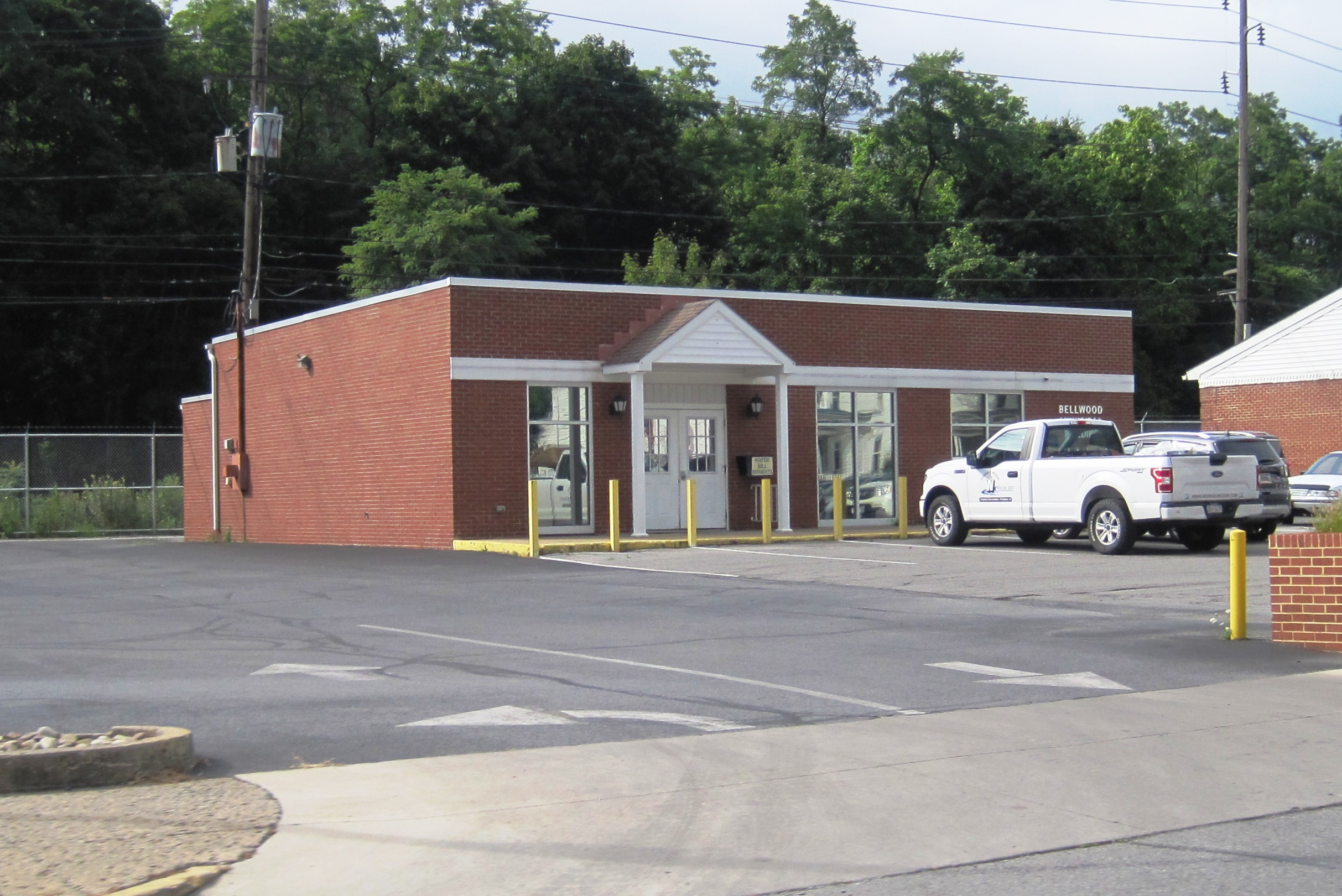
Bellwood Municipal Building

The tight knit community has many special events that occur throughout the year. There are car shows and firemen conventions that occur each year. Each holiday usually has a parade that leads down Main Street. It has great pride in its hometown football team, The Bellwood-Antis Blue Devils; especially when they play their backyard neighbor, Tyrone.

The borough manages a highway department responsible for road maintenance, a police department with 24-hour coverage, and a volunteer fire department.

The borough has a historical amusement park, DelGrosso's Amusement Park, founded in 1907. The park was sold to George Rinard in 1928, who in turn sold it to Fred Delgrosso in 1946.

== Education ==
The school district is Bellwood-Antis School District.

== Notable people ==
- Jennie Margaret Gheer, missionary
- Steve Hatfield, Canadian football player

== Nearby communities ==
Nearby communities include Altoona, Bedford, Coalport, Duncansville, Ebensburg, Hollidaysburg, Huntingdon, Johnstown, State College, Tyrone, and Warriors Mark.

== See also ==
- List of boroughs in Pennsylvania
