= Bellwood-Antis School District =

School district in Pennsylvania

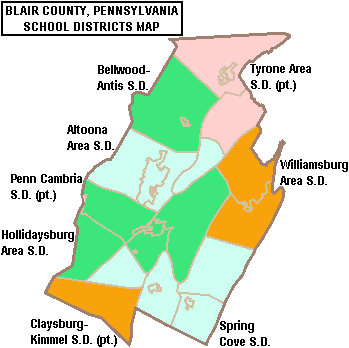

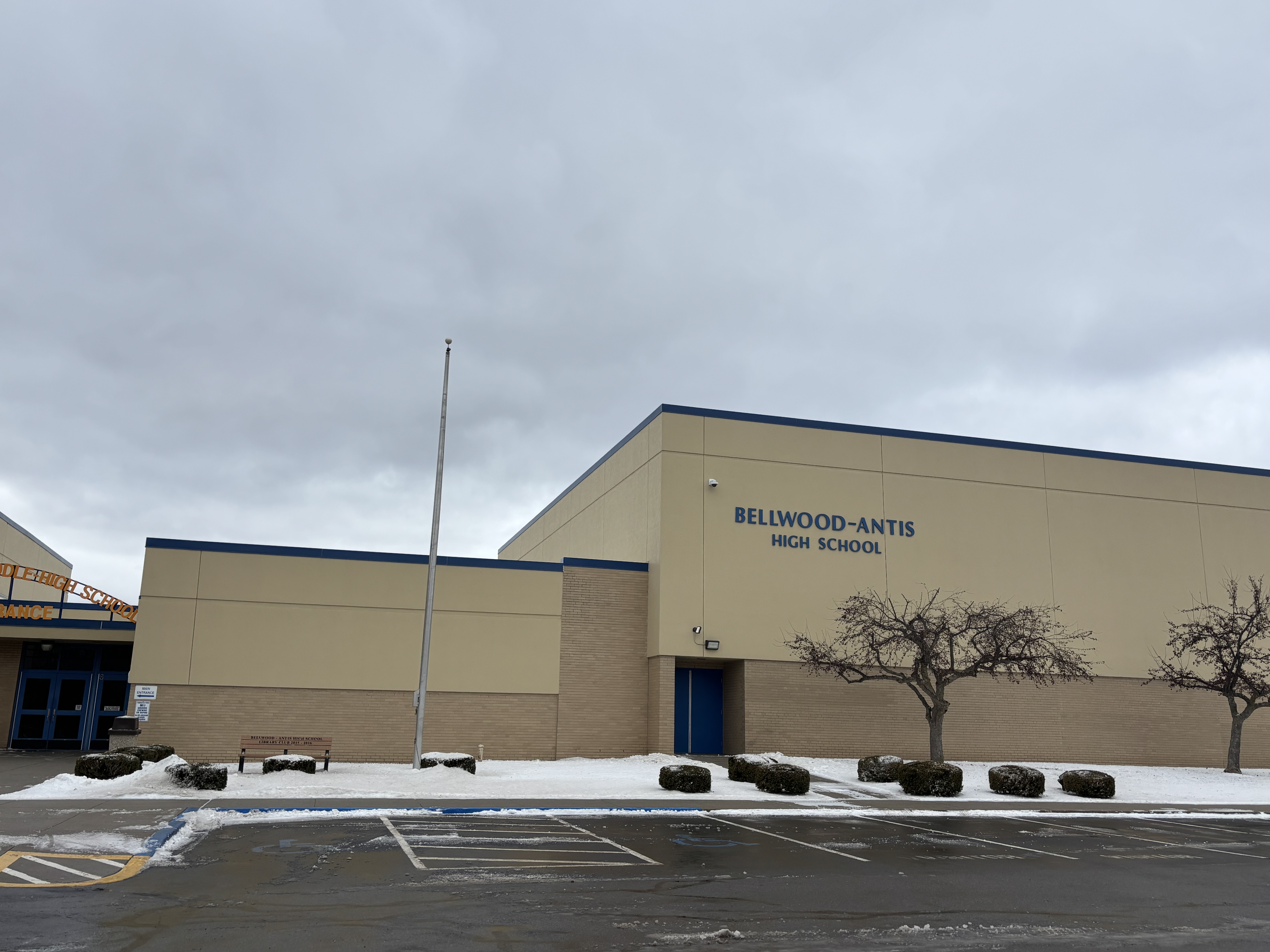

Address
- 400 Martin Street Bellwood, Blair, Pennsylvania, 16617; United States

District information
- Type: Public
- Grades: K-12
- Established: 1938
- Superintendent: Edward DiSabato
- Schools: Myers Elementary, Bellwood-Antis Middle School, Bellwood-Antis High School

Students and staff
- District mascot: Blue Devils
- Colors: Blue and Gold

Other information
- Website: http://www.blwd.k12.pa.us/

The Bellwood-Antis School District is a small, rural public school district located in Blair County, Pennsylvania. It serves the Borough of Bellwood and Antis Township. Bellwood-Antis School District encompasses approximately 63 square miles (160 km^{2}). According to 2020 federal census data, it serves a resident population of 6,478.

The district was established in 1938 when multiple schoolhouses from Antis Township merged with the Bellwood schools. It was the first of its kind in Blair County to offer education to all twelve grades.

The current Superintendent of Schools in the district is Edward DiSabato.

== Schools ==
- Myers Elementary School (Grades K-4)
  220 Martin Street
  Bellwood, Pennsylvania 16617
- Bellwood-Antis Middle School (Grades 5-8)
  400 Martin Street
  Bellwood, Pennsylvania 16617
- Bellwood-Antis High School (Grades 9-12)
  300 Martin Street
  Bellwood, Pennsylvania 16617

== Extracurriculars ==
The district offers a variety of clubs, activities and sports.

=== Athletics ===
The district funds the following sports:

==== High School ====
Boys:
- Baseball - Class AA
- Basketball - Class AAA
- Cross Country - Class A
- Football - Class AA
- Golf - Class AA
- Track and Field - Class AA
- Wrestling - Class AA
- Shares a soccer team with Tyrone Area School District - Class AA
Girls:
- Basketball - AA
- Competitive Spirit - AA
- Cross Country - A
- Softball - AA
- Volleyball - AA
- Track and Field - Class AA

Middle School:

Boys

- Basketball
- Football
- Wrestling

Girls

- Basketball
- Softball
- Volleyball
