= Pennsylvania State Game Lands Number 158 =

Park in the United States

- Location within Pennsylvania Location within the United States
- Location: Blair County; Cambria County
- Nearest city: Altoona
- Coordinates: 40°42′25″N 78°22′45″W
- Area: 17,411 acres (7,046 ha)
- Elevation: 2,392 feet (729 m)
- Max. elevation: 2,640 feet (800 m)
- Min. elevation: 1,160 feet (350 m)
- Owner: Pennsylvania Game Commission

The Pennsylvania State Game Lands Number 158 are Pennsylvania State Game Lands in Blair and Cambria counties in Pennsylvania in the United States, providing hunting, trapping, bird watching, and other activities.

== Geography ==
Pennsylvania State Game Lands Number 158 is located in Antis and Snyder townships in Blair County and in Reade Township in Cambria County. Prince Gallitzin State Park is to the west, Canoe Creek State Park is to the southeast, Rothrock State Forest is to the east, Pennsylvania State Game Lands Number 60 is to the north, Pennsylvania State Game Lands Number 33 is to the northeast, Pennsylvania State Game Lands Number 166, Pennsylvania State Game Lands Number 118, and Pennsylvania State Game Lands Number 147 are to the southeast, Pennsylvania State Game Lands Number 108 touches Game Lands Number 158 on the southwest, Pennsylvania State Game Lands Number 267 and Pennsylvania State Game Lands Number 198 are to the southwest, and Pennsylvania State Game Lands Number 120 is to the northwest. The northern portion of SGL 158 is part of the Moshannon Creek watershed, and the western portion is drained by Clearfield Creek and its tributaries. Both creeks are part of the West Branch Susquehanna River watershed. The southeastern portion is drained by the Little Juniata River and its tributaries. All are ultimately part of the Susquehanna River watershed.

Nearby communities include the city of Altoona, the boroughs of Bellwood, Coalport, and Tyrone, and the former borough of Dean. Unincorporated communities near SGL 158 include Allemans, Alemaden, Bald Eagle, Bear Loop, Beaver Valley, Beccaria, Blain City, Blandburg, Charlottsville, Condron, Dougherty, Dysart, Eyer, Fallentimber, Fiske, Flinton, Fostoria, Frugality, Gardner, Glasgow, Gray, Grazierville, Heverly, Highland Fling, Hollentown, Janesville, Lloydville, Lyleville, Mountaindale, Nealmont, Northwood, Olivia, Pennington, Reighton, Richland, Roots, Rosebud, Skelp, Spring Mount, Stover, Tippletown, Tipton, Utahville, Vail, Van Ormer, and Viola. Pennsylvania Route 453 runs along the northeast border of the Game Lands, the highway carrying Interstate 99 and U.S. Route 220 parallels to the southeast, Pennsylvania Route 865 forms the divide between SGL 158 and SGL 108, and Pennsylvania Route 253 parallels to the northeast.

== Statistics ==
SGL 158 was entered into the Geographic Names Information System on 2 August 1979 as identification number 1188459, listing the elevation as 2,392 feet (729 m). It consists of a total of 17,411 acres (7,046 ha) in one parcel. Elevations range from 1,160 feet (350 m) on the northeast slope to 2,640 feet (800 m) in the main parcel.

== Biology ==
Hunting, trapping and furtaking opportunities include deer (Odocoileus virgianus), Ruffed grouse (Bonasa umbellus), squirrel (Sciurus carolinensis), and turkey (Meleagris gallopavo).

== See also ==
- Pennsylvania State Game Lands
- Pennsylvania State Game Lands Number 26, also located in Blair and Cambria Counties
- Pennsylvania State Game Lands Number 60, also located in Blair and Cambria Counties
- Pennsylvania State Game Lands Number 73, also located in Blair County
- Pennsylvania State Game Lands Number 108, also located in Blair and Cambria Counties
- Pennsylvania State Game Lands Number 118, also located in Blair County
- Pennsylvania State Game Lands Number 147, also located in Blair County
- Pennsylvania State Game Lands Number 166, also located in Blair and Huntingdon Counties
