= Olivia, Pennsylvania =

Unincorporated community in Pennsylvania, US

- Census-designated place
- Location within Pennsylvania Location within the United States
- Coordinates: 40°42′49″N 78°12′09″W
- Country: United States
- State: Pennsylvania
- County: Blair
- Township: Snyder

Area
  - Total: 0.085 sq mi (0.22 km^{2})
  - Land: 0.085 sq mi (0.22 km^{2})
  - Water: 0 sq mi (0.00 km^{2})
- Elevation: 1,047 ft (319 m)

Population (2020)
  - Total: 66
  - Density: 780.4/sq mi (301.32/km^{2})
- Time zone: UTC-5 (Eastern (EST))
  - Summer (DST): UTC-4 (EDT)
- ZIP Code: 16686 (Tyrone)
- Area codes: 814/582
- FIPS code: 42-56761
- GNIS feature ID: 2805535

Olivia is an unincorporated community and census-designated place (CDP) in Blair County, Pennsylvania, United States. It was first listed as a CDP prior to the 2020 census.

The CDP is in northern Blair County, in the northeastern part of Snyder Township, along the north side of South Eagle Valley Road (old U.S. Route 220). It is 3.5 miles (5.6 km) northeast of Tyrone and 1.5 miles (2.4 km) southwest of Bald Eagle. The community is on the north side of the valley of Bald Eagle Creek, which flows southwestward to join the Little Juniata River in Tyrone.

== Demographics ==
Historical population
| Census | Pop. | Note | %± |
|---|---|---|---|
| 2020 | 66 | | — |
U.S. Decennial Census

== Education ==
The school district is the Tyrone Area School District.
