= Tyrone Forge, Pennsylvania =

Unincorporated community in Pennsylvania, US

- Census-designated place
- Location within Pennsylvania Location within the United States
- Coordinates: 40°39′37″N 78°13′21″W
- Country: United States
- State: Pennsylvania
- County: Blair
- Township: Snyder

Area
  - Total: 0.14 sq mi (0.36 km^{2})
  - Land: 0.14 sq mi (0.36 km^{2})
  - Water: 0 sq mi (0.0 km^{2})
- Elevation: 965 ft (294 m)
- Time zone: UTC-5 (Eastern (EST))
  - Summer (DST): UTC-4 (EDT)
- ZIP Code: 16686 (Tyrone)
- Area codes: 814/582
- FIPS code: 42-78186
- GNIS feature ID: 2805574

Tyrone Forge is an unincorporated community and census-designated place (CDP) in Blair County, Pennsylvania, United States. It was first listed as a CDP prior to the 2020 census.

The CDP is in northeastern Blair County, in the southeastern part of Snyder Township. It sits on the west bank of the Little Juniata River at the eastern end of its water gap between Brush Mountain and Bald Eagle Mountain. To the east, across the river, is the community of Ironville, while the borough of Tyrone is 1.5 miles (2.4 km) to the west at the other end of the water gap. Tyrone Forge is bordered to the north by the Pittsburgh Line of the Norfolk Southern Railway. Pennsylvania Route 453 runs just north of the railway, connecting Tyrone to the west with Birmingham to the southeast.

== Education ==
The school district is the Tyrone Area School District.
