= Ironville, Pennsylvania =

Unincorporated community in Pennsylvania, US

- Census-designated place
- Location within Pennsylvania Location within the United States
- Coordinates: 40°39′31″N 78°12′56″W
- Country: United States
- State: Pennsylvania
- County: Blair
- Township: Snyder

Area
  - Total: 0.081 sq mi (0.21 km^{2})
  - Land: 0.081 sq mi (0.21 km^{2})
  - Water: 0 sq mi (0.00 km^{2})
- Elevation: 974 ft (297 m)

Population (2020)
  - Total: 60
  - Density: 742.7/sq mi (286.77/km^{2})
- Time zone: UTC-5 (Eastern (EST))
  - Summer (DST): UTC-4 (EDT)
- ZIP Code: 16686 (Tyrone)
- Area codes: 814/582
- FIPS code: 42-37136
- GNIS feature ID: 2805513

Ironville is an unincorporated community and census-designated place (CDP) in Blair County, Pennsylvania, United States. It was first listed as a CDP prior to the 2020 census.

== Geography ==
Ironville is in northern Blair County, in the southeastern corner of Snyder Township. It sits in a bend on the north and east side of the Little Juniata River, just east of where the river cuts through the water gap between the northeast end of Brush Mountain and the southwest end of Bald Eagle Mountain. It is bordered to the west, across the river, by Tyrone Forge.

Pennsylvania Route 453 forms the northeastern border of the CDP; it leads northwest 1.5 miles (2.4 km) to Tyrone and southeast the same distance to Birmingham. The Pittsburgh Line of the Norfolk Southern Railway passes through the east side of Ironville.

== Demographics ==
Historical population
Census	Pop.	Note	%±
2020	60		—
U.S. Decennial Census

== Education ==
The school district is the Tyrone Area School District.
