= Vail, Pennsylvania =

Unincorporated community in Pennsylvania, US

- Census-designated place
- Location within Pennsylvania Location within the United States
- Coordinates: 40°42′04″N 78°12′50″W
- Country: United States
- State: Pennsylvania
- County: Blair
- Township: Snyder

Area
  - Total: 0.15 sq mi (0.40 km^{2})
  - Land: 0.15 sq mi (0.40 km^{2})
  - Water: 0 sq mi (0.0 km^{2})
- Elevation: 1,020 ft (310 m)
- Time zone: UTC-5 (Eastern (EST))
  - Summer (DST): UTC-4 (EDT)
- ZIP Code: 16686 (Tyrone)
- Area codes: 814/582
- FIPS code: 42-79496
- GNIS feature ID: 2805576

Vail is an unincorporated community and census-designated place (CDP) in Blair County, Pennsylvania, United States. It was first listed as a CDP prior to the 2020 census.

The CDP is in northern Blair County, in the eastern part of Snyder Township. It is bordered to the northwest by Bald Eagle Creek and to the southeast by Interstate 99/U.S. Route 220. South Eagle Valley Road (old US 220) is the main road through the community; it leads southwest 9 miles (14 km) to Tyrone and northeast 2 miles (3 km) to Bald Eagle.

== Education ==
The school district is the Tyrone Area School District.
