= Castanea (disambiguation) =

Castanea is a plant genus which includes the chestnuts and chinkapins.

Castanea may also refer to:

- Castanea (Thessaly), an ancient city of Thessaly, Greece
- Castanea, Pennsylvania, a census-designated place (CDP)
- Castanea Township, Pennsylvania, which surrounds the CDP of the same name
- Castanea (journal), the professional journal of the Southern Appalachian Botanical Club
- Castanea delle Furie, a city near Messina, Italy
