= U.S. Route 220 in Pennsylvania =

Section of U.S. Highway in Pennsylvania

U.S. Route 220
- US 220 highlighted in red and alternate routes in blue

Route information
- Auxiliary route of US 20
- Maintained by PennDOT
- Length: 248 mi (399 km)

Major junctions
- South end: US 220 at the Maryland state line near Cumberland, MD
- US 30 in Bedford; US 22 near Hollidaysburg; US 322 from Port Matilda to State College; I-80 / PA 26 near Bellefonte; I-99 / US 15 in Williamsport; I-180 in Pennsdale; US 6 in Towanda
- North end: I-86 / NY 17 in South Waverly

Location
- Country: United States
- State: Pennsylvania
- Counties: Bedford, Blair, Centre, Clinton, Lycoming, Sullivan, Bradford

Highway system
- United States Numbered Highway System; List; Special; Divided; Pennsylvania State Route System; Interstate; US; State; Scenic; Legislative
← US 219	→ PA 221
← PA 709	→ PA 711
← PA 827	→ PA 829

U.S. Route 220 (US 220) is a U.S. Highway that is a spur route of US 20. It runs from Rockingham, North Carolina, north to South Waverly, Pennsylvania. In the state of Pennsylvania, the route runs 248 miles (399 km) from the Maryland border in Cumberland Valley Township, Bedford County northeast to an interchange with I-86/NY 17 in South Waverly, Bradford County a short distance south of the New York border. Through the state, US 220 passes through the cities and towns of Bedford, Altoona, State College, Lock Haven, Williamsport, and Towanda. US 220 is concurrent with the entire completed Pennsylvania segment of I-99 between Bedford and Bellefonte. US 220 is also a freeway around Bedford, along the I-80 concurrency between Bellefonte and Mill Hall, between Mill Hall and Jersey Shore, from the western end of Williamsport to near Halls (where it is concurrent with I-180 east of downtown Williamsport), and near the New York border. The remainder of US 220 in Pennsylvania is mostly a two-lane surface road.

== Route description ==
=== Maryland to Bellefonte ===
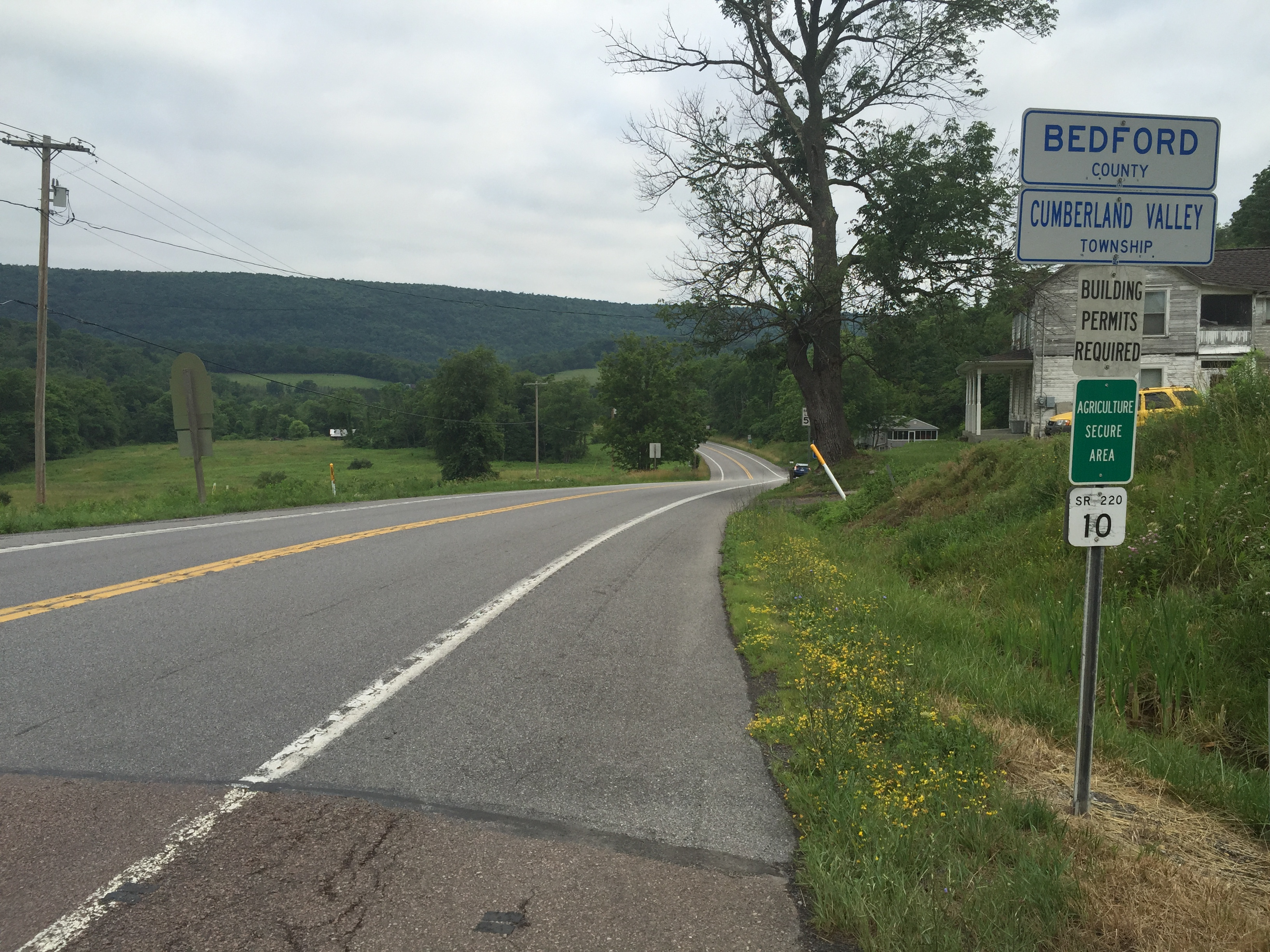
View north along US 220 entering Pennsylvania from Maryland in Cumberland Valley Township

US 220 enters Pennsylvania from Maryland in Cumberland Valley Township, Bedford County to the north of Cumberland, Maryland. From the state line, the route heads northeast as a two-lane undivided road as it passes through a narrow agricultural valley surrounded by forested mountains. As the highway approaches Bedford, US 220 Business (US 220 Bus.) splits off to head into Bedford while US 220 bypasses the borough to the west. The bypass is initially two lanes, but widens into a four-lane freeway before it reaches an interchange with US 30 Bus. A short distance later, the route comes to a cloverleaf interchange with US 30, which bypasses downtown Bedford to the north as a freeway. The US 220 freeway continues north away from Bedford to a trumpet interchange that serves US 220 Bus. and also provides indirect access to I-70/I-76 (Pennsylvania Turnpike). It is at this interchange that I-99 begins and becomes concurrent with US 220.

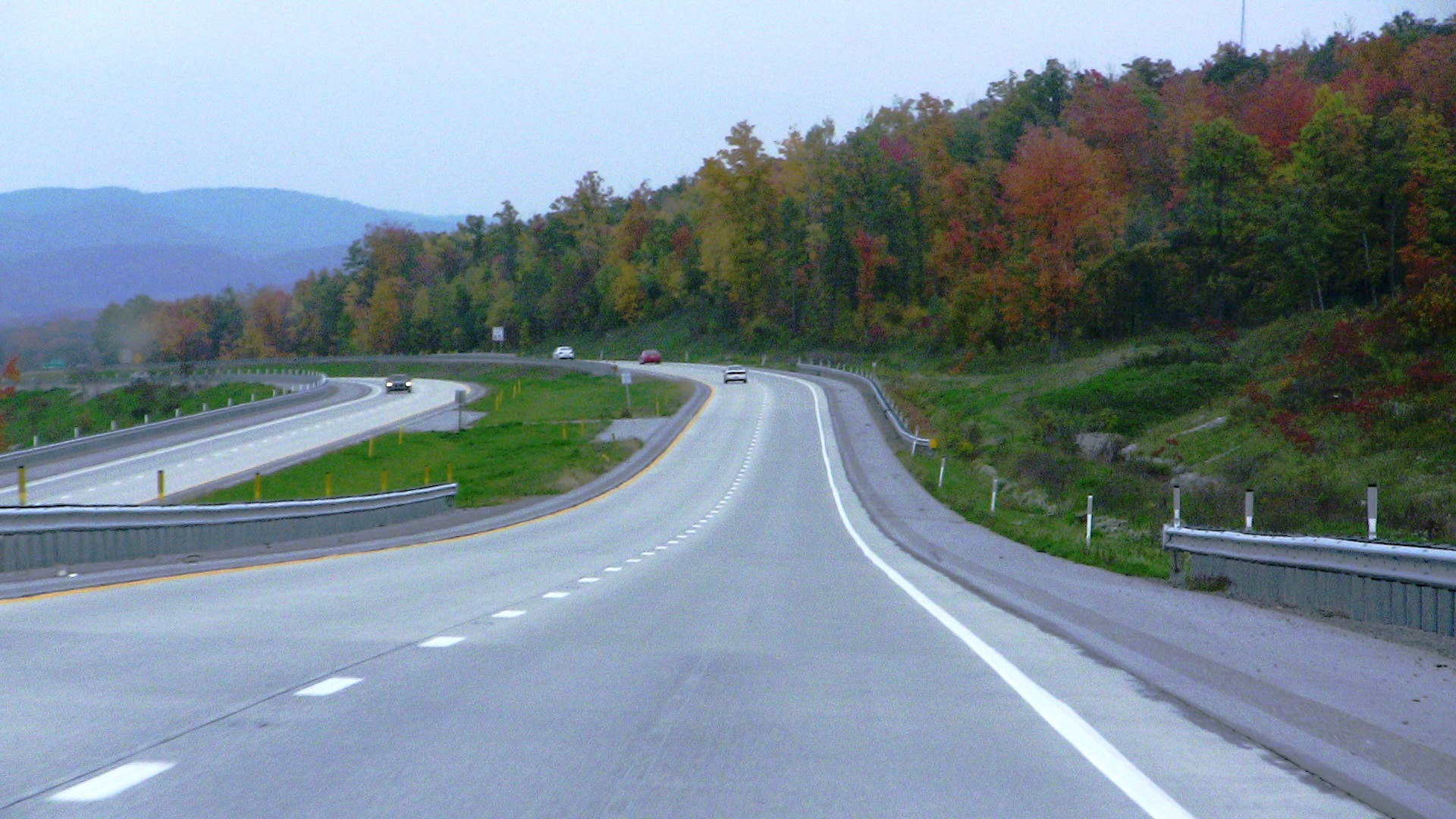
I-99/US 220 north near Bald Eagle, Pennsylvania in October 2011

I-99/US 220 continues north through farmland and continues to the next interchange near Cessna, which serves Pennsylvania Route 56 (PA 56) and the northern terminus of US 220 Bus. Farther north, the freeway comes to the PA 869 exit in Saint Clairsville. The highway continues through a mix of farms and forests, with a diamond interchange at Sarah Furnace Road that provides access to Blue Knob State Park. I-99/US 220 crosses into Blair County and comes to an interchange with the southern terminus of US 220 Bus. that serves the Altoona area. The freeway passes Claysburg and East Freedom before it reaches a trumpet interchange that provides access to PA 36 and PA 164 to the east. The highway bypasses Newry to the east prior to heading into more developed surroundings as it enters the Hollidaysburg area. Here, I-99/US 220 has an interchange that serves US 22 and PA 764. Past this interchange, the freeway curves east and heads into Altoona, where it comes to an interchange with US 220 Bus. in a commercial area near the Logan Valley Mall. The highway curves north again and comes to the Frankstown Road exit which provides access to PA 36 and Peoples Natural Gas Field, home of the Altoona Curve baseball team. I-99/US 220 continues along the eastern edge of Altoona and comes to the 17th Street exit which serves downtown Altoona. The road continues between development to the west and forested mountains to the east as it heads away from Altoona and reaches an interchange with the northern terminus of PA 764.

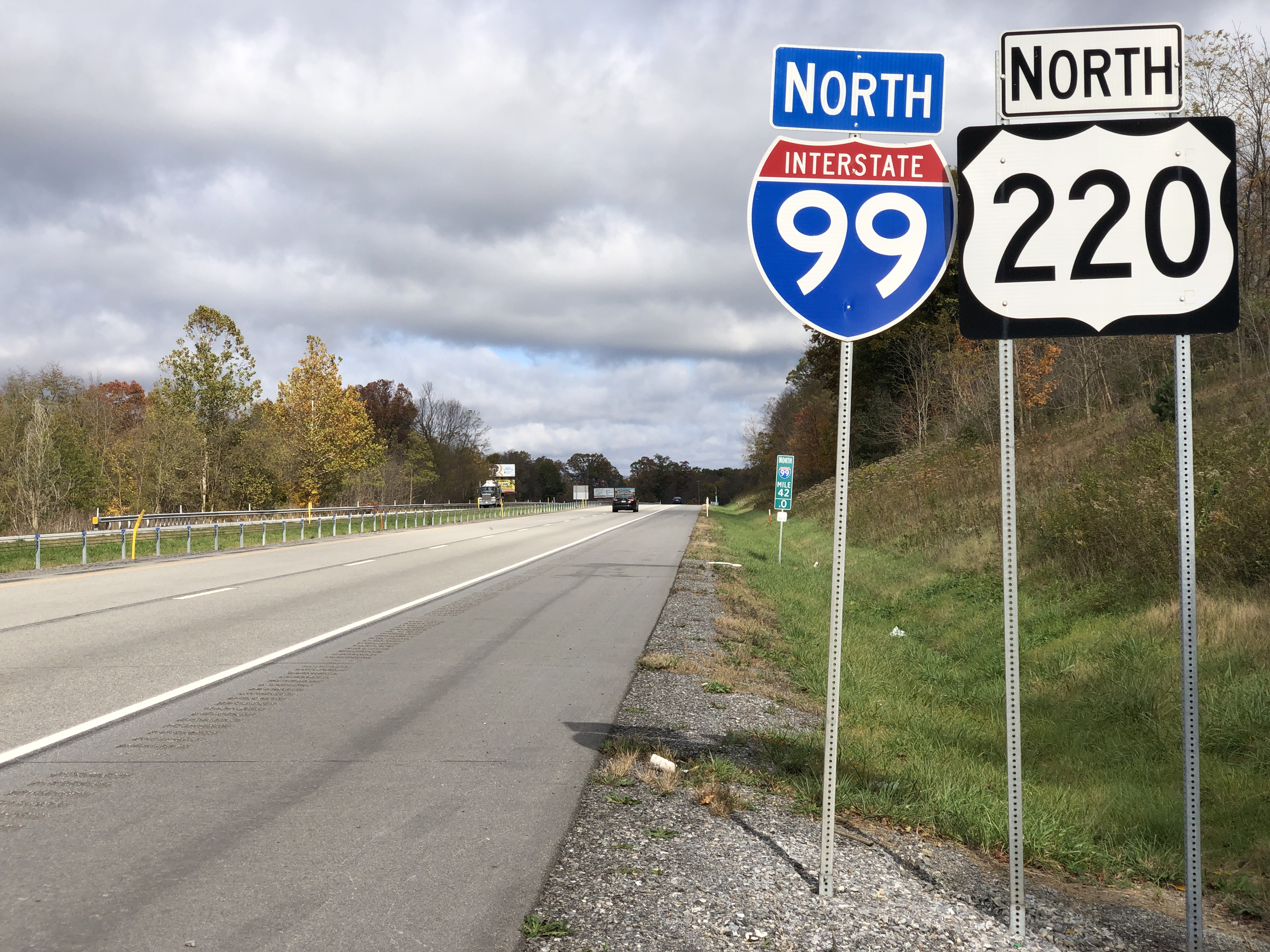
I-99 and US 220 northbound past PA 865 near Bellwood

I-99/US 220 continues northeast between a mountain to the east in an agricultural valley to the west, coming to an interchange with the southern terminus of PA 865 near Bellwood. Near Tipton, the freeway has a trumpet interchange with US 220 Bus. that provides access to DelGrosso's Amusement Park. The highway continues to Tyrone, where it crosses the Little Juniata River before an interchange with PA 453. Past Tyrone, I-99/US 220 passes through forested areas and reaches a diamond interchange that serves PA 350 and the northern terminus of US 220 Bus. near Bald Eagle. From here, the freeway continues into Centre County and runs through rural areas before turning north to bypass Port Matilda to the west. I-99/US 220 has an interchange with the southern terminus of US 220 Alternate (US 220 Alt.) before the two routes merge into the US 322 freeway and head east concurrent with US 322. The freeway heads northeast away from Port Matilda and continues through more forests. I-99/US 220/US 322 curves southeast and reaches an interchange with Gray's Woods Boulevard near Gray's Woods. A short distance later, US 322 Bus. splits off at a northbound exit and southbound entrance to head into State College. Immediately after this interchange, a southbound exit and northbound entrance serves Valley Vista Drive and provides access to US 322 Bus. from southbound I-99/US 220/westbound US 322. The freeway continues east into more developed areas with some woods and comes to a diamond interchange at Waddle Road that serves Toftrees. The highway passes to the north of the Pennsylvania State University campus before I-99/US 220 split from the US 322 freeway at an interchange that also has access to the university by way of East Park Avenue.

Past US 322, I-99/US 220 continues northeast away from State College through a mix of farmland and woodland. An interchange serves Shiloh Road before the highway comes to the PA 150 exit near State Correctional Institution – Rockview. The freeway has a northbound exit and southbound entrance at Harrison Road before it merges with PA 26. From here, I-99 and US 220 continue north concurrent with PA 26 as the highway heads through farmland to the east of Bellefonte. An interchange at PA 550 provides access to Bellefonte. The highway curves to the northeast and the freeway and I-99 end before the highway reaches an interchange with I-80. At this interchange, PA 26 continues to the northeast as a two-lane road. US 220 Alt. rejoins from the west along I-80, and US 220 heads east concurrent with I-80 on a four-lane freeway.

=== Bellefonte to Williamsport ===
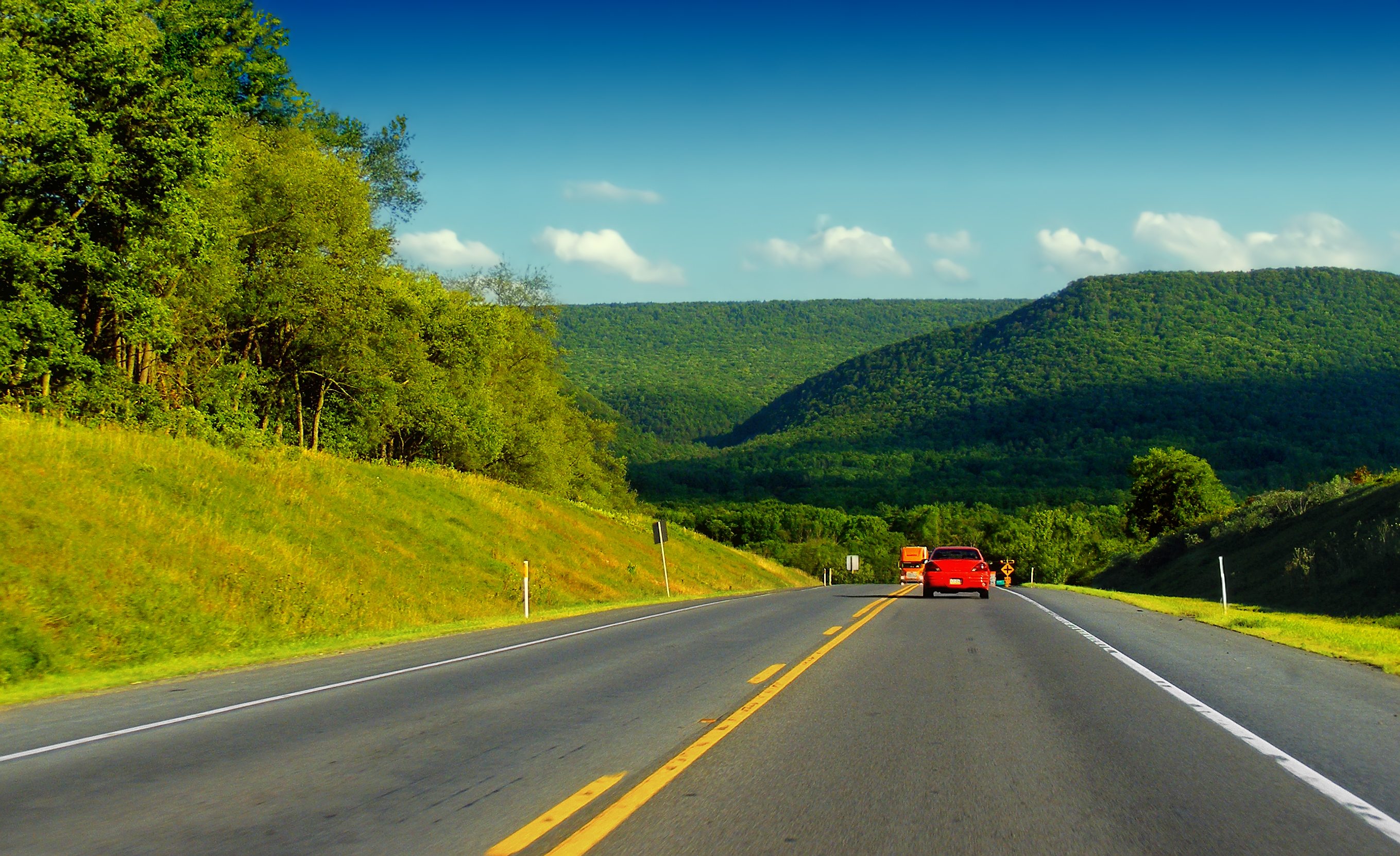
US 220 near I-80 exit 178 in Clinton County

I-80 and US 220 head northeast through a mix of woodland and farms, crossing into Clinton County. Here, the highway comes to a diamond interchange with PA 64. US 220 continues east along I-80 before it splits from the interstate at another diamond interchange. From here, US 220 heads northwest as a two-lane undivided surface road through farmland with some development. The route transitions into a four-lane freeway as it comes to an interchange with PA 64 and PA 477 to the south of Mill Hall. The freeway passes through forested mountains before bypassing Mill Hall to the east. US 220 curves east and has a trumpet interchange that serves PA 150. The highway turns northeast and crosses Bald Eagle Creek prior to a diamond interchange with the eastern terminus of PA 120 to the south of Lock Haven. US 220 continues east and crosses Bald Eagle Creek again before leaving the Lock Haven area and heading into rural surroundings. The route has an interchange with McElhattan Drive that serves McElhattan. The freeway passes through farmland and crosses the West Branch Susquehanna River before it comes to an interchange with the northern terminus of PA 150 near Avis. The US 220 freeway bypasses Avis to the southeast and continues to the PA 44 exit, at which point that route joins US 220.

The freeway crosses Pine Creek into Lycoming County and heads to the north of Jersey Shore. An interchange at Thomas Street provides access to the borough. At the east end of Jersey Shore, PA 44 splits from the US 220 freeway to head south. US 220 continues east to the north of the West Branch Susquehanna River into rural areas. The freeway ends prior to an at-grade intersection with the southern terminus of PA 287, at which point US 220 continues east as a four-lane divided surface road. The median widens as the highway passes through Larrys Creek. The route continues east through farmland with some development, curving northeast before heading back to the east. US 220 becomes a freeway again as it approaches Williamsport, with the first exit being a northbound exit and southbound entrance at 4th Street. The highway heads into Williamsport and heads into industrial areas to the north of the river, with an interchange at Reach Road serving the Reach Road Industrial Park. The freeway passes over Lycoming Creek immediately before an interchange with US 15, which currently serves as the southern terminus of I-99's northern section.

=== Williamsport to South Waverly ===
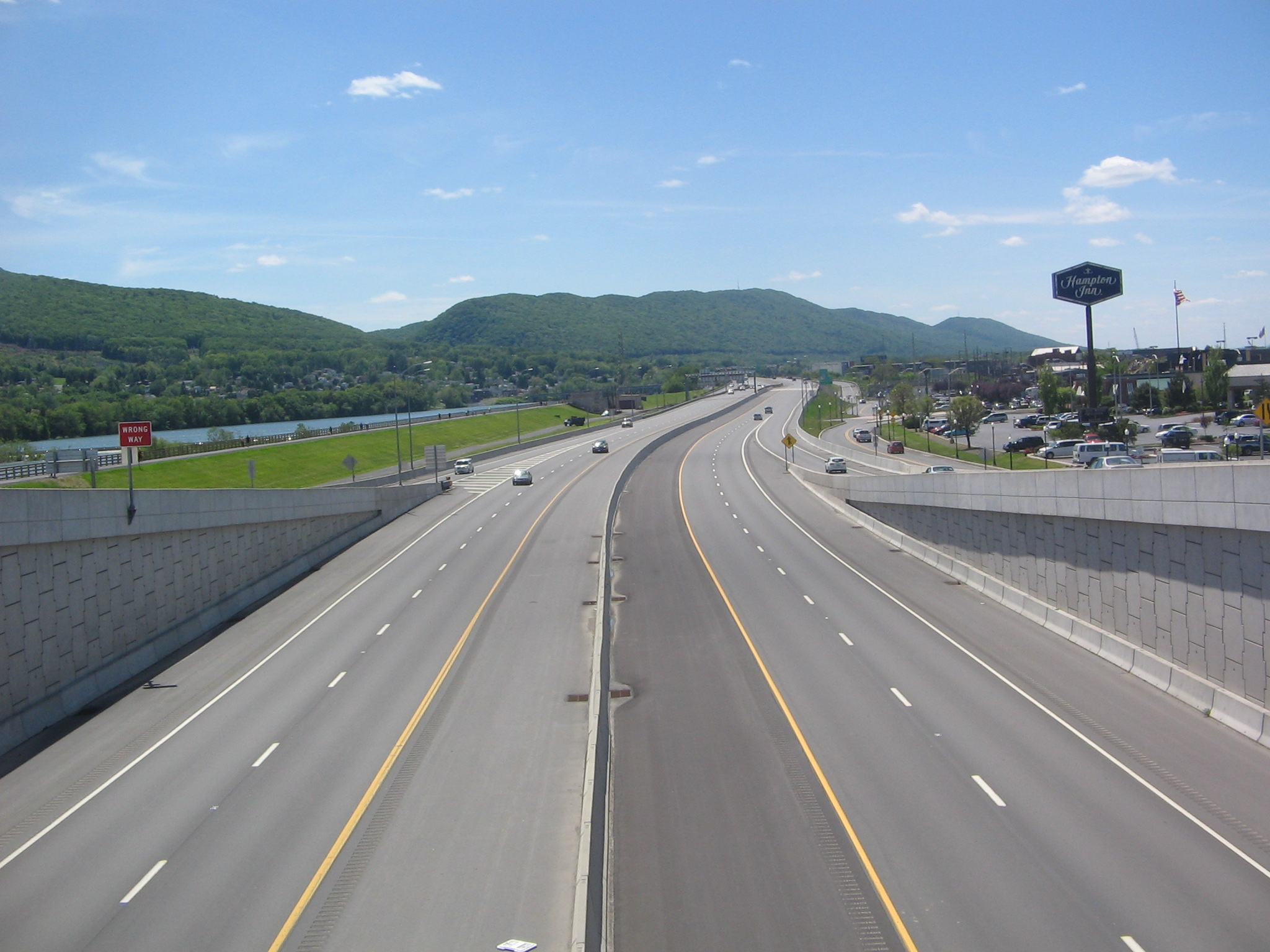
Looking west on I-180/US 15/US 220 from the Carl E. Stotz Memorial Little League Bridge in Williamsport

At this point, I-180 begins and US 220 continues east concurrent with I-180 and US 15. The highway continues alongside the West Branch Susquehanna River and has an interchange at Maynard Street that serves the Pennsylvania College of Technology and a northbound exit and southbound entrance at Hepburn Street. In downtown Williamsport, US 15 splits from I-180 and US 220 by heading southeast across the river into South Williamsport. I-180/US 220 continues northeast through more developed areas, with a southbound exit and northbound entrance at Basin Street. The freeway leaves the city limits and has an interchange with Northway Road in Faxon. The highway has an interchange with 3rd Street prior to crossing the Loyalsock Creek and heading to the north of Montoursville. In this area, I-180/US 220 comes to an interchange with the southern terminus of PA 87. On the eastern edge of Montoursville, an interchange is located at Fairfield Road. The freeway heads into a mix of farmland and woodland, reaching an interchange that serves the Lycoming Mall. At the next interchange, US 220 splits from I-180.

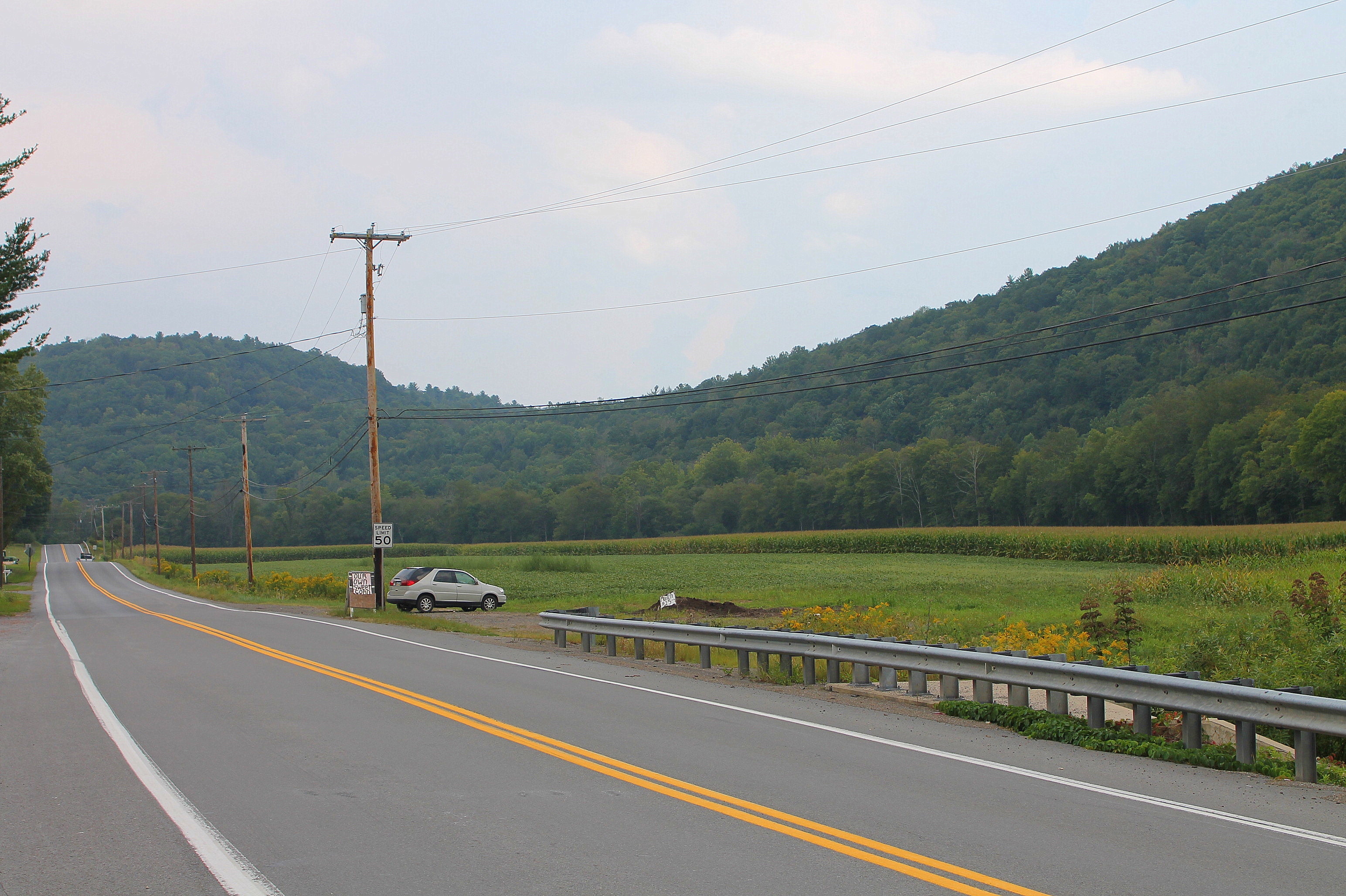
US 220 in Shrewsbury Township in Lycoming County

Upon splitting from I-180, US 220 heads east as a two-lane undivided surface road through agricultural areas. The route reaches Hughesville, where it intersects the northern terminus of PA 405. At this point, US 220 turns north and continues to Picture Rocks. Here, the route has a junction with the eastern terminus of PA 864. Past Picture Rocks, the road winds northeast along the banks of Muncy Creek through forested areas. US 220 enters Sullivan County and intersects PA 42 in Beech Glen. The two routes run north together until Muncy Valley, where PA 42 splits to the northwest. US 220 continues northeast concurrent with PA 42 Truck through more forests to Laporte, where it has an intersection with the northern terminus of PA 42 and PA 42 Truck. A short distance north of Laporte, the route encounters the southern terminus of PA 154. The road passes through more rural areas before PA 87 joins in from the west prior to reaching Dushore. In Dushore, PA 87 splits to the east. US 220 heads north through a mix of fields and forests as it continues into Bradford County. The route passes through New Albany before continuing north through more forests. In Monroe, the road has an intersection with the eastern terminus of PA 414.

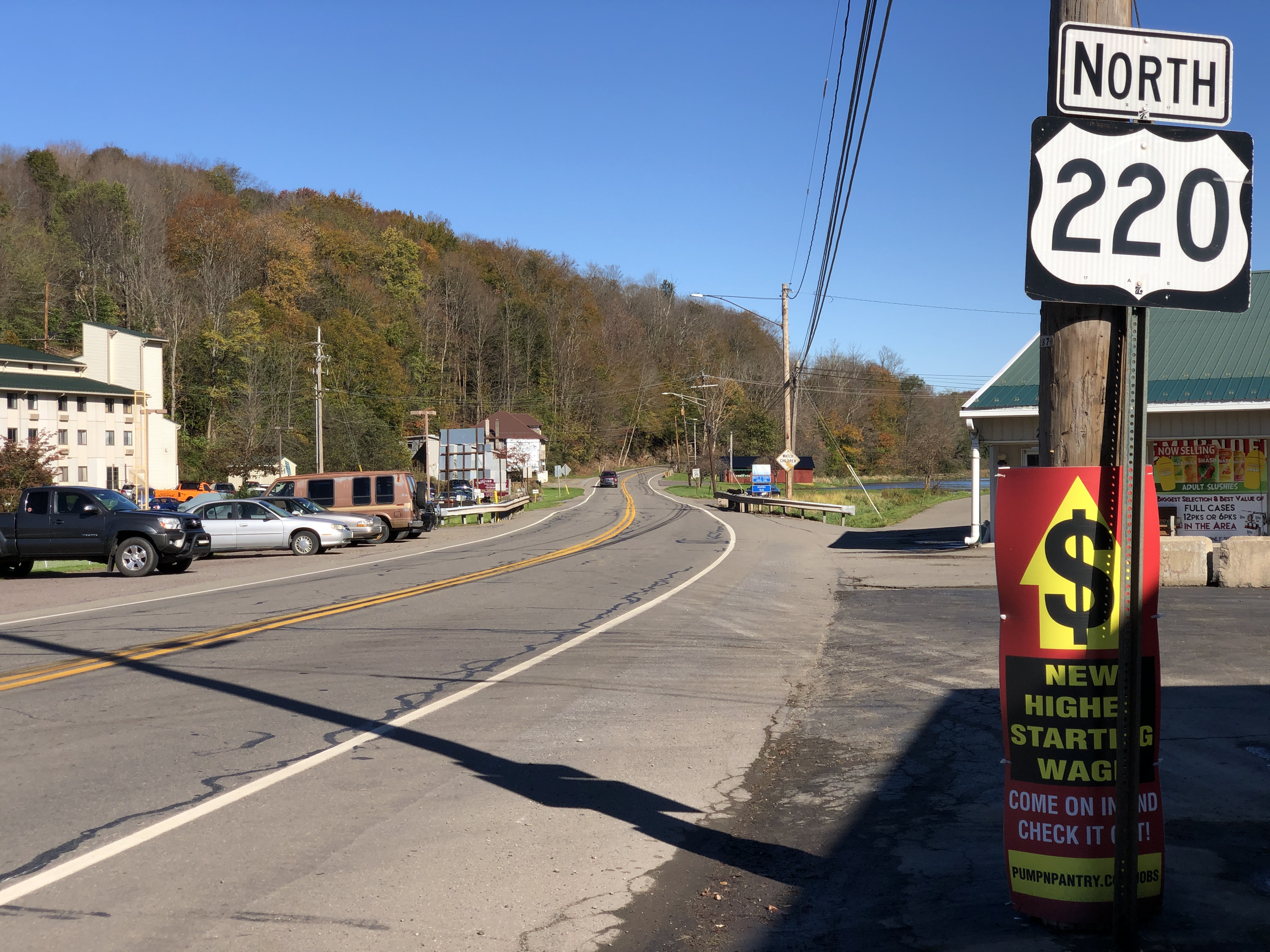
US 220 northbound past PA 87 in Dushore

US 220 heads northeast through more rural areas before bypassing Towanda to the west. The two-lane undivided bypass has an interchange at Patterson Boulevard that provides access to the borough. The route curves west then northwest as it comes to a diamond interchange with US 6. Past this, US 220 continues north as a two-lane undivided road through a mix of farmland and woodland along the west bank of the Susquehanna River, passing through Ulster and Milan. South of Athens, the route intersects the southern terminus of PA 199 before turning into a four-lane freeway that bypasses the Penn-York Valley boroughs of Athens, Sayre, and South Waverly to the west. US 220 crosses the Chemung River and comes to a diamond interchange at West Pine Street that serves Athens. The highway continues between the river to the west and developed areas to the east before it reaches an interchange at Mile Lane Road that serves Sayre and South Waverly. The route enters South Waverly and comes to its northern terminus at an interchange with I-86/NY 17, which is maintained by the state of New York despite being in Pennsylvania. Past the northern terminus, the road crosses the New York border, intersects Broad Street, and ends a very short distance later at Chemung Street in Waverly.

== History ==
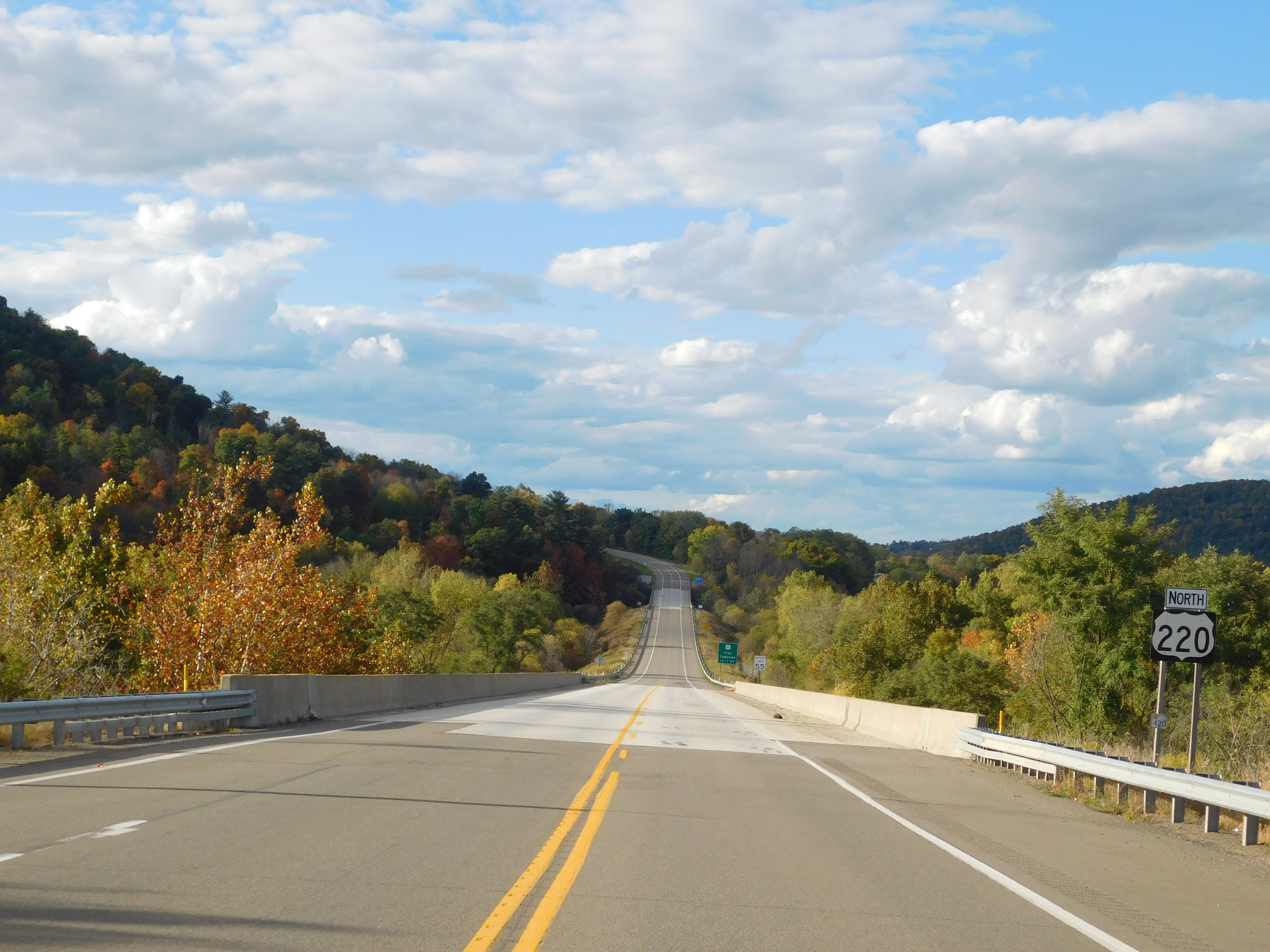
US 220 northbound in Towanda

In the 19th century, the road that would eventually become US 220 between Hollidaysburg and Bedford was a turnpike, appropriately called the Hollidaysburg and Bedford Turnpike, chartered in 1835. Unlike its successors, this highway veered east to Hollidaysburg along modern-day PA 36. The highway was still referred to as such as late as 1866. Today, this highway is William Penn Road, the Dunnings Highway, and a section of US 220 BUS in Bedford.

US 220 was proposed in 1926, along with the rest of the National Highway System. At its inception, the highway south of Bedford followed its current path, but it branched off of the modern highway, using US 220 BUS through Bedford. North of here, the highway closely parallelled its modern counterpart, following the old Hollidaysburg and Bedford Turnpike. It picked up a concurrency with US 22 at Duncansville headed east to Hollidaysburg, then followed modern-day PA 36 north to a junction with Plank Road, and then followed US 220 BUS through Altoona. It then passed through the Tuckahoe Valley northeasterly, paralleling the modern-day freeway to the northwest and servicing Tyrone directly. From Port Matilda, the highway has since become US 220 Alt. to Milesburg. It then passed south along PA 144 to service Bellefonte, and thence along PA 550 and PA 64 to Mill Hall. From here to just outside Avis, the highway is signed PA 150. As PA 150 turns to service the expressway, US 220 continued on to service Jersey Shore directly. At a junction with modern-day PA 44, the highway swung north on that highway. For a few miles, the highway from here has changed little from its original incarnation. It then left the expressway's alignment via Quadrant Route 2014, and left Williamsport north via the Susquehanna Trail, now an old alignment of US 15, and terminated at the New York line at Lawrenceville.

I-99/US 220 northbound/US 322 eastbound in Patton Township

Before the adoption of the highway system in the state, Pennsylvania's highway department petitioned for a redrawing of the highway map through their state to keep each number fully concurrent with existing auto trails. As a result, US 111 was extended over the intended alignment of US 220, and the highway was rerouted to its modern alignment north of Williamsport. Through Williamsport, the highway followed 4th Street, Campbell Street, Park Avenue, Hepburn Street, 7th Street, Market Street, and Washington Street, now Washington Boulevard. Out of Williamsport, the highway is Quadrant Route 2014 to Muncy, then PA 405 to its modern alignment. As a result of this realignment, US 120, US 111, and US 220 bore a concurrency through Williamsport. Through and north of Athens, the route has been superseded by PA 199.

In 1927, Pennsylvania dramatically expanded its own state highway system, and assigned numbers to US highways without existing numbers. PA 64 was assigned to the route south of Bellefonte and PA 44 from there to Mill Hall (which at the time extended to McConnellsburg). From Hughesville north, the highway was signed as a northern extension of PA 42 to the New York line. These designations were deleted the year after.

Few major changes occurred in the highway before the construction of the Bud Shuster Highway. The highway's alignment through Williamsport changed several times before the town was fully bypassed. In 1941, it shifted to its current alignment north of Muncy, in addition to modern-day SR 2036. 1946 saw the swapping of PA 64 and US 220, fully following modern-day US 220 Alt and PA 150. In 1964, PA 36 swapped alignments with US 220 south of Altoona, which now followed Plank Road, bypassing Hollidaysburg.

In the late 1960s the federal government planned a dam in the Bald Eagle Valley, which would flood most of the original alignment through Howard. It was at this time when US 220 was realigned to break away from the original alignment just before Milesburg, pass to the north of Bald Eagle State Park and reunite with its former alignment about 1 mile east of Beech Creek. The old alignment still exists in sections, and is used for access to the reservoir.

=== Freeway alignments ===
The first sections of a freeway alignment of US 220 were begun in the mid-1960s with the construction of I-80 through the state. The first section of freeway solely dedicated to US 220 was opened in 1967 from Avis to Jersey Shore. The next few years saw the rapid development of an expressway/freeway along the US 220 corridor, including the completion of the Bedford Bypass in 1970, and the final section of expressway north of I-80 completed in 1978. The expressway from south of Athens to the Southern Tier Expressway was completed in 1974.

1996 saw the adoption of the designation I-99 between Bedford and I-80.

== Future ==
PennDOT plans to upgrade the interchange with Interstate 80 in Bellefonte to a high-speed expressway-grade interchange, bringing I-99 to Interstate Highway Standards. The project is expected to start in the summer of 2024, following the completion of a related project for a local I-80 interchange with PA 26.

== Major intersections ==
County	Location	mi	km	Exit	Destinations	Notes
Bedford	Cumberland Valley Township				US 220 south – Cumberland	Continuation into Maryland
Bedford	Bedford Township	18.6	29.9		US 220 Bus. north	Southern terminus of US 220 Bus.
Bedford	Bedford Township			Southern end of freeway section		
Bedford	Bedford Township	23.4	37.7		Bedford	Access via US 30 Bus.
Bedford	Bedford Township	23.8	38.3		US 30 – Everett, Greensburg	
Bedford	Bedford Township			1	To I-70 Toll / I-76 Toll / Penna Turnpike – Pittsburgh, Harrisburg I-99 begins	Access via US 220 Bus.; southern terminus of I-99
Bedford	Bedford Township			3	PA 56 (US 220 Bus. south) – Johnstown, Cessna	
Bedford	East St. Clair Township			7	PA 869 – St. Clairsville, Osterburg	
Bedford	King Township			10	Blue Knob State Park	Access via Sarah Furnace Road
Blair	Greenfield Township			15	Claysburg, King	Access via US 220 Bus.
Blair	Freedom Township			23	PA 36 / PA 164 to US 22 east – Roaring Spring, Portage, Hollidaysburg	
Blair	Allegheny Township			28	US 22 – Ebensburg, Hollidaysburg	
Blair	Logan Township			31	Plank Road (US 220 Bus.)	
Blair	Logan Township			32	Frankstown Road to PA 36	
Blair	Logan Township			33	17th Street	Access to Logan Town Centre
Blair	Antis Township			39	PA 764 south – Pinecroft	Northern terminus of PA 764
Blair	Antis Township			41	PA 865 north – Bellwood	Southern terminus of PA 865; former routing of US 220
Blair	Antis Township			45	Tipton, Grazierville	Access via Pleasant Valley Boulevard; access to DelGrosso's Amusement Park
Blair	Tyrone			48	PA 453 – Tyrone	
Blair	Snyder Township			52	PA 350 (US 220 Bus. south) – Bald Eagle, Philipsburg	
Centre	Worth Township			61	Port Matilda	Access via US 220 Alt.
Centre	Worth Township			62	US 322 west – Philipsburg	Southbound exit and northbound entrance; southern end of US 322 concurrency
Centre	Patton Township			68	Grays Woods, Waddle	Access via Grays Woods Boulevard/Atherton Street
Centre	Patton Township			69	US 322 Bus. east (Atherton Street) / Valley Vista Drive – Park Forest	Signed for US 322 Bus./Atherton northbound, Valley Vista/Park Forest southbound; western terminus of US 322 Bus.
Centre	Patton Township			71	Toftrees, Woodycrest	Access via Waddle Road
Centre	College Township			73	US 322 east – State College, Lewistown	Northern end of US 322 concurrency
Centre	College Township			74	Innovation Park, Penn State University	Access via Park Avenue; access to Beaver Stadium and Bryce Jordan Center
Centre	Benner Township			76	Shiloh Road	
Centre	Benner Township			78	PA 150 – Bellefonte	Signed as exits 78A (south) and 78B (north)
Centre	Spring Township			80	Harrison Road	Northbound exit and southbound entrance
Centre	Spring Township			81	PA 26 south to PA 64 – Pleasant Gap	Southern end of PA 26 concurrency
Centre	Spring Township			83	PA 550 – Bellefonte, Zion	
Centre	Spring Township			Northern end of freeway section I-99 ends		
Centre	Spring Township			Southern end of limited-access section		
Centre	Spring Township			161	I-80 west (US 220 Alt. south) / PA 26 north – Dubois, Howard	Southern end of I-80 concurrency; northern end of PA 26 concurrency
Centre	Marion Township			163	To PA 26 – Jacksonville, Howard	Access via Walt Road
Clinton	Porter Township			173	PA 64 – Pleasant Gap, Mill Hall	
Clinton	Lamar Township			178	I-80 east – Bloomsburg	Northern end of I-80 concurrency; exit number not signed southbound
Clinton	Lamar Township				Mackeyville, Rote	Interchange opened 2016; access via Auction/Fairground Roads
Clinton	Lamar Township			107	PA 477 – Salona	
Clinton	Bald Eagle Township			109	PA 150 – Mill Hall, Flemington	
Clinton	Castanea Township			111	PA 120 west – Lock Haven, Castanea	Eastern terminus of PA 120
Clinton	Wayne Township			116	McElhattan, Woolrich	Access via McElhattan Drive
Clinton	Pine Creek Township			118	PA 150 south – Avis	Northern terminus of PA 150
Clinton	Pine Creek Township			120	PA 44 north – Pine Creek	Southern end of PA 44 concurrency
Lycoming	Jersey Shore				Thomas Street	
Lycoming	Piatt Township				PA 44 south (Main Street)	Northern end of PA 44 concurrency
Lycoming	Piatt Township			Northern end of limited-access section		
Lycoming	Piatt Township				PA 287 north	Southern terminus of PA 287
Lycoming	Woodward Township			Southern end of freeway section		
Lycoming	Woodward Township				Fourth Street	Northbound exit and southbound entrance
Lycoming	Williamsport				Reach Road Industrial Park	
Lycoming	Williamsport			29	I-99 north / US 15 north – Mansfield I-180 begins	Southern end of US 15 concurrency; current southern terminus of I-99; western terminus of I-180
Lycoming	Williamsport			28	Maynard Street	Access to Williamsport Hospital and Pennsylvania College of Technology
Lycoming	Williamsport			27B	Hepburn Street	Eastbound exit and westbound entrance
Lycoming	Williamsport			27A	US 15 south (Market Street) – Lewisburg	Northern end of US 15 concurrency; access to Little League Museum and Business District
Lycoming	Williamsport			26	Basin Street	Westbound exit and eastbound entrance
Lycoming	Loyalsock			25	Faxon	Sgts. Thomas Woodruff Sr. and Hamilton Woodruff Memorial Interchange; access via Northway Road
Lycoming	Loyalsock			23	Third Street / Warrensville Road – Warrensville, Montoursville	Signed as exits 23A (Third Street) and 23B (Warrensville) eastbound; access to Williamsport Regional Airport and Montoursville
Lycoming	Montoursville			21	PA 87 north (Loyalsock Avenue)	Southern terminus of PA 87; access to Williamsport Regional Airport
Lycoming	Montoursville			20	Fairfield Road	
Lycoming	Muncy Township			17	Lycoming Mall Road	
Lycoming	Muncy Township			15	I-180 east – Milton	Northern end of I-180 concurrency
Lycoming	Muncy Township			Northern end of freeway section		
Lycoming	Hughesville				PA 405 south (North Main Street) to PA 118 – Wilkes-Barre	Northern terminus of PA 405
Lycoming	Picture Rocks				PA 864 west (Laurel Run Road) – Farragut	Eastern terminus of PA 864
Sullivan	Davidson Township				PA 42 south – Bloomsburg	Southern end of PA 42 concurrency
Sullivan	Davidson Township				PA 42 north – Eagles Mere	Northern end of PA 42 concurrency; southern end of PA 42 Truck concurrency
Sullivan	Laporte				PA 42 south (Main Street) – Laporte, Eagles Mere	Northern end of PA 42 Truck concurrency; northern terminus of PA 42
Sullivan	Laporte Township				PA 154 north – Forksville, Canton	Southern terminus of PA 154
Sullivan	Cherry Township				PA 87 south – Forksville	Southern end of PA 87 concurrency
Sullivan	Dushore				PA 87 north (Main Street) to PA 487 – Mehoopany	Northern end of PA 87 concurrency
Bradford	Monroe				PA 414 west (Pennsylvania Avenue) – Canton	Eastern terminus of PA 414
Bradford	North Towanda Township				Patterson Boulevard – Towanda	Interchange
Bradford	North Towanda Township				US 6 – Troy, Towanda	Interchange
Bradford	Athens Township				PA 199 north – Athens	Southern terminus of PA 199; former routing of US 220
Bradford	Athens Township			Southern end of freeway section		
Bradford	Athens				Athens	Access via SR 1064
Bradford	Athens Township				Sayre, South Waverly	Access via SR 4020
Bradford	South Waverly			Northern end of freeway section		
Bradford	South Waverly				I-86 / NY 17 – Elmira, Binghamton	Northern terminus; exit 60 on I-86
1.000 mi = 1.609 km; 1.000 km = 0.621 mi: Concurrency terminus; Incomplete access

== See also ==
- Special routes of U.S. Route 220

U.S. Route 220
Previous state: Maryland	Pennsylvania	Next state: Terminus
