= Nealmont, Pennsylvania =

Unincorporated community in Pennsylvania, US

- Census-designated place
- Location within Pennsylvania Location within the United States
- Coordinates: 40°40′00″N 78°13′08″W
- Country: United States
- State: Pennsylvania
- County: Blair
- Township: Snyder

Area
  - Total: 0.015 sq mi (0.04 km^{2})
  - Land: 0.015 sq mi (0.04 km^{2})
  - Water: 0 sq mi (0.00 km^{2})
- Elevation: 902 ft (275 m)

Population (2020)
  - Total: 53
  - Density: 3,112.8/sq mi (1,201.84/km^{2})
- Time zone: UTC-5 (Eastern (EST))
  - Summer (DST): UTC-4 (EDT)
- ZIP Code: 16686 (Tyrone)
- Area codes: 814/582
- FIPS code: 42-52816
- GNIS feature ID: 2805531

Nealmont is an unincorporated community and census-designated place (CDP) in Blair County, Pennsylvania, United States. It was first listed as a CDP prior to the 2020 census.

The CDP is in northeastern Blair County, in the southeastern corner of Snyder Township. It sits on the north side of the Little Juniata River, where it emerges from its water gap between Bald Eagle Mountain to the north and Brush Mountain to the south. Pennsylvania Route 550 runs along the northern side of the CDP, leading west through the water gap 1 mile (1.6 km) to Tyrone and northeast 26 miles (42 km) to State College.

== Demographics ==
Historical population
Census	Pop.	Note	%±
2020	53		—
U.S. Decennial Census

== Education ==
The school district is the Tyrone Area School District.
