= Charlottsville, Pennsylvania =

Unincorporated community in Pennsylvania, US

- Census-designated place
- Location within Pennsylvania Location within the United States
- Coordinates: 40°38′44″N 78°16′32″W
- Country: United States
- State: Pennsylvania
- County: Blair
- Townships: Antis, Snyder

Area
  - Total: 0.073 sq mi (0.19 km^{2})
  - Land: 0.073 sq mi (0.19 km^{2})
  - Water: 0 sq mi (0.00 km^{2})
- Elevation: 932 ft (284 m)

Population (2020)
  - Total: 48
  - Density: 665.8/sq mi (257.07/km^{2})
- Time zone: UTC-5 (Eastern (EST))
  - Summer (DST): UTC-4 (EDT)
- ZIP Code: 16686 (Tyrone)
- Area codes: 814/582
- FIPS code: 42-12768
- GNIS feature ID: 2805474

Charlottsville is an unincorporated community and census-designated place (CDP) in Blair County, Pennsylvania, United States. It was first listed as a CDP prior to the 2020 census. The origin of the name "Charlottsville" is uncertain, but it was in use at least as early as 1859, although the name "Charlotteville" was used interchangeably.

== Geography ==
The CDP is in northern Blair County, mostly in the eastern part of Antis Township but extending northeastward into the southern part of Snyder Township. North Pleasant Valley Boulevard (old U.S. Route 220) forms the southeastern edge of the CDP, and the Pittsburgh Line of the Norfolk Southern Railway forms the northwestern edge. Interstate 99 passes southeast of the community, with access from Exit 45 at Pleasant Valley Boulevard. Tyrone is 3 miles (5 km) to the northeast, and Altoona is 11 miles (18 km) to the southwest.

Charlottsville is on the northwestern side of the valley of the Little Juniata River, which flows east to join the Juniata River near Petersburg.

== Demographics ==
Historical population
Census	Pop.	Note	%±
2020	48		—
U.S. Decennial Census

== Education ==
The school district for most of the area is Bellwood-Antis School District. For a portion, it is the Tyrone Area School District.
