= Gray, Blair County, Pennsylvania =

Unincorporated community in Pennsylvania, US

Gray, Pennsylvania
- Census-designated place
- Location within Pennsylvania Location within the United States
- Coordinates: 40°39′35″N 78°14′58″W
- Country: United States
- State: Pennsylvania
- County: Blair
- Township: Snyder

Area
  - Total: 0.15 sq mi (0.40 km^{2})
  - Land: 0.15 sq mi (0.40 km^{2})
  - Water: 0 sq mi (0.00 km^{2})
- Elevation: 994 ft (303 m)

Population (2020)
  - Total: 42
  - Density: 271.2/sq mi (104.73/km^{2})
- Time zone: UTC-5 (Eastern (EST))
  - Summer (DST): UTC-4 (EDT)
- ZIP Code: 16686 (Tyrone)
- Area codes: 814/582
- FIPS code: 42-30628
- GNIS feature ID: 2805508

Gray is an unincorporated community and census-designated place (CDP) in Blair County, Pennsylvania, United States. It was first listed as a CDP prior to the 2020 census.

The CDP is in northern Blair County, in the southern part of Snyder Township. It is on the southeastern side of the valley of the Little Juniata River, between Interstate 99 to the southeast and the Pittsburgh Line of the Norfolk Southern Railway to the northwest. The community is 1 mile (1.6 km) southwest of Tyrone, reached via Thomastown Road.

== Demographics ==
Historical population
| Census | Pop. | Note | %± |
|---|---|---|---|
| 2020 | 42 | | — |
U.S. Decennial Census

== Education ==
The school district is the Tyrone Area School District.
