= Snyder Township, Blair County, Pennsylvania =

Township in Pennsylvania, US

Coordinates: 40°42′30″N 78°15′59″W

- Township
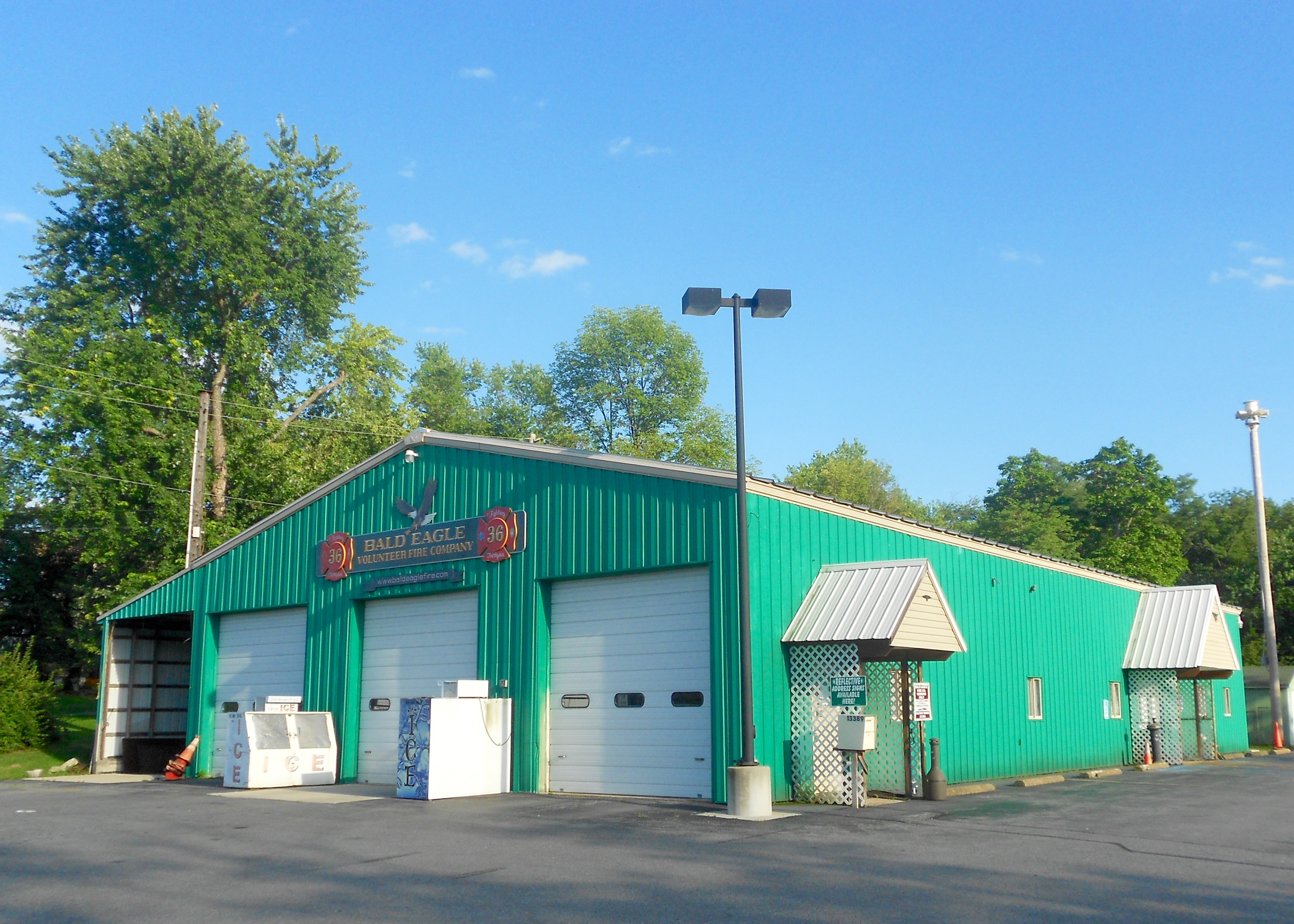
- Bald Eagle Volunteer Fire Company

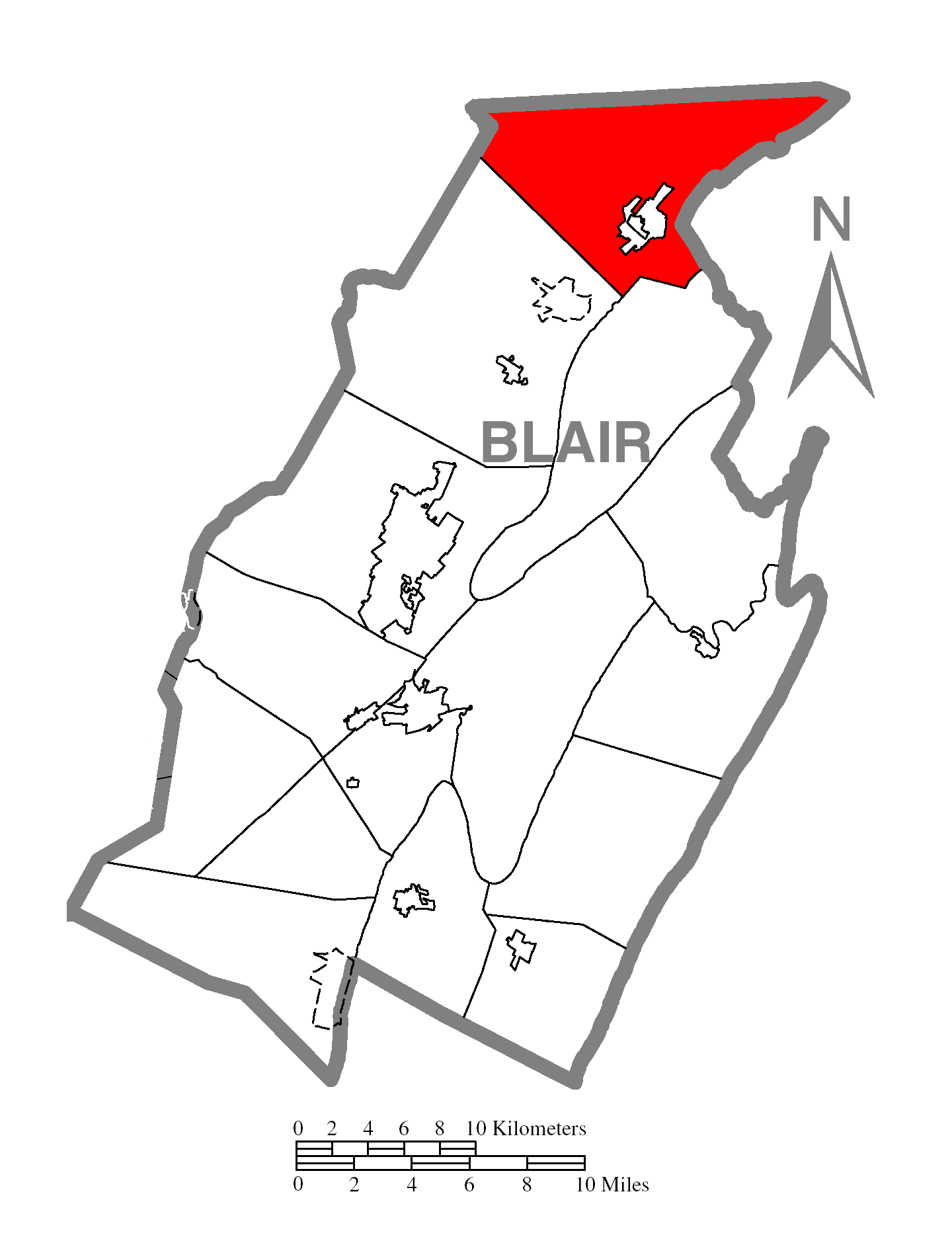
- Map of Blair County, Pennsylvania highlighting Snyder Township

- Map of Blair County, Pennsylvania
- Country: United States
- State: Pennsylvania
- County: Blair
- Settled: 1770
- Incorporated: 1840

Government
  - Type: Board of Supervisors

Area
  - Total: 45.15 sq mi (116.93 km^{2})
  - Land: 45.10 sq mi (116.80 km^{2})
  - Water: 0.050 sq mi (0.13 km^{2})

Population (2020)
  - Total: 3,345 ▼
  - Estimate (2022): 3,298
  - Density: 72.9/sq mi (28.13/km^{2})
- Time zone: UTC-5 (Eastern (EST))
  - Summer (DST): UTC-4 (EDT)
- Area code: 814
- FIPS code: 42-013-71624

Snyder Township is a township in Blair County, Pennsylvania, United States. It is part of the Altoona, PA Metropolitan Statistical Area. The population was 3,345 at the 2020 census.

== General information ==
- ZIP code: 16686
- Area code: 814
- Local telephone exchanges: 684, 686

== Geography ==
Snyder Township occupies the entire northern end of Blair County; Cambria County is to the west, Clearfield County is to the northwest, Centre County is to the north, and Huntingdon County is to the east. The township completely surrounds the borough of Tyrone. The unincorporated communities of Grazierville (bordering the south side of Tyrone), Gray, Nealmont, Tyrone Forge, Ironville, Northwood (bordering the northeastern side of Tyrone), Vail, Olivia, and Bald Eagle are in the township, and Charlottsville is on the southern border.

The crest of Bald Eagle Mountain forms most of the eastern boundary of the township. The Little Juniata River breaks through the mountain ridge at Tyrone; south of the river, the ridge is known as Brush Mountain. Interstate 99/U.S. Route 220 runs along the northwestern slope of the ridge, with access to the township from exits 45, 48, and 52.

According to the United States Census Bureau, the township has a total area of 45.1 square miles (116.9 km^{2}), of which 45.1 square miles (116.8 km^{2}) are land and 0.04 square miles (0.1 km^{2}), or 0.11%, are water.

== Demographics ==
Historical population
Census	Pop.	Note	%±
2010	3,364		—
2020	3,345		−0.6%
2022 (est.)	3,298		−1.4%
U.S. Decennial Census

As of the census of 2000, there were 3,358 people, 1,348 households, and 974 families residing in the township. The population density was 74.3 inhabitants per square mile (28.7/km^{2}). There were 1,430 housing units at an average density of 31.6 per square mile (12.2/km^{2}). The racial makeup of the township was 99.17% White, 0.18% African American, 0.03% Native American, 0.15% Asian, and 0.48% from two or more races. Hispanic or Latino of any race were 0.18% of the population.

There were 1,348 households, out of which 30.3% had children under the age of 18 living with them, 57.9% were married couples living together, 10.7% had a female householder with no husband present, and 27.7% were non-families. 24.6% of all households were made up of individuals, and 13.6% had someone living alone who was 65 years of age or older. The average household size was 2.47 and the average family size was 2.93.

In the township the population was spread out, with 23.6% under the age of 18, 6.5% from 18 to 24, 27.5% from 25 to 44, 24.5% from 45 to 64, and 17.9% who were 65 years of age or older. The median age was 41 years. For every 100 females, there were 95.6 males. For every 100 females age 18 and over, there were 91.4 males.

The median income for a household in the township was $33,818, and the median income for a family was $36,821. Males had a median income of $33,500 versus $21,000 for females. The per capita income for the township was $14,389. About 11.0% of families and 13.6% of the population were below the poverty line, including 18.2% of those under age 18 and 13.8% of those age 65 or over.

== Recreation ==
A portion of the Pennsylvania State Game Lands Number 60 is located along the northern border of the township and Pennsylvania State Game Lands Number 158 is located on the southwest end of the township.
