= Gray, Pennsylvania =

Gray is the name of several places in the U.S. state of Pennsylvania, including:

- Gray, Blair County, Pennsylvania
- Gray, Somerset County, Pennsylvania
