= Northwood, Pennsylvania =

Unincorporated community in Pennsylvania, US

Coordinates: 40°41′11″N 78°13′38″W

- Census-designated place
- Interactive map of Northwood, Pennsylvania
- Country: United States
- State: Pennsylvania
- County: Blair
- Township: Snyder

Area
  - Total: 0.53 sq mi (1.37 km^{2})
  - Land: 0.53 sq mi (1.37 km^{2})
  - Water: 0 sq mi (0.00 km^{2})

Population (2020)
  - Total: 269
  - Density: 509.1/sq mi (196.57/km^{2})
- Time zone: UTC-5 (Eastern (EST))
  - Summer (DST): UTC-4 (EDT)
- FIPS code: 42-55584
- GNIS feature ID: 2634249

Northwood is a census-designated place in Snyder Township, Blair County, Pennsylvania, United States. It is located near I-99 and is very close to the borough of Tyrone. As of the 2010 census, the population was 296 residents.

== Demographics ==
Historical population
Census	Pop.	Note	%±
2020	269		—
U.S. Decennial Census
