= Milan, Pennsylvania =

Unincorporated community in Pennsylvania, US

- Unincorporated community
- Location within Pennsylvania
- Coordinates: 41°54′27″N 76°31′24″W
- Country: United States
- State: Pennsylvania
- County: Bradford
- Elevation: 761 ft (232 m)
- Time zone: UTC-5 (Eastern (EST))
  - Summer (DST): UTC-4 (EDT)
- ZIP code: 18831
- Area codes: 272 & 570
- GNIS feature ID: 1204170

Milan is an unincorporated community in Bradford County, Pennsylvania, United States. The community is located along U.S. Route 220, 3.5 miles (5.6 km) south of Athens. Milan has a post office with ZIP code 18831.
