= Grazierville, Pennsylvania =

Unincorporated community in Pennsylvania, US

- Census-designated place
- Location within Pennsylvania Location within the United States
- Coordinates: 40°39′27″N 78°16′17″W
- Country: United States
- State: Pennsylvania
- County: Blair
- Township: Snyder

Area
  - Total: 2.78 km^{2} (1.07 sq mi)
  - Land: 2.78 km^{2} (1.07 sq mi)
  - Water: 0.00 km^{2} (0 sq mi)
- Elevation: 303 m (994 ft)

Population (2020)
  - Total: 670
  - Density: 241.13/km^{2} (624.5/sq mi)
- Time zone: UTC-5 (Eastern (EST))
  - Summer (DST): UTC-4 (EDT)
- ZIP code: 16686
- Area code: 814
- FIPS code: 42-30704
- GNIS feature ID: 2630012

Grazierville is a census-designated place in Snyder Township, Blair County, Pennsylvania, United States. It is located near I-99 and is approximately one mile to the south of the borough of Tyrone. As of the 2010 census, the population was 665 residents.

== Demographics ==
Historical population
Census	Pop.	Note	%±
2020	670		—
U.S. Decennial Census

== Education ==
The school district is the Tyrone Area School District.
