= Bald Eagle, Pennsylvania =

Unincorporated community in Pennsylvania, US

Bald Eagle
- Interactive map of Bald Eagle
- Coordinates: 40°42′54″N 78°11′33″W
- Country: United States
- State: Pennsylvania
- County: Blair
- Elevation: 1,047 ft (319 m)
- GNIS feature ID: 2805465

Bald Eagle is a Census-designated place in Snyder Township, Blair County, Pennsylvania, United States. As of the 2020 census, Bald Eagle had a population of 242. It is located in the Bald Eagle Valley at the foot of the Bald Eagle Mountain ridge, along the Big Fill Run near its confluence with the headwaters of the Bald Eagle Creek tributary of the Little Juniata River. Originally a stop on the Pennsylvania Railroad Tyrone Division, it is now exit 52 off Interstate 99, and was the former northern terminus of the unfinished highway. The Bald Eagle postal zip code is 16686 ( Tyrone, PA ).

== Education ==
The school district is the Tyrone Area School District.

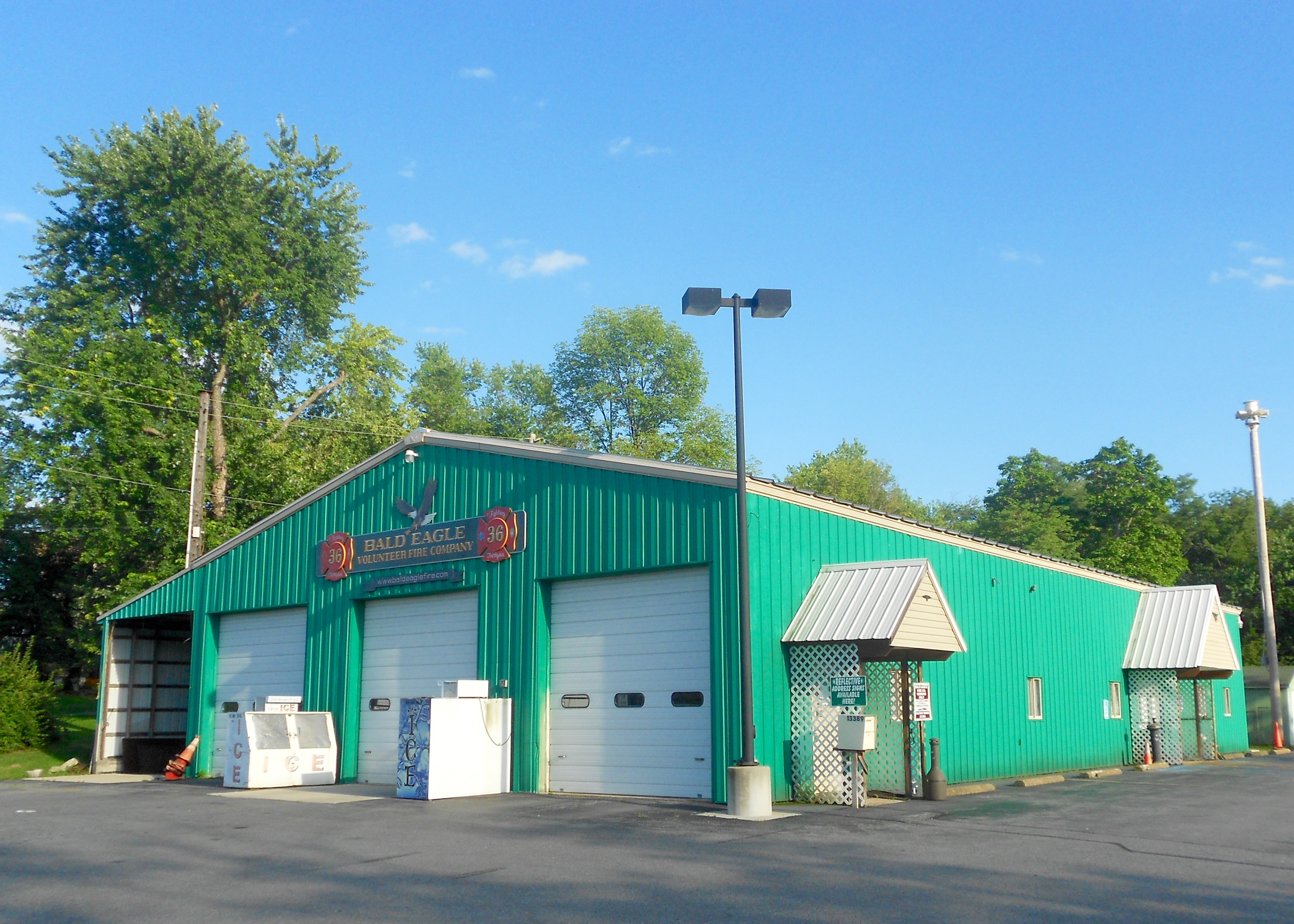
Volunteer Fire Company

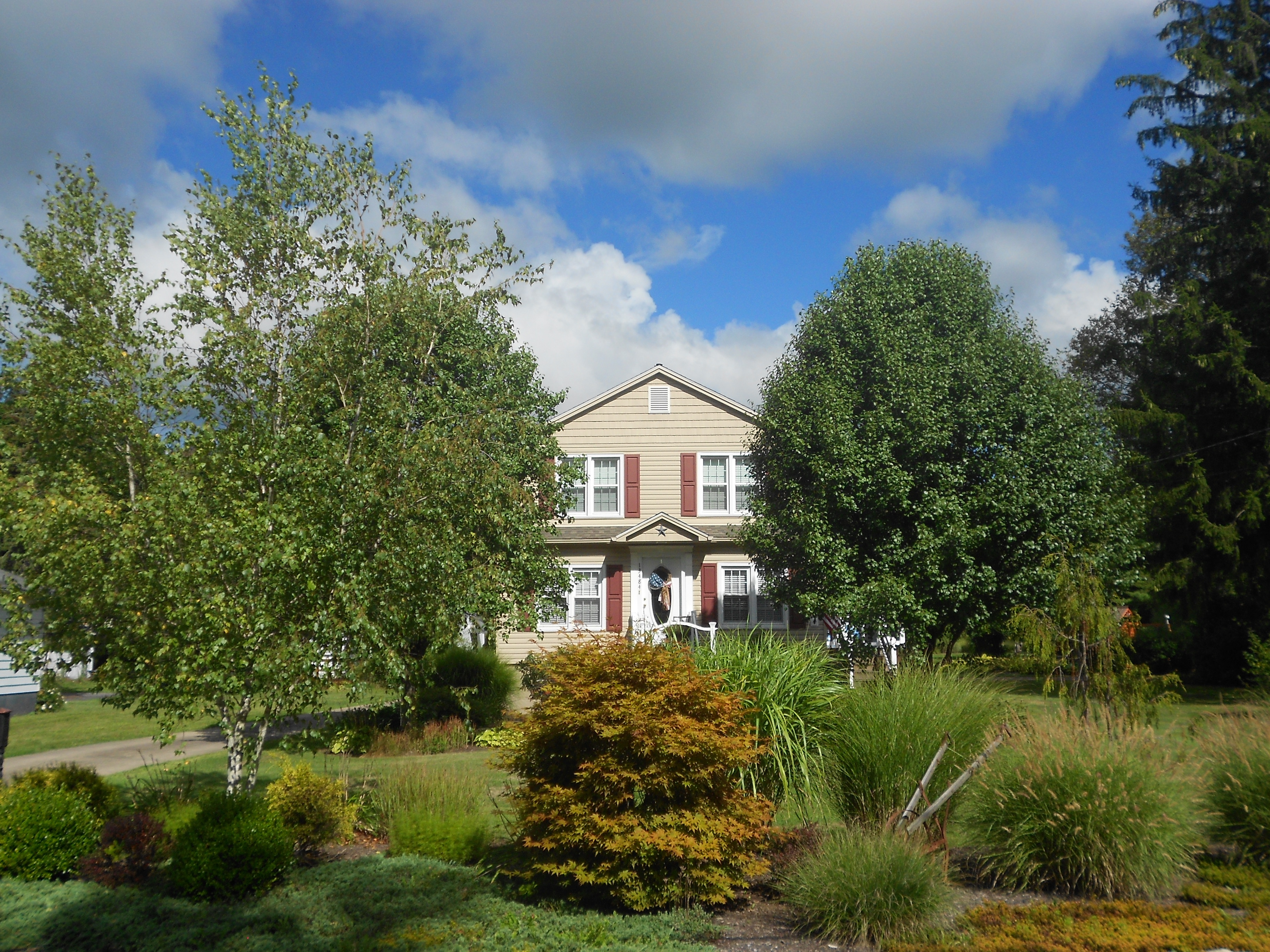
House in Bald Eagle
