= Castanea, Pennsylvania =

Unincorporated community in Pennsylvania, US

- Census-designated place
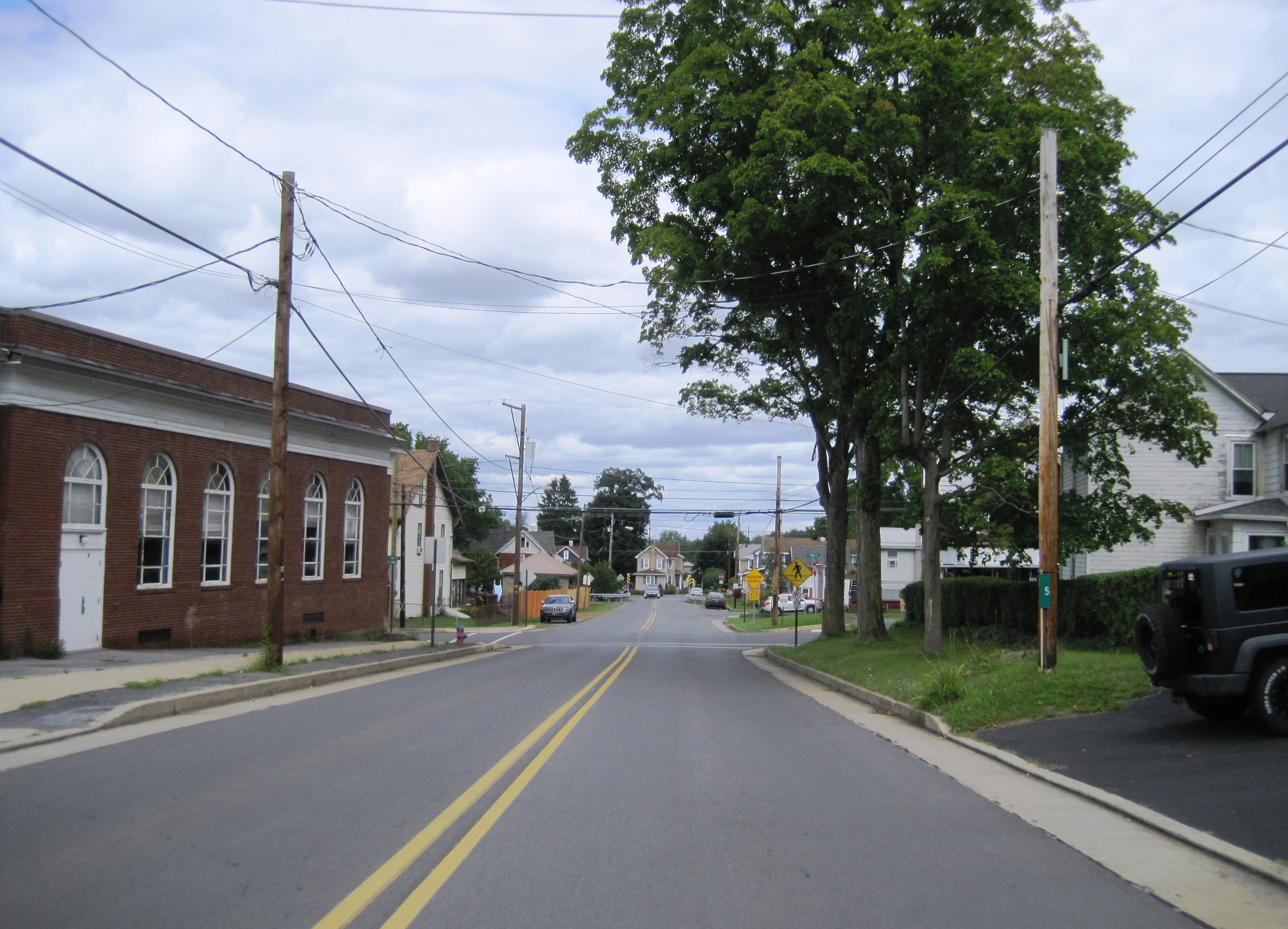
- West Brown Street in Castanea

- Location in Clinton County and the U.S. state of Pennsylvania.
- Coordinates: 41°7′22″N 77°25′57″W
- Country: United States
- State: Pennsylvania
- County: Clinton
- Township: Castanea

Area
  - Total: 1.39 sq mi (3.60 km^{2})
  - Land: 1.36 sq mi (3.53 km^{2})
  - Water: 0.027 sq mi (0.07 km^{2})
- Elevation: 600 ft (180 m)

Population (2020)
  - Total: 1,047
  - Density: 767.6/sq mi (296.36/km^{2})
- Time zone: UTC-5 (Eastern (EST))
  - Summer (DST): UTC-4 (EDT)
- ZIP code: 17726
- FIPS code: 42-11648
- GNIS feature ID: 1171315

Castanea is a census-designated place (CDP) in Castanea Township, Pennsylvania, United States. The population was 1,125 at the 2010 census.

== Geography ==
Castanea is located in southeastern Clinton County at 41°7′22″N 77°25′57″W (41.122882, -77.432578). It occupies most of the western side of Castanea Township. The community occupies an area bordered by Bald Eagle Creek to the north and Bald Eagle Mountain to the south. Jarrett Avenue crosses Bald Eagle Creek, connecting the center of town with U.S. Route 220 and the city of Lock Haven to the north.

According to the United States Census Bureau, the Castanea CDP has a total area of 1.39 square miles (3.60 km^{2}), of which 1.36 square miles (3.53 km^{2}) is land and 0.03 square miles (0.07 km^{2}), or 1.94%, is water.

== Demographics ==
Historical population
Census	Pop.	Note	%±
2020	1,047		—
U.S. Decennial Census

As of the census of 2000, there were 1,189 people, 497 households, and 357 families residing in the CDP, figures representing about 96% of the population of the Township. There are only 44 people, 19 households, and 15 families located outside of the CDP but within the township.

The population density was 887.4 inhabitants per square mile (342.6/km^{2}). There were 512 housing units at an average density of 382.1 per square mile (147.5/km^{2}). The racial makeup of the CDP was 98.74% White, 0.67% Asian, 0.08% African American, 0.17% from other races, and 0.34% from two or more races. Hispanic or Latino of any race were 0.25% of the population.

There were 497 households, out of which 26.2% had children under the age of 18 living with them, 61.8% were married couples living together, 6.6% had a female householder with no husband present, and 28.0% were non-families. 21.5% of all households were made up of individuals, and 9.9% had someone living alone who was 65 years of age or older. The average household size was 2.39 and the average family size was 2.77.

In the CDP, the population was spread out, with 20.2% under the age of 18, 8.0% from 18 to 24, 28.8% from 25 to 44, 25.5% from 45 to 64, and 17.5% who were 65 years of age or older. The median age was 41 years. For every 100 females, there were 93.3 males. For every 100 females age 18 and over, there were 90.9 males.

The median income for a household in the CDP was $33,519, and the median income for a family was $35,966. Males had a median income of $28,864 versus $20,529 for females. The per capita income for the CDP was $15,133. About 6.7% of families and 9.1% of the population were below the poverty line, including 7.7% of those under age 18 and 6.4% of those age 65 or over.

== Places ==
Castanea includes Harvey's Run Park on T366 Street. The area also features a train station restaurant on Logan Avenue, adjacent to a combined train station museum and hotel on Bridge Street. Additionally, the Bald Eagle Valley Trail runs near the museum and hotel.
