= Birmingham, Huntingdon County, Pennsylvania =

Borough in Pennsylvania, US

Birmingham, Pennsylvania
- Borough
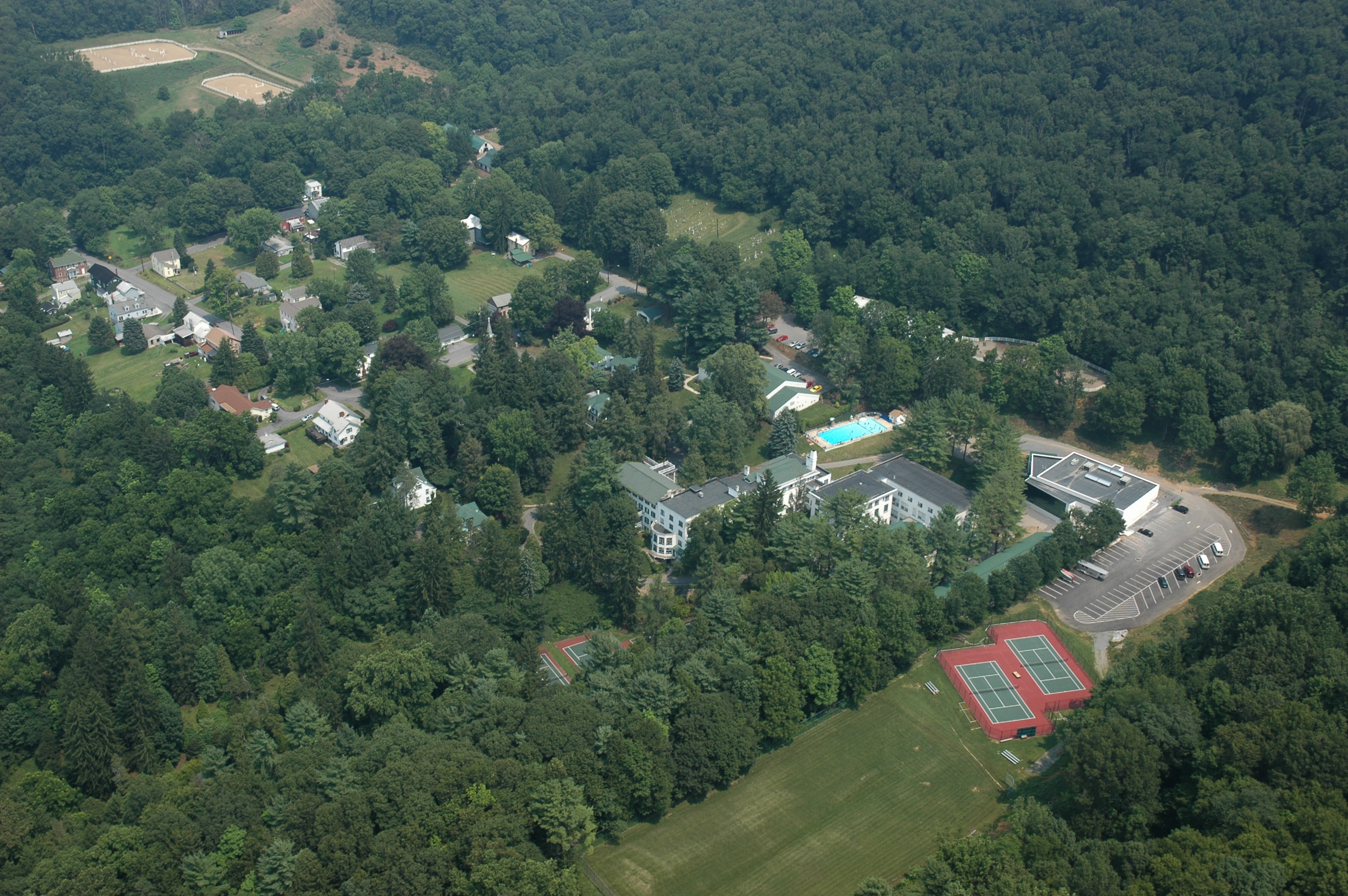
- Grier School and the Borough of Birmingham

- Location of Birmingham in Huntingdon County, Pennsylvania.

- Location within Pennsylvania Location within the United States
- Coordinates: 40°38′50″N 78°11′44″W
- Country: United States
- State: Pennsylvania
- County: Huntingdon
- Settled: 1797
- Incorporated: 1828

Government
  - Type: Borough Council
  - Mayor: David Pryor (R)

Area
  - Total: 0.062 sq mi (0.16 km^{2})
  - Land: 0.062 sq mi (0.16 km^{2})
  - Water: 0 sq mi (0.00 km^{2})
- Elevation: 965 ft (294 m)

Population (2020)
  - Total: 89
  - Density: 1,417.0/sq mi (547.09/km^{2})
- Time zone: UTC-5 (Eastern (EST))
  - Summer (DST): UTC-4 (EDT)
- Zip code: 16686
- Area code: 814
- FIPS code: 42-06560
- GNIS feature ID: 1215265
- School District: Tyrone Area School District
- Local phone exchanges: 682, 684, 686

Birmingham is a borough in Huntingdon County, Pennsylvania, United States. The population was 90 at the 2020 census.

== History ==
Birmingham is the site of the Birmingham Window, a geologic structure created by a Paleozoic thrust fault.

Birmingham's early settler, John Cadwallader, settled on a hill above the Little Juniata River and made plans to establish a large city. In the first several decades of the 19th century, the village grew quickly as a hub for commerce being carried on the Little Juniata River and on the nearby Pennsylvania Canal. By 1850, the Pennsylvania Railroad had passed through the valley. The development of the railroad diminished the importance of Birmingham as a trading hub since the railroad's nearby hubs in Tyrone and Altoona grew quickly on land that was better suited for development.

In 1853, the Mountain Female Seminary opened in Birmingham as a boarding school for girls. In its earliest years, the school benefited from the ease of transportation afforded by the passage of the Pennsylvania railroad through Birmingham. Currently, the school still operates as Grier School, a boarding school for girls.

The East Coast earthquake on August 23, 2011, caused a rockslide along Route 453 in Birmingham.

== Geography ==
According to the United States Census Bureau, the borough has a total area of 0.1 square miles (0.26 km^{2}), all land.

== Demographics ==
Historical population
Census	Pop.	Note	%±
1820	43		—
1840	235		—
1850	266		13.2%
1860	221		−16.9%
1870	263		19.0%
1880	231		−12.2%
1890	225		−2.6%
1900	240		6.7%
1910	196		−18.3%
1920	197		0.5%
1930	191		−3.0%
1940	198		3.7%
1950	178		−10.1%
1960	136		−23.6%
1970	115		−15.4%
1980	121		5.2%
1990	109		−9.9%
2000	91		−16.5%
2010	90		−1.1%
2020	90		0.0%
2021 (est.)	89		−1.1%

As of the census of 2010, there were 90 people and 42 households within the borough. The population density was 900.0 inhabitants per square mile (347.5/km^{2}). There were 45 housing units at an average density of 450.0 per square mile (173.7/km^{2}). The racial makeup of the borough was 97.78% White, 1.11% Asian, 1.11% from other races. Hispanic or Latino of any race made up 6.67% of the population.

There were 39 households, out of which 19.0% had children under the age of 18 living with them, 51.3% were married couples living together, 10.3% had a female householder with no husband present, and 35.9% were non-families. 33.3% of all households were made up of individuals, and 17.9% had someone living alone who was 65 years of age or older. The average household size was 2.33 and the average family size was 2.92.

In the borough the population was spread out, with 15.6% under the age of 18, 1.1% from 18 to 19, 4.4% from 20 to 24, 12.2% from 25 to 34, 28.9% from 35 to 49, 17.8% from 50 to 64, and 20.0% who were 65 years of age or older. The median age was 40 years. Males made up 48.89% of the population, and females make up 51.11%.

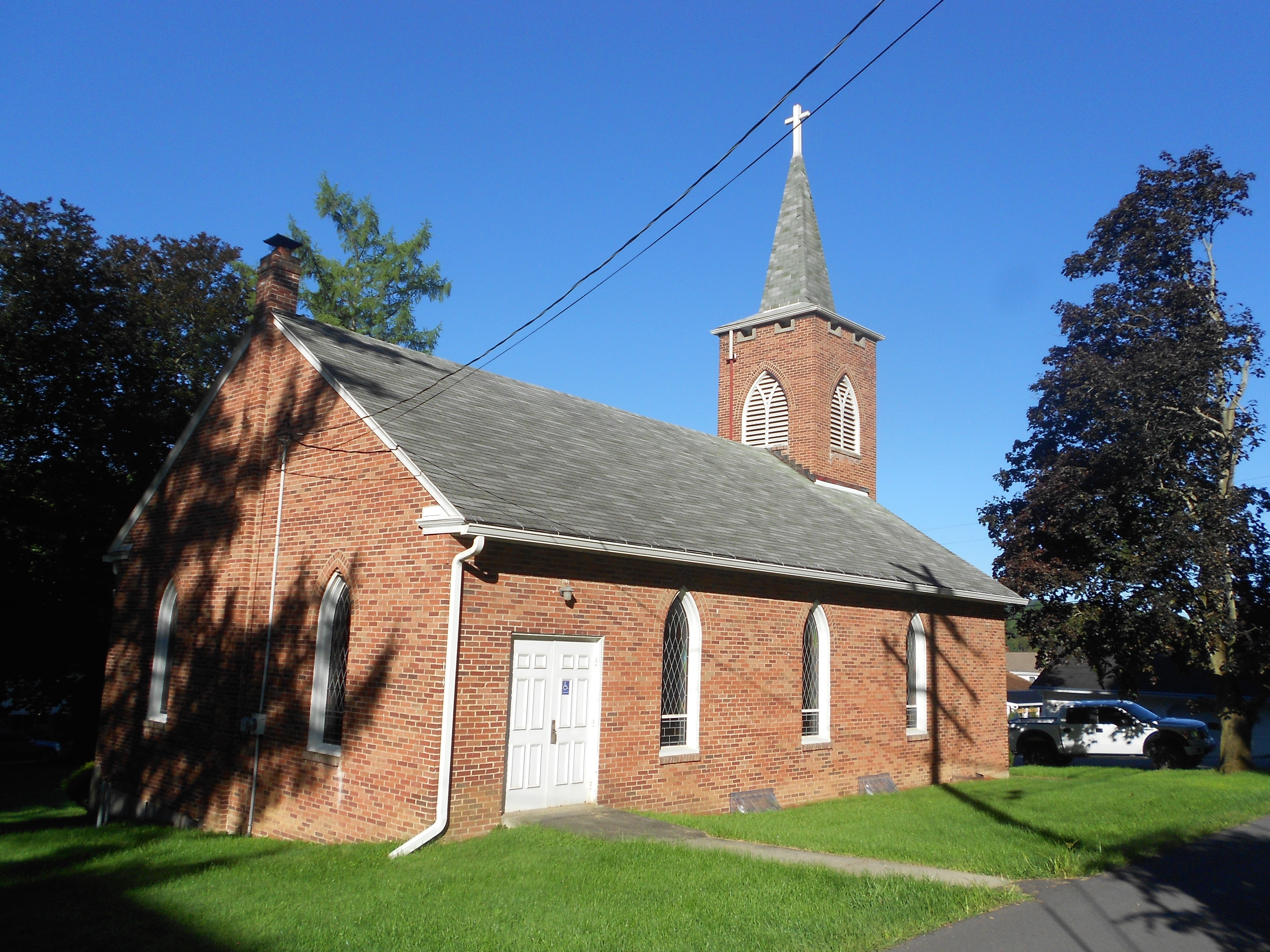
Presbyterian Church

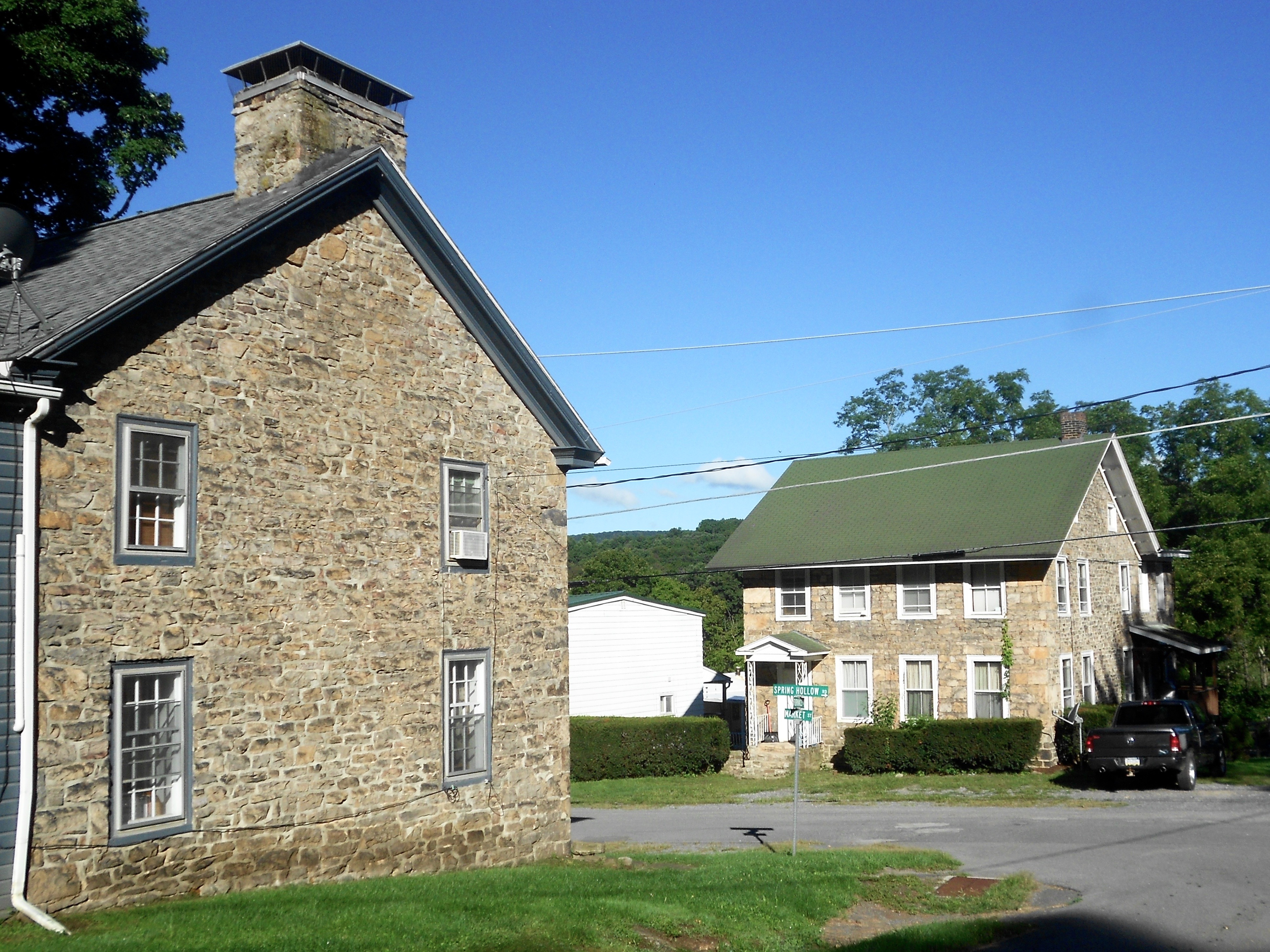
Two stone houses
