= Castanea delle Furie =

Castanea delle Furie Καστανέα ντελλε Φούριε (Greek)
- Frazione
- Location of Castanea delle Furie in Italy
- Coordinates: 38°15′52″N 15°31′17″E
- Country: Italy
- Region: Sicily
- Province: Messina
- Comune: Messina
- Elevation: 400 m (1,300 ft)

Population (2001)
  - Total: 2,103
- Demonym: Castanoti
- Time zone: UTC+1 (CET)
  - Summer (DST): UTC+2 (CEST)
- Dialing code: 090
- Patron saint: John the Baptist

Castanea delle Furie is a frazione of the comune of Messina in the Province of Messina, Sicily, southern Italy. It stands at an elevation of 400 m (1,300 ft) above sea level. At the time of the Istat census of 2001 it had 2,103 inhabitants.
