= Castanea Township, Pennsylvania =

Township in Pennsylvania, US

Coordinates: 41°07′27″N 77°25′53″W

- Township
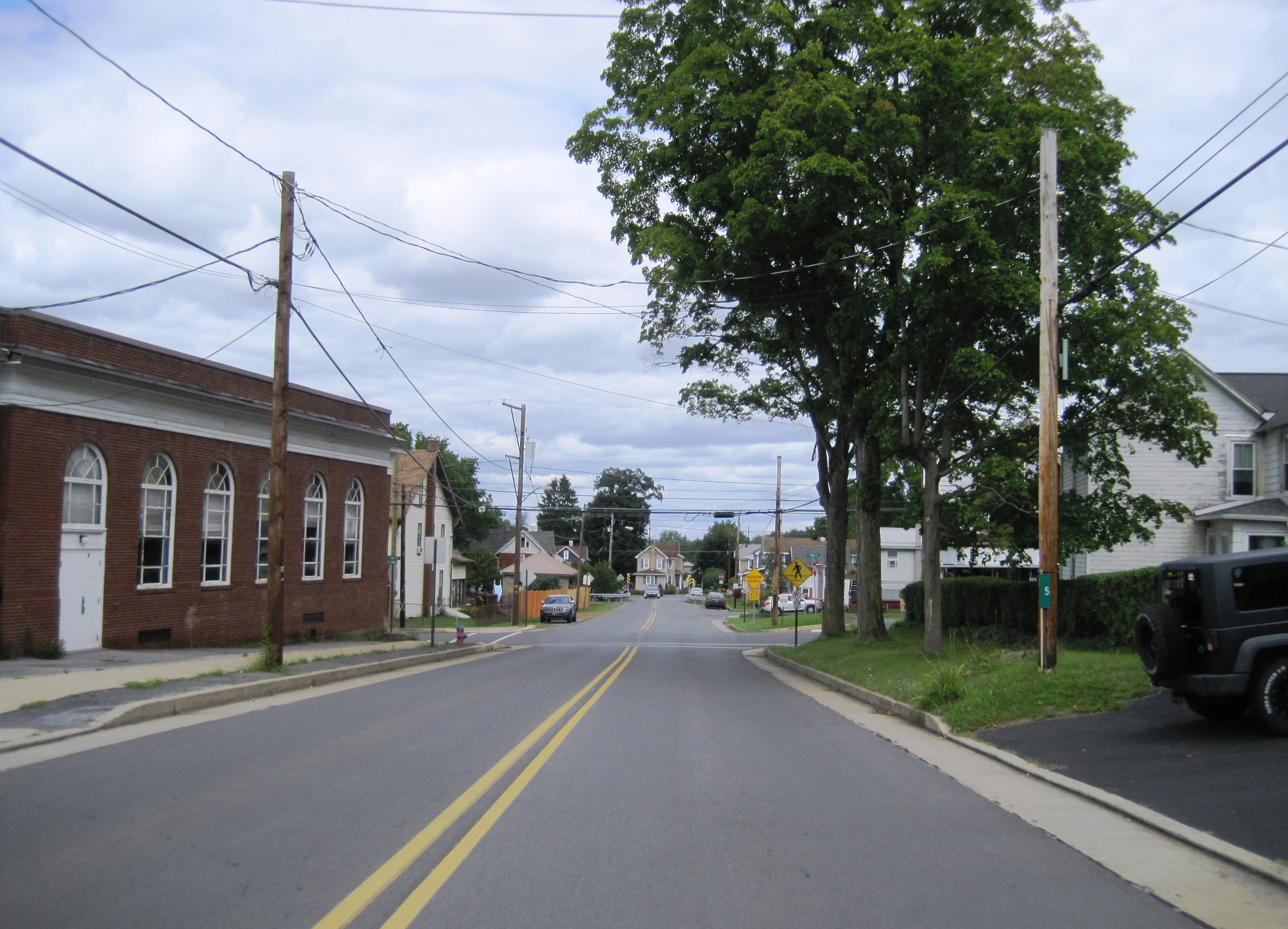
- West Brown Street in the village of Castanea within the township

- Location in Clinton County and the state of Pennsylvania.
- Country: United States
- State: Pennsylvania
- County: Clinton
- Incorporated: 1877

Area
  - Total: 5.86 sq mi (15.18 km^{2})
  - Land: 5.51 sq mi (14.28 km^{2})
  - Water: 0.35 sq mi (0.90 km^{2})

Population (2020)
  - Total: 1,095 ▼
  - Estimate (2021): 1,093
  - Density: 214.3/sq mi (82.73/km^{2})
- FIPS code: 42-035-11640
- Website: www.castaneatownshippa.gov

Castanea Township is a township in Clinton County, Pennsylvania, United States. The population was 1,095 at the 2020 census.

== Geography ==
According to the United States Census Bureau, the township has a total area of 5.9 square miles (15.2 km^{2}), of which 5.5 square miles (14.3 km^{2}) is land and 0.35 square miles (0.9 km^{2}), or 5.94%, is water. It is bordered to the north by the city of Lock Haven, the Clinton County seat.

== Community ==
- Castanea

== Demographics ==
Historical population
Census	Pop.	Note	%±
1980	1,204		—
1990	1,188		−1.3%
2000	1,233		3.8%
2010	1,185		−3.9%
2020	1,095		−7.6%
2021 (est.)	1,093		−0.2%

As of the census of 2000, there were 1,233 people, 516 households, and 372 families residing in the township. The population density was 221.6 inhabitants per square mile (85.6/km^{2}). There were 531 housing units at an average density of 95.4 per square mile (36.8/km^{2}). The racial makeup of the township was 98.78% White, 0.08% African American, 0.65% Asian, 0.16% from other races, and 0.32% from two or more races. Hispanic or Latino of any race were 0.24% of the population.

There were 516 households, out of which 26.0% had children under the age of 18 living with them, 62.0% were married couples living together, 6.6% had a female householder with no husband present, and 27.9% were non-families. 21.3% of all households were made up of individuals, and 9.7% had someone living alone who was 65 years of age or older. The average household size was 2.39 and the average family size was 2.77.

In the township the population was spread out, with 20.0% under the age of 18, 7.9% from 18 to 24, 29.0% from 25 to 44, 25.8% from 45 to 64, and 17.3% who were 65 years of age or older. The median age was 41 years. For every 100 females, there were 93.6 males. For every 100 females age 18 and over, there were 91.3 males.

The median income for a household in the township was $33,657, and the median income for a family was $36,250. Males had a median income of $29,018 versus $20,721 for females. The per capita income for the township was $15,448. About 6.5% of families and 8.8% of the population were below the poverty line, including 7.5% of those under age 18 and 6.3% of those age 65 or over.
