= Bald Eagle Creek (Little Juniata River tributary) =

Watercourse in Pennsylvania, US

Coordinates: 40.671°N 78.237°W

Bald Eagle Creek is a 9.4-mile-long (15.1 km) tributary of the Little Juniata River in Blair County, Pennsylvania, in the United States. It runs southwest through the Bald Eagle Valley at the foot of the Bald Eagle Mountain ridge to Tyrone.

The longer Bald Eagle Creek runs north in the valley from the same headlands near the Blair County/Centre County line, terminating in the West Branch Susquehanna River near Lock Haven.

The main line of the Nittany and Bald Eagle Railroad short line runs along the full length of both Bald Eagle creeks.

== See also ==
- List of rivers of Pennsylvania
- List of river's in the United States
