= Tyrone Area School District =

School district in Pennsylvania

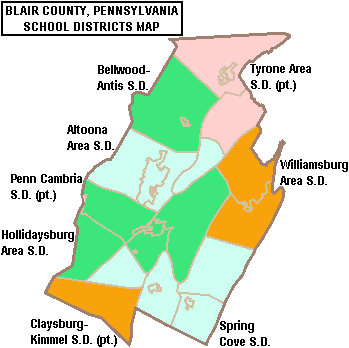

Address
- 701 Clay Avenue Central Pennsylvania Tyrone, Blair County, Centre County and Huntingdon Counties, Pennsylvania, 16686-1807; United States

District information
- Type: Public

Students and staff
- District mascot: Golden Eagle
- Colors: Orange and Black

Other information
- Website: http://tyrone.k12.pa.us/

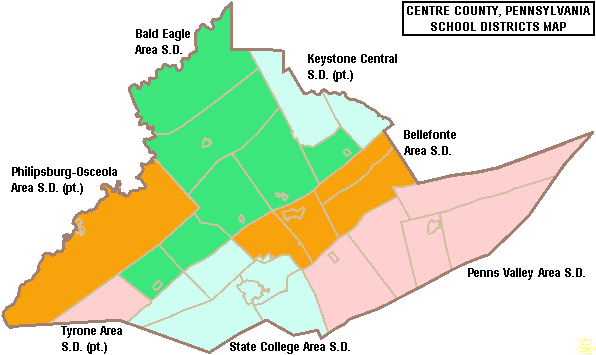
Map of Centre County, Pennsylvania School Districts showing a part of Tyrone Area School District

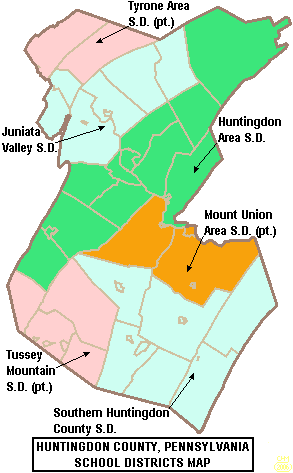
Map of Huntingdon County, Pennsylvania School Districts showing a part of Tyrone Area School District

The Tyrone Area School District is a public school district with coverage areas in Blair County, Pennsylvania, Huntingdon County, Pennsylvania and Taylor Township in Centre County, Pennsylvania. It serves the borough of Tyrone and the townships of Tyrone and Snyder in Blair County, as well as the borough of Birmingham and the townships of Warriors Mark and Franklin in Huntingdon County. The district encompasses approximately 167 square miles. Based on 2010 local census data, it serves a resident population of 12,581.

== Schools ==
Tyrone Area High School

Location
- 1001 Clay Avenue; Tyrone, (Blair County), Pennsylvania 16686; United States; 40.674002°N 78.249656°W

Information
- Type: Public high school
- Principal: Chad Packer
- Staff: 35.86 (FTE)
- Enrollment: 511 (2023-24)
- Student to teacher ratio: 14.25
- Colors: Black and orange
- Nickname: Golden Eagles
- Website: Tyrone Area High School

- Tyrone Area Elementary School – (Grades Pre-K-4)
  601 Clay Ave.
  Tyrone, Pennsylvania 16686
- Tyrone Area Middle School – (Grades 5–8)
  1001 Clay Ave.
  Tyrone, Pennsylvania 16686
- Tyrone Area High School – (Grades 9–12)
  1001 Clay Ave.
  Tyrone, Pennsylvania 16686

== Extracurriculars ==
The district offers a variety of clubs, activities and sports.

=== Athletics ===
Boys

- Baseball - AAA
- Basketball- AAAA
- Cross Country - AA
- Football - AAA
- Golf -AA
- Soccer - AA with Bellwood-Antis School District
- Swimming and Diving - Class AA
- Tennis - AA
- Track and Field
- Wrestling - AAA

Girls

- Basketball - AAA
- Cross Country - AA
- Soccer (Fall) - A with Bellwood-Antis School District
- Swimming and Diving - Class AA
- Softball - AAA
- Tennis - AAA
- Track and Field - AA
- Volleyball - AA

- Bocce

Junior High School Sports

Boys

- Basketball
- Football
- Track and Field
- Wrestling

Girls

- Basketball
- Softball
- Track and Field

- According to PIAA directory July 2012
