= Little Juniata River =

River in Pennsylvania, United States

Coordinates: 40.56146°N 78.06723°W

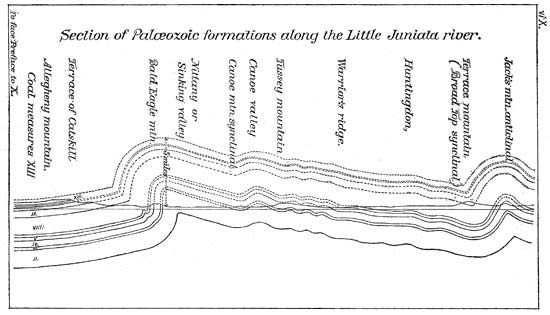
Geologic cross section along the Little Juniata River

The Little Juniata River, sometimes called the "Little J", is a 32.1-mile-long (51.7 km) tributary of the Juniata River in the Susquehanna River watershed of Pennsylvania. It is formed at Altoona by the confluence of several short streams. It flows northeast in the Logan Valley at the foot of Brush Mountain.

At Tyrone, the river receives the southern Bald Eagle Creek, then turns abruptly southeast, passing through a water gap between the Brush and Bald Eagle Mountain ridges and enters Sinking Valley where it receives Sinking Run. Approximately 6 miles (10 km) northwest of Huntingdon, near Petersburg, it joins the Frankstown Branch Juniata River, forming the Juniata River.

In colonial America, the river was used to float freight downriver on boats called "arcs". Shipments were placed on board in Birmingham, just east of Tyrone, to await water high enough to clear the rocky stream bed. Thus the Little Juniata was (and still is) listed as a commercially "navigable" river.

The Little Juniata River is a good spot for fly fishing; it holds a Class A population of wild brown trout and requires no stocking.

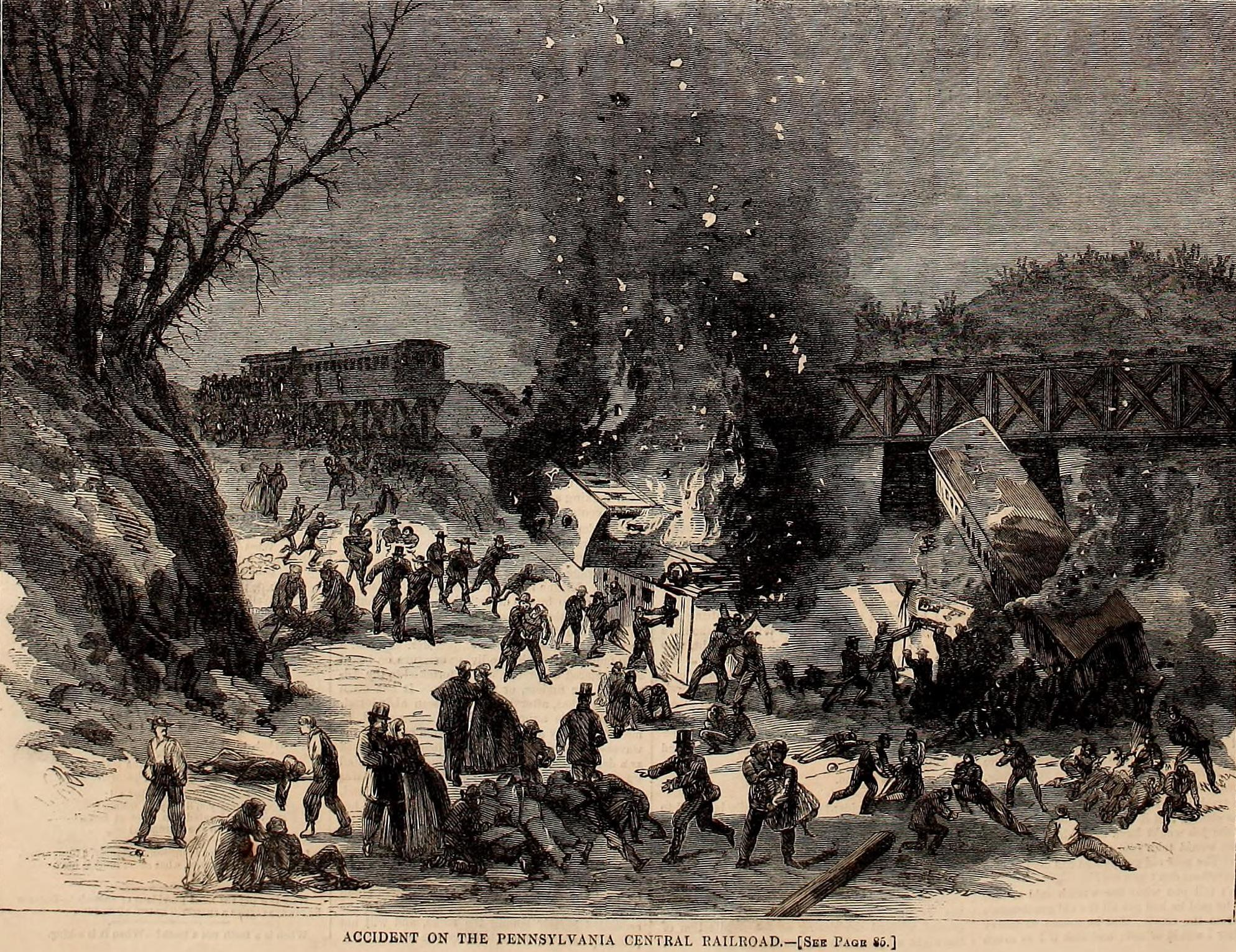
Accident on the Pennsylvania Central Railroad, on the river near Birmingham, Huntingdon County; Harper's Weekly, January 14, 1864

== See also ==
- List of rivers of Pennsylvania
