= Tyrone, Pennsylvania =

Borough in Pennsylvania, US

- Borough
- Aerial view of Tyrone (2026)

- Flag Seal
- Motto: Where quality of life comes first
- Location of Tyrone in Blair County, Pennsylvania.

- Location within Pennsylvania
- Coordinates: 40°40′29″N 78°14′29″W
- Country: United States
- State: Pennsylvania
- County: Blair
- Settled: 1851
- Incorporated: 1857

Government
  - Type: Borough Council
  - Mayor: John Harlow

Area
  - Total: 2.03 sq mi (5.27 km^{2})
  - Land: 2.03 sq mi (5.27 km^{2})
  - Water: 0 sq mi (0.00 km^{2})
- Elevation: 1,001 ft (305 m)

Population (2020)
  - Total: 5,480
  - Density: 2,692.7/sq mi (1,039.65/km^{2})
- Time zone: UTC-5 (Eastern (EST))
  - Summer (DST): UTC-4 (EDT)
- Zip code: 16686
- Area code: 814
- FIPS code: 42-78168
- GNIS feature ID: 1214946
- Website: Tyrone Borough website

Tyrone is a borough in Blair County, Pennsylvania, United States, located 15 miles (24 km) northeast of Altoona, on the Little Juniata River. Tyrone was of considerable commercial importance in the twentieth century. It was an outlet for the Clearfield coal fields and was noted for manufacturing paper products. There were planing mills and chemical and candy factories. In 1900, 5,847 people lived here; in 1910, 7,176; and in 1940, 8,845 people resided here. As of the 2020 census, Tyrone had a population of 5,480. It is part of the Altoona, PA Metropolitan Statistical Area. It was named after County Tyrone in Ireland.

Located along the main lines of the Norfolk Southern and Nittany and Bald Eagle railroads, and U.S. Route 220, Pennsylvania Route 453, and Interstate 99 highways, Tyrone was at one time known as "The Hub of the Highways". In those days, four railroads [Pennsylvania, Tyrone and Clearfield, Tyrone and Lock Haven, Lewisburg, and Tyrone] and three main highways [US-220, PA-350, PA-453] converged there.

== History ==
The Tyrone Borough Historic District was added to the National Register of Historic Places in 1993.

=== Circus Train Derailment ===
On May 30, 1893, a train carrying employees and animals belonging to the Walter L. Main Circus derailed at an embankment resulting in the deaths of five circus employees, plus many animal casualties. Many unharmed animals escaped from the wreck and were reported across the countryside for months after the wreck, most notably, a woman who escaped a Bengal tiger, but lost her cow in the attack. A memorial now stands at the site.

=== Tornado ===
On June 2, 1998, an F1 tornado moved southeast along Pennsylvania Route 453 northwest of Tyrone. Significant tree damage was noted in several locations along a four-mile path, beginning approximately five miles northwest of Tyrone. No significant damage was reported in Tyrone, although eyewitnesses reported seeing clouds rotating as they crossed the city. This tornado was part of the 1998 Eastern Tornado Outbreak.

== Industry ==
The largest employers in Tyrone are the Tyrone Area School District and the Tyrone Hospital. Tyrone is also the home to American Eagle Paper Mills and Gardners Candies. Founded in 1897, Gardners Candies has ten retail stores in the area and is known regionally for its peanut butter meltaway candy.

== Geography ==
According to the United States Census Bureau, the borough has a total area of 2.0 square miles (5.2 km^{2}), all land.

Tyrone is situated in the Bald Eagle Valley at the base of Bald Eagle Mountain along Bald Eagle Creek at the Little Juniata River water gap.

== Demographics ==
Historical population
Census	Pop.	Note	%±
1860	741		—
1870	1,840		148.3%
1880	2,678		45.5%
1890	4,705		75.7%
1900	5,847		24.3%
1910	7,176		22.7%
1920	9,084		26.6%
1930	9,042		−0.5%
1940	8,845		−2.2%
1950	8,214		−7.1%
1960	7,792		−5.1%
1970	7,072		−9.2%
1980	6,346		−10.3%
1990	5,743		−9.5%
2000	5,528		−3.7%
2010	5,477		−0.9%
2020	5,480		0.1%
U.S. Decennial Census

As of the census of 2010, there were 5,477 people, 2,275 households, and 1,422 families residing in the borough. The population density was 2,711.4 inhabitants per square mile (1,046.9/km^{2}). There were 2,472 housing units at an average density of 1,223.8 per square mile (472.5/km^{2}). The racial makeup of the borough was 97.3% White, 0.7% Black or African American, 0.3% Native American, 0.3% Asian, 0.2% from other races, and 1.2% from two or more races. Hispanic or Latino of any race were 1.0% of the population.

There were 2,275 households, out of which 30.9% had children under the age of 18 living with them, 43.0% were married couples living together, 4.8% had a male householder with no wife present, 14.7% had a female householder with no husband present, and 37.5% were non-families. 33.0% of all households were made up of individuals, and 14.8% had someone who was 65 years or older living alone. The average household size was 2.34, and the average family size was 2.93.

In the borough, the population was spread out, with 22.6% under 18, 8.2% from 18 to 24, 25.6% from 25 to 44, 25.3% from 45 to 64, and 18.3% who were 65 years of age or older. The median age was 40 years. For every 100 females, there were 88.8 males. For every 100 females aged 18 and over, there were 85.8 males.

The median income for a household in the borough was $34,850, and the median income for a family was $43,851. The per capita income for the borough was $18,664. About 10.7% of families and 14.0% of the population were below the poverty line, including 23.0% of those under age 18 and 10.9% of those aged 65 or over.

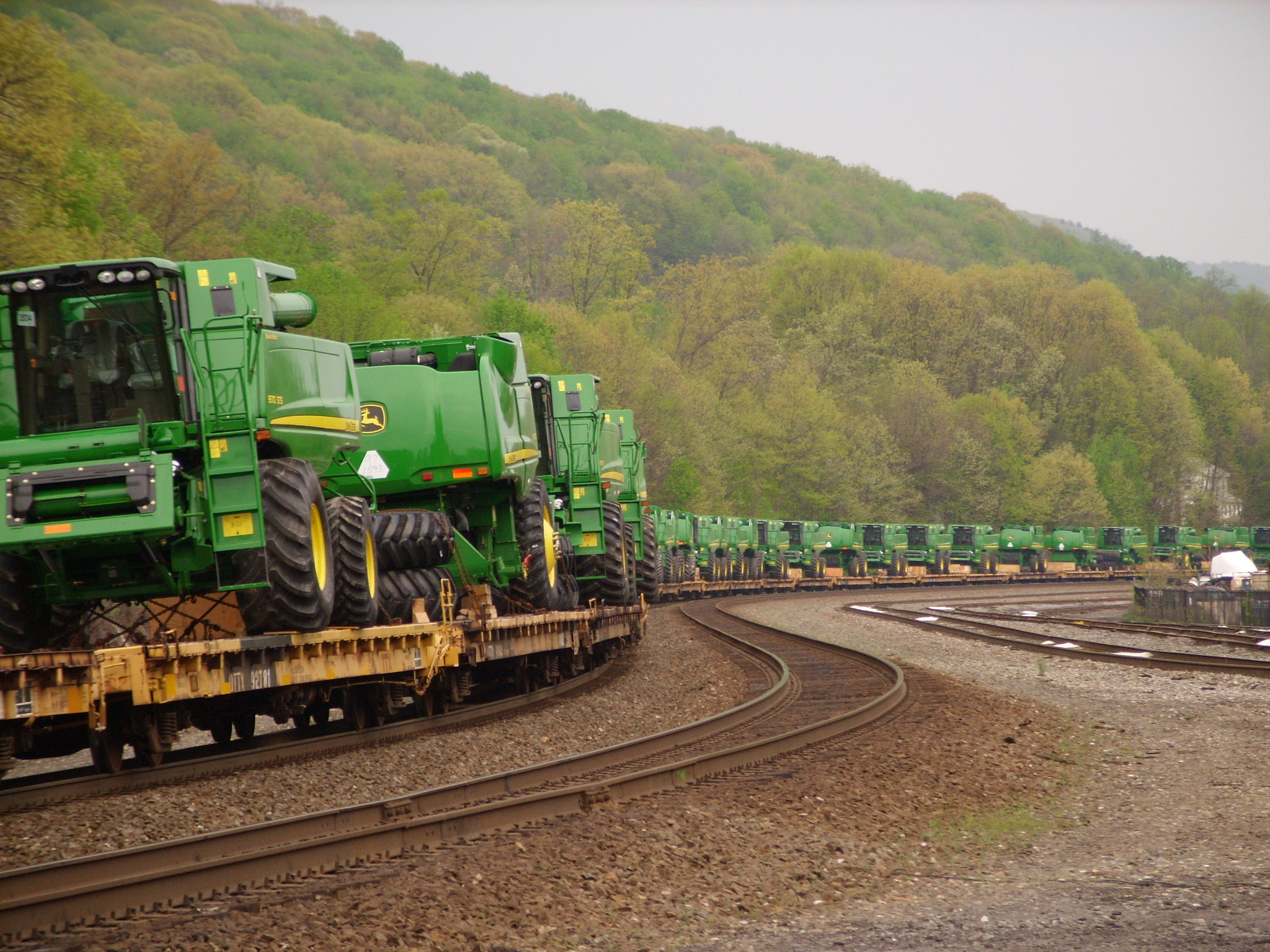
John Deere Combine harvesters being transported by railway on flatcars in Tyrone, Pennsylvania.

== Transportation ==
Amtrak’s Pennsylvanian stops at the Tyrone station, which has one daily train in each direction. Greyhound buses going between Pittsburgh and Philadelphia also make a stop in Tyrone. The Nittany and Bald Eagle Railroad interchanges with Norfolk Southern just south of the station. Three major highways, U.S. Route 220, Pennsylvania Route 453, and Interstate 99 all pass through the town. The closest commercial airport to Tyrone is State College Regional Airport, located 27.5 miles away.

== Education ==
The school district is the Tyrone Area School District.

== Film ==
In October 2009, several scenes for the Tony Scott film Unstoppable (with Denzel Washington, Chris Pine, and Rosario Dawson) were filmed in and around Tyrone, mostly at the 14th street crossing and the north end of the rail yard. Several hundred residents were employed as background extras. The film was released on November 12, 2010.

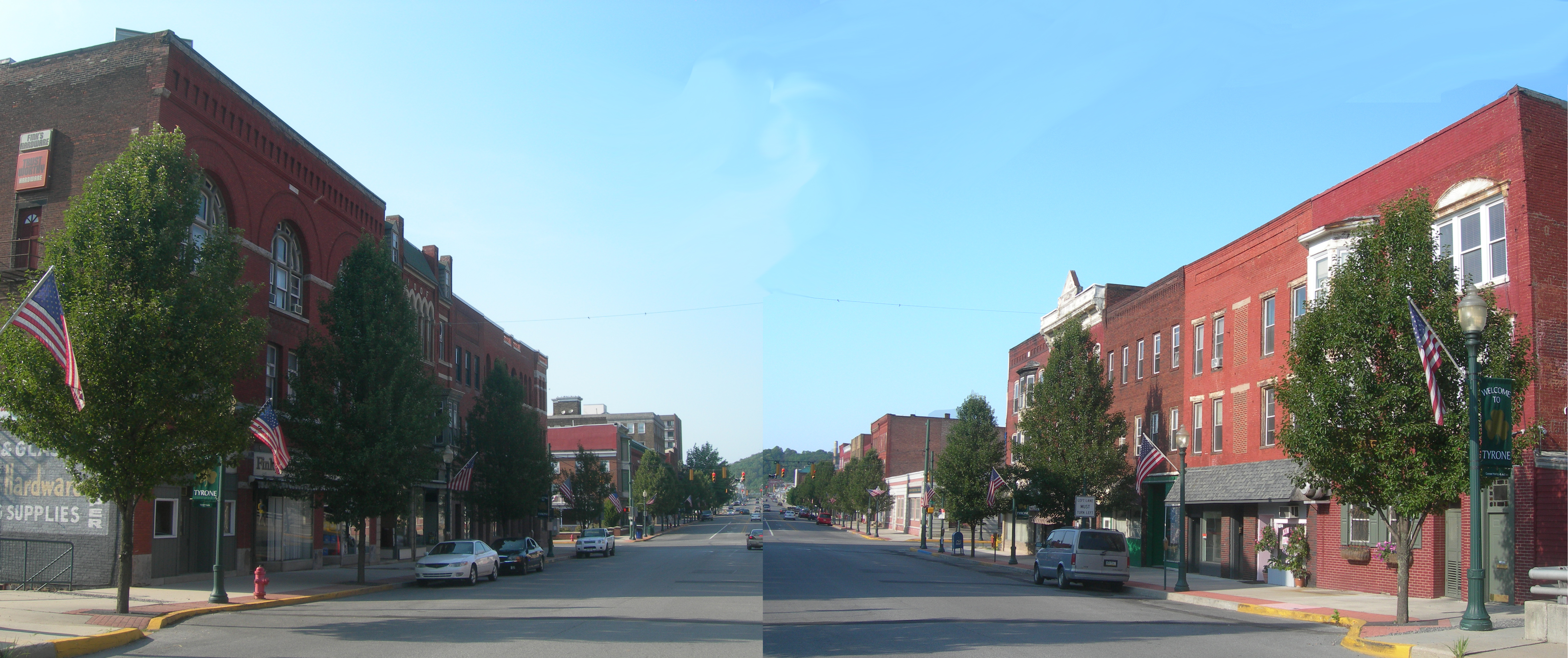
Tyrone Historic Downtown 2012

== Media ==
Since 1887, the Tyrone Daily Herald has been the newspaper of record for Tyrone. WTRN, the local radio station in Tyrone, has been on the air since 1955, when Tyrone resident Cary Simpson founded it. The station broadcasts at 1340 AM and simulcasts over 100.7 FM, with a format of adult contemporary music, local news, and high school sports.

== Notable people ==
- Seward Hiltner (1909–1984), prominent professor, author, and pastoral theologian
- Vernon E. James (1929–2010), US Army major general
- Dylan Lane (born 1977), game show host (born in Tyrone, spent whole childhood in Huntingdon)
- Emme Rylan (born 1980), film and television actress (graduated from Tyrone High School
- D. Brooks Smith (born 1951), a federal judge - the United States Third Circuit Court of Appeals
- Ethan Stiefel (born 1973), former principal dancer with the American Ballet Theatre
- Fred Waring (1900–1984), musician and radio-television personality
- Farran Zerbe (1871–1949) prominent numismatist
