= List of places in Pennsylvania: F–G =

This list of current cities, towns, unincorporated communities, counties, and other recognized places in the U.S. state of Pennsylvania also includes information on the number and names of counties in which the place lies, and its lower and upper zip code bounds, if applicable.

Name of place	Number of counties	Principal county	Lower zip code	Upper zip code
F M Corners	1	Mercer County		
Factory Hill	1	Fayette County		
Factoryville	1	Northampton County	18013	
Factoryville	1	Wyoming County	18419	
Fades	1	Luzerne County		
Fagleysville	1	Montgomery County	19525	
Fagundus	1	Warren County		
Fair Acres	1	York County	17070	
Fair Grounds	1	Greene County	15344	
Fair Haven	1	Allegheny County		
Fairbank	1	Fayette County	15435	
Fairbanks	1	Westmoreland County		
Fairbrook	1	Centre County	16865	
Fairchance	1	Fayette County	15436	
Fairdale	1	Greene County	15320	
Fairdale	1	Susquehanna County	18801	
Fairfield	1	Adams County	17320	
Fairfield	1	Lancaster County		
Fairfield	1	Erie County	16510	
Fairfield	1	Lancaster County		
Fairfield	1	Washington County	15345	
Fairfield Heights	1	Indiana County		
Fairfield Township	1	Crawford County		
Fairfield Township	1	Lycoming County		
Fairfield Township	1	Westmoreland County		
Fairhaven Heights	1	Allegheny County	15137	
Fairhill	1	Bucks County	19440	
Fairhill	1	Philadelphia County	19133	
Fairhill Junction	1	Philadelphia County		
Fairhope	1	Fayette County	15012	
Fairhope	1	Somerset County	15538	
Fairhope Township	1	Somerset County		
Fairland	1	Lancaster County	17543	
Fairlawn	1	Lycoming County	17728	
Fairless Hills	1	Bucks County	19030	
Fairless Junction	1	Bucks County		
Fairmont	1	Westmoreland County	15642	
Fairmount	1	Butler County		
Fairmount	1	Lancaster County	17566	
Fairmount	1	Philadelphia County	19121	
Fairmount	1	Wayne County		
Fairmount	1	Westmoreland County		
Fairmount City	1	Clarion County	16224	
Fairmount Springs	1	Luzerne County	17814	
Fairmount Township	1	Luzerne County		
Fairoaks	1	Allegheny County	15003	
Fairoaks	1	Montgomery County	19044	
Fairplain	1	Erie County	16423	
Fairplay	1	Adams County	17325	
Fairview	1	Beaver County	15052	
Fairview	1	Blair County	16601	
Fairview	1	Butler County	16050	
Fairview	1	Clearfield County	16858	
Fairview	1	Delaware County		
Fairview	1	Elk County		
Fairview	1	Erie County	16415	
Fairview	1	Franklin County	17268	
Fairview	1	Huntingdon County		
Fairview	1	Jefferson County	15767	
Fairview	1	Mercer County	16124	
Fairview	1	Mifflin County	17044	
Fairview	1	Northampton County		
Fairview	1	Northumberland County	17872	
Fairview Drive	1	York County	17331	
Fairview-Ferndale	1	Northumberland County		
Fairview Heights	1	Allegheny County	15238	
Fairview Heights	1	Berks County	19533	
Fairview Heights	1	Luzerne County	18707	
Fairview Heights	1	McKean County		
Fairview Hills	1	Luzerne County	18707	
Fairview Knolls	1	Northampton County	18042	
Fairview Park	1	Chester County	19380	
Fairview Park	1	Lancaster County	17603	
Fairview Park	1	Luzerne County	18707	
Fairview Park	1	York County		
Fairview Township	1	Butler County		
Fairview Township	1	Erie County		
Fairview Township	1	Luzerne County		
Fairview Township	1	Mercer County		
Fairview Township	1	York County		
Fairview Village	1	Montgomery County	19409	
Fairville	1	Chester County	19317	
Fairville	1	Union County	17837	
Fairywood	1	Allegheny County		
Falconcrest	1	Chester County	19380	
Fall Brook	1	Tioga County		
Fallen Timbers	1	Fayette County	15451	
Falling Spring	1	Franklin County	17201	
Falling Spring	1	Perry County	17040	
Fallowfield Township	1	Washington County		
Falls	1	Wyoming County	18615	
Falls Creek	2	Clearfield County	15840	
Falls Creek	2	Jefferson County	15840	
Falls Township	1	Bucks County		
Falls Township	1	Wyoming County		
Fallsdale	1	Wayne County		
Fallsington	1	Bucks County	19054	
Fallston	1	Beaver County	15066	
Falmouth	1	Lancaster County	17502	
Fannett Township	1	Franklin County		
Fannettsburg	1	Franklin County	17221	
Faraday Park	1	Delaware County	19070	
Farm School	1	Bucks County	18901	
Farmbrook	1	Bucks County		
Farmdale	1	Lancaster County	17552	
Farmers	1	York County	17364	
Farmers Mills	1	Centre County	16875	
Farmers Valley	1	Bradford County	16947	
Farmers Valley	1	McKean County	16749	
Farmersville	1	Lancaster County	17522	
Farmersville	1	Northampton County	18042	
Farmington	1	Berks County	19359	
Farmington	1	Fayette County	15437	
Farmington	1	Lehigh County	18103	
Farmington Hill	1	Tioga County		
Farmington Township	1	Clarion County		
Farmington Township	1	Tioga County		
Farmington Township	1	Warren County		
Farquhar Estates	1	York County	17403	
Farragut	1	Lycoming County	17754	
Farrandsville	1	Clinton County	17734	
Farrell	1	Mercer County	16121	
Farview	1	Berks County	19607	
Farwell	1	Clinton County	17764	
Fassett	1	Bradford County	16925	
Faunce	1	Clearfield County	16863	
Fauncetown	1	Crawford County		
Fawn Grove	1	York County	17321	
Fawn Township	1	Allegheny County		
Fawn Township	1	York County		
Faxon	1	Lycoming County	17701	
Fay Terrace	1	Mercer County	16125	
Fayette	1	Fayette County		
Fayette	1	Lawrence County	16156	
Fayette City	1	Fayette County	15438	
Fayette Township	1	Juniata County		
Fayetteville	1	Allegheny County		
Fayetteville	1	Franklin County	17222	
Fayfield	1	York County	17402	
Fearnot	1	Schuylkill County	17968	
Feasterville	1	Bucks County	19053	
Feasterville-Trevose	1	Bucks County	19047	
Federal	1	Allegheny County	15071	
Fell Township	1	Lackawanna County		
Fells Corners	1	Lackawanna County		
Fellsburg	1	Westmoreland County	15012	
Fellwick	1	Montgomery County	19034	
Felton	1	York County	17322	
Feltonville	1	Delaware County	19013	
Feltonville	1	Philadelphia County		
Fenelton	1	Butler County	16034	
Fenmore	1	York County		
Ferguson	1	Allegheny County	15101	
Ferguson	1	Fayette County		
Ferguson Township	1	Centre County		
Ferguson Township	1	Clearfield County		
Fergusonville	1	Bucks County	19007	
Fermanagh Township	1	Juniata County		
Fern	1	Clarion County	16363	
Fern Brook	1	Luzerne County	18612	
Fern Glen	1	Luzerne County	18241	
Fern Hill	1	Chester County	19380	
Fern Rock	1	Philadelphia County		
Fern Village	1	Montgomery County	19040	
Ferndale	1	Bucks County	18921	
Ferndale	1	Cambria County	15905	
Ferndale	1	Northumberland County	17872	
Ferndale	1	Schuylkill County	17985	
Ferney	1	Clinton County		
Fernglen	1	Lancaster County		
Fernridge	1	Monroe County	18334	
Fernville	1	Columbia County	17815	
Fernway	1	Butler County	16063	
Fernwood	1	Clearfield County	16680	
Ferrellton	1	Somerset County	15563	
Ferris	1	Butler County	16040	
Ferris Corners	1	Crawford County	16403	
Fertigs	1	Venango County	16364	
Fertility	1	Lancaster County	17602	
Fetterville	1	Lancaster County	17555	
Fetzertown	1	Centre County		
Feys Grove	1	Luzerne County		
Fiddlergreen	1	Warren County		
Fiddlers Green	1	Cambria County	15946	
Fiddletown	1	Monroe County		
Fiedler	1	Centre County		
Fieldmore Springs	1	Crawford County	16354	
Fieldsons Crossroads	1	Greene County	15338	
Fifficktown	1	Cambria County	15956	
Fiketown	1	Fayette County	15459	
Filbert	1	Fayette County	15435	
Filer Corners	1	Mercer County		
Filetown	1	Northampton County		
Fillmore	1	Centre County	16823	
Finch Hill	1	Lackawanna County	18407	
Findlay Township	1	Allegheny County		
Findley Township	1	Mercer County		
Finland	1	Bucks County	18073	
Finley Mills	1	Jefferson County	15767	
Finleyville	1	Bedford County	16679	
Finleyville	1	Washington County	15332	
Finney	1	Washington County		
Finton	1	Cambria County		
Fireside Terrace	1	York County		
First Fork	1	Cameron County		
Fisher	1	Clarion County	16225	
Fisher	1	Indiana County		
Fisher	1	Washington County		
Fisher Corners	1	Delaware County		
Fisher Heights	1	Butler County		
Fisher Heights	1	Washington County	15063	
Fisherdale	1	Columbia County	17824	
Fishermans Paradise	1	Centre County		
Fishers	1	Philadelphia County		
Fishers Corner	1	Delaware County	19013	
Fishers Ferry	1	Northumberland County	17801	
Fishertown	1	Bedford County	15539	
Fishertown	1	Cambria County	15956	
Fisherville	1	Blair County	16693	
Fisherville	1	Chester County	19335	
Fisherville	1	Dauphin County	17032	
Fishing Creek	1	Lancaster County		
Fishing Creek Township	1	Columbia County		
Fisk Mill	1	Susquehanna County		
Fiske	1	Cambria County	16639	
Fitz Henry	1	Westmoreland County	15479	
Fitzwatertown	1	Montgomery County		
Five Corners	1	Crawford County	16404	
Five Locks	1	Berks County		
Five Points	1	Berks County	19606	
Five Points	1	Butler County		
Five Points	1	Chester County	19348	
Five Points	1	Clarion County		
Five Points	1	Clearfield County	15753	
Five Points	1	Columbia County		
Five Points	1	Elk County		
Five Points	1	Erie County	16509	
Five Points	1	Indiana County	15732	
Five Points	1	Luzerne County	18249	
Five Points	1	Mercer County	16133	
Five Points	1	Mercer County	16150	
Five Points	1	Montgomery County	19422	
Five Points	1	Northampton County		
Five Points	1	Northumberland County	17772	
Five Points	1	Potter County		
Five Points	1	Venango County		
Five Points	1	Westmoreland County	15601	
Fivepointville	1	Lancaster County	17517	
Flaggs Manor	1	Chester County		
Flat Rock	1	Centre County		
Flat Rock	1	Fayette County	15459	
Flatwoods	1	Fayette County	15486	
Fleetville	1	Lackawanna County	18420	
Fleetwood	1	Berks County	19522	
Fleming	1	Centre County	16835	
Fleming Summit	1	Indiana County	15729	
Flemington	1	Clinton County	17745	
Flickerville	1	Fulton County		
Flicksville	1	Northampton County	18050	
Flinton	1	Cambria County	16640	
Flintville	1	Lebanon County	17042	
Flora	1	Indiana County		
Floradale	1	Adams County	17307	
Floreffe	1	Allegheny County	15025	
Florence	1	Northampton County		
Florence	1	Washington County	15040	
Florida Park	1	Delaware County	19073	
Florin	1	Lancaster County	17552	
Florys Mill	1	Lancaster County		
Flourtown	1	Montgomery County	19031	
Flower Hill	1	Delaware County		
Flowing Spring	1	Blair County		
Flushing	1	Bucks County		
Flying Hills	1	Berks County		
Fogelsville	1	Lehigh County	18051	
Folcroft	1	Delaware County	19032	
Foley	1	Somerset County		
Foleys Siding	1	Allegheny County	15234	
Folsom	1	Delaware County	19033	
Folstown	1	Luzerne County	18707	
Foltz	1	Franklin County		
Fombell	1	Beaver County	16123	
Font	1	Chester County	19335	
Fontaine	1	Chester County		
Fontana	1	Lebanon County	17042	
Foot of Ten	1	Blair County	16635	
Footedale	1	Fayette County	15468	
Forbes Road	1	Westmoreland County	15633	
Force	1	Elk County	15841	
Ford City	1	Armstrong County	16226	
Ford Cliff	1	Armstrong County	16228	
Fordview	1	Armstrong County	16226	
Fordville	1	York County	17364	
Fordyce	1	Greene County	15370	
Foreman	1	Bedford County		
Forest Castle	1	Luzerne County	18643	
Forest City	1	Susquehanna County	18421	
Forest City Station	1	Wayne County		
Forest Grove	1	Allegheny County	15108	
Forest Grove	1	Bucks County	18922	
Forest Hill	1	Union County	17844	
Forest Hills	1	Allegheny County	15221	
Forest Hills	1	Lancaster County	17540	
Forest Hills	1	Philadelphia County		
Forest Inn	1	Carbon County	18235	
Forest Knolls	1	Lancaster County	17575	
Forest Lake	1	Susquehanna County	18801	
Forest Lake Park	1	Pike County	18457	
Forest Lake Township	1	Susquehanna County		
Forest Park	1	Bucks County	18914	
Forest Park	1	Luzerne County	18702	
Forest Park	1	Pike County		
Forestville	1	Butler County	16035	
Forestville	1	Chester County	19390	
Forestville	1	Schuylkill County	17901	
Forestville	1	Sullivan County		
Forge	1	Blair County	16686	
Forks Township	1	Northampton County		
Forks Township	1	Sullivan County		
Forkston	1	Wyoming County	18629	
Forkston Township	1	Wyoming County		
Forksville	1	Sullivan County	18616	
Forsythia Gate	1	Bucks County		
Fort Couch	1	Cumberland County		
Fort Fetter	1	Blair County	16648	
Fort Hill	1	Montgomery County		
Fort Hill	1	Somerset County	15540	
Fort Hunter	1	Dauphin County	17110	
Fort Indiantown Gap	1	Lebanon County	17003	
Fort Littleton	1	Fulton County	17223	
Fort Loudon	1	Franklin County	17224	
Fort Mifflin	1	Philadelphia County	19153	19153
Fort Necessity National Battlefield	1	Fayette County	15437	
Fort Pitt	1	Allegheny County		
Fort Pittsburgh	1	Allegheny County		
Fort Robertson	1	Perry County	17047	
Fort Washington	1	Montgomery County	19034	
Fortenia	1	Wayne County		
Fortney	1	York County	17339	
Fortuna	1	Montgomery County		
Forty Fort	1	Luzerne County	18704	
Forward	1	Somerset County		
Forward Township	1	Allegheny County		
Forward Township	1	Butler County		
Forwardstown	1	Somerset County		
Fossilville	1	Bedford County	15534	
Foster	1	Indiana County	15681	
Foster	1	Susquehanna County		
Foster	1	Venango County		
Foster Brook	1	McKean County	16701	
Foster Township	1	Luzerne County		
Foster Township	1	McKean County		
Foster Township	1	Schuylkill County		
Fosters Corner	1	Venango County		
Fosters Mills	1	Armstrong County		
Fosterville	1	Westmoreland County		
Fostoria	1	Blair County	16686	
Foundryville	1	Columbia County	18603	
Fountain	1	Centre County		
Fountain	1	Schuylkill County	17938	
Fountain Dale	1	Adams County	17320	
Fountain Hill	1	Lehigh County	18015	
Fountain House Corners	1	Crawford County	16433	
Fountain Springs	1	Schuylkill County	17921	
Fountainville	1	Bucks County	18923	
Foustown	1	York County	17404	
Foustwell	1	Somerset County	15935	
Fowler Heights	1	Indiana County	15701	
Fox Chapel	1	Allegheny County	15238	
Fox Chase	1	Lancaster County	17601	
Fox Chase	1	Philadelphia County	19111	
Fox Hill	1	Franklin County	17268	
Fox Hill	1	Luzerne County	18702	
Fox Hill	1	Potter County		
Fox Ridge	1	Allegheny County		
Fox Run	1	Butler County		
Fox Township	1	Elk County		
Fox Township	1	Sullivan County		
Foxburg	1	Cambria County	15773	
Foxburg	1	Clarion County	16036	
Foxcroft	1	Delaware County	19008	
Foxcroft	1	Montgomery County	19046	
Foxcroft West	1	Delaware County	19008	
Foxdale	1	Westmoreland County	15672	
Foxtown	1	Westmoreland County	15697	
Foxtown Hill	1	Monroe County	18360	
Foxwood Park	1	Delaware County	19008	
Frackville	1	Schuylkill County	17931	
Frackville Junction	1	Schuylkill County		
Frailey Township	1	Schuylkill County		
Francis	1	Erie County	16417	
Francis Mine	1	Washington County	15021	
Franconia	1	Montgomery County	18924	
Franconia Township	1	Montgomery County		
Frank	1	Allegheny County	15018	
Frankford Arsenal	1	Philadelphia County	19137	
Frankford Junction	1	Philadelphia County		
Frankfort Springs	1	Beaver County	15050	
Franklin	1	Cambria County	15909	
Franklin	1	Venango County	16323	
Franklin Center	1	Delaware County	19063	
Franklin Center	1	Erie County		
Franklin Corners	1	Erie County	16412	
Franklin Farms	1	Washington County	15301	
Franklin Forks	1	Susquehanna County	18801	
Franklin Furnace	1	Franklin County	17201	
Franklin Furnace	1	Montour County		
Franklin Hill	1	Susquehanna County	18822	
Franklin Junction	1	Luzerne County		
Franklin Park	1	Allegheny County	15143	
Franklin Pike Corners	1	Crawford County		
Franklin Township	1	Adams County		
Franklin Township	1	Allegheny County		
Franklin Township	1	Beaver County		
Franklin Township	1	Bradford County		
Franklin Township	1	Butler County		
Franklin Township	1	Carbon County		
Franklin Township	1	Chester County		
Franklin Township	1	Columbia County		
Franklin Township	1	Erie County		
Franklin Township	1	Fayette County		
Franklin Township	1	Greene County		
Franklin Township	1	Huntingdon County		
Franklin Township	1	Luzerne County		
Franklin Township	1	Lycoming County		
Franklin Township	1	Snyder County		
Franklin Township	1	Susquehanna County		
Franklin Township	1	York County		
Franklindale	1	Bradford County	18832	
Franklintown	1	York County	17323	
Franklinville	1	Huntingdon County	16683	
Franklinville	1	Montgomery County		
Frankstown	1	Blair County	16648	
Frankstown Township	1	Blair County		
Frazer	1	Chester County	19355	
Frazer Township	1	Allegheny County		
Frazier Mill	1	Butler County		
Frederick	1	Montgomery County	19435	
Fredericksburg	1	Armstrong County	16041	
Fredericksburg	1	Blair County	16662	
Fredericksburg	1	Crawford County	16335	
Fredericksburg	1	Lebanon County	17026	
Fredericksville	1	Berks County	19539	
Fredericktown	1	Washington County	15333	
Fredericktown Hill	1	Washington County	15333	
Fredericktown-Millsboro	1	Washington County	15333	
Fredonia	1	Mercer County	16124	
Freeburg	1	Snyder County	17827	
Freedom	1	Beaver County	15042	
Freedom Township	1	Adams County		
Freedom Township	1	Blair County		
Freehold Township	1	Warren County		
Freeland	1	Luzerne County	18224	
Freeman	1	McKean County		
Freemansburg	1	Northampton County	18017	
Freemanville	1	Berks County	19607	
Freemont	1	Chester County		
Freeport	1	Armstrong County	16229	
Freeport	1	Erie County	16428	
Freeport Junction	1	Armstrong County	16229	
Freeport Mills	1	Lebanon County		
Freeport Township	1	Greene County		
Fremont	1	Snyder County		
French Creek Falls	1	Chester County		
French Creek Township	1	Mercer County		
French Settlement	1	Lycoming County		
Frenchcreek Township	1	Venango County		
Frenchs Corners	1	Armstrong County	16210	
Frenchtown	1	Crawford County	16327	
Frenchtown	1	Lycoming County		
Frenchville	1	Clearfield County	16836	
Freys Grove	1	Dauphin County	17057	
Freysville	1	York County	17356	
Freytown	1	Lackawanna County		
Fricks	1	Bucks County	18932	
Fricks Lock	1	Chester County	19464	
Friedens	1	Lehigh County	18080	
Friedens	1	Somerset County	15541	
Friedensburg	1	Schuylkill County	17933	
Friedensville	1	Lehigh County	18017	
Friendship Heights	1	Fayette County	15467	
Friendship Hill National Historic Site	1	Fayette County	15437	
Friendship Village	1	Chester County	19320	
Friendsville	1	Susquehanna County	18818	
Friesville	1	Blair County	16625	
Frills Corners	1	Clarion County		
Frinks	1	Potter County		
Frisbie	1	Schuylkill County	17961	
Frisco	1	Beaver County	16117	
Fritztown	1	Berks County	19608	
Frizzleburg	1	Lawrence County		
Frogtown	1	Armstrong County	16028	
Frogtown	1	Clarion County	16242	
Frogtown	1	Huntingdon County	16877	
Frogtown	1	Washington County		
Frogtown	1	York County	17070	
Froman	1	Washington County		
Frostburg	1	Jefferson County	15740	
Frosts	1	Forest County		
Frugality	1	Cambria County	16639	
Fruittown	1	Centre County		
Fruitville	1	Lancaster County	17601	
Fruitville	1	Montgomery County	19473	
Frush Valley	1	Berks County	19605	
Frutcheys	1	Monroe County	18301	
Fryburg	1	Clarion County	16326	
Frye	1	Washington County	15063	
Frystown	1	Berks County	17067	
Frysville	1	Lancaster County		
Fuhrmans Mill	1	York County		
Fuller	1	Fayette County		
Fuller	1	Jefferson County		
Fullerton	1	Lehigh County	18052	
Fullerton	1	McKean County		
Fulmor	1	Montgomery County		
Fulmor Heights	1	Montgomery County	19040	
Fulton Run	1	Indiana County	15701	
Fulton Township	1	Lancaster County		
Furlong	1	Bucks County	18925	
Furnace Hill	1	Fayette County		
Furnace Hill	1	Mercer County		
Furnace Run	1	Armstrong County	16210	
Furniss	1	Lancaster County	17563	
Furnondaga	1	Jefferson County		
Gabby Heights	1	Washington County	15301	
Gabelsville	1	Berks County	19512	
Gaffney	1	McKean County		
Gahagen	1	Somerset County	15926	
Gaiblton	1	Indiana County	15747	
Gaines	1	Tioga County	16921	
Gaines Township	1	Tioga County		
Gale	1	Washington County		
Galena Hill	1	Venango County		
Galeton	1	Potter County	16922	
Galilee	1	Wayne County	18415	
Gallagher Township	1	Clinton County		
Gallagherville	1	Chester County	19335	
Gallatin	1	Allegheny County	15063	
Gallatin	1	Fayette County		
Gallitzin	1	Cambria County	16641	
Gallitzin Township	1	Cambria County		
Galloway	1	Venango County	16323	
Gallows Harbor	1	Clearfield County		
Gallows Hill	1	Bucks County		
Gamble Township	1	Lycoming County		
Gambles	1	Washington County		
Ganister	1	Blair County	16693	
Gans	1	Fayette County	15439	
Gap	1	Lancaster County	17527	
Gapsville	1	Bedford County	15533	
Garards Fort	1	Greene County	15334	
Gardeau	1	McKean County	16737	
Garden City	1	Allegheny County	15146	
Garden City	1	Delaware County	19063	
Garden Heights	1	Blair County		
Garden Hills	1	Lancaster County	17603	
Garden Mart	1	Montgomery County	19464	
Garden View	1	Lycoming County	17702	
Garden View	1	Mifflin County	17084	
Gardendale	1	Delaware County	19061	
Gardenville	1	Bucks County	18926	
Gardner	1	Centre County		
Gardner	1	Lawrence County	16101	
Gardner Hill	1	Elk County		
Gardners	1	Adams County	17324	
Garfield	1	Berks County	19506	
Gargol	1	Adams County		
Garland	1	Warren County	16416	
Garman	1	Cambria County	15714	
Garmantown	1	Cambria County		
Garrett	1	Somerset County	15542	
Garrett Hill	1	Delaware County	19010	
Garrettford	1	Delaware County	19026	
Garrison	1	Greene County	15352	
Garvers Ferry	1	Westmoreland County	16229	
Garvey Melton	1	Allegheny County		
Gascola	1	Allegheny County	15235	
Gaskill Township	1	Jefferson County		
Gastonville	1	Washington County	15336	
Gastown	1	Armstrong County	15774	
Gatchellville	1	York County	17352	
Gates	1	Fayette County	15410	
Gatesburg	1	Centre County	16877	
Gateway Center	1	Allegheny County	15222	
Gauff Hill	1	Lehigh County	18017	
Gayly	1	Allegheny County	15136	
Gaysport	1	Blair County	16648	
Gazzam	1	Clearfield County		
Gearhart Township	1	Northumberland County		
Gearhartville	1	Clearfield County	16866	
Gebhart	1	Somerset County		
Geeseytown	1	Blair County	16648	
Geiger	1	Somerset County	15541	
Geigertown	1	Berks County	19523	
Geistown	1	Cambria County	15904	
Gelatt	1	Susquehanna County	18825	
General Warren Village	1	Chester County	19355	
General Wayne	1	Montgomery County	19004	
Genesee	1	Potter County	16923	
Genesee Township	1	Potter County		
Geneva	1	Crawford County	16316	
Geneva Hill	1	Beaver County	15010	
George	1	Washington County		
George School	1	Bucks County	18940	
Georges Station	1	Westmoreland County		
Georges Township	1	Fayette County		
Georgetown	1	Adams County	17340	
Georgetown	1	Armstrong County	15656	
Georgetown	1	Beaver County	15043	
Georgetown	1	Lancaster County		
Georgetown	1	Luzerne County	18702	
Georgetown	1	Northampton County	18064	
Georgeville	1	Indiana County	15759	
German Corners	1	Lehigh County	18053	
German Settlement	1	Centre County		
German Township	1	Fayette County		
Germania	1	Potter County	16922	
Germans	1	Carbon County	18235	
Germansville	1	Lehigh County	18053	
Germantown	1	Adams County	17340	
Germantown	1	Cambria County		
Germantown	1	Columbia County		
Germantown	1	Franklin County	17222	
Germantown	1	Philadelphia County	19144	
Germantown	1	Pike County		
Germany	1	Indiana County		
Germany Township	1	Adams County		
Geryville	1	Bucks County	18073	
Getty Heights	1	Indiana County	15701	
Gettysburg	1	Adams County	17325	
Gettysburg Junction	1	Cumberland County	17013	
Gettysburg National Military Park	1	Adams County	17325	
Ghennes Heights	1	Washington County	15063	
Ghent	1	Bradford County	18850	
Gibbon Glade	1	Fayette County	15440	
Gibbs Hill	1	McKean County		
Gibraltar	1	Berks County	19508	
Gibson	1	Susquehanna County	18820	
Gibson	1	Washington County	15314	
Gibson Township	1	Cameron County		
Gibson Township	1	Susquehanna County		
Gibsonia	1	Allegheny County	15044	
Gibsons Point	1	Philadelphia County		
Gibsonton	1	Westmoreland County	15012	
Gideon	1	Somerset County		
Gifford	1	McKean County	16732	
Gilbert	1	Monroe County	18331	
Gilberton	1	Schuylkill County	17934	
Gilbertsville	1	Montgomery County	19525	
Gilfoyl	1	Forest County	16239	
Gilkeson	1	Washington County		
Gill Hall	1	Allegheny County	15025	
Gillespie	1	Fayette County	15438	
Gillett	1	Bradford County	16925	
Gillingham	1	Clearfield County		
Gillintown	1	Centre County		
Gilmore	1	Fayette County	15401	
Gilmore	1	McKean County	16727	
Gilmore	1	Washington County	15057	
Gilmore Acres	1	Allegheny County	15235	
Gilmore Township	1	Greene County		
Gilpin	1	Indiana County		
Gilpin Township	1	Armstrong County		
Ginger Hill	1	Washington County	15063	
Ginter	1	Clearfield County	16651	
Ginther	1	Schuylkill County	18252	
Gipsy	1	Indiana County	15741	
Girard	1	Erie County	16417	
Girard Junction	1	Erie County		
Girard Manor	1	Schuylkill County		
Girard Point	1	Philadelphia County		
Girard Township	1	Clearfield County		
Girard Township	1	Erie County		
Girardville	1	Schuylkill County	17935	
Girdland	1	Wayne County		
Girty	1	Armstrong County	15686	
Gitts Run	1	York County	17331	
Gladden	1	Allegheny County	15057	
Gladden Heights	1	Washington County	15057	
Glade	1	Somerset County	15530	
Glade	1	Warren County	16365	
Glade City	1	Somerset County	15552	
Glade Mills	1	Butler County		
Glade Township	1	Warren County		
Glades	1	Fayette County		
Glades	1	York County	17402	
Gladhill	1	Adams County		
Gladstone	1	Delaware County	19050	
Gladwyne	1	Montgomery County	19035	
Glanford	1	Allegheny County		
Glasgow	1	Beaver County	15059	
Glasgow	1	Cambria County	16644	
Glasgow	1	Montgomery County	19464	
Glass City	1	Centre County	16866	
Glassmere	1	Allegheny County	15030	
Glassport	1	Allegheny County	15045	
Glassworks	1	Greene County	15338	
Glatfelter	1	York County	17360	
Gleason	1	Tioga County	17724	
Gleasonton	1	Clinton County	17760	
Glen	1	Chester County		
Glen Acres	1	Chester County	19380	
Glen Ashton Farms	1	Bucks County	19020	
Glen Campbell	1	Indiana County	15742	
Glen Carbon	1	Schuylkill County	17901	
Glen Dower	1	Schuylkill County	17901	
Glen Eden	1	Butler County		
Glen Eyre	1	Pike County		
Glen Forney	1	Franklin County	17268	
Glen Hazel	1	Elk County	15870	
Glen Hope	1	Clearfield County	16645	
Glen Iron	1	Union County	17845	
Glen Junction	1	Luzerne County		
Glen Lyon	1	Luzerne County	18617	
Glen Mawr	1	Lycoming County	17737	
Glen Mills	1	Delaware County	19342	
Glen Moore	1	Lancaster County	17601	
Glen Onoko	1	Carbon County		
Glen Richey	1	Clearfield County	16837	
Glen Riddle	1	Delaware County	19037	
Glen Riddle-Lima	1	Delaware County	19037	
Glen Rock	1	York County	17327	
Glen Roy	1	Chester County	19362	
Glen Savage	1	Somerset County	15538	
Glen Summit	1	Luzerne County	18707	
Glen Summit Springs	1	Luzerne County		
Glen Union	1	Clinton County		
Glenburn	1	Lackawanna County	18411	
Glenburn Township	1	Lackawanna County		
Glencoe	1	Somerset County	15538	
Glendale	1	Allegheny County	15106	
Glendale	1	Bucks County	18938	
Glendale	1	Luzerne County	18641	
Glendale Gardens	1	Delaware County	19036	
Glendon	1	Northampton County	18042	
Glendon	1	Schuylkill County	17948	
Glenfield	1	Allegheny County	15143	
Glenhall	1	Chester County	19380	19382
Glenhurst	1	Montgomery County	19009	
Glenlake	1	Bucks County		
Glenloch	1	Chester County	19380	
Glenmar Gardens	1	Erie County		
Glenmoore	1	Chester County	19343	
Glennville	1	Chester County		
Glenolden	1	Delaware County	19036	
Glenrose	1	Chester County	19320	
Glenruadh	1	Erie County	16509	
Glenshaw	1	Allegheny County	15116	
Glenside	1	Montgomery County	19038	
Glenside Gardens	1	Montgomery County	19038	
Glenside Heights	1	Montgomery County	19038	
Glenview	1	Allegheny County	15116	
Glenville	1	York County	17329	
Glenwall Village	1	Beaver County	15001	
Glenwillard	1	Allegheny County	15046	
Glenwood	1	Allegheny County		
Glenwood	1	Dauphin County	17109	
Glenwood	1	Erie County		
Glenwood	1	Susquehanna County	18446	
Glenwood Junction	1	Allegheny County		
Glenworth	1	Schuylkill County	17901	
Glessner	1	Somerset County		
Globe Mills	1	Snyder County		
Glosser View	1	Lycoming County	17701	
Glyde	1	Washington County		
Glyndon	1	Crawford County	16434	
Gnatstown	1	York County	17331	
Gobbler Knob	1	Clearfield County		
Godard	1	Erie County		
Godfrey	1	Armstrong County	15656	
Goehring	1	Beaver County		
Goff	1	Butler County	16020	
Goheenville	1	Armstrong County	16259	
Gold	1	Potter County	16923	
Gold Mine	1	Lebanon County		
Golden Hill	1	Wyoming County	18623	
Golden Rod Farms	1	Clearfield County		
Goldenridge	1	Bucks County		
Goldenville	1	Adams County		
Goldsboro	1	York County	17319	
Golf Villa	1	Delaware County	19083	
Golinza	1	Forest County		
Good	1	Franklin County	17268	
Good Hope	1	Cumberland County	17055	
Good Hope Mill	1	Cumberland County		
Good Intent	1	Washington County	15323	
Good Spring	1	Schuylkill County	17981	
Goodmans Corners	1	Venango County	16364	
Goods Corner	1	Cambria County	15906	
Goodtown	1	Somerset County	15530	
Goodville	1	Juniata County	17094	
Goodville	1	Lancaster County	17528	
Goodyear	1	Cumberland County	17324	
Gooseberry	1	Bedford County		
Goosetown	1	Chester County	19320	
Goram	1	York County		
Gordon	1	Schuylkill County	17936	
Gordonville	1	Lancaster County	17529	
Gorman Summit	1	Indiana County		
Gorsuch	1	Huntingdon County		
Gorton	1	Centre County		
Gosford	1	Armstrong County		
Goshen	1	Clearfield County		
Goshen	1	Lancaster County		
Goshen Township	1	Clearfield County		
Goshenville	1	Chester County	19380	
Gosser Hill	1	Westmoreland County	15656	
Gouglersville	1	Berks County	19608	
Gouldsboro	1	Wayne County	18424	
Gouldtown	1	Warren County		
Gowen	1	Luzerne County		
Gowen City	1	Northumberland County	17828	
Gracedale	1	Luzerne County		
Graceton	1	Indiana County	15748	
Graceville	1	Bedford County	15537	
Gracey	1	Fulton County	17228	
Gradyville	1	Delaware County	19039	
Grafton	1	Indiana County		
Graham	1	Clearfield County	16866	
Graham Crossing	1	Fayette County		
Graham Township	1	Clearfield County		
Grampian	1	Clearfield County	16838	
Grand Valley	1	Warren County	16420	
Grand View	1	Bedford County		
Grand View Park	1	Montgomery County	19426	
Grandview	1	Armstrong County	16201	
Grandview	1	Elk County		
Grandview	1	Indiana County	15701	
Grandview	1	Venango County		
Grandview	1	Washington County	15063	
Grandview Heights	1	Lancaster County	17601	
Grandview Park	1	Elk County	15857	
Grandview Terrace	1	York County	17403	
Grange	1	Jefferson County	15767	
Grangeville	1	York County	17331	
Grant City	1	Lawrence County	16051	
Grant Township	1	Indiana County		
Grantham	1	Cumberland County	17027	
Grantley	1	York County		
Grantville	1	Dauphin County	17028	
Granville	1	Mifflin County	17029	
Granville	1	Washington County	15423	
Granville Center	1	Bradford County	16926	
Granville Summit	1	Bradford County	16926	
Granville Township	1	Bradford County		
Granville Township	1	Mifflin County		
Grapeville	1	Westmoreland County	15634	
Grass Flat	1	Clearfield County		
Grassflat	1	Clearfield County	16839	
Grassland	1	Delaware County		
Grassmere	1	Columbia County		
Grassmere Park	1	Columbia County	17814	
Grassy Island	1	Lackawanna County	18447	
Grassy Run Junction	1	Somerset County		
Graterford	1	Montgomery County	19426	
Graters Ford	1	Montgomery County		
Gratton	1	Indiana County	15716	
Gratz	1	Dauphin County	17030	
Gratztown	1	Westmoreland County	15089	
Gravel Lick	1	Clarion County		
Gravel Lick	1	Potter County		
Gravel Pit	1	Bedford County		
Gravel Place	1	Monroe County		
Gravers	1	Philadelphia County		
Gravity	1	Wayne County	18436	
Gray	1	Blair County		
Gray	1	Clearfield County		
Gray	1	Lycoming County		
Gray	1	Somerset County	15544	
Gray Township	1	Greene County		
Graybill	1	York County		
Graydon	1	York County	17322	
Grays	1	Westmoreland County		
Grays Ferry	1	Philadelphia County		
Grays Landing	1	Fayette County	15461	
Graysville	1	Greene County	15337	
Graysville	1	Huntingdon County	16683	
Grazier	1	Somerset County	15935	
Grazierville	1	Blair County	16686	
Greason	1	Cumberland County	17013	
Great Belt	1	Butler County		
Great Bend	1	Susquehanna County	18821	
Great Bend Township	1	Susquehanna County		
Greater Pittsburgh Air National Guard Base	1	Allegheny County	15108	
Greater Pittsburgh Int. Airport	1	Allegheny County	15231	
Greater Point Marion	1	Fayette County	17474	
Greble	1	Lebanon County	17067	
Greece City	1	Butler County	16025	
Greeley	1	Pike County	18425	
Green Acres	1	York County	17402	
Green Briar	1	Jefferson County		
Green Fields	1	Dauphin County	17098	
Green Grove	1	Centre County		
Green Grove	1	Lackawanna County	18447	
Green Hill	1	Chester County	19380	
Green Hill	1	Fulton County		
Green Hill	1	York County	17403	
Green Hills	1	Delaware County	19079	
Green Hills	1	Washington County	15301	
Green Lane	1	Montgomery County	18054	
Green Lane Farms	1	Cumberland County		
Green Lawn	1	Chester County		
Green Oaks	1	Venango County		
Green Park	1	Perry County	17024	
Green Point	1	Lebanon County	17038	
Green Ridge	1	Delaware County	19014	
Green Ridge	1	Lackawanna County		
Green Ridge	1	Luzerne County	18201	
Green Ridge	1	York County	17402	
Green Spring	1	Cumberland County	17241	
Green Springs	1	Adams County	17331	
Green Township	1	Forest County		
Green Township	1	Indiana County		
Green Tree	1	Allegheny County	15242	
Green Tree	1	Chester County	19355	
Green Valley	1	Allegheny County	15137	
Green Valley	1	Jefferson County	15825	
Green Valley Acres	1	Delaware County	19082	
Green Village	1	Franklin County	17201	
Greenawalds	1	Lehigh County	18104	
Greenback	1	Northumberland County		
Greenbank	1	Lancaster County	17557	
Greenbrier	1	Centre County	16875	
Greenbrier	1	Delaware County	19073	
Greenbrier	1	Northumberland County	17867	
Greenbrook	1	Bucks County		
Greenburr	1	Clinton County	17747	
Greenbury	1	Schuylkill County	17901	
Greencastle	1	Franklin County	17225	
Greencrest Park	1	Mercer County	16125	
Greendale	1	Armstrong County		
Greendale	1	McKean County	16735	
Greene	1	Lancaster County	17518	
Greene Junction	1	Fayette County	15425	
Greene Township	1	Beaver County		
Greene Township	1	Clinton County		
Greene Township	1	Erie County		
Greene Township	1	Franklin County		
Greene Township	1	Greene County		
Greene Township	1	Mercer County		
Greene Township	1	Pike County		
Greenfield	1	Allegheny County		
Greenfield	1	Cambria County		
Greenfield	1	Mercer County	16137	
Greenfield Manor	1	Berks County	19601	
Greenfield Township	1	Blair County		
Greenfield Township	1	Erie County		
Greenfield Township	1	Lackawanna County		
Greenfields	1	Berks County		
Greenland	1	Lancaster County		
Greenlawn Park	1	Bucks County	19007	
Greenmount	1	Adams County	17325	
Greenock	1	Allegheny County	15047	
Greenridge Farms	1	Montgomery County	19006	
Greens Landing	1	Bradford County	18810	
Greensboro	1	Greene County	15338	
Greensburg	1	Westmoreland County	15601	
Greenstone	1	Adams County	17320	
Greentown	1	Pike County	18426	
Greenview Park	1	Delaware County	19083	
Greenville	1	Clearfield County		
Greenville	1	Mercer County	16125	
Greenville East	1	Mercer County		
Greenville Township	1	Somerset County		
Greenwald	1	Westmoreland County	15670	
Greenwich	1	Cambria County	15714	
Greenwich Township	1	Berks County		
Greenwood	1	Blair County	16601	
Greenwood	1	Columbia County	17846	
Greenwood	1	Fayette County	15425	
Greenwood	1	Franklin County	17222	
Greenwood	1	Lackawanna County	18507	
Greenwood Heights	1	Fayette County		
Greenwood Hills	1	Dauphin County	17109	
Greenwood Township	1	Clearfield County		
Greenwood Township	1	Columbia County		
Greenwood Township	1	Crawford County		
Greenwood Township	1	Juniata County		
Greenwood Township	1	Perry County		
Greenwood Village	1	Butler County	16001	
Gregg	1	Allegheny County	15071	
Gregg Township	1	Centre County		
Gregg Township	1	Union County		
Gregory	1	Luzerne County	18704	
Greisemersville	1	Berks County		
Grenoble	1	Bucks County	18974	
Gresham	1	Crawford County	16354	
Greshville	1	Berks County	19512	
Gretna	1	Washington County	15301	
Greythorne	1	Cumberland County		
Grieder	1	Cumberland County		
Grier City	1	Schuylkill County	18214	
Grier City-Park Crest	1	Schuylkill County		
Griers Corner	1	Bucks County	18923	
Griesemersville	1	Berks County	19512	
Griffin	1	Fayette County		
Griffiths	1	McKean County	16735	
Griffithtown	1	Cambria County		
Grill	1	Berks County	19607	
Grimesville	1	Lycoming County	17701	
Grimms Crossroads	1	York County		
Grimville	1	Berks County	19530	
Grindstone	1	Fayette County	15442	
Grindstone-Rowes Run	1	Fayette County		
Gringo	1	Beaver County	15001	
Grisemore	1	Indiana County	15728	
Groffdale	1	Lancaster County	17557	
Grovania	1	Columbia County	17821	
Grove	1	Chester County	19380	
Grove Chapel	1	Indiana County	15701	
Grove City	1	Mercer County	16127	
Grove Mill	1	York County		
Grove Township	1	Cameron County		
Grover	1	Bradford County	17735	
Groveton	1	Allegheny County	15108	
Grugan Township	1	Clinton County		
Grundys Corner	1	Bucks County		
Gruversville	1	Bucks County		
Gruvertown	1	Northampton County	18013	
Guenot Settlement	1	Clearfield County		
Guernsey	1	Adams County	17307	
Guffey	1	McKean County	16740	
Guffey	1	Westmoreland County	15642	
Guilford	1	Franklin County	17201	
Guilford Springs	1	Franklin County	17201	
Guilford Township	1	Franklin County		
Guitonville	1	Forest County	16239	
Guldens	1	Adams County	17325	
Gulich Township	1	Clearfield County		
Gulph Mills	1	Montgomery County	19428	
Gum Run	1	Luzerne County		
Gum Stump	1	Centre County		
Gum Tree	1	Chester County	19320	
Gump	1	Greene County	15370	
Gurnee	1	Tioga County		
Gurney Hill	1	Venango County		
Guth	1	Lehigh County	18104	
Guthriesville	1	Chester County	19335	
Guthsville	1	Lehigh County	18069	
Guyasuta	1	Allegheny County	15215	
Guyaux	1	Fayette County		
Guys Mills	1	Crawford County	16327	
Gwynedd	1	Montgomery County	19436	
Gwynedd Heights	1	Montgomery County		
Gwynedd Square	1	Montgomery County	19446	
Gwynedd Valley	1	Montgomery County	19437	
