= Dominick Labino =

Scientist, inventor, artist and master craftsman in glass (1910–1987)

- Labino from his 1968 book "Visual Art in Glass"
- Born: December 4, 1910; Fairmount City, Pennsylvania
- Died: January 10, 1987 (aged 76); Grand Rapids, Ohio
- Occupations: Glass researcher and scientist, fine artist
- Known for: Research and development of industrial glass and glass art

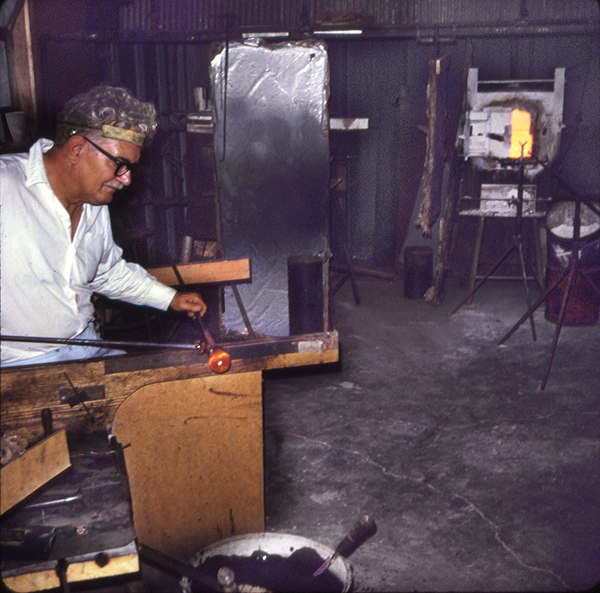
Labino working on a piece of glass at his workshop in October of 1971

Dominick Labino (December 4, 1910 – January 10, 1987) was an American internationally known scientist, inventor, artist and master craftsman in glass. Labino's art works in glass are in the permanent collections of more than 100 museums throughout the world. Labino held over 60 glass-oriented patents in the United States.

== Education and career ==
Dominick Labino was trained as an engineer at the Carnegie Institute of Technology and began his professional career at Owens-Illinois, Inc., a glass manufacturing plant in Clarion, Pennsylvania.

In 1944, Dominick left Owens-Illinois to pursue the fiber glass industry with long-time business partner and Executive VP of I-O, Randolph H Barnard. Barnard formed Glass Fibers, Inc. in Toledo, Labino was the head of Research and Development. In 1958, Johns-Manville acquired Glass Fibers, Inc., creating Johns-Manville's modern fiber glass division. Labino stayed on as Vice President and Director of Research and development until his retirement in 1965.

Labino continued to serve as a research consultant until 1975. Labino was an innovator in the processes and machines used in forming glass fibers. Three of his inventions employing fiberglass were used in the Gemini and Apollo spacecraft to insulate them against extreme temperatures.

According to art historian Martha Drexler Lynn, "Labino had a life-long love of tools, inventing and problem-solving which he coupled with a passion for artistic endeavors..." His interest in blowing glass began in the 1930s, when he ran the Owens-Illinois milk bottling plant. There he had a laboratory in which he created glass formulas. In 1940, his predecessor at the plant, Ben Alderson, showed Labino how to blow glass. Labino later blew glass as a hobby; at Johns-Manville he built a home glass furnace at which to pursue the craft. An early project was a glass paperweight that he created in 1958 for a friend's retirement. By 1960 he had melted a batch of glass and created a primitive blowpipe.

Labino and Harvey Littleton, with whom Labino would stage a ground-breaking glassblowing workshop at the Toledo Museum of Art in 1962, met during the time that Littleton was a ceramics instructor at the Toledo Museum of Art School of Design (1949 to 1951) and Labino was taking evening craft classes there.

Labino's interest in Studio glass grew out of his frustration with industry, according to Lynn:

"As he recalled, 'I had just had it in industry. I would say to myself, 'How many years will I have to stay here until I can do something that I don't have to get approved by twelve to fourteen people?'"

== Studio Glass Movement ==
In March, 1962 Harvey Littleton, then a ceramics instructor at the University of Wisconsin-Madison, held the first of two week-long glassblowing workshops in a storage shed on the grounds of the Toledo Museum of Art. He had presented the workshop idea to the museum's director, Otto Wittmann, who agreed to it perhaps, Littleton suggested, as a means to draw a broad public to the museum. An industrial glass town, Toledo was home to the Libbey Owens Ford Company, as well as Johns-Mansville, which had purchased Toledo's L.O.F. Glass Fibers company in 1958. Littleton enlisted Labino's help in the workshop for his knowledge of glassblowing's technical aspects. Labino initially advised Littleton about the type of fire bricks to use in the construction of the furnace for the workshop. Labino also donated the steel and burner for the furnace, while Littleton brought the bricks from his studio in Wisconsin. Thus the stage was set for the seminal event of the Studio Glass Movement. The workshop, which began on March 23, did not start out smoothly.

Labino's glassblowing workshop in 1968, with his chair and marvering board, annealing kiln (left), and glass furnaces (right).

The first glass batch did not melt properly, and the stoneware crucible that Littleton had made to hold the molten glass in the furnace broke apart in the intense heat. Labino suggested that they melt the glass directly in the furnace; he then directed the conversion of the pot furnace into a small day tank. Instead of trying to melt another load of glass batch, Labino re-charged the furnace with the low-melting formula #475 glass marbles that he had developed for Johns-Manville for the production of fiberglass. The marbles, which melted at a relatively low temperature, produced glass that was malleable enough to blow. This enabled the workshop to continue and, with the craft's technique demonstrated by two retired industrial glassblowers, Harvey Leafgreen and Jim Nelson, participants blew glass around the clock.

Littleton would go on to found the first fine art glass program at the University of Wisconsin–Madison. Here Labino provided further valuable assistance. When the University of Wisconsin-Madison accepted Littleton's proposal to create a graduate glassblowing program in its fine art department, it did so with the stipulation that funds from outside the university be provided to purchase the equipment. Labino arranged for Johns-Mansville to donate $1000 and 2,400 pounds of #475 glass marbles to the program. Littleton's students and fellow glass pioneers, Marvin Lipofsky and Dale Chihuly, respectively founded the glass program at the University of California at Berkeley in 1964 and initiated the glass program at the Rhode Island School of Design in 1969.

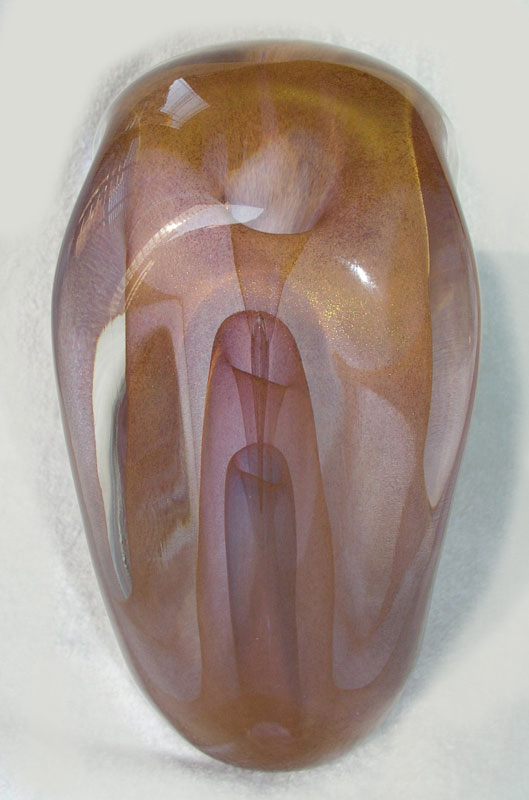
Labino called this particular vase "Break-Through Gold Veilings" from the Emergence Series. This vase is from the Smithsonian Institution's Renwick Gallery 1980 exhibit of Dominick Labino, along with other leaders of the Studio Art Glass Movement in the U.S. This vase is in a private collection in New York City.

In 1963 Labino set up his own glass studio on his farm near Grand Rapids, Ohio. He designed glass-blowing and finishing tools; built his own furnaces and annealing ovens; and began freehand blowing with molten glass. Through his research and development of new technologies, like the fusing of colors, he provided artists with the methods and tools to create glass as art in their own studios, no longer making it necessary to involve glass factories in their creative process.

Labino opened his studio under the auspices of the Toledo Museum of Art School of Design in 1966 and 1967 to present three workshops. His interest in the education of fine artists in glass-working materials and techniques was furthered by the publication of his book Visual Art in Glass (W.C. Brown Company, publishers) in 1967.

An important note: Labino always signed each of his art glass pieces "Labino," and dated with the month and year (for example: "5/69")

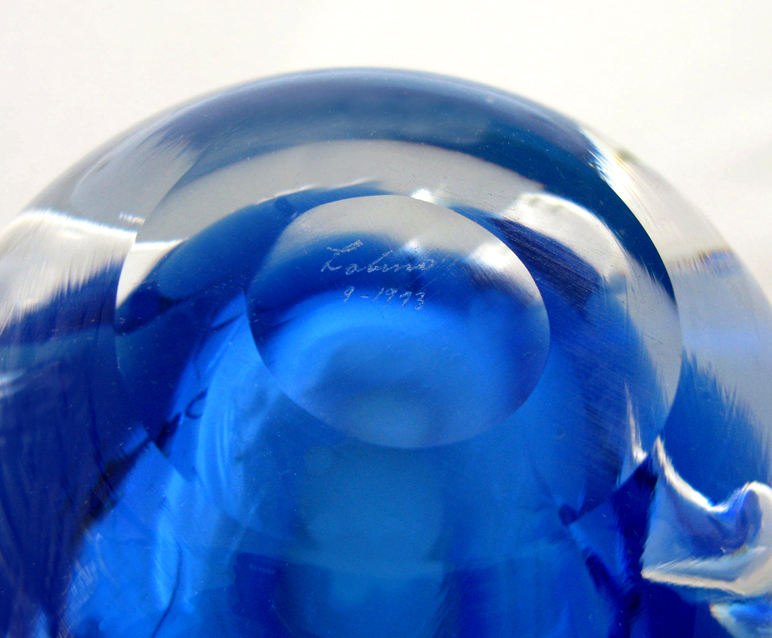
This is an example of Labino's signature that appears on all of his art glass pieces. The inscription in the glass reads "Labino" with the specific month and year that the piece was created by him. The vase is in a private collection in New York City.

== Honors and awards ==
Labino received an honorary doctorate from Bowling Green State University in 1970. In 1971 he received the Governor's Award for the Art, State of Ohio, and was presented with the first Ohio Art Council award for his contribution to the development of molten glass as a fine art form. Labino received the Toledo Glass and Ceramic Award in 1972, and was presented with the Rakow Award for Excellence in Glass by the Corning Museum of Glass in 1985. Labino received the Steuben Phoenix Award in 1977 for his contributions both to the production of industrial glass and to the use of glass in fine art.

== Exhibitions ==
Solo exhibitions of Labino's art work in glass include "Dominick Labino: A Half Century with Glass" at the Owens-Illinois Art Center in Toledo, Ohio, 1983; "Dominick Labino: Glass Retrospective" at Western Carolina University in Cullowhee, North Carolina, 1982 and "Dominick Labino: A Decade of Glass Craftsmanship, 1964–1969" at the Toledo Museum of Art, Toledo, Ohio, 1974.

== Collections ==
Some of the national and international museums that have collected Dominick Labino's art work in glass include: Kalamazoo Institute of Arts, Kalamazoo, Michigan; Toledo Museum of Art, Toledo, Ohio; Hudson Gallery, Sylvania, Ohio; Cleveland Museum of Art, Cleveland, Ohio; Art Institute of Chicago, Chicago, Illinois; Corning Museum of Glass, Corning, New York; Chrysler Museum of Art, Norfolk, Virginia; Fowler Museum, Los Angeles, California; Smithsonian Institution, Washington, D.C.; Victoria & Albert Museum, London, England; Museum Kunstpalast, Düsseldorf, Germany; National Glasmuseum, Leerdam, the Netherlands; Pilkington Glass Museum, England and Museum für Kunst und Gewerbe in Hamburg, Germany.

== Death ==
He died at his home in Grand Rapids, Ohio, on January 11, 1987, aged 76.
