= Isacks (surname) =

Isacks is a surname, and a variant of Isaacs (surname). Notable people with the surname include:

- Bryan Isacks (1936–2026), American geophysicist
- Herman Isacks op den Graeff (b. 1642), founder of Germantown, Pennsylvania
- Jacob C. Isacks (1767–1835), American politician
