= Germantown, Pennsylvania =

Germantown, Pennsylvania may refer to:

- Germantown, Adams County, Pennsylvania, an unincorporated area in Adams County, Pennsylvania
- Germantown, Cambria County, Pennsylvania, a place in Pennsylvania
- Germantown, Columbia County, Pennsylvania, a place in Pennsylvania
- Germantown, Franklin County, Pennsylvania
- Germantown, Pike County, Pennsylvania, a place in Pennsylvania
- Germantown, Philadelphia, a neighborhood in the northwest section of Philadelphia
- Germantown Township, Pennsylvania, a defunct township incorporated into Philadelphia

== See also ==
- Germansville, Pennsylvania
