= Good Intent (disambiguation) =

"Good Intent" is a 2011 song by Kimbra.

Good Intent may also refer to:

- Good Intent (album), a 2015 album by Press to Meco
- Good Intent, Kansas, an unincorporated community in Atchison County
- Good Intent, New Jersey, an unincorporated community in Gloucester County
- Good Intent, Pennsylvania, an unincorporated community in Washington County
