= Corbly Family massacre =

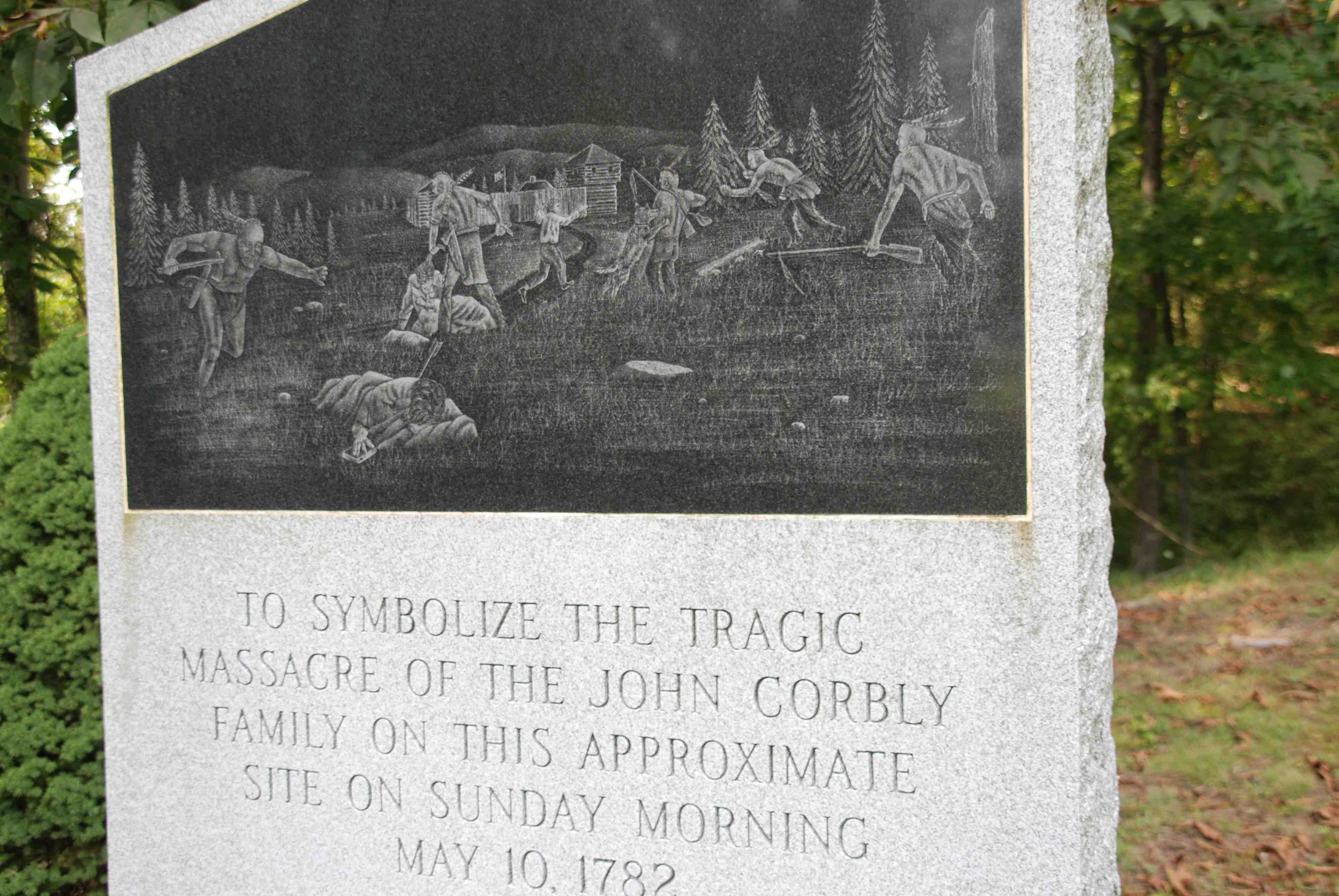
- Garard's Fort Cemetery
- Location: 39°48′58″N 80°01′35″W; Garards Fort, Pennsylvania
- Date: May 10, 1782
- Attack type: Mass murder
- Deaths: 4 killed

The Corbly Family massacre refers to the massacre of members of the family of the Rev. John Corbly by Native Americans on May 10, 1782.

The Corbly family lived one mile north of Garards Fort, in southwest Pennsylvania at the John Corbley Farm. The massacre occurred on Sunday morning, May 10, 1782, as the Corbly family traveled on foot to their place of worship. The Corbly family had left their home and were on their way to worship at a place where Reverend John Corbly was to preach. When Corbly discovered that the Bible, which he thought was in Mrs. Corbly's care, had been left at home, he returned to get it and then followed his family, meditating upon the sermon he was to preach.

A party of Native Americans were on Indian Point, an elevation of land from which they could see John Corbly's cabin. The Natives descended the hill, crossed Whitely creek and filed up a ravine to the place, about forty-nine rods north of the present John Corbly Memorial Baptist Church, where the helpless family was massacred. Two of Corbly's daughters, Delilah and Elizabeth, lived after scalpings. Mrs. Corbly and the three remaining children were killed.

Because of the rise of ground the fort was out of view of the massacre, but was within hearing distance. The screams of the Corbly family were heard there and in a few minutes men on horseback rushed from the fort to give help.

The John Corbly Memorial Baptist Church was built in 1862. A plaque erected by the Daughters of the American Revolution (DAR) in 1923 and set in a boulder reads: "Fort Garard built about 1774". The Corbly massacre took place about 279 yards north on May 10, 1782. A family reunion of John Corbly descendants takes place every year on the last Sunday in June, at the John Corbly Memorial Baptist Church in Garards Fort, PA. A historic review follows the 9:30 AM church service at 11:00 AM with a potluck dinner afterwards.

The family lived one mile north of Garards Fort in Long's Run, a tributary emptying into Whiteley Creek. The Monongahela River was five miles east of their cabin and Old Redstone Fort was 30 miles north. The Indians were on Lookout Point, west of the Corbly cabin. The Goshen Baptist Church was established in 1771 and was renamed the Reverend John Corbly Memorial Baptist Church in 1907. Delilah lived to age 65 and reared ten children with Levi Martin. Elizabeth died at age 21, a few days before she was to marry Isaiah Morris of Garards Fort. Only John Jr escaped unharmed.

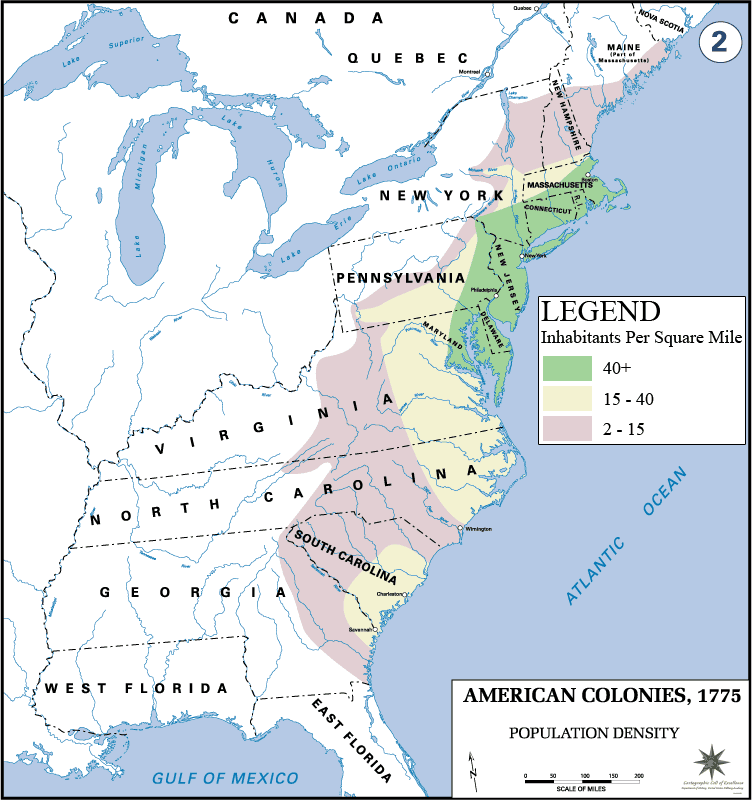
Population density in the American Colonies in 1775

== See also ==
- History of Pennsylvania
- PA historical markers in Greene County
- American Revolution
- Baptists in the United States
