= White Covered Bridge =

- U.S. National Register of Historic Places
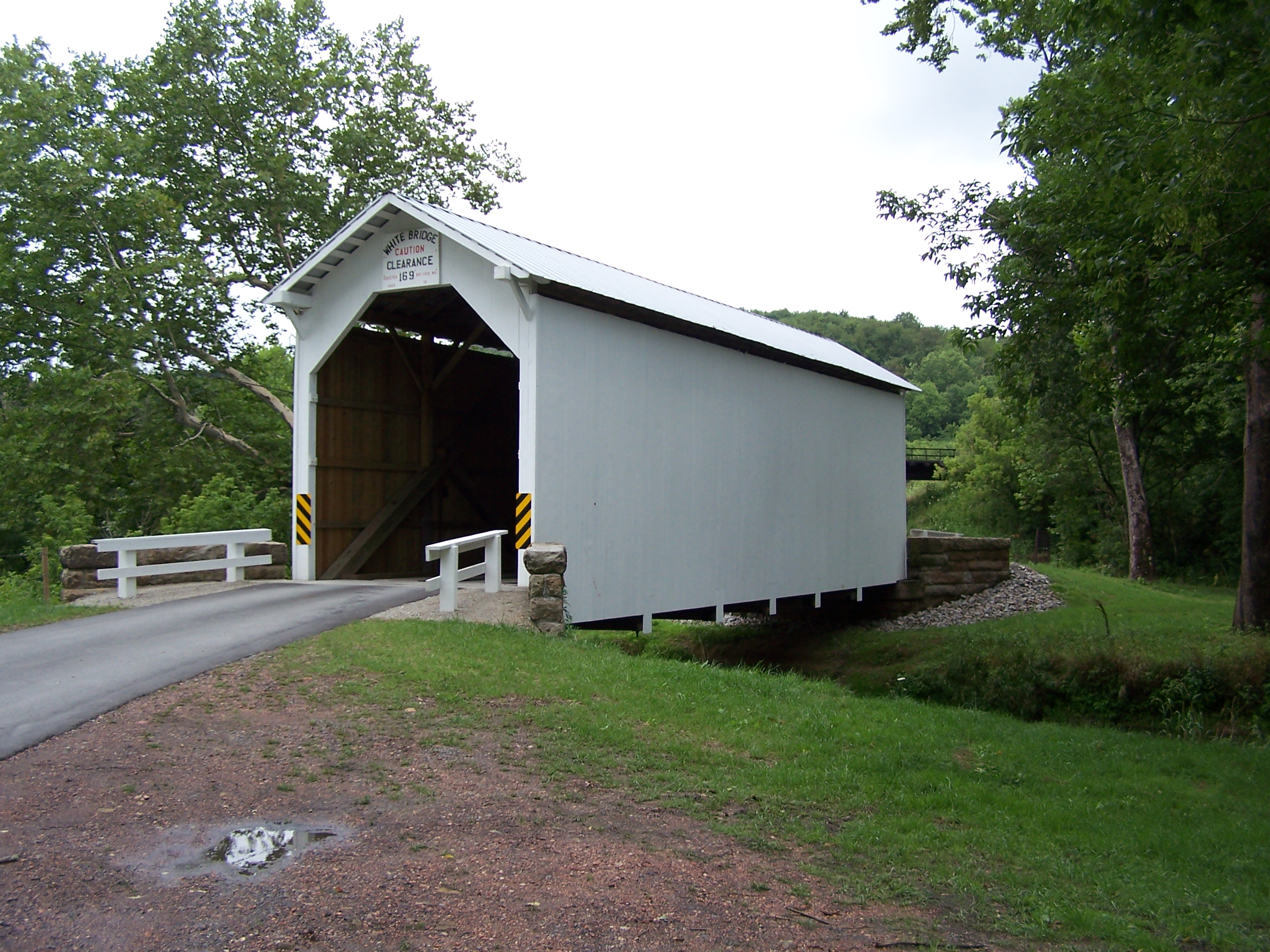
- White Covered Bridge, July 2009

- Location within Pennsylvania Location within the United States
- Location: Roberts Run Road, west of Garards Fort at the crossing of Whiteley Creek, Greene Township, Pennsylvania
- Coordinates: 39°48′23.5″N 80°3′39″W
- Area: 0.1 acres (0.040 ha)
- Architectural style: Queenpost truss
- MPS: Covered Bridges of Washington and Greene Counties TR
- NRHP reference No.: 79003822
- Added to NRHP: June 22, 1979

White Covered Bridge is a historic wooden covered bridge located at Greene Township in Greene County, Pennsylvania. It is a 66.5-foot-long (20.3 m), Queenpost truss bridge with a gable roof, constructed in 1919. It crosses Whiteley Creek. As of October 1978, it was one of nine historic covered bridges in Greene County.

It was listed on the National Register of Historic Places in 1979.
