= Neils Red Covered Bridge =

- Formerly listed on the U.S. National Register of Historic Places
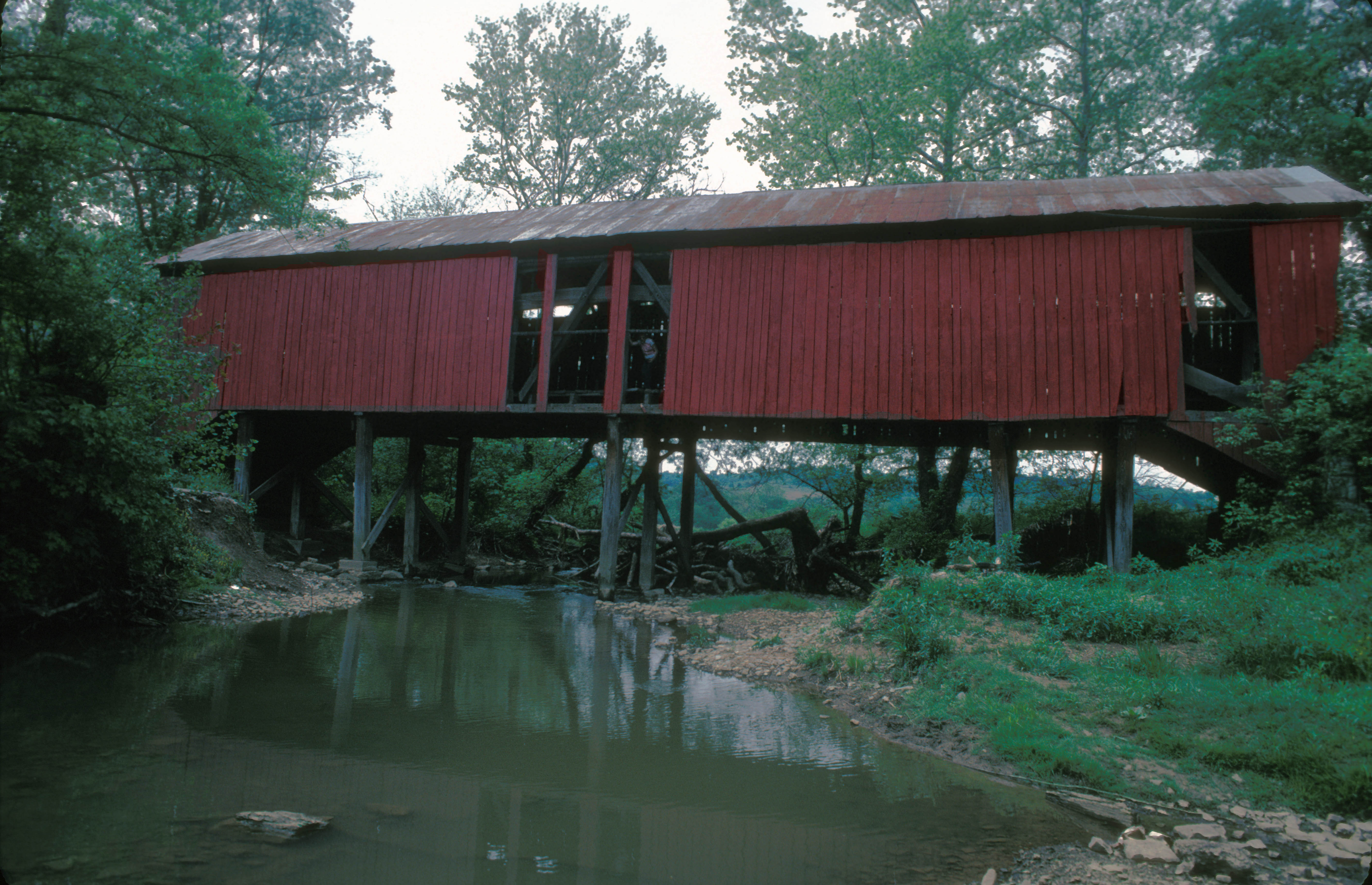
- The bridge in 1970

- Location within Pennsylvania Location within the United States
- Location: East of Garards Fort at the crossing of Whiteley Creek, Greene Township, Pennsylvania
- Coordinates: 39°48′43″N 80°0′50″W
- Area: 0.1 acres (0.040 ha)
- Architectural style: Burr arch
- MPS: Covered Bridges of Washington and Greene Counties TR
- NRHP reference No.: 79003817

Significant dates
- Added to NRHP: June 22, 1979
- Removed from NRHP: March 22, 2018

The Neils Red Covered Bridge was an historic wooden covered bridge that was located in Greene Township in Greene County, Pennsylvania, United States.

It was listed on the National Register of Historic Places in 1979. It was destroyed in an arson fire on June 19, 1990, and was delisted from the National Register in 2018.

== History and architectural features ==
This historic structure was an 86-foot-long (26 m), Burr Truss bridge with a tin covered gable roof, Built in 1900, it crossed Whiteley Creek. As of October 1978, it was one of nine historic covered bridges that existed in Greene County.
