= List of Pennsylvania state historical markers in Greene County =

Location of Greene County in Pennsylvania

This is a list of the Pennsylvania state historical markers in Greene County.

This is intended to be a complete list of the official state historical markers placed in Greene County, Pennsylvania by the Pennsylvania Historical and Museum Commission (PHMC). The locations of the historical markers, as well as the latitude and longitude coordinates as provided by the PHMC's database, are included below when available. There are 11 historical markers located in Greene County.

== Historical markers ==
Marker title	Image	Date dedicated	Location	Marker type	Topics
Fort Jackson		February 23, 1955	East High Street at Woodland Avenue, Waynesburg (MISSING)	Roadside	American Revolution, Forts, Military
Fort Swan		n/a	PA 88, south of Dry Tavern (MISSING)	Roadside	Forts, Military
Garard's Fort		May 23, 1958	Garard's Fort Road (SR 2011), Garard's Fort; 39.812467°N 80.013353°W	Roadside	American Revolution, Forts, Military, Native American
Greene Academy		May 22, 1953	North Eighty-Eight Road (PA 88) & West Greene Street, Carmichaels; 39.897333°N 79.977067°W	City	Education
Greene County		May 3, 1982	County Courthouse, High Street, Waynesburg; 39.89635°N 80.18678°W	City	Government & Politics, Government & Politics 18th Century
Monongahela College		May 8, 1960	Jefferson Road (PA 188) & Pine Street, Jefferson; 39.930433°N 80.059733°W	Roadside	Education, Religion
Old Glassworks		March 28, 1955	SR 2014, Greensboro; 39.801804°N 79.914111°W	Roadside	Business & Industry, Glass
Rev. John Corbley		November 15, 1994	Garard's Fort Road (SR 2011) & John Corbley Road, Garards Fort; 39.814017°N 80.022250°W	Roadside	Government & Politics, Government & Politics 18th Century, Military, Religion, Whiskey Rebellion
Ryerson's Blockhouse		October 17, 1960	Wind Ridge Playground, Roy Furman Highway (PA 21), Wind Ridge; 39.912983°N 80.435117°W	Roadside	Native American
Waynesburg College		January 6, 1949	Monument Park, North Morris Street (US 19) at West College Street, Waynesburg; 39.89905°N 80.18845°W	Roadside	Education, Religion
Waynesburg College		January 6, 1949	North Richhill Street between West College & West Wayne Streets, Waynesburg; 39.898733°N 80.19002°W	Roadside	Education, Religion

== See also ==
- List of Pennsylvania state historical markers
- National Register of Historic Places listings in Greene County, Pennsylvania
