= John Corbley Farm =

Historic house in Pennsylvania, United States

- John Corbly Farm
- U.S. National Register of Historic Places
- Pennsylvania state historical marker
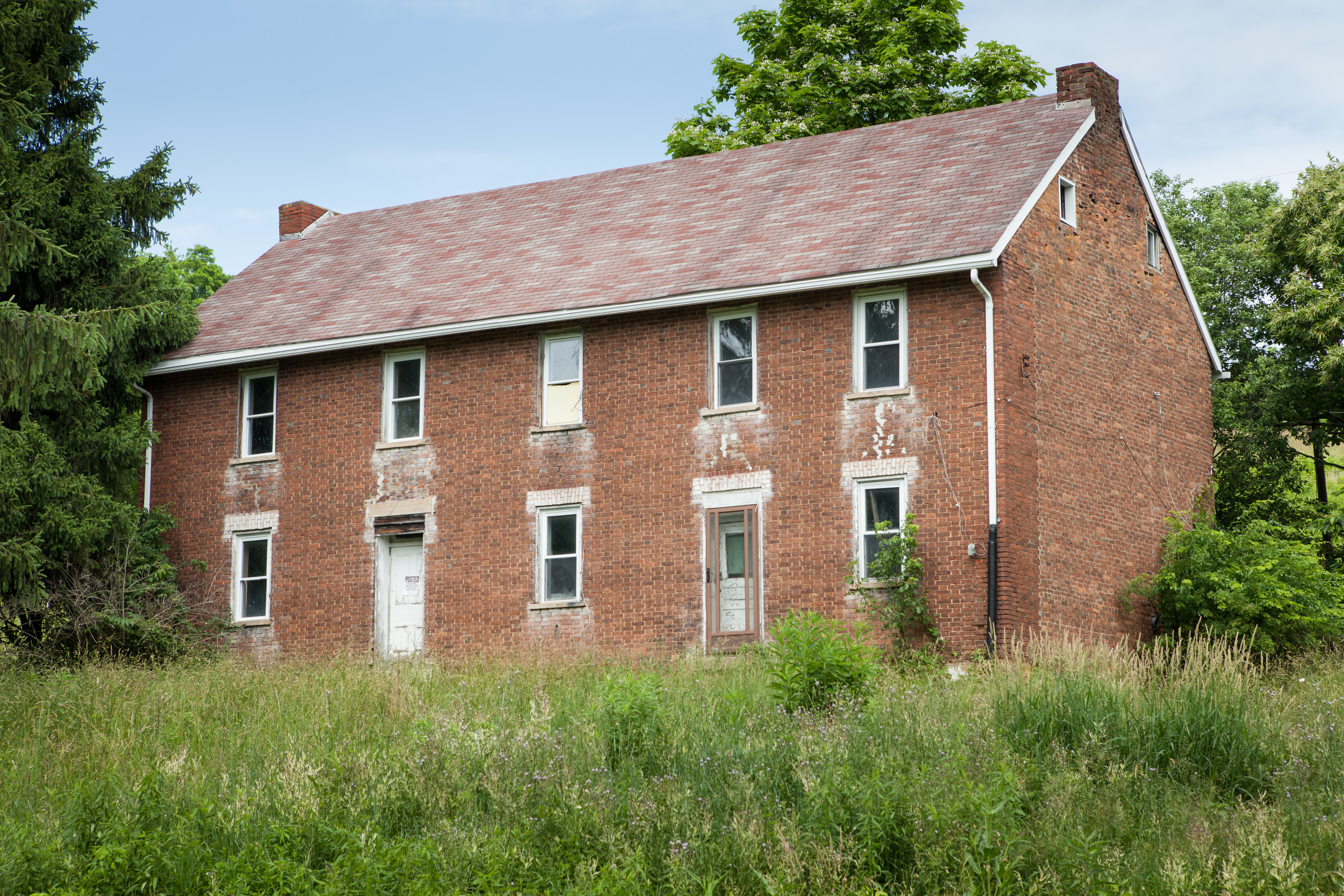
- The front and southern side, June 2014

- Location within Pennsylvania Location within the United States
- Location: North of Garards Fort, Greene Township, Pennsylvania
- Coordinates: 39°49′32″N 80°1′33″W
- Area: 0.8 acres (0.32 ha)
- Built: c. 1796
- NRHP reference No.: 84003380

Significant dates
- Added to NRHP: May 3, 1984
- Designated PHMC: November 15, 1994

The John Corbley Farm, also known as Slave Gallant, is an historic home in Greene Township in Greene County, Pennsylvania, United States.

It was listed on the National Register of Historic Places in 1984.

== History and architectural features ==
Built circa 1796 as a two-story, five-bay, brick dwelling that sits on a stone foundation, this historic structure has a gable roof. Its builder, the Rev. John Corbly (1733–1803), was a founder of the local Baptist church and was also associated with the Whiskey Rebellion. In 1782, his family was killed during the Corbly Family massacre. The farm name of 'Slave Gallant' derived from Slieve Gallion in Ireland, which was nearby where John Corbley was born and raised before emigrating to Pennsylvania.
