= Greene Township, Greene County, Pennsylvania =

Township in Pennsylvania, US

Coordinates: 39°50′00″N 79°59′29″W

- Township
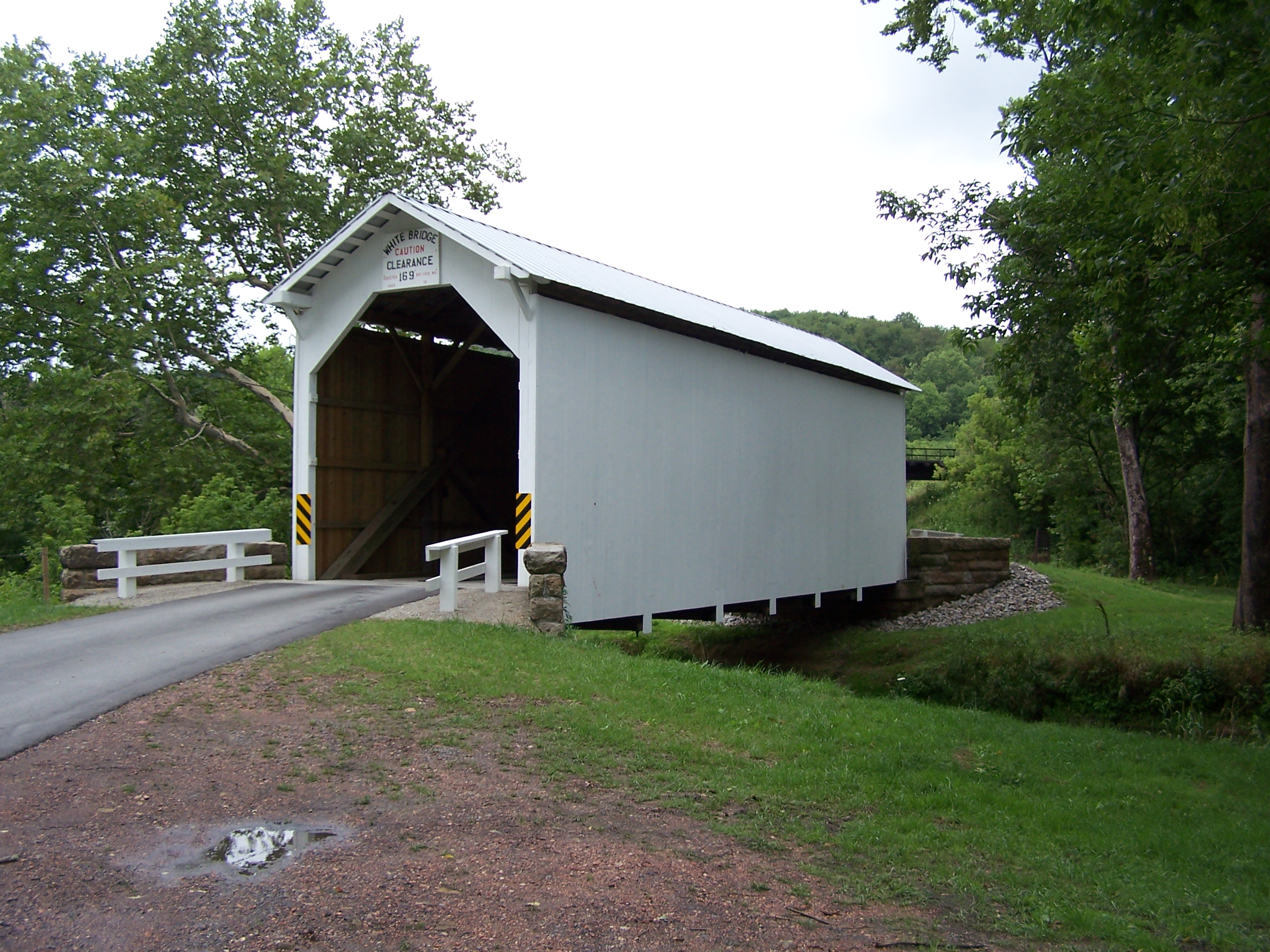
- White Covered Bridge (1919); National Register of Historic Places

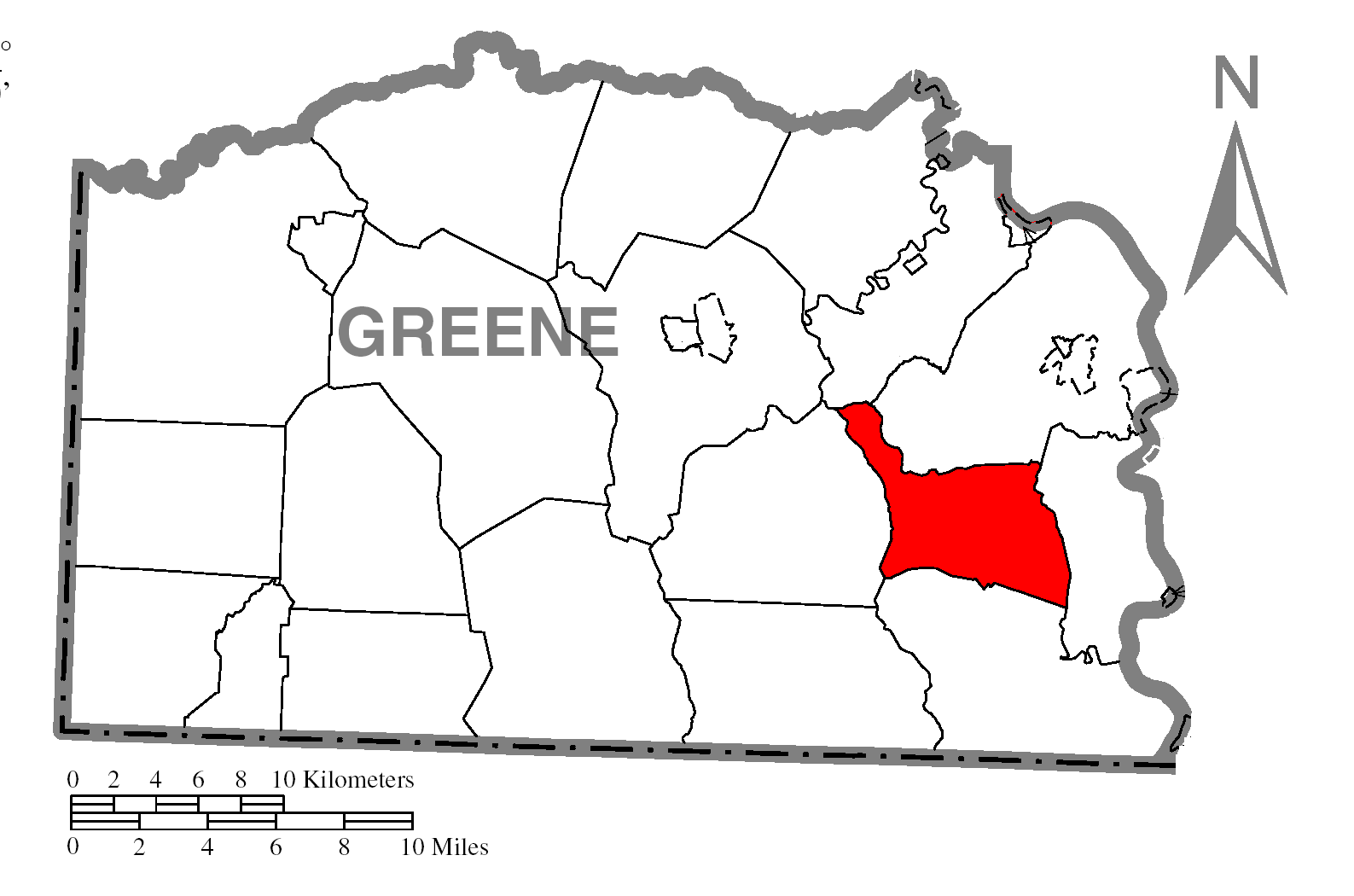
- Location of Greene Township in Greene County

- Location of Greene County in Pennsylvania
- Country: United States
- State: Pennsylvania
- County: Greene

Area
  - Total: 18.51 sq mi (47.95 km^{2})
  - Land: 18.51 sq mi (47.94 km^{2})
  - Water: 0.0039 sq mi (0.01 km^{2})

Population (2020)
  - Total: 398
  - Estimate (2023): 391
  - Density: 22.5/sq mi (8.68/km^{2})
- Time zone: UTC-4 (EST)
  - Summer (DST): UTC-5 (EDT)
- Area code: 724
- FIPS code: 42-059-30952

Greene Township is a township in Greene County, Pennsylvania, United States. The population was 398 at the 2020 census.

== History ==
The John Corbley Farm, Neils Red Covered Bridge, and White Covered Bridge are listed on the National Register of Historic Places.

== Geography ==
Greene Township is in eastern Greene County, southeast of Waynesburg, the county seat. The township is primarily drained by Whiteley Creek, an east-flowing tributary of the Monongahela River. Unincorporated communities in the township include Willow Tree, Headlee Heights, Garards Fort, and Fordyce. According to the United States Census Bureau, the township has a total area of 18.5 square miles (47.9 km^{2}), of which 0.0039 square miles (0.01 km^{2}), or 0.02%, is water.

== Demographics ==
Historical population
Census	Pop.	Note	%±
2000	445		—
2010	445		0.0%
2020	398		−10.6%
2025 (est.)	391		−1.8%
U.S. Decennial Census

As of the census of 2010 there were 445 people, 184 households, and 131 families residing in the township. The population density was 23.9 people per square mile (9.3/km^{2}). There were 203 housing units at an average density of 11.0/sq mi (4.2/km^{2}). The racial makeup of the township was 98.7% White, 0.2% African American, 0.2% Native American, 0.0% Asian, 0.4% some other race, and 0.4% from two or more races. Hispanic or Latino of any race were 0.9% of the population.

There were 184 households, out of which 25.0% had children under the age of 18 living with them, 60.3% were headed by married couples living together, 7.6% had a female householder with no husband present, and 28.8% were non-families. 23.4% of all households were made up of individuals, and 9.8% were someone living alone who was 65 years of age or older. The average household size was 2.42, and the average family size was 2.82.

In the township the population was spread out, with 20.7% under the age of 18, 6.4% from 18 to 24, 24.7% from 25 to 44, 34.2% from 45 to 64, and 14.2% who were 65 years of age or older. The median age was 43.0 years. For every 100 females, there were 100.5 males. For every 100 females age 18 and over, there were 97.2 males.

For the period 2011–2015, the estimated median annual income for a household in the township was $52,344, and the median income for a family was $60,556. The per capita income for the township was $23,847. About 4.8% of families and 7.5% of the population were below the poverty line, including 7.1% of those under age 18 and 8.7% of those age 65 or over.
