= Gibbon Glade, Pennsylvania =

Unincorporated community in Pennsylvania, US

- Unincorporated community
- Location within Pennsylvania
- Coordinates: 39°44′23″N 79°35′40″W
- Country: United States
- State: Pennsylvania
- County: Fayette
- Elevation: 1,680 ft (510 m)
- Time zone: UTC-5 (Eastern (EST))
  - Summer (DST): UTC-4 (EDT)
- ZIP code: 15440
- Area codes: 724, 878
- GNIS feature ID: 1175582

Gibbon Glade is an unincorporated community in Fayette County, Pennsylvania, United States. The community is 12.8 miles (20.6 km) south-southeast of Uniontown. Gibbon Glade has a post office, with ZIP code 15440, which opened on February 8, 1870.
