= Garards Fort, Pennsylvania =

Unincorporated community in Pennsylvania, US

- Unincorporated community
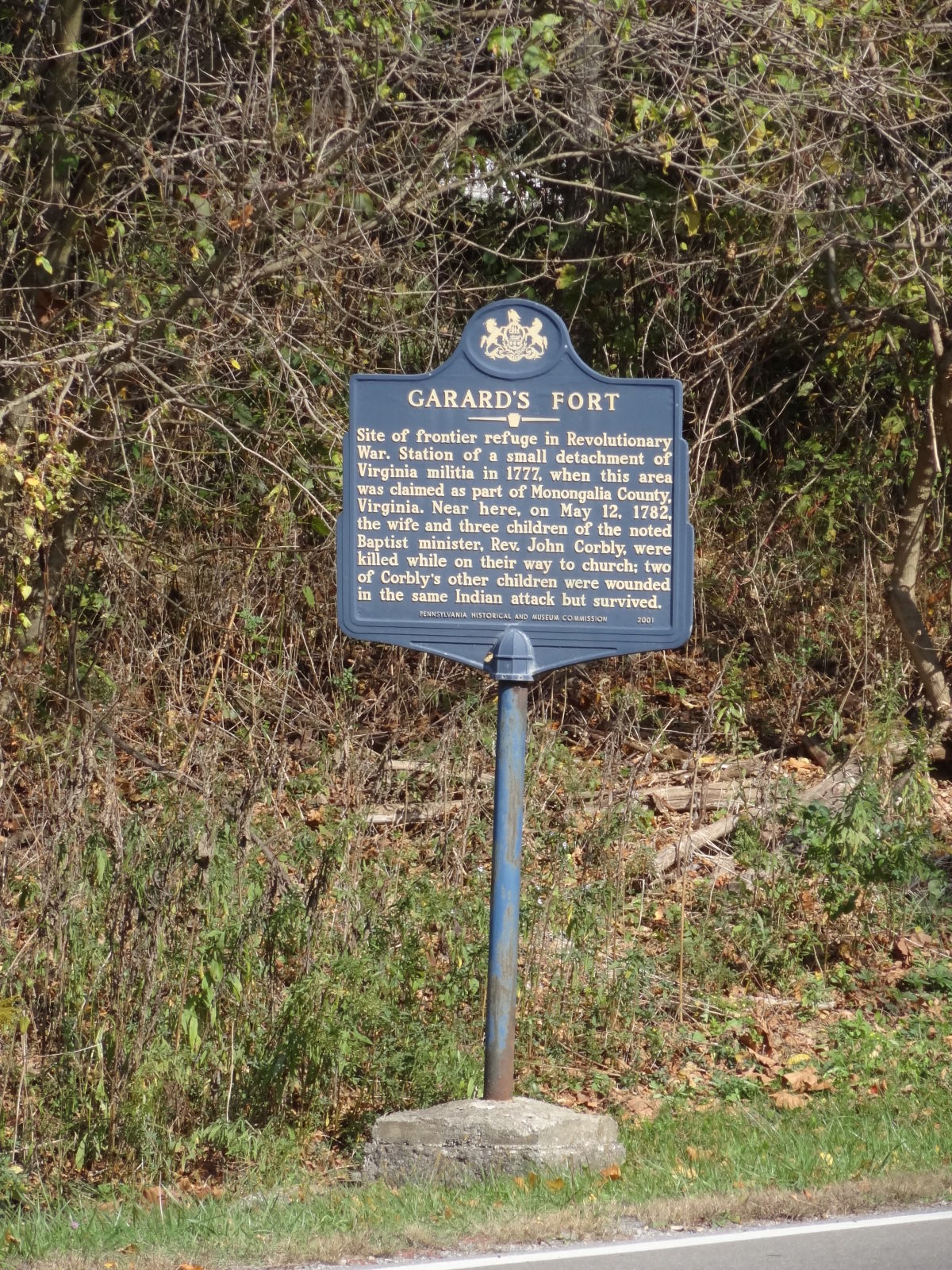
- Garard's Fort historical marker

- Location within Pennsylvania
- Coordinates: 39°48′57″N 80°01′35″W
- Country: United States
- State: Pennsylvania
- County: Greene
- Elevation: 974 ft (297 m)
- Time zone: UTC-5 (Eastern (EST))
  - Summer (DST): UTC-4 (EDT)
- ZIP code: 15334
- Area codes: 724, 878
- GNIS feature ID: 1175428

Garards Fort is an unincorporated community in Greene County, Pennsylvania, United States. The community is 10 miles (16 km) southeast of Waynesburg. Garards Fort has a post office, with ZIP code 15334. Garards Fort is known for the Revolutionary era Corbly Family massacre.
