= Frugality, Pennsylvania =

Unincorporated community in Pennsylvania, U.S.

Coordinates: 40°39′11″N 78°29′19″W

Frugality is a former town in Cambria County, in the U.S. state of Pennsylvania. The GNIS classifies it as a populated place.

== History ==
A post office called Frugality was in operation from 1887 until 1935. The name was selected as a sign of frugality of the residents.
