= Gatchellville, Pennsylvania =

Unincorporated area in Pennsylvania, US

- Unincorporated community
- Location within Pennsylvania
- Coordinates: 39°46′08″N 76°28′01″W
- Country: United States
- State: Pennsylvania
- County: York
- Elevation: 715 ft (218 m)
- Time zone: UTC-5 (Eastern (EST))
  - Summer (DST): UTC-4 (EDT)
- Area code: 717
- GNIS feature ID: 1203655

Gatchellville is an unincorporated community in York County, Pennsylvania, United States.

Maize Quest is the Largest Collection of People-sized Mazes in the World started by Hugh McPherson in 1997.
