= Fauncetown, Pennsylvania =

Unincorporated community in Pennsylvania, US

- Unincorporated community
- Location within Pennsylvania Location within the United States
- Coordinates: 41°37′09″N 79°51′25″W
- Country: United States
- State: Pennsylvania
- County: Crawford
- Elevation: 1,329 ft (405 m)
- Time zone: UTC-5 (Eastern (EST))
  - Summer (DST): UTC-4 (EDT)
- Area code: 814
- GNIS feature ID: 1203558

Fauncetown is an unincorporated community in Crawford County, Pennsylvania, United States.
