= Fulmor, Pennsylvania =

Unincorporated community in Pennsylvania, US

Fulmor, Pennsylvania Fulmor Heights
- Unincorporated community
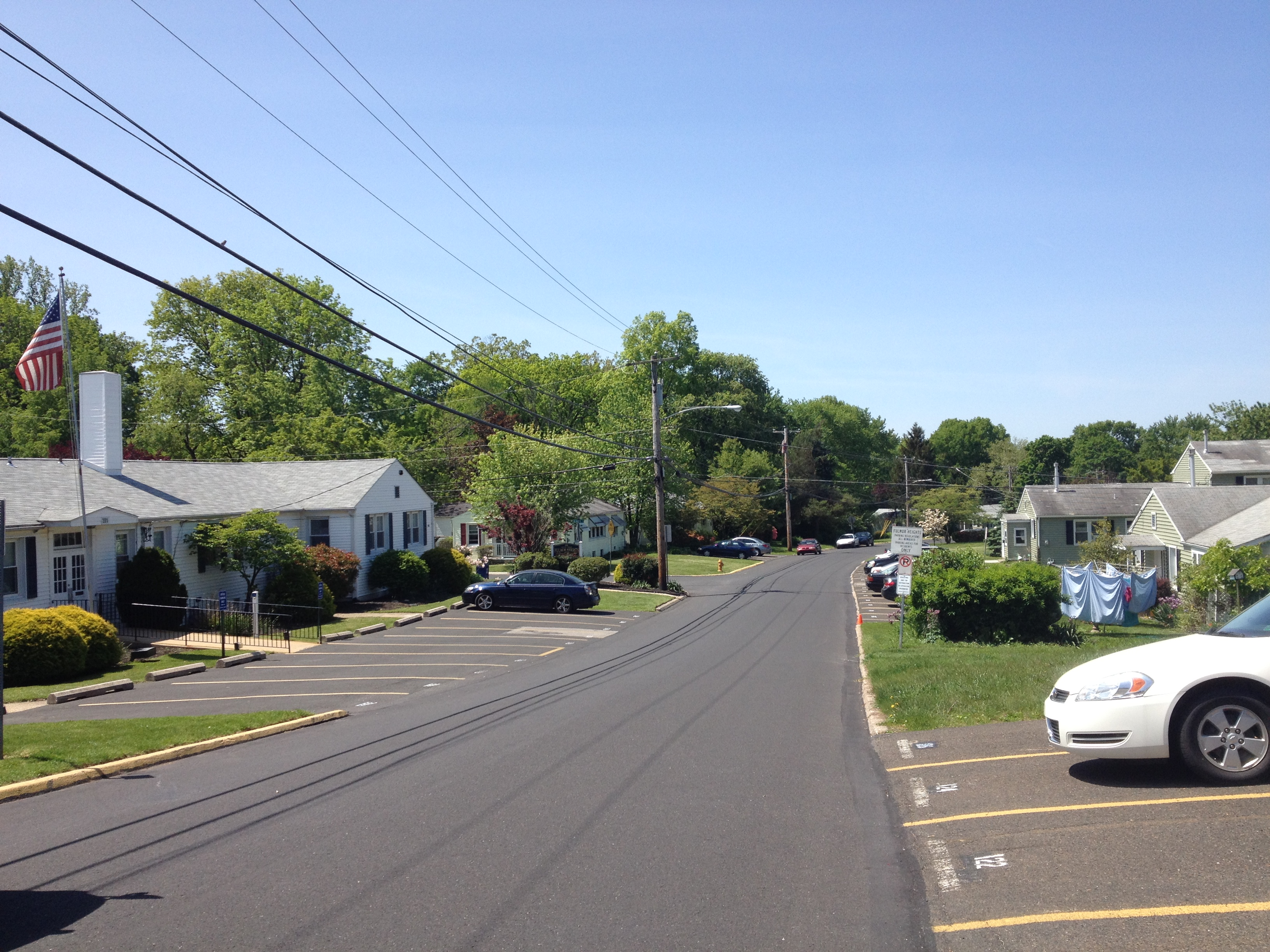
- Fitch Road in Fulmor Heights

- Location within Pennsylvania Location within the United States
- Coordinates: 40°09′56″N 75°06′17″W
- Country: United States
- State: Pennsylvania
- County: Montgomery
- Township: Upper Moreland
- Elevation: 190 ft (58 m)
- Time zone: UTC-5 (Eastern (EST))
  - Summer (DST): UTC-4 (EDT)
- ZIP code: 19040
- Area codes: 215, 267 and 445
- GNIS feature ID: 1192496

Fulmor (also known as Fulmor Heights) is an unincorporated community in Upper Moreland Township in Montgomery County, Pennsylvania, United States. Fulmor is located at the intersection of Byberry Road and Warminster Road east of Hatboro. Fulmor uses the Hatboro ZIP code of 19040. The Fulmor Heights residential neighborhood is 59.74 acres and is governed by a housing cooperative known as the Fulmor Heights Home Ownership Association. The neighborhood contains a deli, beauty salon, social club, and gathering hall.

The land on which Fulmor Heights was built was bought in 1940 by the Public Housing Authority, who intended to build housing for civilian defense workers who worked in nearby factories. In 1947, 300 residents bought the neighborhood from the government and organized the housing cooperative.

The community was formerly served by the Fulmor station along SEPTA Regional Rail's Warminster Line, which closed in 1996. The nearest train station to Fulmor is the Hatboro station on the Warminster Line.
