= Gnatstown, Pennsylvania =

Unincorporated area in Pennsylvania, US

Gnatstown
- Unincorporated community
- Location within the state of Pennsylvania
- Coordinates: 39°52′3″N 76°55′44″W
- Country: United States
- State: Pennsylvania
- County: York
- Elevation: 761 ft (232 m)
- Time zone: UTC-5 (Eastern (EST))
  - Summer (DST): UTC-4 (EDT)
- GNIS feature ID: 1203692

Gnatstown is an unincorporated community in York County, Pennsylvania, United States.

In September 2023 the community made the news when an asteroid that was estimated to be six inches across and that had travelled 55 miles through the Earth's atmosphere broke up just over Gnatstown.
