= Forbes Road, Pennsylvania =

Unincorporated community in Pennsylvania, US

- Unincorporated community
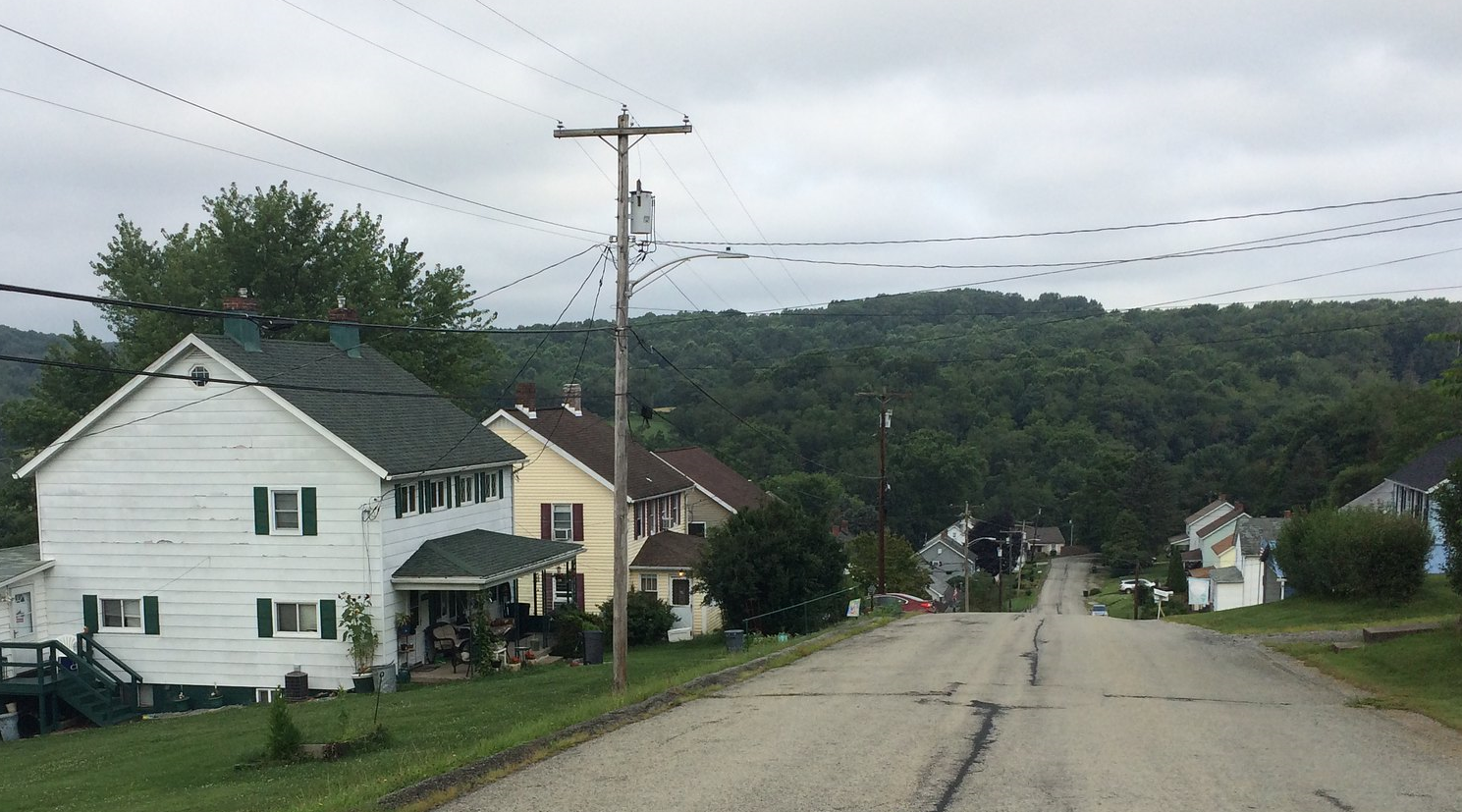
- Houses on Keaggy Avenue

- Location within Pennsylvania
- Coordinates: 40°21′14″N 79°31′18″W
- Country: United States
- State: Pennsylvania
- County: Westmoreland
- Elevation: 1,096 ft (334 m)
- Time zone: UTC-5 (Eastern (EST))
  - Summer (DST): UTC-4 (EDT)
- ZIP code: 15633
- Area code: 724
- GNIS feature ID: 1174946

Forbes Road is an unincorporated community in Westmoreland County, Pennsylvania, United States. The community is located along Pennsylvania Route 819, 3.7 miles (6.0 km) north of Greensburg. Forbes Road has a post office with ZIP code 15633, which opened on July 1, 1903.

== History ==
Jamison Coal & Coke Company opened a shaft-entry coal mine at Forbes Road in 1900. Known as Jamison No. 3 Mine, its production peaked in 1910, when the facility produced nearly 600,000 tons of coal and employed over 400 people. Jamison ceased operations in Forbes Road in the 1950s. Several buildings and other remains that were part of the mining complex are visible along Hugus Street as of July 2019.

== Gallery ==
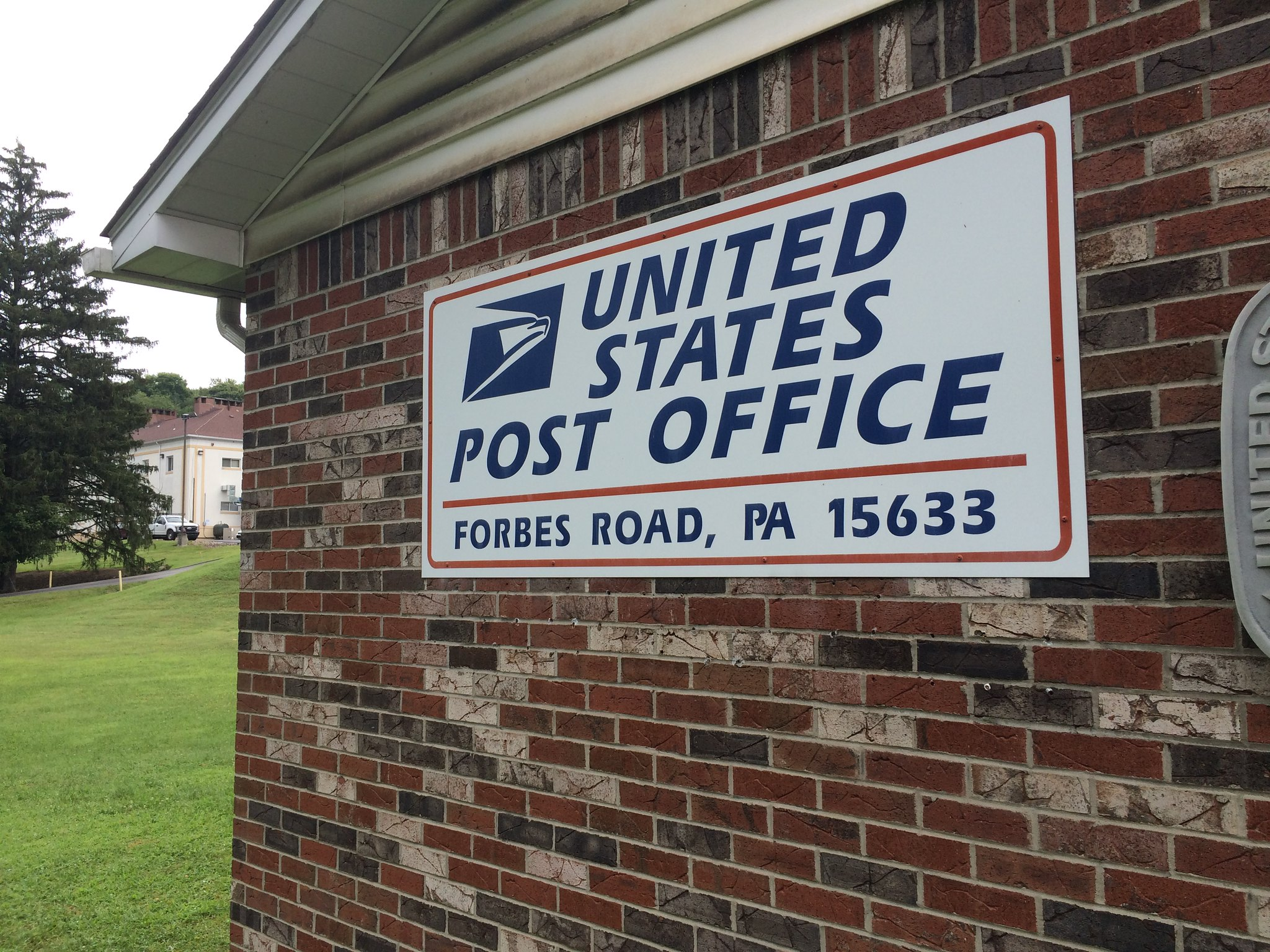
Zip code 15633

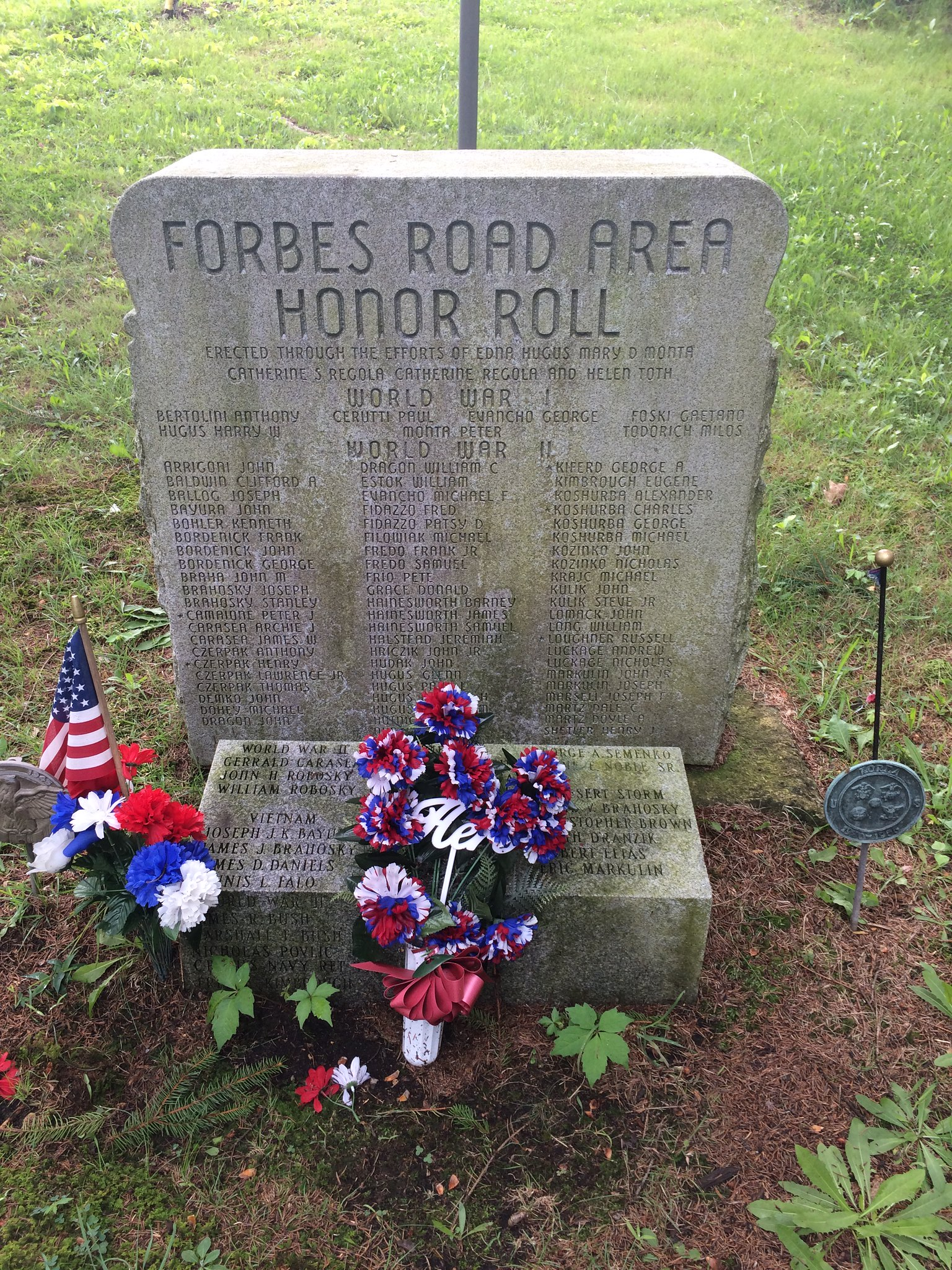
War memorial

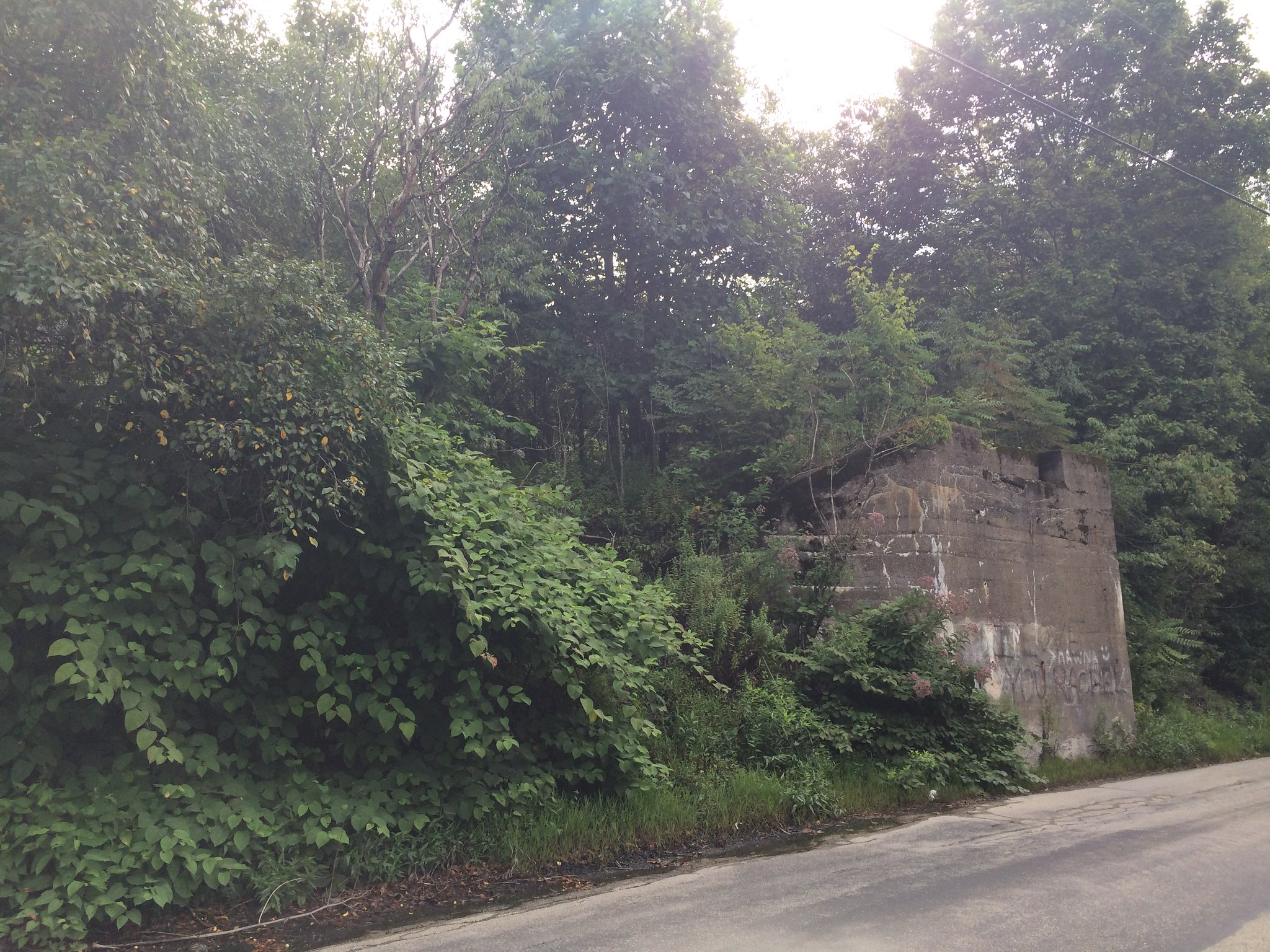
Remains of mining activity
