= Granville Summit, Pennsylvania =

Unincorporated community in Pennsylvania, US

- Unincorporated community
- Location within Pennsylvania
- Coordinates: 41°43′04″N 76°46′45″W
- Country: United States
- State: Pennsylvania
- County: Bradford
- Elevation: 1,348 ft (411 m)
- Time zone: UTC-5 (Eastern (EST))
  - Summer (DST): UTC-4 (EDT)
- ZIP code: 16926
- Area codes: 272 & 570
- GNIS feature ID: 1175974

Granville Summit is an unincorporated community in Granville Township, Bradford County, Pennsylvania, United States. The community is located along Pennsylvania Route 514, 4.8 miles (7.7 km) south of Troy. Granville Summit has a post office with ZIP code 16926.
