= Fuhrmans Mill, Pennsylvania =

Unincorporated community in Pennsylvania, U.S.

Coordinates: 39°45′29″N 76°55′26″W

Fuhrmans Mill is an unincorporated community in York County, Pennsylvania, United States.
