= Germantown, Franklin County, Pennsylvania =

Unincorporated community in Pennsylvania, U.S.

Coordinates: 39°55′14″N 77°32′44″W

Germantown is an unincorporated community in Franklin County, in the U.S. state of Pennsylvania.

== History ==
In 1878, Germantown had approximately 50 inhabitants.
