= Fairmount City, Pennsylvania =

Unincorporated community in Pennsylvania, US

- Unincorporated community
- Location within Pennsylvania
- Coordinates: 41°00′29″N 79°18′47″W
- Country: United States
- State: Pennsylvania
- County: Clarion
- Township: Redbank
- Elevation: 1,079 ft (329 m)
- Time zone: UTC-5 (Eastern (EST))
  - Summer (DST): UTC-4 (EDT)
- ZIP code: 16224
- Area code: 814
- GNIS feature ID: 1192441

Fairmount City (also known as Fairmont City) is an unincorporated community in Clarion County, Pennsylvania, United States. The community is located on Redbank Creek and Pennsylvania Route 28, immediately upstream of New Bethlehem. Fairmount City has a post office with ZIP code 16224.
