= Good Intent, Pennsylvania =

Unincorporated community in Pennsylvania, US

Good Intent
- Unincorporated community
- Location within the state of Pennsylvania Good Intent (the United States)
- Coordinates: 40°2′13″N 80°26′43″W
- Country: United States
- State: Pennsylvania
- County: Washington
- Elevation: 1,043 ft (318 m)
- Time zone: UTC-5 (Eastern (EST))
  - Summer (DST): UTC-4 (EDT)
- GNIS feature ID: 1175795

Good Intent is an unincorporated community in Washington County, Pennsylvania, United States.

== Location ==
Good Intent is located in West Finley Township in Southwestern Washington County, which is itself in Southwestern Pennsylvania. The community sits where Hutchison Road and Robinson Run Road intersect with State Road 3025, also known as Good Intent Road.

== History ==
In 1795, Edward Tighlman bought 30,000 acres (12,000 ha) from Robert Morris of Philadelphia. This land was laid out into 75 tracts. It is presumed this is when Good Intent received its name. In the early 1800s a mill was built at Good Intent by Robert Wolf, using power provided by Wheeling Creek. Some time in the mid-19th century a post office was established, the original postmaster being John Ensel. This post office operated at least until the early 1900s. In 1850 the area was served by two doctors and four nurses based in Good Intent. A general store opened in 1845, was operated by M. J. Flynn in the early 20th century, and closed in the mid-20th century. By 1882 the community boasted several businesses, including two blacksmith shops and a tannery. Oil production was known in the area by 1888. In the mid-1900s the community had a church. Several business including a barbershop and a blacksmith shop still operated in Good Intent at this time, although by 2010 the community consisted of only around 10 houses.

== Education ==
A school was established in Good Intent in the 19th century, and it operated until the mid-20th century.

== Economy ==
Employment centers around coal production and various mills in the area.
