= List of Pennsylvania state parks =

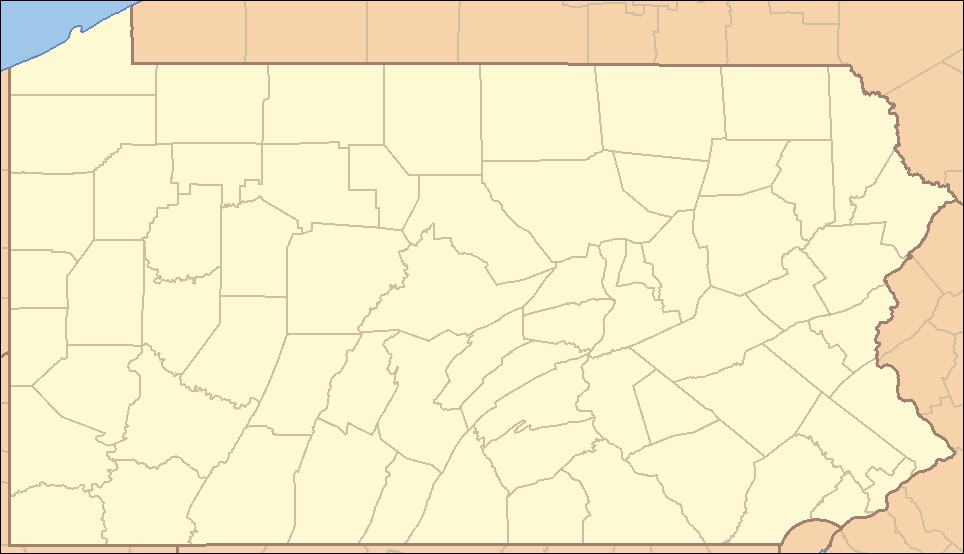
Map of state parks in Pennsylvania
(Each dot is linked to the corresponding park article)

As of 2026, there are 125 state parks in the U.S. state of Pennsylvania. The Pennsylvania Bureau of State Parks, a division of the Pennsylvania Department of Conservation and Natural Resources (DCNR), is the governing body for all these parks, and directly operates the majority of them. The remaining parks are operated in cooperation with other public and private organizations.^{[a]}

The first Pennsylvania state park, at Valley Forge, opened in 1893 and was given to the National Park Service (NPS) for the United States Bicentennial in 1976. There are a total of seventeen former Pennsylvania state parks: four former parks have been transferred to the NPS, four to the Pennsylvania Historical Museum Commission, two to the U.S. Army Corps of Engineers, one to both the Corps and the Pennsylvania Game Commission, five to the Pennsylvania Bureau of Forestry, and one has ceased to exist. Nine current and two former state parks have had major name changes or have been known under alternate names.

The list gives an overview of Pennsylvania state parks and a brief history of their development since the first park opened in 1893. State parks range in size from 3 acres (1.2 ha) to 21,122 acres (8,548 ha) and comprise one percent of Pennsylvania's total land area. According to Dan Cupper (1993), "Pennsylvania is the thirty-third largest state, but only Alaska and California have more park land".

== Overview ==
There are state parks in 62 of Pennsylvania's 67 counties,^{[b]} which nearly reaches Pennsylvania's goal of having a state park within 25 miles (40 km) of every resident in the Commonwealth.^{[c]} Eleven parks do not have "State Park" in their name. Three are "Conservation Areas": Boyd Big Tree Preserve, Joseph E. Ibberson, and Varden; four are "Environmental Education Centers": Jacobsburg, Jennings, Kings Gap (also a "Training Center") and Nolde Forest; White Clay Creek is a "Preserve"; Norristown is a "Farm Park"; and Big Spring is a "State Forest Picnic Area".

Seven parks are undeveloped with no facilities: Allegheny Islands, Benjamin Rush, Bucktail, Erie Bluffs, Prompton, Swatara, and Varden; the last four of these are in the process of being developed. Five state parks are small picnic areas: Laurel Summit, Patterson, Prouty Place, Sand Bridge, and Upper Pine Bottom. Five state parks have major U.S. Army Corps of Engineers dams and/or lakes: Bald Eagle, Beltzville, Elk, Kettle Creek, and Sinnemahoning. Three former parks now belong, at least partly, to the U.S. Army Corps of Engineers. Seven parks preserve the industrial past: Canoe Creek is the site of a former lime kiln, and Caledonia, French Creek, Greenwood Furnace, Kings Gap, Mont Alto, and Pine Grove Furnace (plus one former park) are all former iron furnace sites. Eight current parks and one former park contain at least part of eight different National Natural Landmarks.^{[d]}

According to the DCNR, the state parks in Pennsylvania are on more than 300,000 acres (120,000 ha) with some 606 full-time and more than 1,600 part-time employees serving approximately 36 million visitors each year. Admission to all Pennsylvania state parks is free, although there are fees charged for use of cabins, marinas, etc. Pennsylvania's state parks offer "over 7,000 family campsites, 286 cabins, nearly 30,000 picnic tables, 56 major recreational lakes, 10 marinas, 61 beaches for swimming, 17 swimming pools" and over 1,000 miles (1,600 km) of trails.

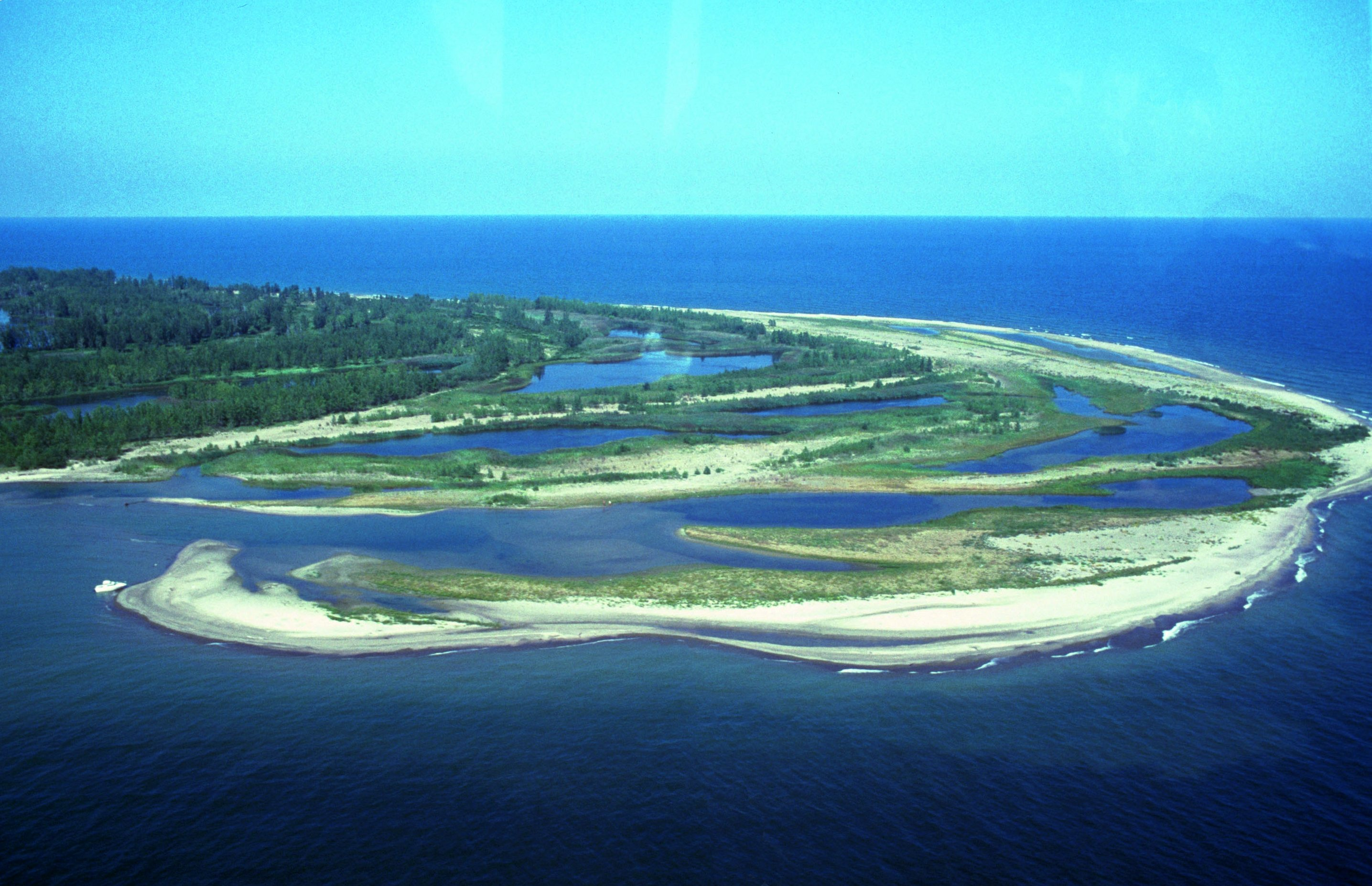
Presque Isle State Park,
on Lake Erie

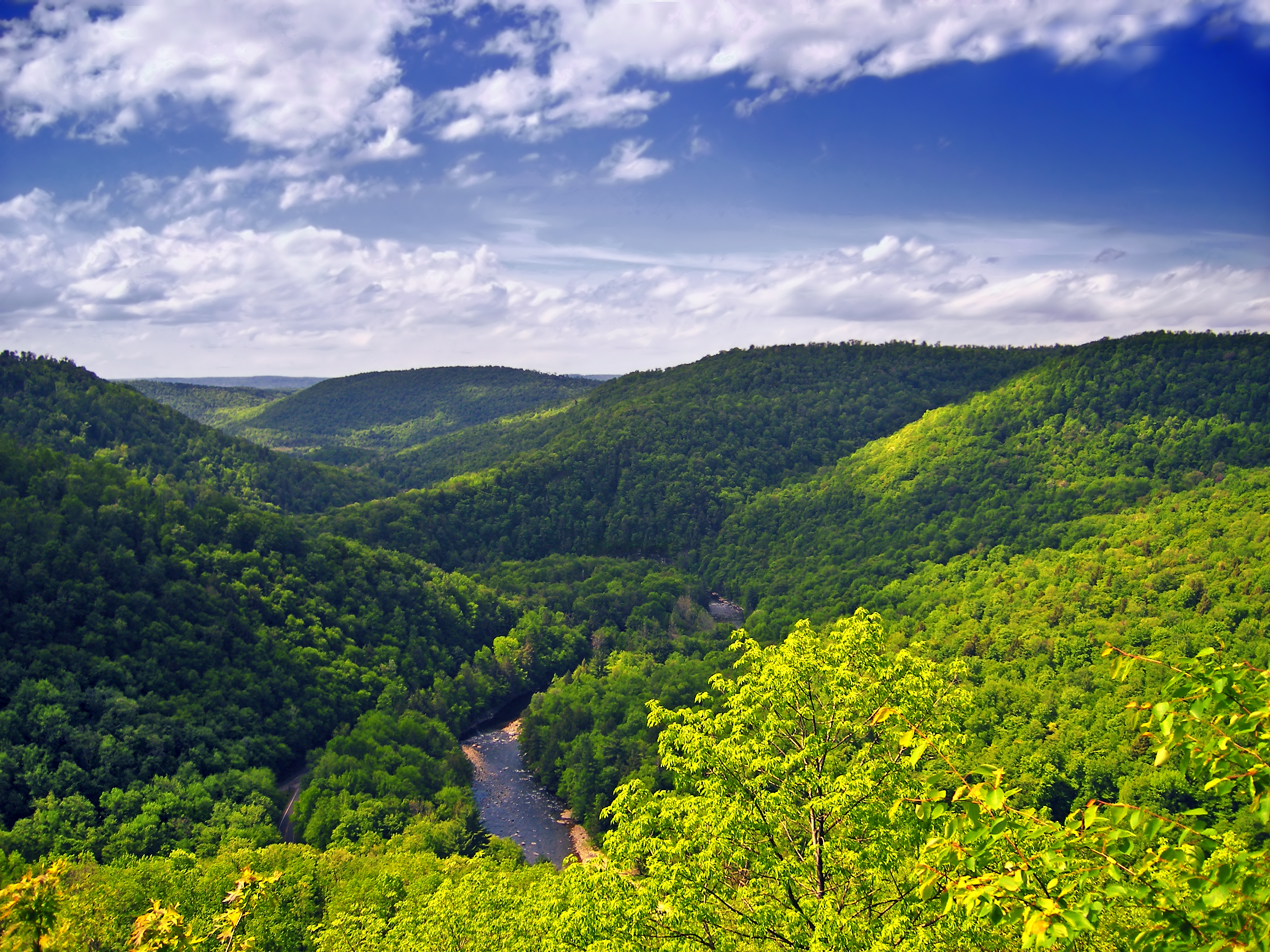
Worlds End State Park, Loyalsock Creek canyon

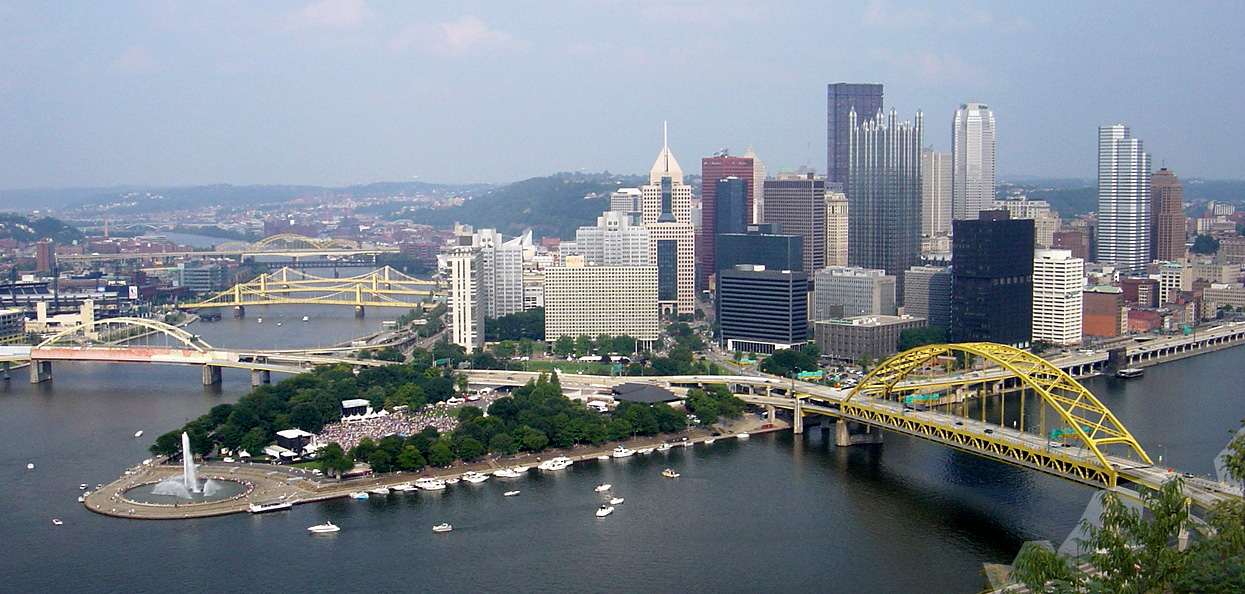
Point State Park,
in downtown Pittsburgh

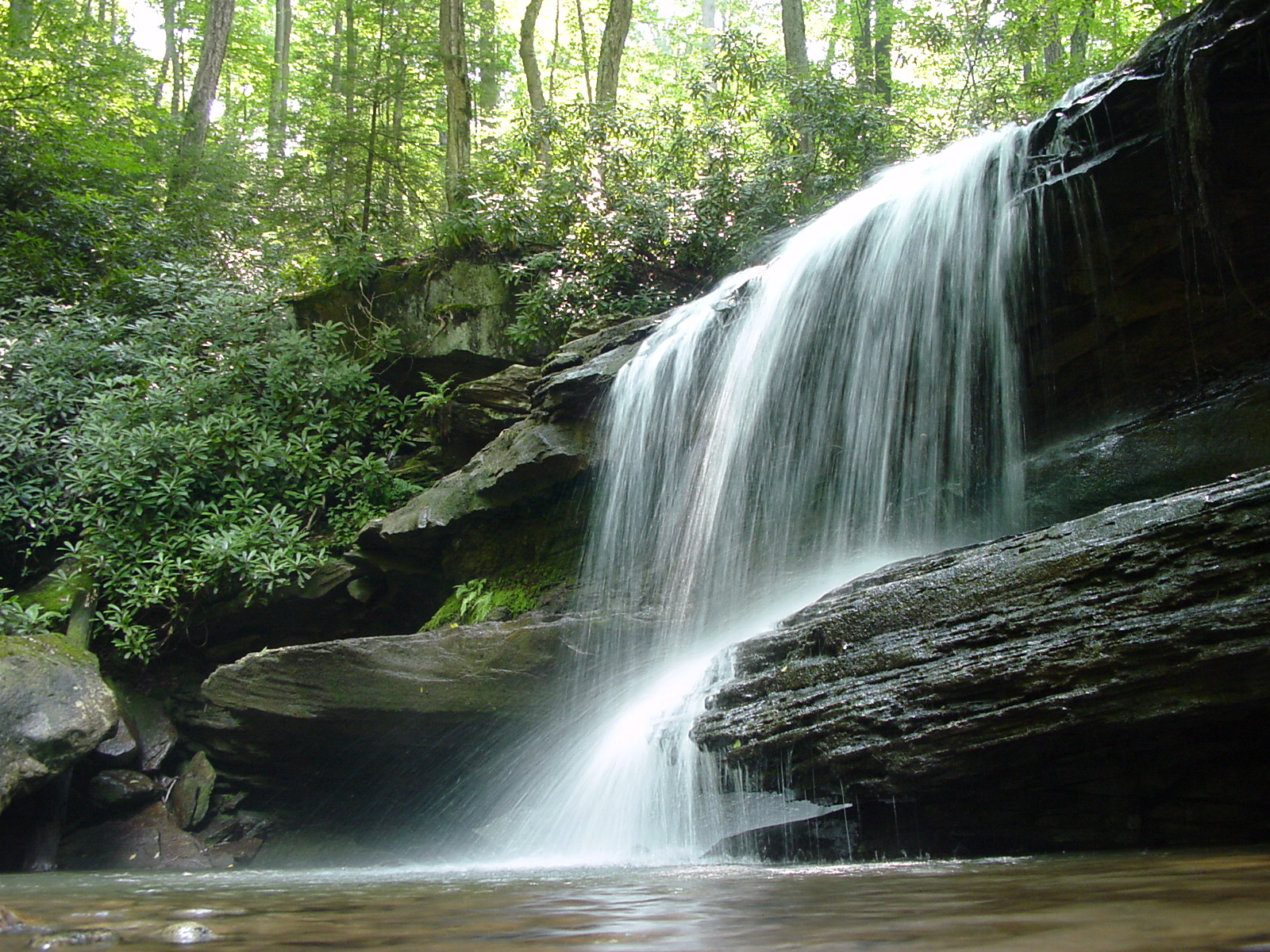
Ohiopyle State Park,
Jonathan Run Falls

== History ==
Pennsylvania's first state park was Valley Forge State Park, purchased by the Commonwealth on May 30, 1893, to preserve Valley Forge. It was transferred to the National Park Service (NPS) on the Bicentennial of the United States, July 4, 1976. Many state parks still preserve history: as of 2012, forty-two Pennsylvania state park sites are on the National Register of Historic Places, including two National Historic Landmarks (Delaware Canal and Point), twenty-eight Civilian Conservation Corps sites in nineteen parks, and twelve other parks' historic sites and districts. Eight of the former state parks were also chiefly historic.

In addition to preserving historic sites, Pennsylvania also sought to preserve natural beauty and offer opportunities for recreation in its state parks. In 1902, Mont Alto State Forest Park was the second park established, a year after the state "Bureau of Forestry" was set up to purchase, preserve, and restore Pennsylvania's forests, which had been ravaged by lumbering, charcoal production, and wild fires. Parks were added sporadically until the 1930s, some mere camping and picnic areas in state forests, while others preserved unique sites. The 1930s saw a great expansion of parks and their facilities under Governor Gifford Pinchot, who cooperated with President Franklin Roosevelt, despite their being of different political parties. The Civilian Conservation Corps (CCC) established 113 CCC camps in Pennsylvania (second only to California). Using CCC and Works Progress Administration (WPA) labor, the NPS built five Recreation Demonstration Areas, which became Pennsylvania state parks in 1945 and 1946: Blue Knob, French Creek, Hickory Run, Laurel Hill, and Raccoon Creek. The CCC also "fought forest fires, planted trees, built roads, buildings, picnic areas, swimming areas, campgrounds and created many state parks".^{[e]}

In 1956, there were forty-four state parks in Pennsylvania, mostly in rural areas. Forty-five parks had been added by 1979, mostly near urban areas, and the system had increased by 130,000 acres (53,000 ha). This was thanks largely to the efforts of Maurice K. Goddard, who served as director of the precursors to the DCNR for twenty-four years under six administrations. The number of visitors to parks more than tripled in this time and two voter approved bond issues (Projects 70 and 500) raised millions of dollars for park expansions and improvements. All this expansion was not without costs and by 1988 there was an estimated $90 million in deferred maintenance. In 1993, as the park system celebrated its one-hundredth anniversary, new tax and bond revenues were earmarked for the parks. Since 2000, parks are being improved through the state's Growing Greener and Growing Greener II and bond programs.

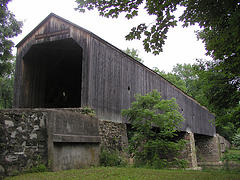
Tyler State Park,
Schofield Ford bridge

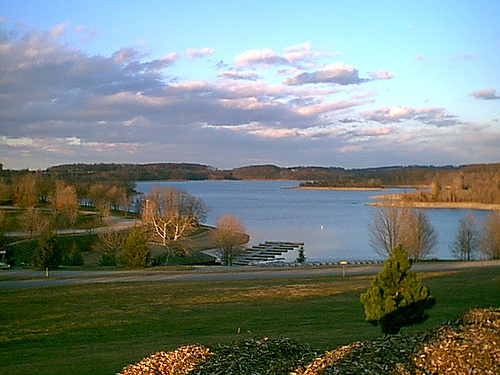
Codorus State Park,
man-made Lake Marburg

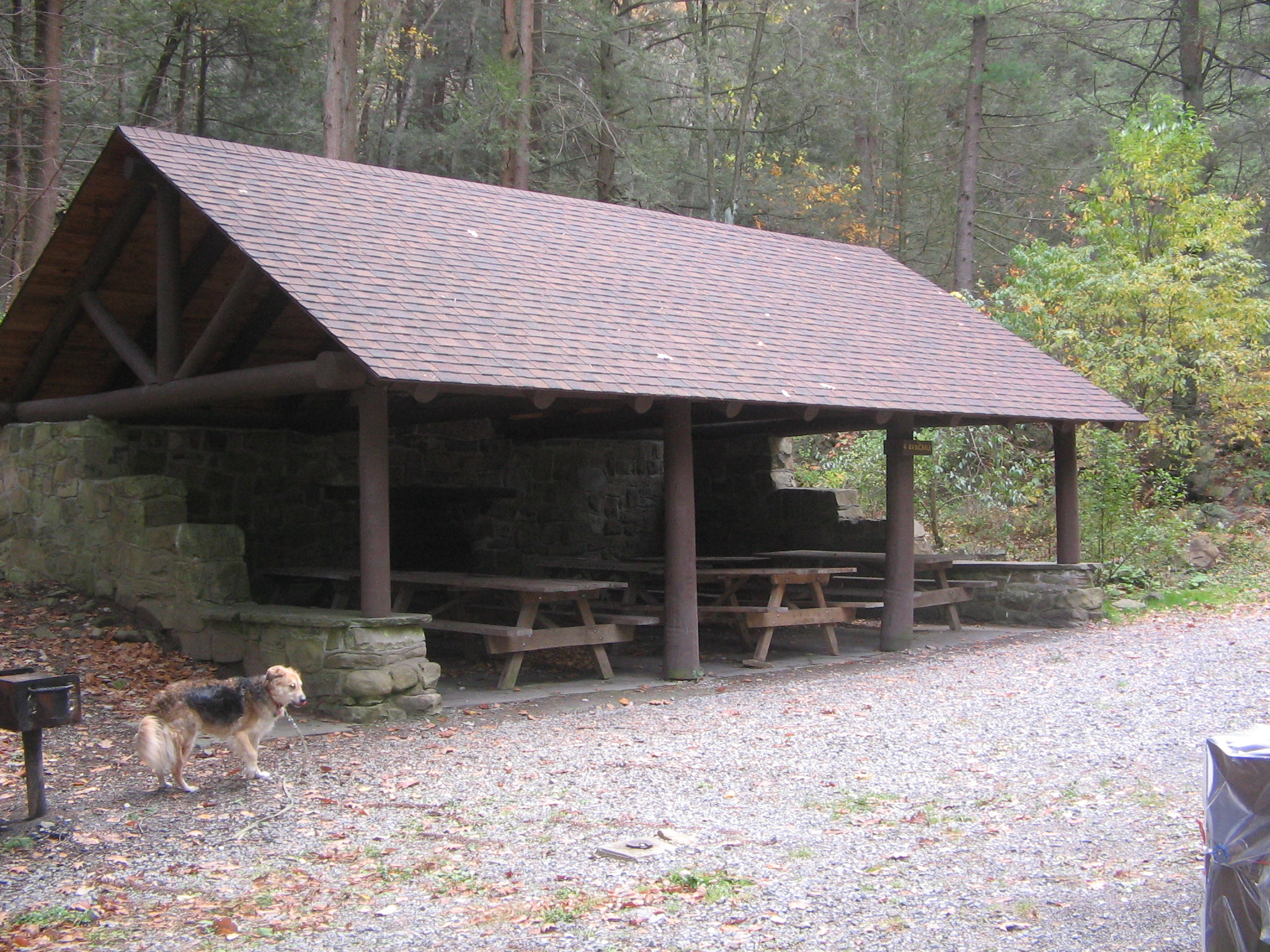
Ravensburg State Park, CCC picnic shelter

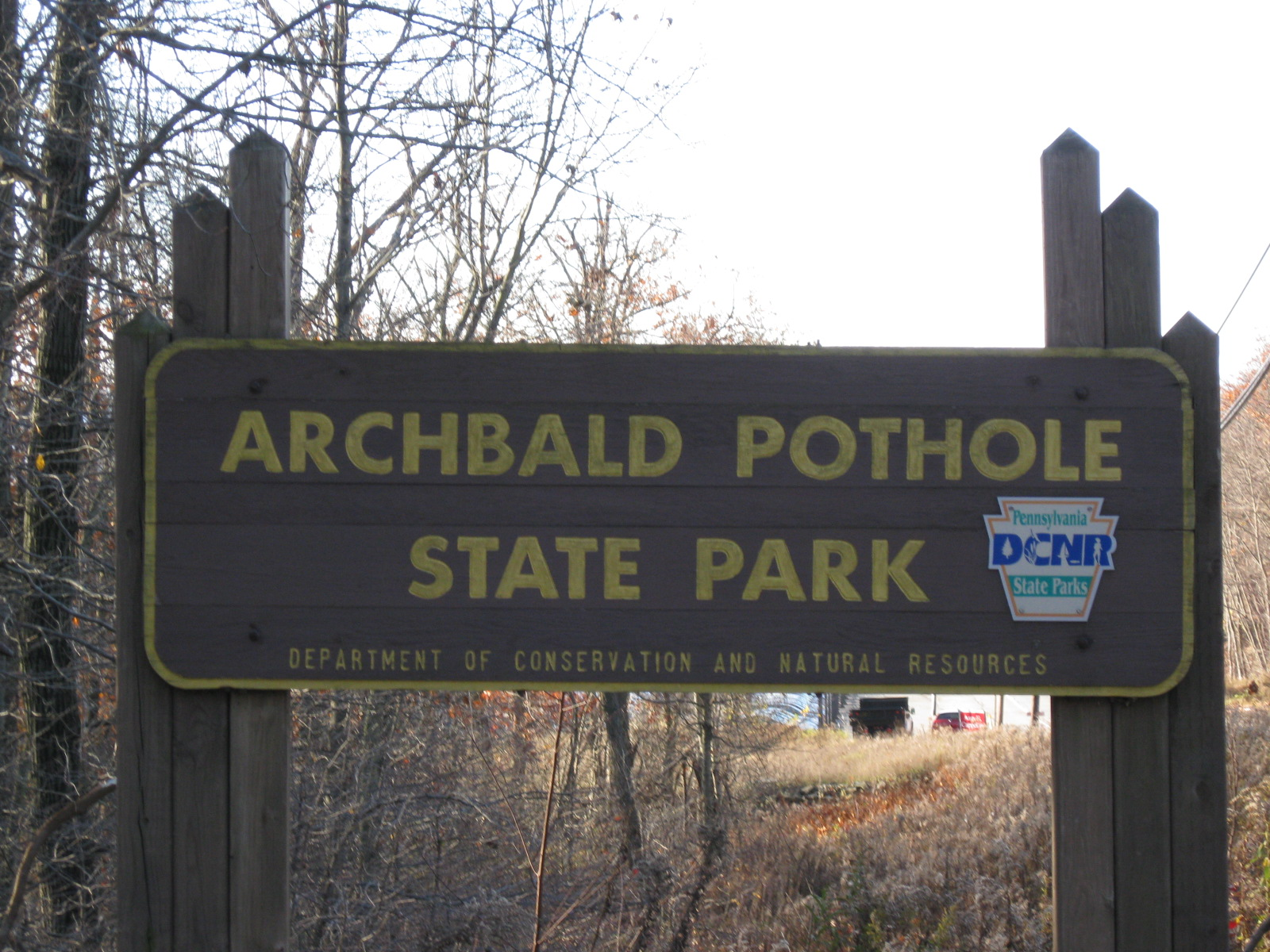
Archbald Pothole State Park, typical entrance sign

== Current parks ==
Current Pennsylvania state parks
| Park name | County or counties | Area in acres (ha) | Date founded | Stream(s) and / or lake(s) | Remarks | Image |
|---|---|---|---|---|---|---|
| Allegheny Islands State Park | Allegheny County | 43 acres (17 ha) | 1980 | Allegheny River | Three alluvial islands near Pittsburgh with no facilities, and accessible only by boat | Category:Allegheny Islands State Park on Wikimedia Commons |
| Archbald Pothole State Park | Lackawanna County | 150 acres (61 ha) | 1964 | None | One of world's largest potholes, 38 ft (12 m) deep, largest diameter 42 feet (13 m) by 24 feet (7 m) | Category:Archbald Pothole State Park on Wikimedia Commons |
| Bald Eagle State Park | Centre County | 5,900 acres (2,388 ha) | 1971 | Bald Eagle Creek, Foster Joseph Sayers Reservoir | 1,730 acre (700 ha) U.S. Army Corps of Engineers reservoir named for Medal of Honor recipient | Category:Bald Eagle State Park on Wikimedia Commons |
| Beltzville State Park | Carbon County | 2,973 acres (1,203 ha) | 1972 | Pohopoco Creek, Beltzville Lake | U.S. Army Corps of Engineers lake is 949 acres (384 ha) with 19.8 miles (31.9 km) of shoreline. | Category:Beltzville State Park on Wikimedia Commons |
| Bendigo State Park | Elk County | 100 acres (40 ha) | 1959 | East Branch Clarion River | Only 20 acres (8.1 ha) developed, name a corruption of Abednego | Category:Bendigo State Park on Wikimedia Commons |
| Benjamin Rush State Park | Philadelphia County | 275 acres (111 ha) | 1975 | None | Site of one of the world's largest community gardens, otherwise undeveloped | Category:Benjamin Rush State Park on Wikimedia Commons |
| Big Elk Creek State Park | Chester County | 1,712 acres (693 ha) | 2022 | Elk River (Maryland) | Big Elk Creek was an important transportation and natural resource corridor for indigenous people for thousands of years and an important area for freedom seekers on the Underground Railroad to the North. | |
| Big Pocono State Park | Monroe County | 1,306 acres (529 ha) | 1954 | None | On Camelback Mountain, site of Camelback Ski Area and Waterpark | Category:Big Pocono State Park on Wikimedia Commons |
| Big Spring State Forest Picnic Area | Perry County | 45 acres (18 ha) | 1936 | Big Spring Run (which forms Shermans Creek) | Park has trail to partially completed railroad tunnel in Conococheague Mountain. | Category:Big Spring State Park on Wikimedia Commons |
| Black Moshannon State Park | Centre County | 3,394 acres (1,374 ha) | 1937 | Black Moshannon Creek, Black Moshannon Lake | Park has bog with three carnivorous plant species and 17 orchid varieties.^{[f]}^{[g]} | Category:Black Moshannon State Park on Wikimedia Commons |
| Blue Knob State Park | Bedford County | 5,874 acres (2,377 ha) | 1945 | None | This former Recreation Demonstration Area on the state's second highest mountain has Blue Knob All Seasons Resort (skiing). | Category:Blue Knob State Park on Wikimedia Commons |
| Boyd Big Tree Preserve Conservation Area | Dauphin County | 914 acres (370 ha) | 1999 | Unnamed tributary of Fishing Creek | On Blue Mountain, one of three Conservation Areas, named for donor Alex Boyd | Category:Boyd Big Tree Preserve Conservation Area on Wikimedia Commons |
| Buchanan's Birthplace State Park | Franklin County | 18.5 acres (7 ha) | 1911 | Buck Run | Stone pyramid marks the birthplace of James Buchanan, 15th President of the United States. | Category:Buchanan's Birthplace State Park on Wikimedia Commons |
| Bucktail State Park Natural Area | Cameron and Clinton Counties | 21,039 acres (8,514 ha) | 1933 | Sinnemahoning Creek, West Branch Susquehanna River | Park, named for the Bucktail Regiment, is a 75-mile (121 km) undeveloped scenic drive on PA 120. | Category:Bucktail State Park on Wikimedia Commons |
| Caledonia State Park | Adams and Franklin Counties | 1,125 acres (455 ha) | 1903 | Rocky Mountain Creek, Carbaugh Run, East Branch Conococheague Creek | Park, named for Thaddeus Stevens' iron furnace, is home to summer stock Totem Pole Playhouse. | Category:Caledonia State Park on Wikimedia Commons |
| Canoe Creek State Park | Blair County | 658 acres (266 ha) | 1979 | Canoe Creek (tributary of Raystown Branch Juniata River), Canoe Creek Lake | Home of largest nursery colony of little brown bats in the state. | Category:Canoe Creek State Park on Wikimedia Commons |
| Chapman State Park | Warren County | 805 acres (326 ha) | 1951 | Farnsworth Run, West Branch Tionesta Creek, Chapman Lake | Trailhead for trail system in surrounding Allegheny National Forest | Category:Chapman State Park on Wikimedia Commons |
| Cherry Springs State Park | Potter County | 48 acres (19 ha) | 1922 | None | Park known for some of the clearest, darkest night skies in the state and eastern US.^{[f]}^{[g]} | Category:Cherry Springs State Park on Wikimedia Commons |
| Clear Creek State Park | Jefferson County | 1,676 acres (678 ha) | 1922 | Clear Creek, Clarion River | Start of popular canoe trip on 10 miles (6 km) of Clarion River to Cook Forest State Park^{[g]} | Category:Clear Creek State Park on Wikimedia Commons |
| Codorus State Park | York County | 3,329 acres (1,347 ha) | 1966 | Codorus Creek, Lake Marburg | Man-made lake is 1,275 acres (516 ha), named for former village of Marburg now flooded by it. | Category:Codorus State Park on Wikimedia Commons |
| Colonel Denning State Park | Cumberland County | 273 acres (110 ha) | 1936 | Doubling Gap Creek, Doubling Gap Lake | Park named for William Denning, an American Revolutionary War veteran who was never a colonel. | Category:Colonel Denning State Park on Wikimedia Commons |
| Colton Point State Park | Tioga County | 368 acres (149 ha) | 1936 | Pine Creek | On west rim of the Pennsylvania Grand Canyon, 800 feet (244 m) deep here^{[d]}^{[f]}^{[g]} | Category:Colton Point State Park on Wikimedia Commons |
| Cook Forest State Park | Clarion, Forest, and Jefferson Counties | 8,500 acres (3,440 ha) | 1927 | Toms Run, Clarion River | National Natural Landmark, one of America's top-50 state parks (National Geographic Traveler)^{[d]}^{[f]}^{[g]} | Category:Cook Forest State Park on Wikimedia Commons |
| Cowans Gap State Park | Franklin and Fulton Counties | 1,085 acres (439 ha) | 1937 | Little Aughwick Creek, Cowans Gap Lake | Site of French and Indian War road, pioneer homestead, lumbering, and CCC camp^{[g]} | Category:Cowans Gap State Park on Wikimedia Commons |
| Delaware Canal State Park | Bucks and Northampton Counties | 830 acres (336 ha) | 1931 | Delaware River | Park runs 60 miles (97 km) along Delaware Canal, the only 19th-century U.S. towpath canal left continuously intact.^{[f]}^{[g]} | Category:Delaware Canal State Park on Wikimedia Commons |
| Denton Hill State Park | Potter County | 700 acres (283 ha) | 1951 | None | Site of Ski Denton resort, also open for summer mountain biking | A snowy ski slope with several skiers on it and bare trees in the background |
| Elk State Park | Elk and McKean Counties | 3,192 acres (1,292 ha) | 1963 | East Branch Clarion River, East Branch Lake | U.S. Army Corps of Engineers lake is 1,160 acres (470 ha). | A large lake between two hilly shores, seen through trees in the foreground |
| Erie Bluffs State Park | Erie County | 540 acres (219 ha) | 2004 | Lake Erie | Park has 1.0 mile (0.6 km) of lake coastline and bluffs 90 feet (27 m) tall, and is being developed. | A stream spills over layered rock on a lake shore covered with small flat rocks |
| Evansburg State Park | Montgomery County | 3,349 acres (1,355 ha) | 1979 | Skippack Creek | Park has 18 hole Skippack Golf Course and many outdoor recreational opportunities.^{[g]} | A path through several green trees in dappled sunlight |
| Fort Washington State Park | Montgomery County | 493 acres (200 ha) | 1953 | Wissahickon Creek | George Washington camped here in the American Revolutionary War's Philadelphia campaign. | A stream curves between two banks lined with bare trees |
| Fowlers Hollow State Park | Perry County | 104 acres (42 ha) | 1936 | Fowlers Hollow Run | Trailhead for the trail system of the surrounding Tuscarora State Forest | A stream flows in front of a bank with many trees and a picnic table |
| Frances Slocum State Park | Luzerne County | 1,035 acres (419 ha) | 1968 | Abrahams Creek, Frances Slocum Lake | Park named for a girl kidnapped by the Lenape who lived the rest of her life with the Miami in Indiana. | A lake covered with green algae and bright brown bog plants, a forested shore is in the background |
| French Creek State Park | Berks and Chester Counties | 7,339 acres (2,970 ha) | 1946 | French Creek | Former Recreation Demonstration Area, adjacent to Hopewell Furnace National Historic Site^{[f]}^{[g]} | A flock of Canadian geese flying in front of a yellow sailboat with a yellow and white sail on a blue lake |
| Gifford Pinchot State Park | York County | 2,338 acres (946 ha) | 1961 | Beaver Creek (tributary of Conewago Creek), Pinchot Lake | Gifford Pinchot was a Pennsylvania governor, conservationist, and first US Forest Service Chief. | A gravel path runs across grass dotted with trees |
| Gouldsboro State Park | Monroe and Wayne Counties | 2,880 acres (1,165 ha) | 1958 | Gouldsboro Lake | Park named for village named for Jay Gould, next to Tobyhanna Army Depot. | A sunny lake with an island and shore covered in autumnal foliage under a blue sky with some clouds |
| Greenwood Furnace State Park | Huntingdon County | 423 acres (171 ha) | 1924 | Standing Stone Creek, Greenwood Lake | Includes ghost town of Greenwood, former ironworks and charcoal hearths^{[f]}^{[g]} | A large stone iron furnace with openings on each of the two sides visible |
| Hickory Run State Park | Carbon County | 15,550 acres (6,293 ha) | 1945 | Hickory Run, Lehigh River, Sand Spring Lake | Former Recreation Demonstration Area with a large boulder field that is a National Natural Landmark.^{[d]}^{[f]} | A large field of pink and grey boulders ringed by trees in the far distance. A few tiny human figures give a sense of the immense size of the boulder field. |
| Hillman State Park | Washington County | 3,600 acres (1,456 ha) | 1960s | Raccoon Creek | Managed for hunting by the Pennsylvania Game Commission and largely undeveloped | An overgrown field surrounded by bushes and trees under a blue sky |
| Hills Creek State Park | Tioga County | 407 acres (165 ha) | 1953 | Hills Creek, Hills Creek Lake | Land previously used as a pigment mine for the paint industry | Two trees in front of lake with some rushes and water plants in it. |
| Hyner Run State Park | Clinton County | 180 acres (73 ha) | 1958 | Hyner Run | On the site of Civilian Conservation Corps Camp S-75-PA | A sunlit dappled scene with many straight tree trunks, grass between, and a few picnic tables |
| Hyner View State Park | Clinton County | 6 acres (2 ha) | 1965 | None | Scenic view of the West Branch Susquehanna River and launching point for hang gliding^{[f]} | A person dangles below a red, yellow and white parasail, in the background is a lush forest with a large river and a tree-covered island. |
| Jacobsburg Environmental Education Center | Northampton County | 1,168 acres (473 ha) | 1959 | Bushkill Creek | Park surrounds Jacobsburg National Historic District, where rifles were manufactured during the American Revolution.^{[g]} | An unpainted wooden barn with a shingle roof in the sunlight |
| Jennings Environmental Education Center | Butler County | 300 acres (121 ha) | 1979 | Big Run | Park contains the only publicly protected relict prairie ecosystem in Pennsylvania, 20 acres (8.1 ha).^{[f]} | A field full of different wild plants, some flowering, with a line of trees in the background |
| Joseph E. Ibberson Conservation Area | Dauphin County | 350 acres (142 ha) | 2000 | None | On Peters Mountain, one of three Conservation Areas, named for donor Joseph E. Ibberson | A path leads through a green forest |
| Kettle Creek State Park | Clinton County | 1,793 acres (726 ha) | 1954 | Kettle Creek, Kettle Creek Reservoir | U.S. Army Corps of Engineers reservoir is 160 acres (65 ha), park has many recreational facilities built by CCC. | A view from atop a mountain of a blue lake between roling green hills and low mountains under a partly cloudy sky |
| Keystone State Park | Westmoreland County | 1,200 acres (486 ha) | 1945 | Keystone Run, Keystone Lake | Park is named for the Keystone Coal and Coke Company that once owned the land and created the lake. | About a dozen canoes and small boats on a grassy shore of a lake at left, with a large puddle and a bulletin board and trees at right |
| Kings Gap Environmental Education and Training Center | Cumberland County | 1,454 acres (588 ha) | 1973 | some vernal pools, Kings Gap Hollow Run, Irish Gap Run | Training center for park rangers of the Pennsylvania Department of Conservation and Natural Resources | A flagpole and pine tree in front of a large two story stone building with many windows |
| Kinzua Bridge State Park | McKean County | 329 acres (133 ha) | 1970 | Kinzua Creek | Had 1882 Historic Civil Engineering Landmark railway bridge, once the world's highest and longest, destroyed by a tornado in 2003.^{[f]}^{[g]} | A trestle bridge across an autumnal valley at left ends in a drop off at center, with collapsed remnants at right, all under a bright blue sky |
| Kooser State Park | Somerset County | 250 acres (101 ha) | 1922 | Kooser Run, Kooser Lake | Site of battles between Native American tribes, part of Whiskey Rebellion ^{[g]} | A cross-country skier in red beneath a pine tree covered in a heavy snow |
| Lackawanna State Park | Lackawanna County | 1,411 acres (571 ha) | 1972 | South Branch Tunkhannock Creek, Lake Lackawanna | On site of a Turn of the Century era community fair | A grey lake under grey skies with snow and ice blocks on its shore and snow covered low mountains in the background |
| Laurel Caverns State Park | Fayette County | 435 acres (176 ha) | 2026 | None | First Pennsylvania state park to be underground; 4+ miles of wide cave passages beneath a 435-acre geological preserve. | Two people waliking in Laurel Caverns |
| Laurel Hill State Park | Somerset County | 3,935 acres (1,592 ha) | 1945 | Laurel Hill Creek, Laurel Hill Lake | Former Recreation Demonstration Area with the largest CCC architecture collection of any Pennsylvania state park^{[g]} | Two children run across a grassy field to a wooden one-story cabin with a wall of trees behind |
| Laurel Mountain State Park | Somerset and Westmoreland Counties | 493 acres (200 ha) | 1964 | None | Opened in 1939 by Richard K. Mellon and Rolling Rock brewery as one of the state's first ski areas, donated to the state in 1964 | A road through a forest leads to a fieldstone building with a chmney and steep roof next to a stop sign |
| Laurel Ridge State Park | Cambria, Fayette, Somerset and Westmoreland Counties | 13,625 acres (5,514 ha) | 1967 | Conemaugh River, Youghiogheny River and tributaries | The park surrounds the 70 mile (113 km) long Laurel Highlands Hiking Trail. | A metal sink with running water supported by wooden beams in the foreground, a wooden open shelter with a stone chimney amidst the trees in the background |
| Laurel Summit State Park | Westmoreland County | 6 acres (2 ha) | 1964 | None | Day use picnic area and trailhead, 2,739 feet (835 m) above sea level | A path leads through flat stones and moss to a green forest with large trees, one of which has a blue trail blaze |
| Lehigh Gorge State Park | Carbon and Luzerne Counties | 4,548 acres (1,841 ha) | 1980 | Lehigh River | The Lehigh Gorge Trail follows the river through the park for 26 miles (42 km). | View from above of a curving river in a rocky gorge, several school buses and trucks towing trailers with boats and rafts are parked on a gravel area at left |
| Leonard Harrison State Park | Tioga County | 585 acres (237 ha) | 1922 | Pine Creek | On east rim of the Pennsylvania Grand Canyon, 800 feet (244 m) deep here^{[d]}^{[f]} | A creek in a long deep gorge between green wooded mountains under a partly cloudy sky |
| Linn Run State Park | Westmoreland County | 612 acres (248 ha) | 1924 | Grove, Rock and Linn Runs and Adams Falls | Once a barren wasteland, now a thriving second growth forest with an excellent trout stream^{[g]} | A small body of water surrounded by large rocks, evergreen trees and leaf covered ground |
| Little Buffalo State Park | Perry County | 923 acres (374 ha) | 1972 | Little Buffalo Creek, Holman Lake | Park named for the bison that are believed to have once roamed the ridge and valley region of Pennsylvania.^{[g]} | A red-orange sunset and the black silhouette of a line of trees are reflected in a smooth lake |
| Little Pine State Park | Lycoming County | 2,158 acres (873 ha) | 1937 | Little Pine Creek | Historians believe a Shawnee village and burial ground were just north of the park. | View from atop a grassy dam of a lake between and reflecting green mountains |
| Locust Lake State Park | Schuylkill County | 1,089 acres (441 ha) | 1966 | Locust Creek, Locust Lake | In a thriving second growth forest on the side of Locust Mountain | In the foreground a road with three wooden posts, a choppy blue lake behind with one small boat, ringed by green trees and low white clouds beneath a blue sky |
| Lyman Run State Park | Potter County | 595 acres (241 ha) | 1951 | Lyman Run, Lyman Run Lake | Site of a Prisoner of War Camp during World War II | A wooded mountain with bright fall leaves is reflected in a small lake with many plants sticking out of the surface |
| Marsh Creek State Park | Chester County | 1,705 acres (690 ha) | 1974 | Marsh Creek, Marsh Creek Lake | The village of Milford Mills was flooded by the creation of the lake, last Project 70 / 500 park.^{[g]} | A blue lake with small waves, the distant shore is wooded and there is a tree at right |
| Maurice K. Goddard State Park | Mercer County | 2,856 acres (1,156 ha) | 1972 | Sandy Creek, Lake Wilhelm | Park named for Maurice K. Goddard, who led the creation of 45 state parks in 24 years of service. | Trees with red, orange, and yellow leaves reflected in a lake |
| McCalls Dam State Park | Centre County | 8 acres (3 ha) | 1933 | White Deer Creek | In a remote location on a dirt road between R. B. Winter State Park and Eastville. | A small stream flows through dappled sunlight between grassy banks and trees |
| McConnells Mill State Park | Lawrence County | 2,546 acres (1,030 ha) | 1957 | Slippery Rock Creek | Features a deep scenic gorge with a restored watermill and a covered bridge^{[d]}^{[f]}^{[g]} | A wooden two-story building atop a stone foundation |
| Memorial Lake State Park | Lebanon County | 230 acres (93 ha) | 1945 | Indiantown Run, Memorial Lake | Surrounded by Fort Indiantown Gap, headquarters of the Pennsylvania National Guard | A bench and a picnic table on a grassy slope with a lake visible through trees in the distance |
| Milton State Park | Northumberland County | 82 acres (33 ha) | 1966 | West Branch Susquehanna River | On an island in the river, destroyed by Hurricane Agnes in 1972 and rebuilt | A green soccer field with trees and picnic tables along one edge and a highway bridge behind that |
| Mont Alto State Park | Franklin County | 24 acres (10 ha) | 1902 | West Branch Antietam Creek | Pennsylvania's current oldest state park and first State Forest Park, former iron works | A conical green metal roof supported by many black pillars, the whole structure is in the midst of woods |
| Moraine State Park | Butler County | 16,725 acres (6,768 ha) | 1970 | Muddy Creek, Lake Arthur | Park served as the location of the 1973 and 1977 National Scout Jamborees.^{[f]} | Three hot air balloons over a lake with a sailboat and forested shore |
| Mt. Pisgah State Park | Bradford County | 1,302 acres (527 ha) | 1979 | Pisgah Creek, Mill Creek, Stephen Foster Lake | Lake named for renowned American composer Stephen Foster. | A grassy lawn with picnic tables, trees and a boat with a curving lakeshore at right |
| Nescopeck State Park | Luzerne County | 3,550 acres (1,437 ha) | 2005 | Nescopeck Creek | One of the newest state parks in Pennsylvania | A fallow field in the foreground, with a line of trees and bushes and a forested ridge behind |
| Neshaminy State Park | Bucks County | 330 acres (134 ha) | 1956 | Delaware River | Park, on an estuary, donated by descendant of James Logan, colonial secretary to William Penn | View across a lake to a silhoutted skyline of a major city |
| Nockamixon State Park | Bucks County | 5,283 acres (2,138 ha) | 1973 | Tohickon Creek, Lake Nockamixon | Nockamixon means "place of soft soil" in the Lenape language. | A lake with a canoe and forested far shore, a flock of Canadian geese and picnic table are on the grassy near shore |
| Nolde Forest Environmental Education Center | Berks County | 665 acres (269 ha) | 1970 | Wyomissing Creek | Once a forest privately owned by Jacob Nolde | A wooden dock on the shore of a small lake in which autumnal trees are reflected |
| Norristown Farm Park | Montgomery County | 690 acres (279 ha) | 1995 | Stony Creek | Managed by the Montgomery County Department of Parks | Two wings of a white barn with two silos under a blue sky with cirrus clouds |
| Ohiopyle State Park | Fayette County | 19,052 acres (7,710 ha) | 1965 | Youghiogheny River and tributaries | One of the most popular white-water rafting destinations on the East Coast^{[d]}^{[f]} | Dozens of people wearing yellow life preservers and helmets in several blue inflatable rafts float down a river |
| Oil Creek State Park | Venango County | 6,250 acres (2,529 ha) | 1931 | Oil Creek | Edwin Drake drilled the first successful oil well in the world here in 1859.^{[f]} | A wooden derrick at left on grass, with trees and a mountain ridge in the background |
| Ole Bull State Park | Potter County | 132 acres (53 ha) | 1925 | Ole Bull Run, Kettle Creek | Location of a Norwegian colony established by renowned violinist Ole Bull | A stream flows between several trees with a pyramidal-shaped mountain in the background |
| Parker Dam State Park | Clearfield County | 968 acres (392 ha) | 1936 | Laurel Run, Parker Lake | A herd of elk lives in and near the park.^{[g]} | A line of trees reflected in a still lake under a cloudy sky |
| Patterson State Park | Potter County | 10 acres (4 ha) | 1925 | None | Day use picnic area on PA 44, surrounded by Susquehannock State Forest | A green pyramidal roof supported by log pillars over three picnic tables, leafless trees are around it and a road runs behind |
| Penn-Roosevelt State Park | Centre County | 41 acres (17 ha) | 1983 | Sassafras Run, Standing Stone Creek | Once a segregated black Civilian Conservation Corps camp during the Great Depression | Water pours over a narrow spillway with a sunlit stone dam structure on either side |
| Pine Grove Furnace State Park | Cumberland County | 696 acres (282 ha) | 1913 | Mountain Creek, Fuller Lake, Laurel Lake | The furnaces at Pine Grove could consume an acre of trees a day.^{[f]}^{[g]} | Category:Pine Grove Furnace State Park on Wikimedia Commons |
| Poe Paddy State Park | Centre County | 23 acres (9 ha) | 1938 | Big Poe Creek, Penns Creek | Noted by anglers for the shadfly hatch that occurs in late spring | A forest with a bench along a stream in the background |
| Poe Valley State Park | Centre County | 620 acres (251 ha) | 1938 | Big Poe Creek, Poe Lake | Built during the Great Depression by the CCC | Several trees with autumnal foliage on the shore of a lake reflecting a forested mountain |
| Point State Park | Allegheny County | 36 acres (15 ha) | 1974 | Allegheny, Monongahela, Ohio rivers | In downtown Pittsburgh at meeting of three rivers, site of Fort Pitt^{[g]} | Red, orange, and yellow leaves on trees in an urban park on the shore of a river, a yellow bridge rises in the background |
| Presque Isle State Park | Erie County | 3,200 acres (1,295 ha) | 1921 | Lake Erie | The most visited state park in Pennsylvania, on a peninsula in lake with many beaches^{[d]}^{[f]}^{[g]} | A small pale yellow metal lighthouse with a red roof on the shore of a lake with a massive white cloud behind |
| Prince Gallitzin State Park | Cambria County | 6,249 acres (2,529 ha) | 1965 | Beaverdam Run, Glendale Lake | Park named for Demetrius Gallitzin, Russian nobleman turned Roman Catholic priest. | A pontoon boat on a lake with a forested shore |
| Promised Land State Park | Pike County | 3,000 acres (1,214 ha) | 1905 | Wallenpaupack Creek, Promised Land Lake, Lower Lake | Name is an ironic commentary created by immigrant residents, once owned by the Shakers.^{[f]}^{[g]} | A field of ferns with a green forest behind |
| Prompton State Park | Wayne County | 2,000 acres (809 ha) | 1962 | Lackawaxen River, Prompton Lake | Being developed with the help of Friends of Prompton | A lake with a gravel shore in the foreground and a forested distant shore |
| Prouty Place State Park | Potter County | 5 acres (2 ha) | 1925 | Prouty Run | Day use picnic area on Long Toe Road | A rock-filled narrow stream flows through a forest |
| Pymatuning State Park | Crawford County | 21,122 acres (8,548 ha) | 1934 | Shenango River, Pymatuning Lake | This is the largest state park in Pennsylvania, with one of the largest lakes.^{[f]} | A marina with several sailboats |
| R. B. Winter State Park | Union County | 695 acres (281 ha) | 1933 | Halfway Creek, Halfway Lake | Park has first cement and stone dam ever built by the Civilian Conservation Corps.^{[g]} | Sunlit water spills over a stone dam in a bright green grassy landscape |
| Raccoon Creek State Park | Beaver County | 7,572 acres (3,064 ha) | 1945 | Little Traverse Creek, Raccoon Lake | Park was built by the CCC and WPA as one of five National Park Service Recreation Demonstration Areas in state.^{[f]}^{[g]} | A waterfall pours through a semicircular hole in a rock ledge |
| Ralph Stover State Park | Bucks County | 45 acres (18 ha) | 1931 | Tohickon Creek | High Rocks portion of the park was donated to Pennsylvania by James Michener in 1956. | View from a high rock of water in trees, some bare and some with autumn leaves |
| Ravensburg State Park | Clinton County | 78 acres (32 ha) | 1933 | Rauchtown Run | Park named for the ravens that flock near the gorge.^{[g]} | White water spills over a stone dam in a grassy setting with a highway guardrail in the background |
| Reeds Gap State Park | Mifflin County | 220 acres (89 ha) | 1938 | Honey Creek | Once a gathering place for the locals to hold picnics and listen to travelling evangelists | Two picnic tables, a bench and wooden footbridge in a forest |
| Ricketts Glen State Park | Columbia, Luzerne, and Sullivan Counties | 13,050 acres (5,281 ha) | 1942 | Kitchen Creek | Known for its many waterfalls, it was slated to become a National Park, but did not due to redirection of funds during World War II.^{[d]}^{[f]} | A very tall waterfall in the midst of snow-covered rocks and trees |
| Ridley Creek State Park | Delaware County | 2,606 acres (1,055 ha) | 1972 | Ridley Creek | Adjacent to the John J. Tyler Arboretum^{[g]} | Several streams of water fall over a dam made of large rocks under autumn leaves |
| Ryerson Station State Park | Greene County | 1,164 acres (471 ha) | 1967 | North Fork of the Dunkard Fork of Wheeling Creek, Ronald J. Duke Lake | 52 acre (21 ha) man-made lake, 38 miles (61 km) from next nearest Pennsylvania state park (Hillman) | A small stream in the foreground lined with tangled small trees, in the background is a level are with standing water and fields edged by forest |
| S. B. Elliott State Park | Clearfield County | 318 acres (129 ha) | 1933 | Stony Run | Park named for Simon B. Elliott, a noted Pennsylvania conservationist and legislator.^{[g]} | Rustic picnic shelters, one stone and one timber, with red, orange and yellow leaves on surrounding trees |
| Salt Springs State Park | Susquehanna County | 405 acres (164 ha) | 1973 | Fall Brook | Park has three waterfalls and its hemlocks are over 500 years old and some of the largest trees in the state. | A curving boardwalk through a forest of massive hemlock trees |
| Samuel S. Lewis State Park | York County | 85 acres (34 ha) | 1954 | None | Park named for its donor, a Secretary of the Department of Forests and Waters; now popular for star gazing. | A red bench on a large expanse of brown cut grass, overlooking rolling forested hills and a lake |
| Sand Bridge State Park | Union County | 3 acres (1 ha) | 1978 | Rapid Run | This is the smallest state park in Pennsylvania, a day use picnic area on PA 192. | A brown wooden sign with yellow letters reading "Sand Bridge State Park Picnic Area Pennsylvania Department of Conservation and Natural Resources" in front of a highway and pale green two story frame house |
| Shawnee State Park | Bedford County | 3,983 acres (1,612 ha) | 1951 | Lake Shawnee | Rental lodge on an island in the lake | A canoe on a lake surrounded by forest |
| Shikellamy State Park | Northumberland and Union Counties | 132 acres (53 ha) | 1960 | West Branch and North Branch Susquehanna River | Park overlook is at confluence of West Branch and North Branch Susquehanna River, marina added in 1972. | A concrete highway bridge crosses a large river in front of a tall wooded bluff |
| Sinnemahoning State Park | Cameron and Potter Counties | 1,910 acres (773 ha) | 1962 | Sinnemahoning Creek, George B. Stevenson Reservoir | U.S. Army Corps of Engineers reservoir is 142 acres (57 ha), park home to rare elk and bald eagle. | View from a lookout of green tree-covered mountains under a blue sky with white clouds |
| Sizerville State Park | Cameron and Potter Counties | 386 acres (156 ha) | 1924 | Cowley Run | Park named for the nearby ghost town of Sizerville. | A rockky stream between two grassy banks with picnic tables, forest in the background |
| Susquehanna Riverlands State Park | York County | 1,100 acres (445 ha) | 2022 | Susquehanna River | The largely wooded tract, located where Codorus Creek flows into the Susquehanna River, protects critical water and forest resources. | |
| Susquehanna State Park | Lycoming County | 20 acres (8 ha) | 1961 | West Branch Susquehanna River | Park operated by the Williamsport/Lycoming Chamber of Commerce, home to paddlewheeler Hiawatha. | A red, white and blue paddlewheel boat with a sign "Hiawatha" on a river with a forested mountain behind |
| Susquehannock State Park | Lancaster County | 224 acres (91 ha) | 1965 | Susquehanna River | Park named for the Susquehannock, whose chief village was nearby. | View of a very wide river lined with bare trees in reddish light under a blue sky streaked with clouds |
| Swatara State Park | Lebanon and Schuylkill Counties | 3,515 acres (1,422 ha) | 1987 | Swatara Creek | Rail trail is on the former Lebanon & Tremont Branch of Philadelphia & Reading Railroad, park being developed.^{[g]} | A metal-frame bridge over a broad stream in a forest |
| Tobyhanna State Park | Monroe and Wayne Counties | 5,440 acres (2,201 ha) | 1949 | Tobyhanna Creek, Tobyhanna Lake | Once part of an artillery range for Tobyhanna Army Depot | Red and yellow foliage in the right foreground, with a smooth lake reflecting the distant forest and partly cloudy sky |
| Trough Creek State Park | Huntingdon County | 554 acres (224 ha) | 1936 | Great Trough Creek, Raystown Lake | Bald eagles have migrated here naturally since the early 1990s.^{[f]}^{[g]} | View from a flat rock across a forest to several wooded mountain peaks |
| Tuscarora State Park | Schuylkill County | 1,618 acres (655 ha) | 1971 | Locust Creek, Tuscarora Lake | The Tuscarora moved to the area after the Tuscarora War in North Carolina, were later forced out by colonial settlement. | Several rowboats and canoes on the shore of lake with lily pads |
| Tyler State Park | Bucks County | 1,711 acres (692 ha) | 1974 | Neshaminy Creek | Old original stone dwellings in park are fine examples of early farm dwellings of rural Pennsylvania. | View across a field to a large white building and woods |
| Upper Pine Bottom State Park | Lycoming County | 5 acres (2 ha) | 1924 | Upper Pine Bottom Run | A roadside park and picnic area for day use only, on PA 44 | A low fieldstone wall next to a tree trunk in a wooded area |
| Varden Conservation Area | Wayne County | 343 acres (139 ha) | 2001 | Middle Creek | One of three Conservation Areas, donated by Dr. Mead Shaffer, being developed | A mowed field in the center, an unmowed field at right, woods at left and in the background |
| Vosburg Neck State Park | Wyoming County | 669 acres (271 ha) | 2022 | Susquehanna River#North Branch Susquehanna | Public access for water-based recreation to the North Branch of the Susquehanna River. | |
| Warriors Path State Park | Bedford County | 349 acres (141 ha) | 1965 | Raystown Branch Juniata River | Park named for the Great Indian Warpath used by the Iroquois in war raids on the Cherokee and other tribes. | A path through a green forest with many shrubs |
| Washington Crossing Historic Park | Bucks County | 500 acres (202 ha) | 2016 | Delaware River | Site of George Washington's crossing of the Delaware River. Transferred from the Historical and Museum Commission in 2016. | McConkey's Ferry Inn |
| Whipple Dam State Park | Huntingdon County | 256 acres (104 ha) | 1928 | Whipple Lake | There was a camp for Boy Scouts, Girl Scouts, and Campfire Girls on the north side of lake from 1928 to 1941.^{[g]} | A metal rowboat chained to a metal pole with a lake behind |
| White Clay Creek Preserve | Chester County | 1,255 acres (508 ha) | 1984 | White Clay Creek | Park was donated by DuPont to preserve "diverse and unique plant and animal species, and the rich cultural heritage of the area". | Two streams with rock strewn banks meet in a wooded area |
| Worlds End State Park | Sullivan County | 780 acres (316 ha) | 1932 | Loyalsock Creek | A "Must See Park" known for trout fishing, white-water kayaking, camping, and hiking on the Loyalsock Trail.^{[f]}^{[g]} | A man in an orange shirt and tan vest fishes in a stream with rapids and large boulders |
| Yellow Creek State Park | Indiana County | 3,140 acres (1,271 ha) | 1963 | Yellow Creek, Yellow Creek Lake | Crossed by the Kittanning Path, a major east–west Native American trail during the 18th century | A tree-lined lake with lily pads and four pontoon boats at a dock in the distance |

== Other names of current parks ==
The following are significantly different former or alternate names for nine current Pennsylvania state parks. Note that many parks were originally "State Forest Parks" or were state public camping or picnic areas in Pennsylvania state forests. In modern times, some "State Parks" have become "Environmental Education Centers", while other parks have dropped one word from their name ("Cherry Springs Drive" is now Cherry Springs, "Codorus Creek" is now Codorus, "Kooser Lake" is now Kooser, "Laurel Hill Summit" is now Laurel Summit, and "Promised Land Lake" is now Promised Land). Such minor name changes are not included in this table.

Former or alternate names of current Pennsylvania state parks
| Former or alternate Name | County or counties | Date name changed | Current park name | Remarks |
|---|---|---|---|---|
| Adams Falls Class A Campground | Westmoreland County | unknown | Linn Run State Park | Adams Falls is a waterfall on Linn Run within Linn Run State Park (which has both an "Adams Falls Picnic Area" and "Adams Falls Trail"). |
| Halfway State Park | Union County | 1955 | R. B. Winter State Park | Park was renamed for Raymond B. Winter, a Forest Ranger who established it and worked there 45 years; also known as "Halfway Dam State Park". |
| High Rocks State Park | Bucks County | unknown | Ralph Stover State Park | "High Rocks" refers to part of park added in 1956; this name is listed in the USGS GNIS, but was never an official DCNR name or separate park. |
| Pennsylvania State Park at Erie | Erie County | unknown | Presque Isle State Park | This was only the second "State Park" by name in the state when established in 1921; also known unofficially as "Peninsula State Park". |
| Sandy Creek State Park | Mercer County | 1969 | Maurice K. Goddard State Park | Proposed as "Sandy Creek" (on Sandy Creek), but the name was changed (despite the objections of Dr. Goddard) before park officially opened in 1972. |
| Theodore Roosevelt State Park | Bucks and Northampton Counties | 1989 | Delaware Canal State Park | Park was originally named for Theodore Roosevelt, who had no connection to it; renamed for its focus, the Delaware Canal. |
| Tohickon State Park | Bucks County | 1965 | Nockamixon State Park | Park was proposed in 1958 as "Tohickon" (on Tohickon Creek), but the name was changed before the park officially opened in 1973. |
| Whirl's End State Park | Sullivan County | 1936 and 1943 | Worlds End State Park | "Whirl's End" 1936–1943 (for whirlpool in Loyalsock Creek); "Worlds End" 1932–1936 and 1943 to present (for remote location); also known as "Whirl's Glen" |
| Valhalla State Forest Park | Potter County | 1920s | Ole Bull State Park | "Valhalla" was a settlement in Ole Bull's failed Norwegian colony, now within the boundaries of Ole Bull State Park. |

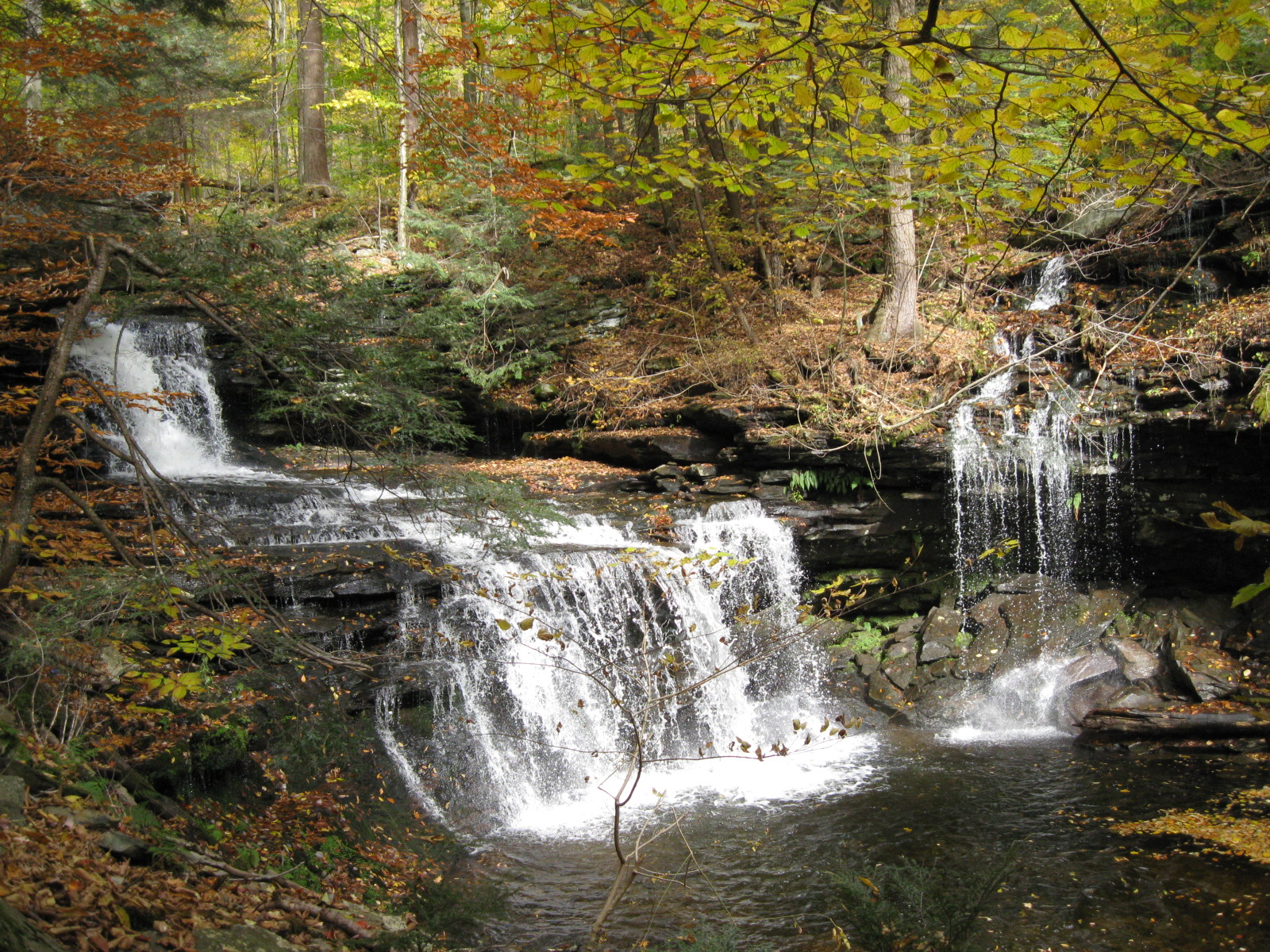
Ricketts Glen State Park, 24 named waterfalls

Black Moshannon State Park, bog and lake

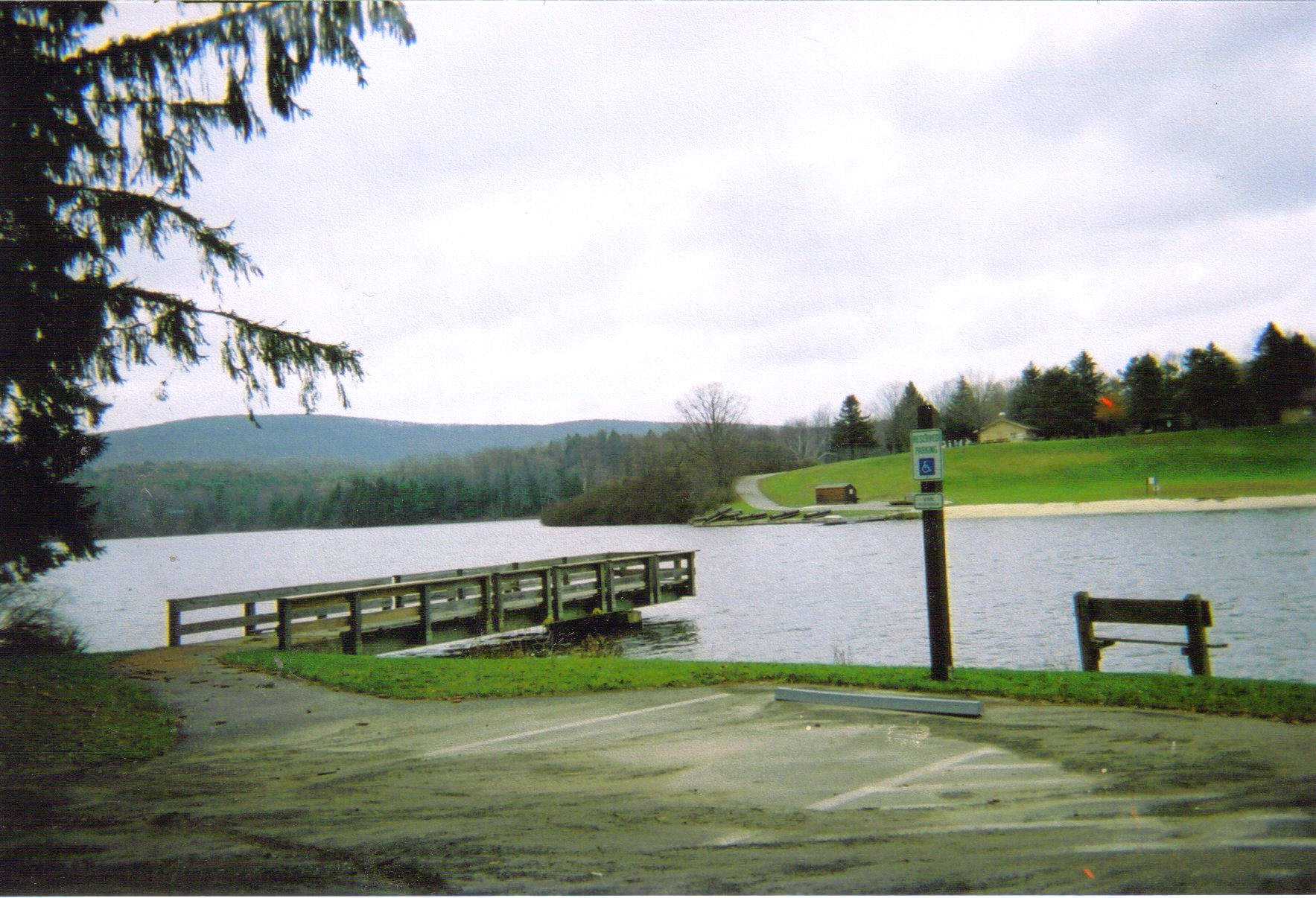
Hills Creek State Park,
boat dock on lake

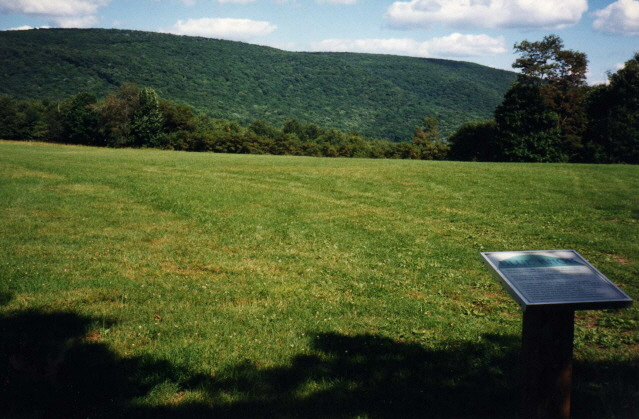
Blue Knob State Park,
Blue Knob

== Former parks ==
The following eighteen were once Pennsylvania state parks, but have been transferred to federal (National Park Service, U.S. Army Corps of Engineers) or state (Pennsylvania Historical and Museum Commission, Pennsylvania Game Commission, Pennsylvania Bureau of Forestry) agencies, or ceased to exist.^{[h]}

Former Pennsylvania state parks
| Former state park | County or counties | Date jurisdiction changed | Current name | Remarks |
|---|---|---|---|---|
| Allegheny River State Park | Venango County | 1980 | Kennerdell (or Allegheny River) tract | Now part of Clear Creek State Forest (Pennsylvania Bureau of Forestry) |
| Blue Marsh State Park | Berks County | 1978 | Blue Marsh Lake and Pennsylvania State Game Lands Number 280 | Park was completed, but without funds to operate it, so was given to the Pennsylvania Game Commission, now also partly a U.S. Army Corps of Engineers site. |
| Brandywine Battlefield State Park | Delaware County | unknown | Brandywine Battlefield | Now a Pennsylvania Historical and Museum Commission site |
| Bushy Run Battlefield State Park | Westmoreland County | unknown | Bushy Run Battlefield | Now a Pennsylvania Historical and Museum Commission site |
| Colerain State Park | Huntingdon County | unknown | Colerain Picnic Area | Now part of Rothrock State Forest (Pennsylvania Bureau of Forestry) although as of 2012 it is not shown on the official state forest web site or map; also known historically as "Colerain Forge". |
| Conrad Weiser Memorial Park | Berks County | 1953 | Conrad Weiser Homestead | Now a Pennsylvania Historical and Museum Commission site |
| Crooked Creek State Park | Armstrong County | unknown | Crooked Creek Lake Recreation Area | Now a U.S. Army Corps of Engineers site |
| Curwensville State Park | Clearfield County | unknown | Curwensville Lake on the West Branch Susquehanna River | Now a U.S. Army Corps of Engineers site, recreation area operated by Clearfield County |
| Drake Well State Park | Venango County | 1943 | Drake Well Museum | Now a Pennsylvania Historical and Museum Commission site |
| Fort Necessity State Park | Fayette County | 1961 | Fort Necessity National Battlefield | Now part of a National Park Service site |
| George W. Childs State Park | Pike County | 1983 | George W. Childs Recreation Site | Now part of Delaware Water Gap National Recreation Area, a National Park Service site; it was donated to the state for a park in 1912 by the widow of Dr. Childs. |
| Hemlock State Forest Park | Perry County | unknown | Hemlocks Natural Area | Now part of Tuscarora State Forest (Pennsylvania Bureau of Forestry) |
| Independence Mall State Park | Philadelphia County | 1975 | Independence National Historical Park | Now a National Park Service site |
| Moosic Lake State Park | Lackawanna County | 1930s | No longer in existence | The Pennsylvania state legislature created park in early 1930s, but did not fund it, so it never came into existence. |
| Snyder-Middleswarth State Park^{[d]} | Snyder County | 1980s | Snyder Middleswarth Natural Area and Picnic Area | Now part of Bald Eagle State Forest (Pennsylvania Bureau of Forestry), established 1921 |
| Valley Forge State Park | Montgomery County | 1976 | Valley Forge National Historical Park | Now a National Park Service site, it was established in 1893 as the first state park in Pennsylvania. |
| Voneida State Forest Park | Centre County | unknown | Hairy Johns State Forest Picnic Area | Now part of Bald Eagle State Forest (Pennsylvania Bureau of Forestry), it was established 1922 and named for "Hairy John" Voneida |

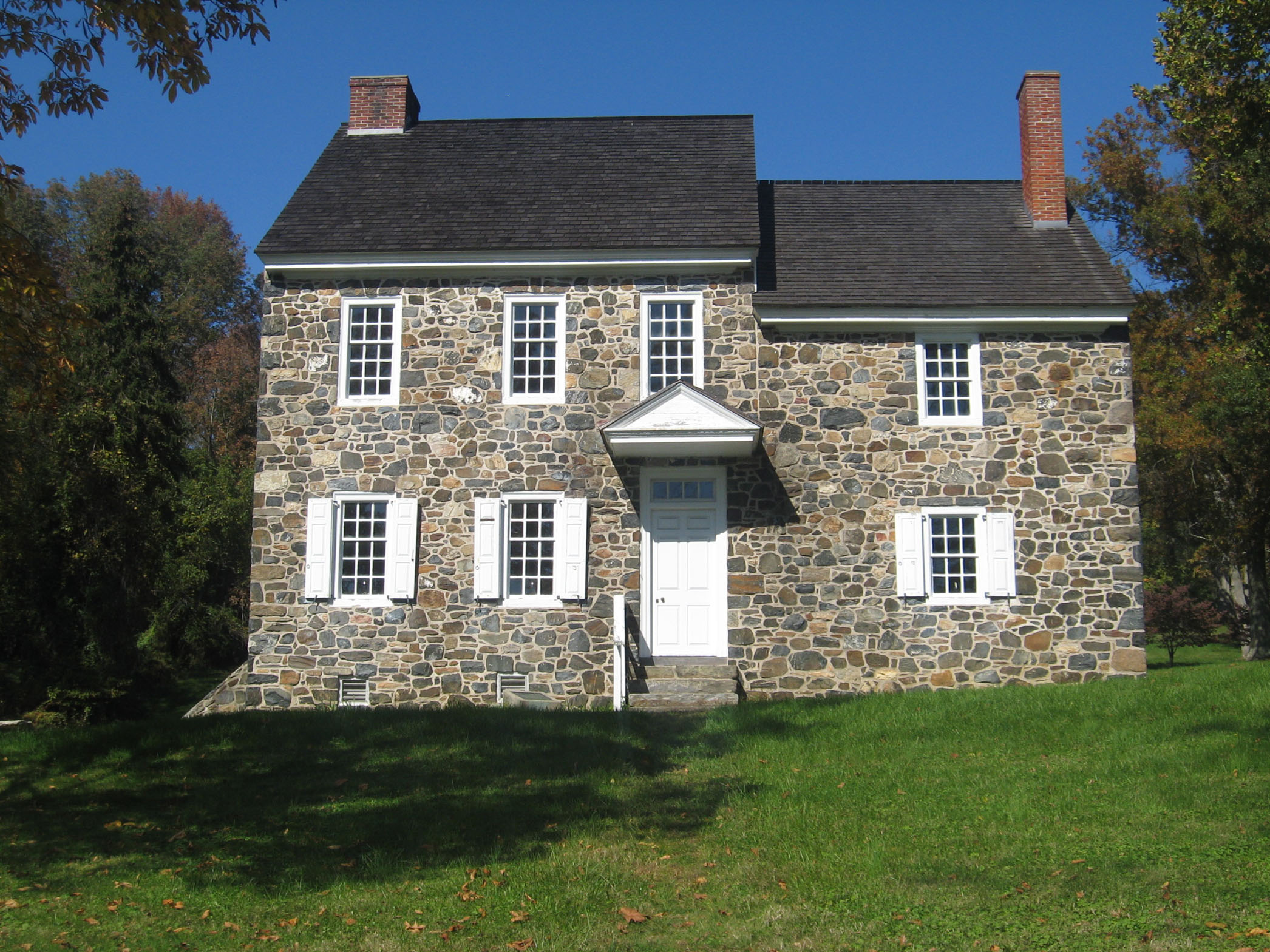
Brandywine Battlefield, Washington's HQ

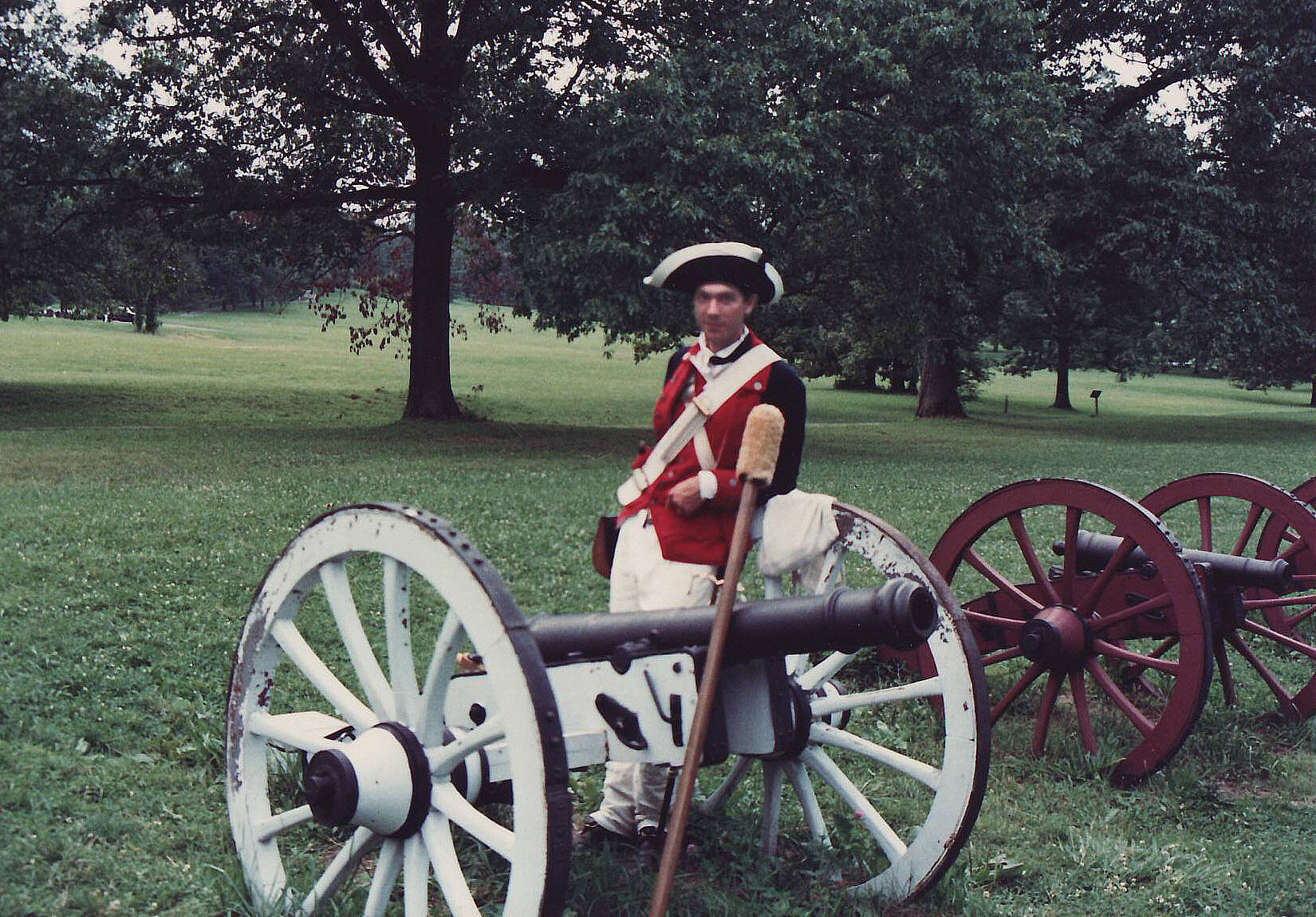
Valley Forge, Ranger in Continental Army uniform

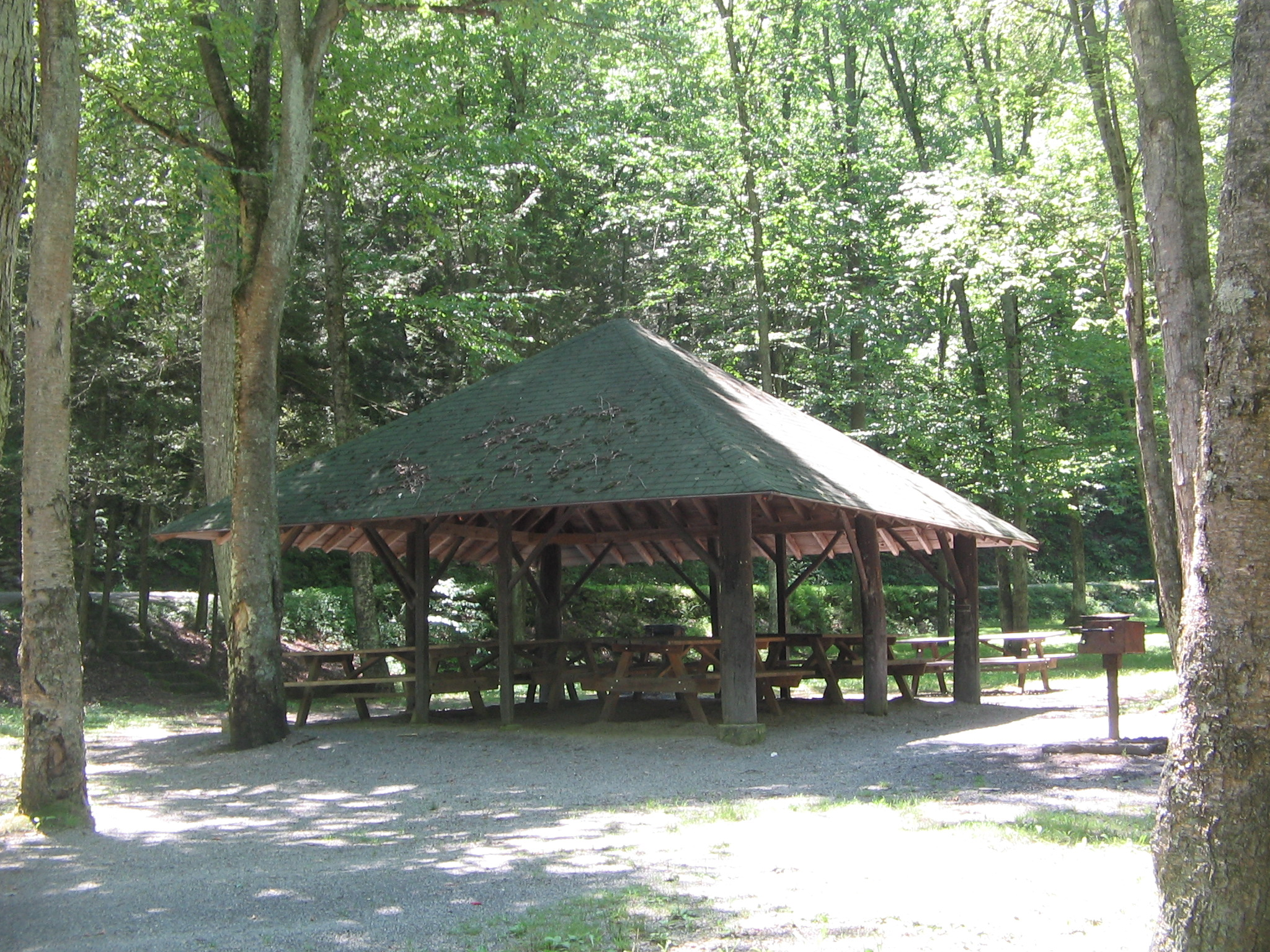
Snyder Middleswarth Natural Area, picnic area

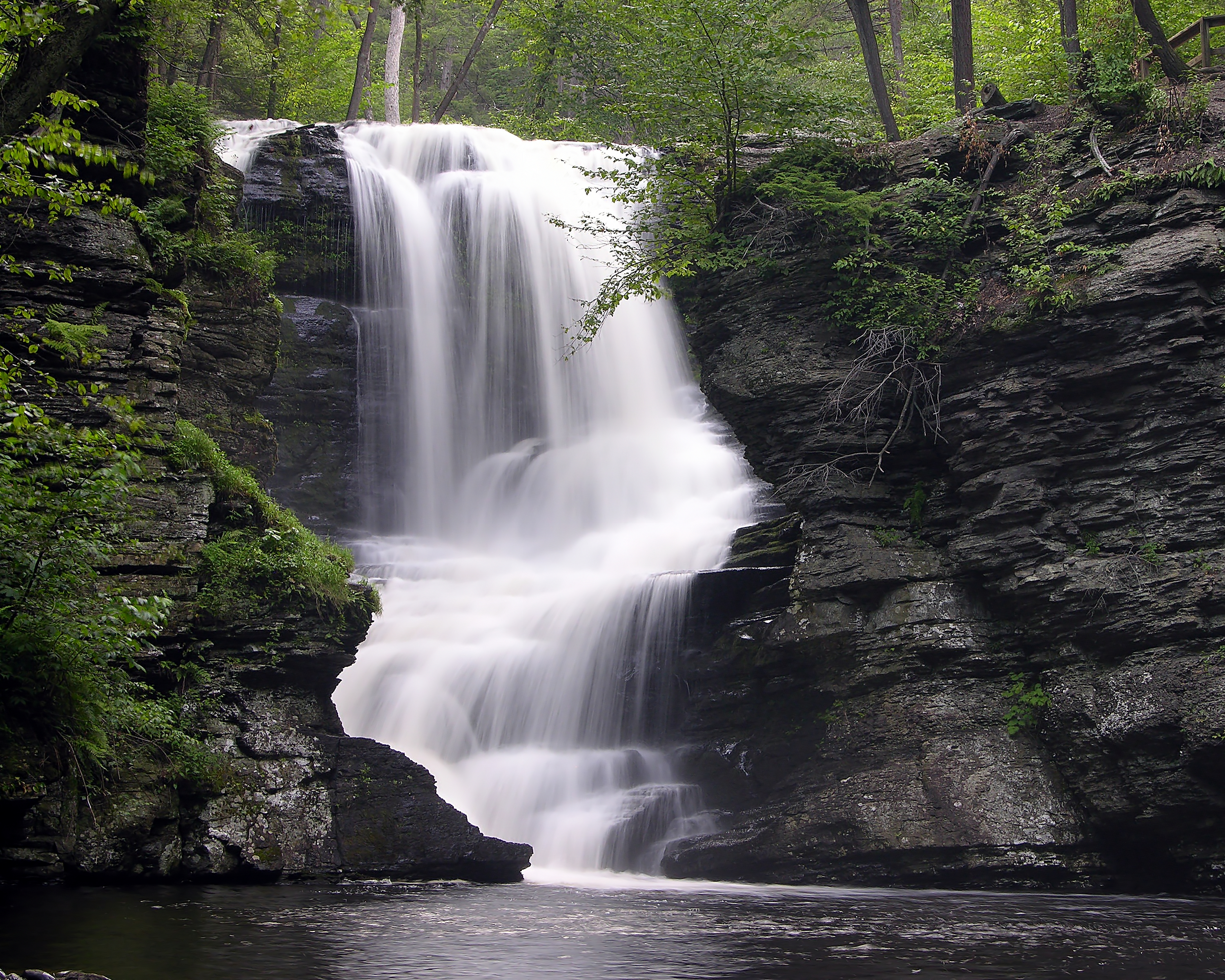
Childs Recreation Site, Fulmer Falls

== Other names of former parks ==
The following are significantly different former or alternate names for two former Pennsylvania state parks. One former park dropped one word from its name ("Colerain Forge" became "Colerain" sometime between 1924 and 1937). Such minor name changes are not included in this table.

Former or alternate names of former Pennsylvania state parks
| Former or alternate name | County or counties | Date name changed | Former park name | Remarks |
|---|---|---|---|---|
| Braddock Grave State Park | Fayette County | 1961 | Part of Fort Necessity State Park | Now part of Fort Necessity National Battlefield (National Park Service) |
| Hairy John's State Forest Park | Centre County | unknown | Voneida State Forest Park | Now a State Forest Picnic Area in Bald Eagle State Forest (Pennsylvania Bureau of Forestry), it was originally named for "Hairy John" Voneida, a 19th-century hermit who lived nearby. |

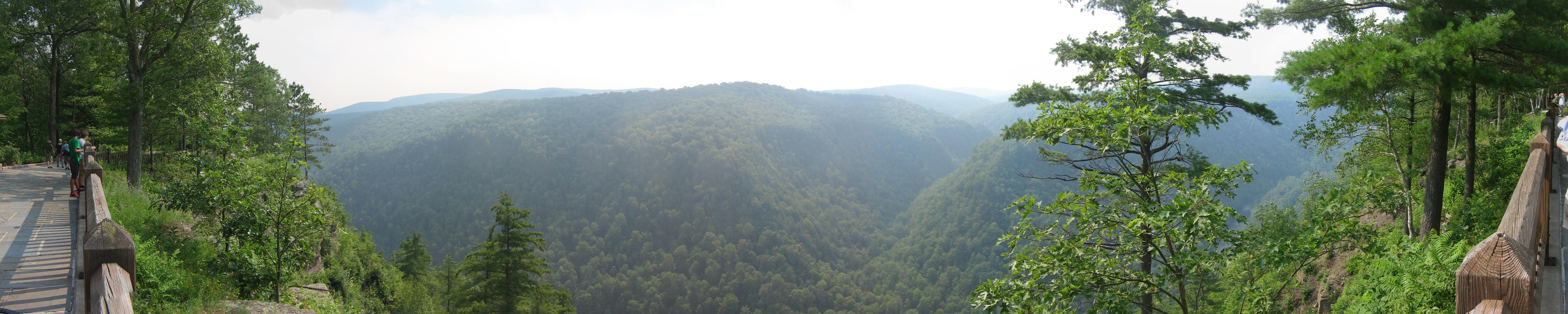
Panoramic view of the Pine Creek Gorge from the main vista terrace in Leonard Harrison State Park

== See also ==
- List of Pennsylvania state forests
- Pennsylvania Fish and Boat Commission
- Pennsylvania Scenic Rivers

== Notes ==
a. As of 2012, three Pennsylvania state parks are also the site of ski areas run by private contractors: Big Pocono (Ski Camelback), Blue Knob (Ski Blue Knob), and Denton Hill (Ski Denton). (Two other state parks had commercial ski operations in the past Laurel Mountain (from 1939 to 2005) and Black Moshannon (from 1965 to 1982).) Two parks are operated by other governmental bodies: Hillman (managed for hunting by the Pennsylvania Game Commission) and Norristown Farm (operated by the Montgomery County Department of Parks). Three parks are operated by other organizations: Susquehanna (operated by the Williamsport/Lycoming Chamber of Commerce), Prompton (operated by non-profit "Friends of Prompton"), and Salt Springs (operated by non-profit "Friends of Salt Springs").
b. The Pennsylvania counties without state parks as of 2023 are: Armstrong, Juniata, Lehigh, Montour, and Snyder counties. Two of these counties are sites of former state parks: Crooked Creek in Armstrong County, and Snyder-Middleswarth in Snyder County.
c. The goal of having a state park within 25 miles (40 km) of every resident was set by Maurice K. Goddard (Secretary of the Pennsylvania Department of Forests and Waters, and then of the Department of Environmental Resources from 1955 to 1979).
d. The seven National Natural Landmarks at least partly within current state parks (with the park name in parentheses, if different) are: Cook Forest, Ferncliff Peninsula (Ohiopyle), the Glens Natural Area (Ricketts Glen), Hickory Run Boulder Field (Hickory Run), McConnells Mill, the Pine Creek Gorge (includes Colton Point and Leonard Harrison), and Presque Isle. One National Natural Landmark, Snyder Middleswarth Natural Area, is a former state park.
e. The date of establishment for many Pennsylvania state parks is not always clear, especially for parks developed from state forest property. As an example, consider Upper Pine Bottom, which, as of 2012, is a picnic area surrounded by Tiadaghton State Forest. These state forest lands were acquired by the state by the early 1900s, the site was "Upper Pine Bottom Class B Public Campground" by 1924, the CCC built a pavilion there in 1936 (which is no longer extant), but it was not officially transferred from the Bureau of Forests to State Parks until 1962.
f. This park was one of twenty-five chosen by the Pennsylvania Bureau of Parks for its "25 Must-See Pennsylvania State Parks" list.
g. This park has one or more historic sites or districts on the National Register of Historic Places.
h. There have been a considerable number of changes in Pennsylvania's categorization of its state parks and other protected areas over the years, so that what can be called a former state park is not always clear. This can be seen by comparing the following three lists from 1923, 1924, and 1937.
In 1923, the Pennsylvania Department of Forests and Waters listed seven "State Forest Parks": Caledonia, Childs (now part of Delaware Water Gap National Recreation Area), Hairy John's (now a picnic area in Bald Eagle State Forest), James Buchanan, Leonard Harrison, Mont Alto, and Valhalla (now Ole Bull). Note this does not include Snyder-Middleswarth State Forest Park, established in 1921.
One year later the state listed twenty-six public campgrounds in state forests, which included three of the previous year's state forest parks, plus twelve sites that later became state parks. The ten Class A Public Campgrounds (with space for cars and tents, on main highways) were: Adams Falls (now Linn Run), Big Spring, Caledonia, Childs, Colerain Forge, Darling Run, Laurel Run Park, Ole Bull, Promised Land, and Tea Springs. The sixteen Class B Public Campgrounds (lean-to shelter, on secondary roads) were: Baldwin, Bear Valley, Cherry Springs Drive, Clear Creek, Donnelly, Joyce Kilmer, Kansas, Kooser, Laurel Hill Summit (now Laurel Summit), Laurel Lake Park, Locusts, McCall's Dam, Ravensburg, Sizerville, Sulphur Springs, and Upper Pine Bottom.
In 1937, the state published a brochure listing the following forty-nine protected areas: six State Parks (Caledonia, Childs, Cook Forest, Presque Isle, Pymatuning, and Ralph Stover); eight State Monuments (Bushy Run, Conrad Weiser, Drake Well, Fort Necessity, Fort Washington, James Buchanan, Valley Forge, and Washington Crossing); ten Forest Recreational Reserves (Clear Creek, Colton Point, Cowans Gap, Kooser Lake, Parker Dam, Pecks Pond, Promised Land Lake, Snow Hill, Whipple Dam, Whirl's End); sixteen Wayside Areas (Big Spring, Black Moshannon, Cherry Spring, Colerain, Greenwood Furnace, Halfway (now R.B. Winter), Joyce Kilmer, Kettle Creek, Mont Alto, Pine Grove Furnace, Reeds Gap, S.B. Elliott, Sideling Hill, Sizerville, and Tea Spring); seven Forest Monuments (Alan Seeger, Bear Meadows, Ole Bull, Detweiler Run, McConnell Narrows, Mount Logan, and Snyder-Middleswarth); and three State Forest Lookouts (Leonard Harrison, Martins Hill, and Mount Riansares).
Only twelve of the twenty-six public campgrounds from 1924 are on the 1937 list. Of the forty-nine areas on the 1937 list, twenty-eight are state parks as of 2012, while nine are former state parks, and twelve are in state forests (eight of these still retain their names as state forest picnic, natural or wild areas).
