= Vosburg Neck State Park =

State park in Pennsylvania, United States

- Interactive map of Vosburg Neck; State Park
- Location: Wyoming County, Pennsylvania, United States
- Coordinates: 41°33′01″N 76°00′35″W
- Area: 667 acres (270 ha)
- Established: 2022
- Administrator: Pennsylvania Department of Conservation and Natural Resources
- Website: Official website
- Pennsylvania State Parks

Vosburg Neck State Park, previously Howland Preserve, is a 667 acres (270 ha) Pennsylvania state park in Wyoming County, Pennsylvania within an oxbow on the north branch of the Susquehanna River known as Vosburg Neck. Vosburg Neck State Park was established in 2022 and provides public access for water-based recreation. The park is located 5 miles west of Tunkhannock, Pennsylvania. It was the first state park established in Wyoming County.

== Recreation ==
Recreational opportunities within the park include boating, hiking, cross-country skiing, mountain biking, and wildlife watching. The North Branch Susquehanna is popular for kayaks, canoes, and paddleboards. There is a boat launch. In Vosburg Neck State Park, there are 7 miles (11 km) of trails, with a mix of easier and more challenging hiking routes. Some trails are also open to cross-country skiing or mountain biking.

== Wildlife ==
Vosburg Neck State Park is habitat for bird species including migrating birds and Eagles. In the spring, vernal pools in the park are the breeding grounds of wood frogs and salamanders.

== See also ==
- List of Pennsylvania state parks
