= Big Elk Creek State Park =

State park in Pennsylvania, United States

- Interactive map of Big Elk Creek; State Park
- Location: Chester County, Pennsylvania, United States
- Coordinates: 39°43′51″N 75°50′08″W
- Area: 1,800 acres (730 ha)
- Established: 2022
- Administrator: Pennsylvania Department of Conservation and Natural Resources
- Named for: Big Elk Creek
- Website: Official website
- Pennsylvania State Parks

Big Elk Creek State Park is a 1,800 acres (730 ha) Pennsylvania state park in southern Chester County, Pennsylvania. Big Elk Creek State Park was established in 2022 and is a wildlife corridor consisting of previous farmlands and forest lands. Its namesake, Big Elk Creek, is a stream that traverses the park. The park lies less than 10 miles northwest of Newark, Delaware and connects to the trail network of Maryland's Fairhill Natural Resource Area.

== Recreation ==
Recreational opportunities within the park include fishing, hiking, horseback riding, and wildlife watching. Big Elk Creek is designated as a High-Quality Stream for its excellent water quality. The creek is stocked with trout. A 3-mile network of existing trails connect Big Elk Creek State park to the trail network of Maryland's Fairhill Natural Resource Area. Equestrian riding is permitted on both Springlawn and Mt. Olivet trails, though parking for equestrian trailers is limited.

== Wildlife ==
Bald eagles, osprey, hawks, and songbirds are residents of the park. The park is also home to mammals like white-tailed deer, minks, coyotes, reptiles like snapping turtles and snakes, and amphibians like frogs, toads, and salamanders.
