= Varden Conservation Area =

State park in Wayne County, Pennsylvania

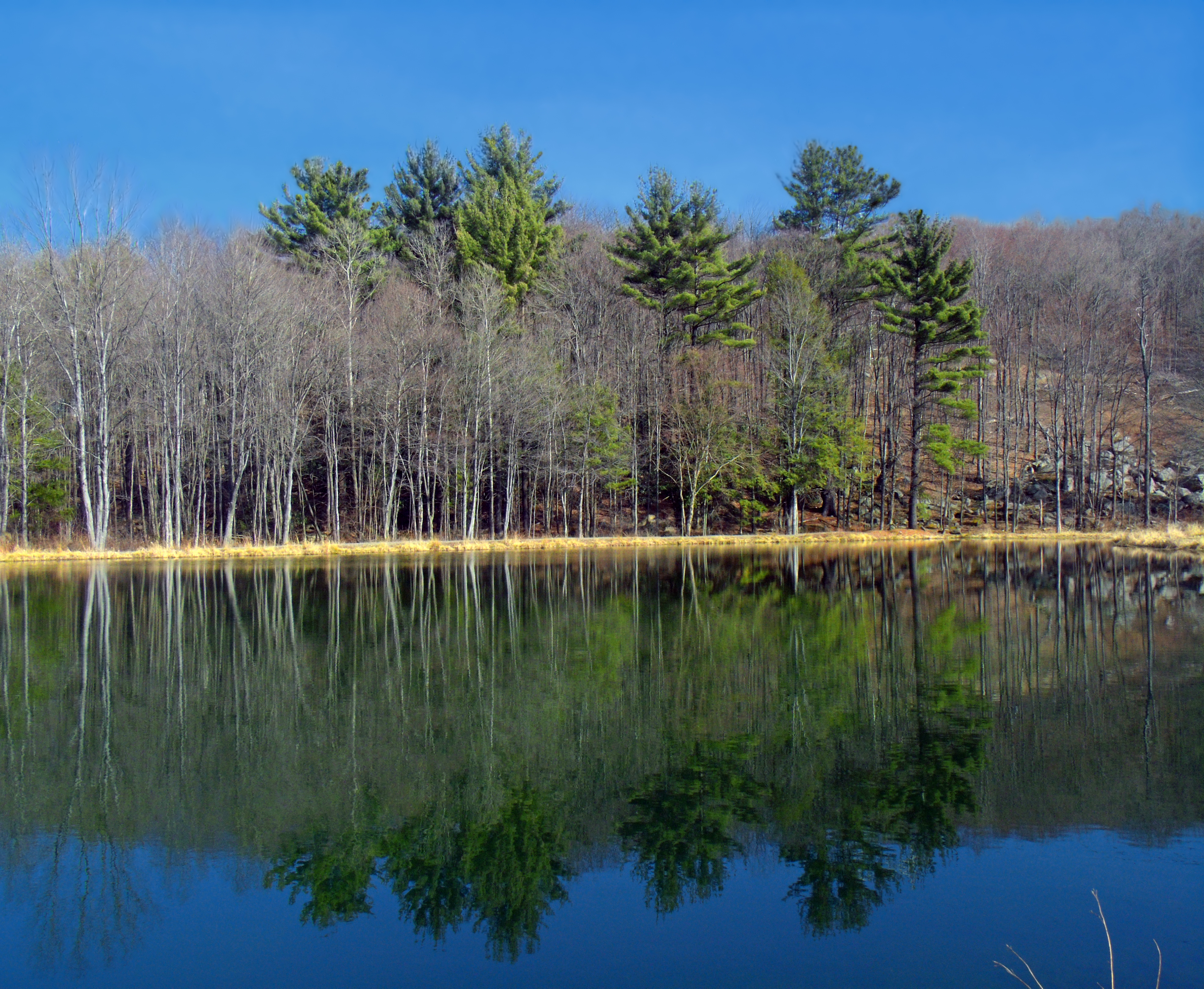

- Location within Pennsylvania Location within the United States
- Interactive map of Varden Conservation Area
- Location: Wayne County, Pennsylvania, United States
- Coordinates: 41°29′15″N 75°22′57″W
- Area: 444 acres (180 ha)
- Elevation: 1,253 feet (382 m)
- Established: 2001
- Administrator: Pennsylvania Department of Conservation and Natural Resources
- Website: Official website
- Pennsylvania State Parks

Varden Conservation Area is a Pennsylvania state park on 444 acres (180 ha) in Lake and South Canaan Townships, Wayne County, Pennsylvania in the United States. The conservation area is currently under development. The land was donated to the Commonwealth of Pennsylvania in December 2001 by Dr. Mead Shaffer a veterinarian and resident of Boothwyn, Pennsylvania in Delaware County. Dr. Shaffer stated his reason for donating the land, "Environmental education always has been a primary concern of mine. I trust this land will allow present and future generations to observe and study the diverse ecology found in the Varden Conservation Area." Varden Conservation Area is near the unincorporated village of Varden on Pennsylvania Route 296, east of the Lackawanna County line.

A conservation area is different from a typical state park. Conservation areas have much less development on the lands than a state park. They are large tracts of land with few improvements, a lack of through roads and the recreational facilities are minimal. There is an effort to manage the resources with minimal development of the park. Other conservation areas in Pennsylvania are the Joseph E. Ibberson Conservation Area and the Boyd Big Tree Preserve Conservation Area both of which are in Dauphin County.
