= Benjamin Rush State Park =

State park in Pennsylvania, United States

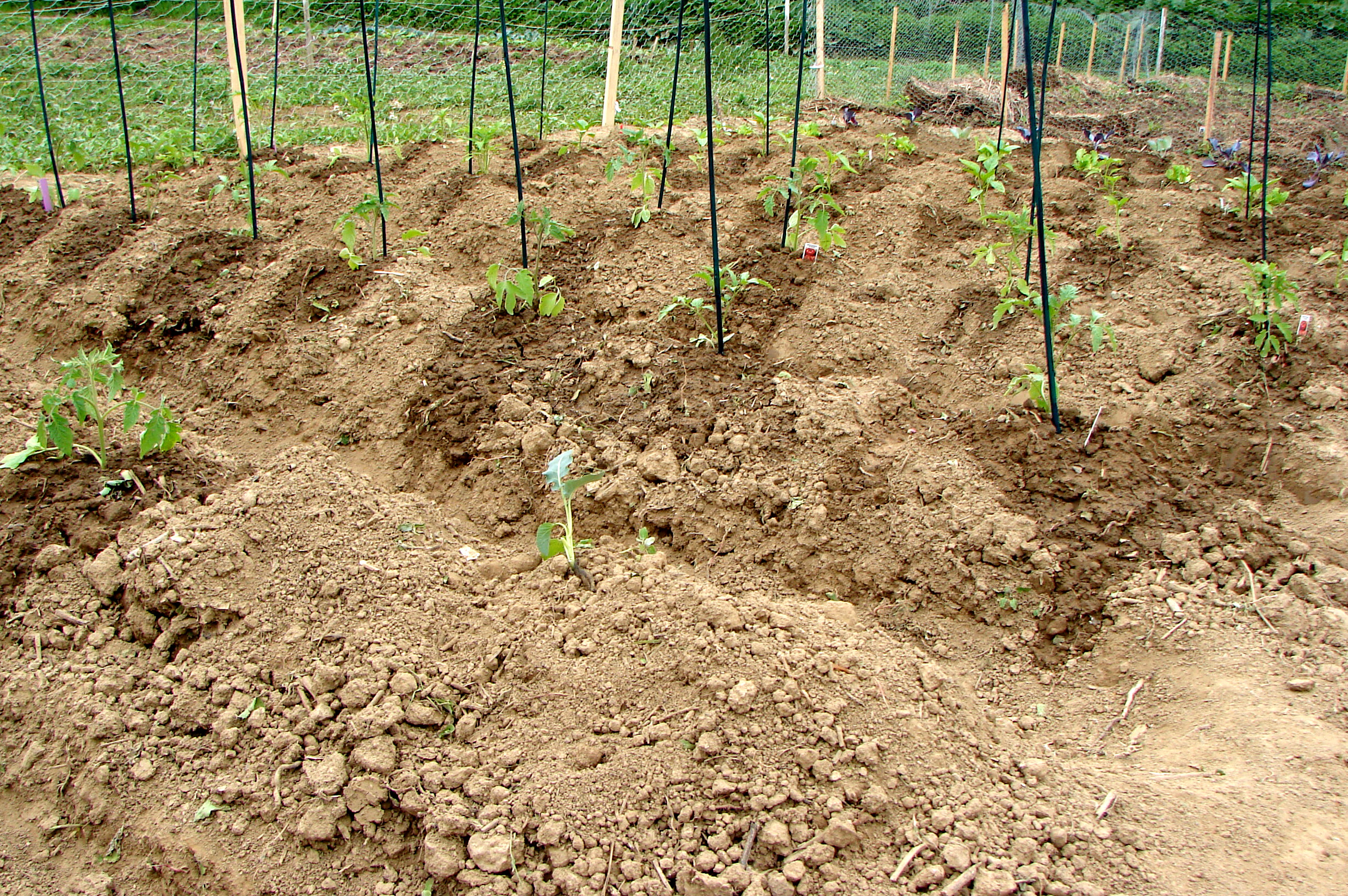
- A small plot in the community gardens of Benjamin Rush State Park

- Location within Pennsylvania Location within the United States
- Interactive map of Benjamin Rush State Park
- Location: Philadelphia, Pennsylvania, United States
- Coordinates: 40°06′46″N 74°59′11″W
- Area: 275 acres (111 ha)
- Elevation: 118 ft (36 m)
- Established: 1975
- Administrator: Pennsylvania Department of Conservation and Natural Resources
- Named for: Benjamin Rush
- Website: Official website
- Pennsylvania State Parks

Benjamin Rush State Park is a 275-acre (111 ha) Pennsylvania state park in Philadelphia, Philadelphia County, Pennsylvania, in the United States. The park is undeveloped and is the site of community gardens, believed to be one of the largest in the world. The park is home to the Northeast Radio Controlled Airplane Club. Benjamin Rush State Park is in Northeast Philadelphia at the intersection of Southampton Road and Roosevelt Boulevard (U.S. Route 1). The northern boundary of the park is formed by Poquessing Creek. There are several acres of woodlands along the creek bank. A proposal map show plans to connect the park with Fairmount Park. Other proposed improvements included hiking trails, parking facilities, and a reforestation project. The community gardens and airfield for the radio-controlled aircraft would remain.

== See also ==
- Benjamin Rush
- List of parks in Philadelphia
