= Laurel Summit State Park =

State park in Pennsylvania, United States

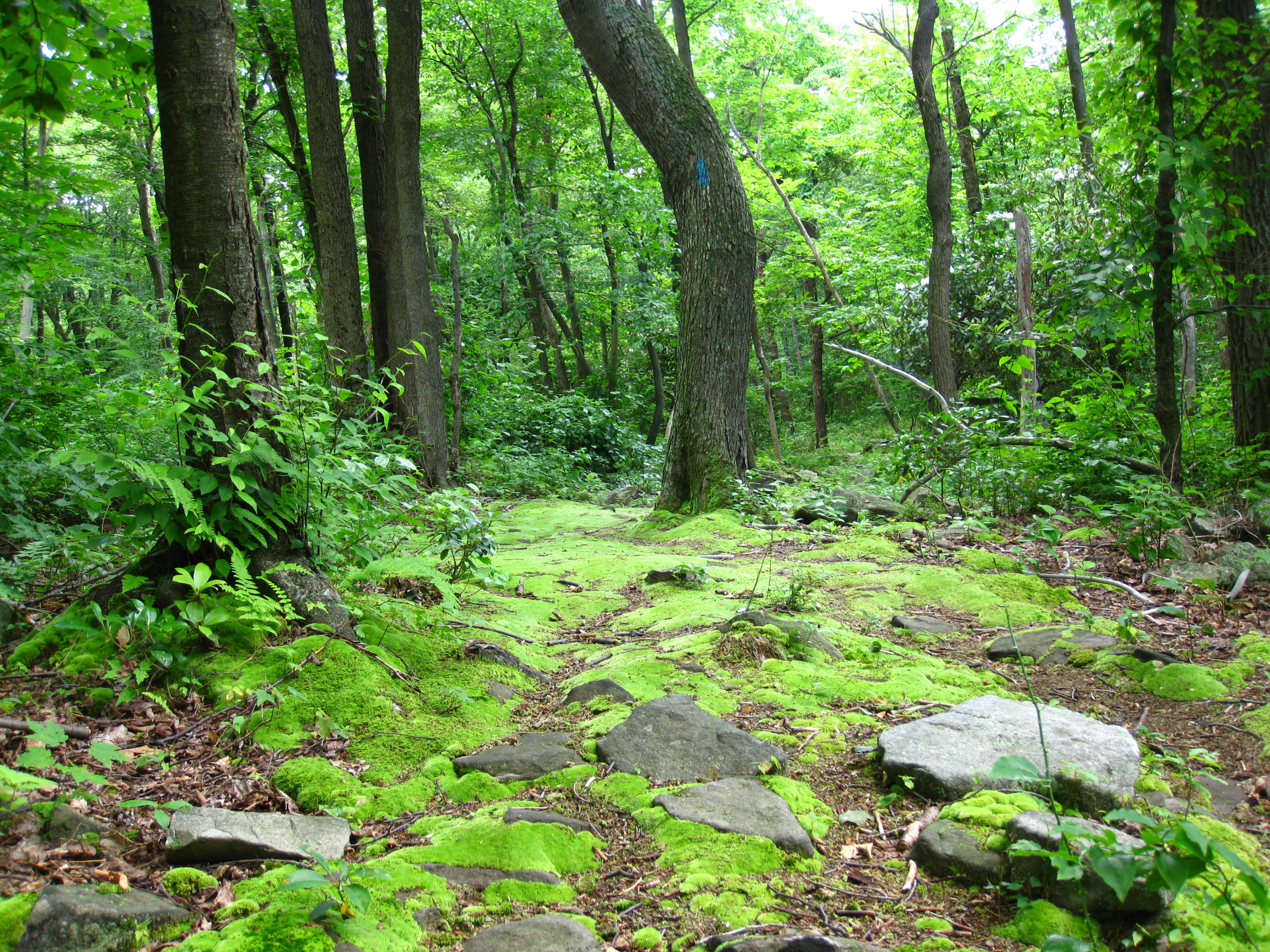
- Wolf Rock Loop

- Location within Pennsylvania Location within the United States
- Interactive map of Laurel Summit State Park
- Location: Cook Township, Westmoreland County, Pennsylvania, United States
- Coordinates: 40°09′39″N 79°08′57″W
- Area: 6 acres (2.4 ha)
- Elevation: 2,739 feet (835 m)
- Established: 1964
- Administrator: Pennsylvania Department of Conservation and Natural Resources
- Website: Official website
- Pennsylvania State Parks

Laurel Summit State Park is a 6-acre (2.4 ha) Pennsylvania state park in Cook Township, Westmoreland County, Pennsylvania in the United States. It is also a picnic area with a scenic view of Linn Run on the summit of Laurel Mountain. The temperatures at Laurel Summit State Park are generally several degrees cooler than the surrounding towns in the valleys. The elevation of the park is 2,739 feet (835 m) above sea level.

The area in and surrounding Laurel Summit State Park is now a thriving second growth forest. One hundred years ago it was generally described as a "waste land". The ridges of the Laurel Mountain had once been covered with old-growth forest. These forests were clear cut during the lumber era that swept over most of the mountains and forests of Pennsylvania during the mid-to-late 19th century and very early 20th century. The lumbermen stripped the mountains. They took the logs to the sawmill where they were cut into lumber. Smaller logs were used to reinforce the mine shafts of the many coal mines throughout southwestern Pennsylvania and West Virginia. The bark of the hemlock tree was used as a source of tannin at the tanneries of the area. The only thing the lumbermen left behind was the treetops. These tree tops were left to dry. The passing steam locomotives of the Pittsburgh, Westmoreland and Somerset Railroad would ignite this dry brush causing massive wildfires that swept through the mountains and valleys. In 1909, after the Commonwealth of Pennsylvania had purchased the land from the lumbermen, Forester John R. Williams reported, "I should say that fully three-fifths (60%) of the reserve had been burned since the lumbering was done. The fires did great damage to the young growth. Some places were covered with nothing but ferns and blackberry bushes." Scars from these fires can still be seen today in the Laurel Summit vicinity.

Most of the wildlife in the area was devastated due to the destruction of their habitat or over hunting. White-tailed deer were imported from Michigan and New York to reestablish what had once been a thriving population of deer. These deer were released throughout Pennsylvania. The current population of deer in Pennsylvania are descended from the original stock that was introduced in 1910 after the lumbermen had moved out of the area.
