= Norristown Farm Park =

State park in Pennsylvania, United States

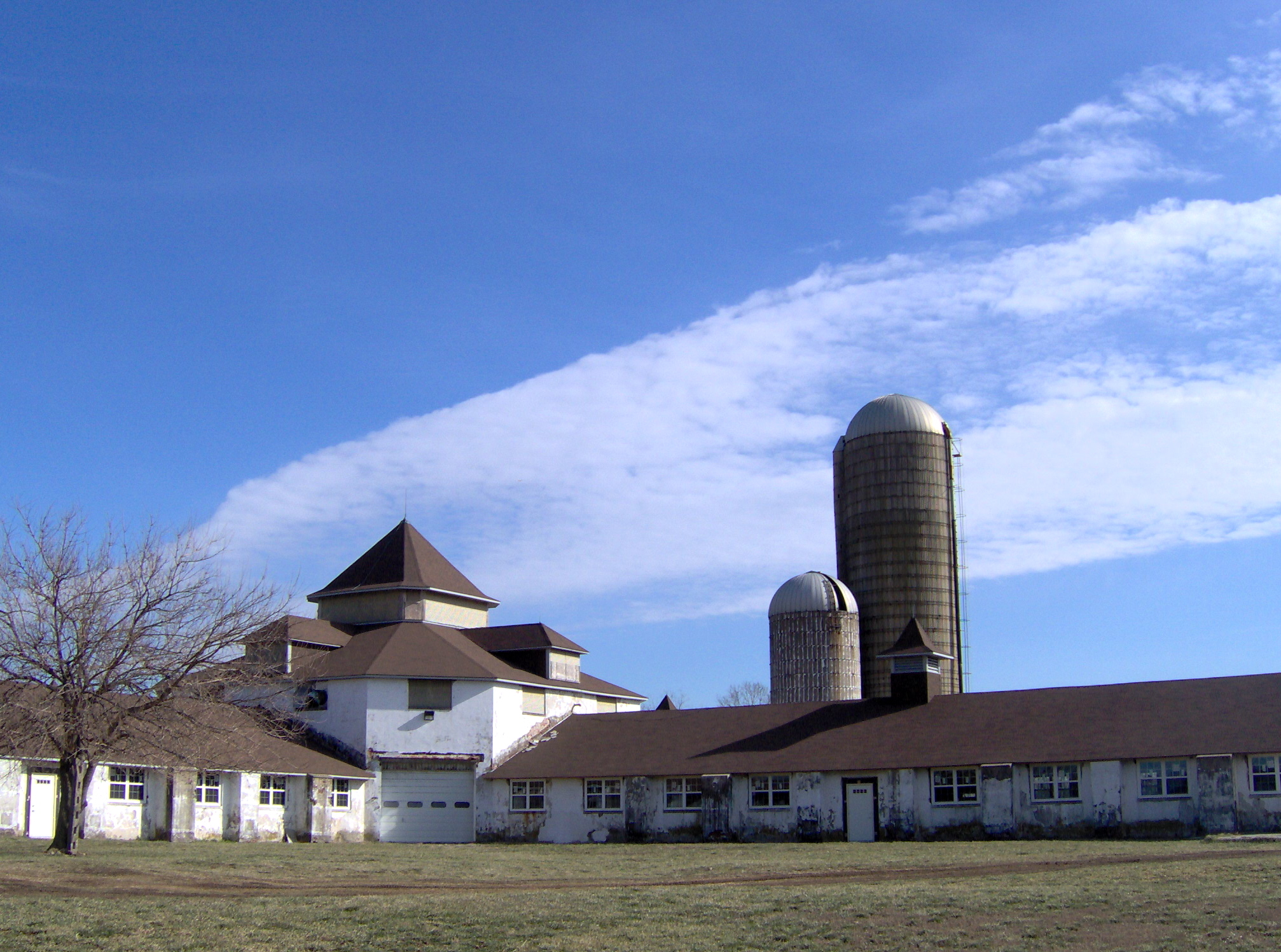

- Location within Pennsylvania Location within the United States
- Interactive map of Norristown Farm Park
- Location: Montgomery County, Pennsylvania, United States
- Coordinates: 40°08′46″N 75°20′30″W
- Area: 690 acres (280 ha)
- Elevation: 1,224 feet (373 m)
- Established: 1995
- Administrator: Pennsylvania Department of Conservation and Natural Resources
- Website: Official website
- Pennsylvania State Parks

Norristown Farm Park is a 690-acre (279 ha) Pennsylvania state park in East Norriton and West Norriton Townships and Norristown in Montgomery County, Pennsylvania, in the United States. Located just off of Interstate 276 on West Germantown Pike, it is operated in partnership with the Montgomery County Department of Parks.

A working farm on the site of Norristown State Hospital, the park has multiple colonial-era farm buildings and homes on its grounds.

Stony Creek flows through the park. Baseball, bicycling, cross-country skiing, hiking, fishing, and picnicking opportunities are available in the park, as are summer musical concerts.

== History ==
Norristown Farm Park was originally part of a 7,000-acre (2,800 ha) tract of land called "Williamstadt," which originally belonged to William Penn. The property was then transferred to Isaac Norris, the namesake of Norristown, by way of Penn's son, William Penn, Jr. Norris's heirs sold pieces of Williamstadt to the Commonwealth of Pennsylvania and Norristown State Hospital was opened in the 1870s as a mental hospital. The park is on state-owned land that surrounds the hospital.

== Gallery ==
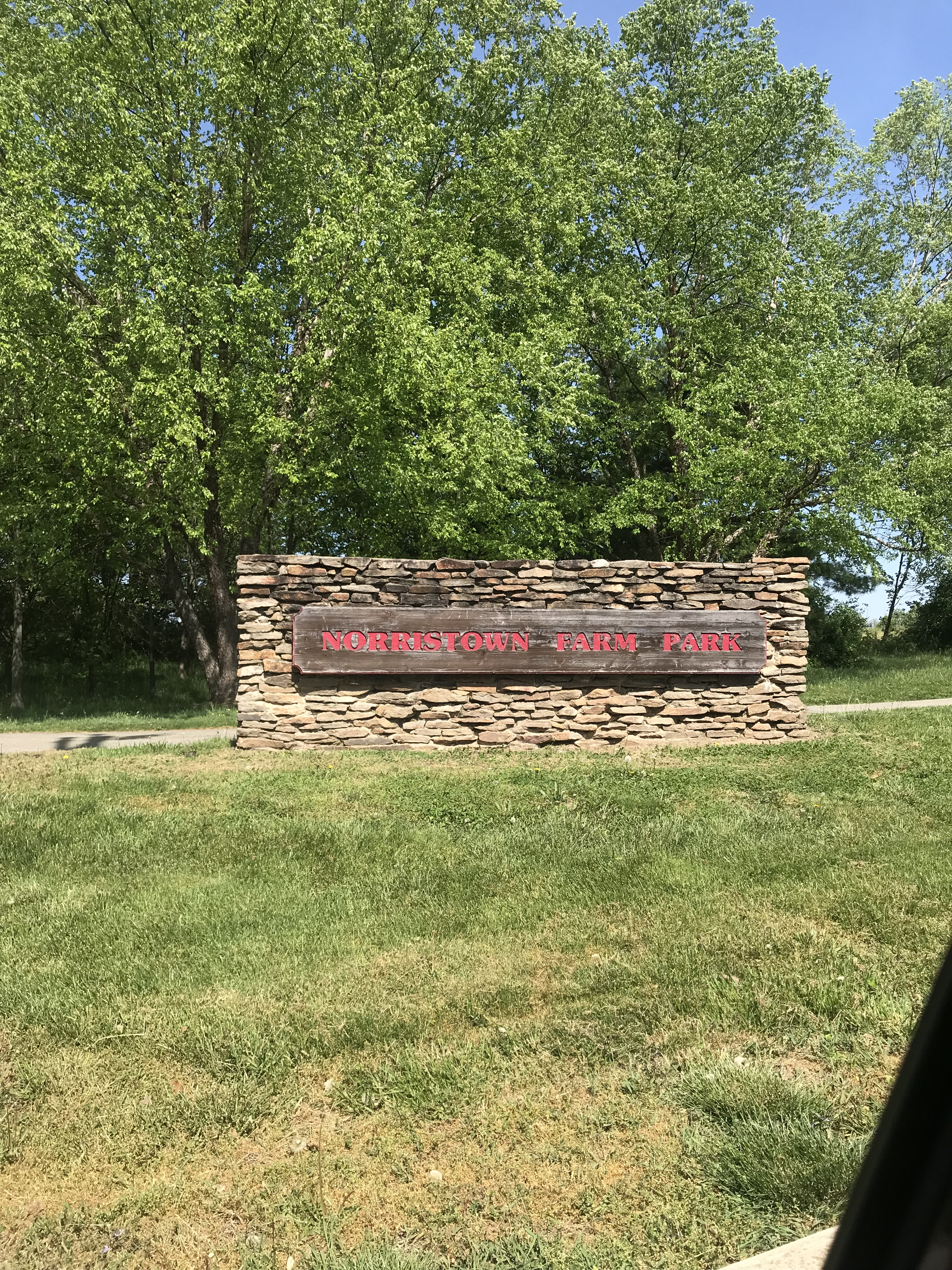
Park sign

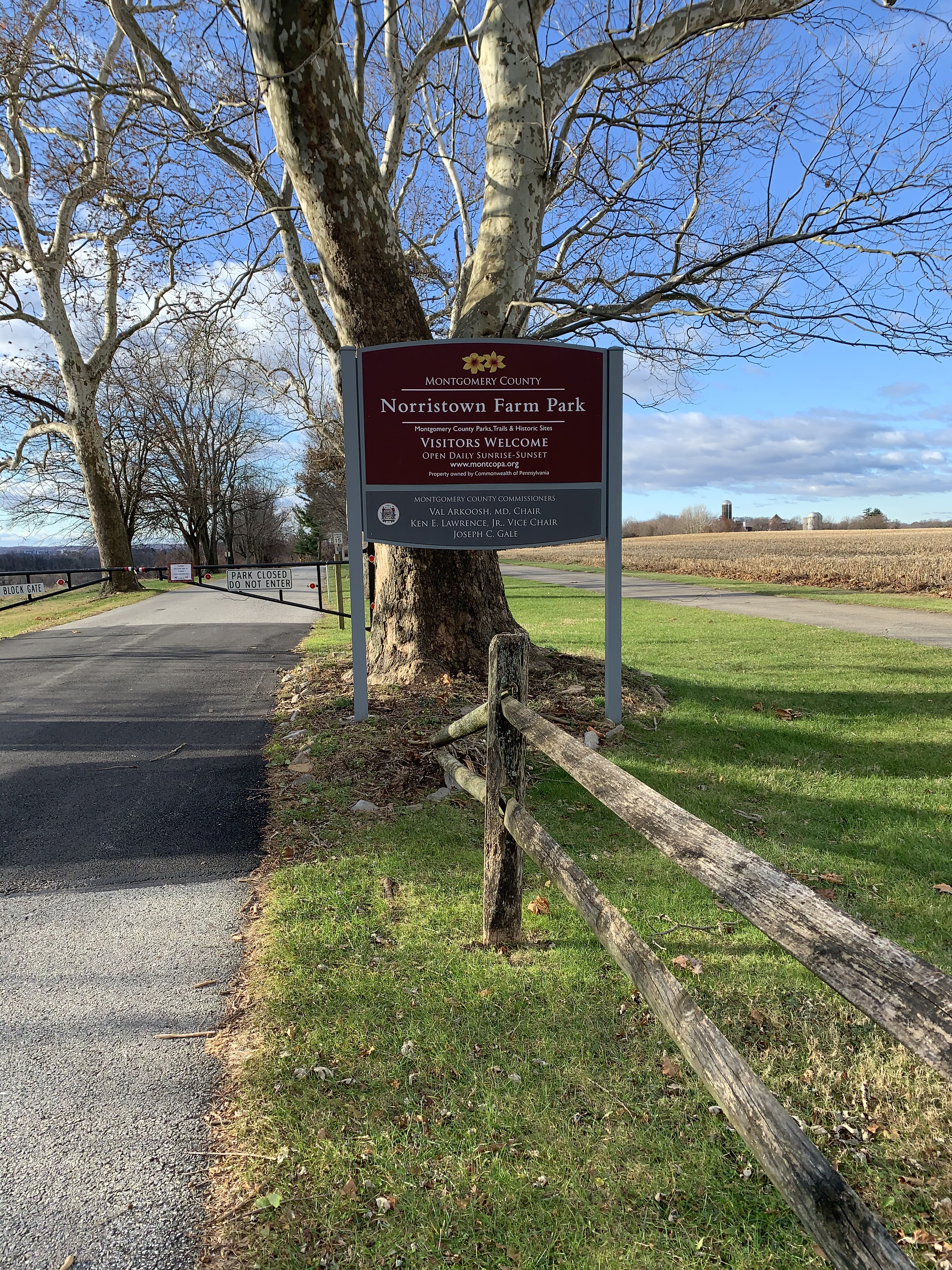
Germantown Pike entrance

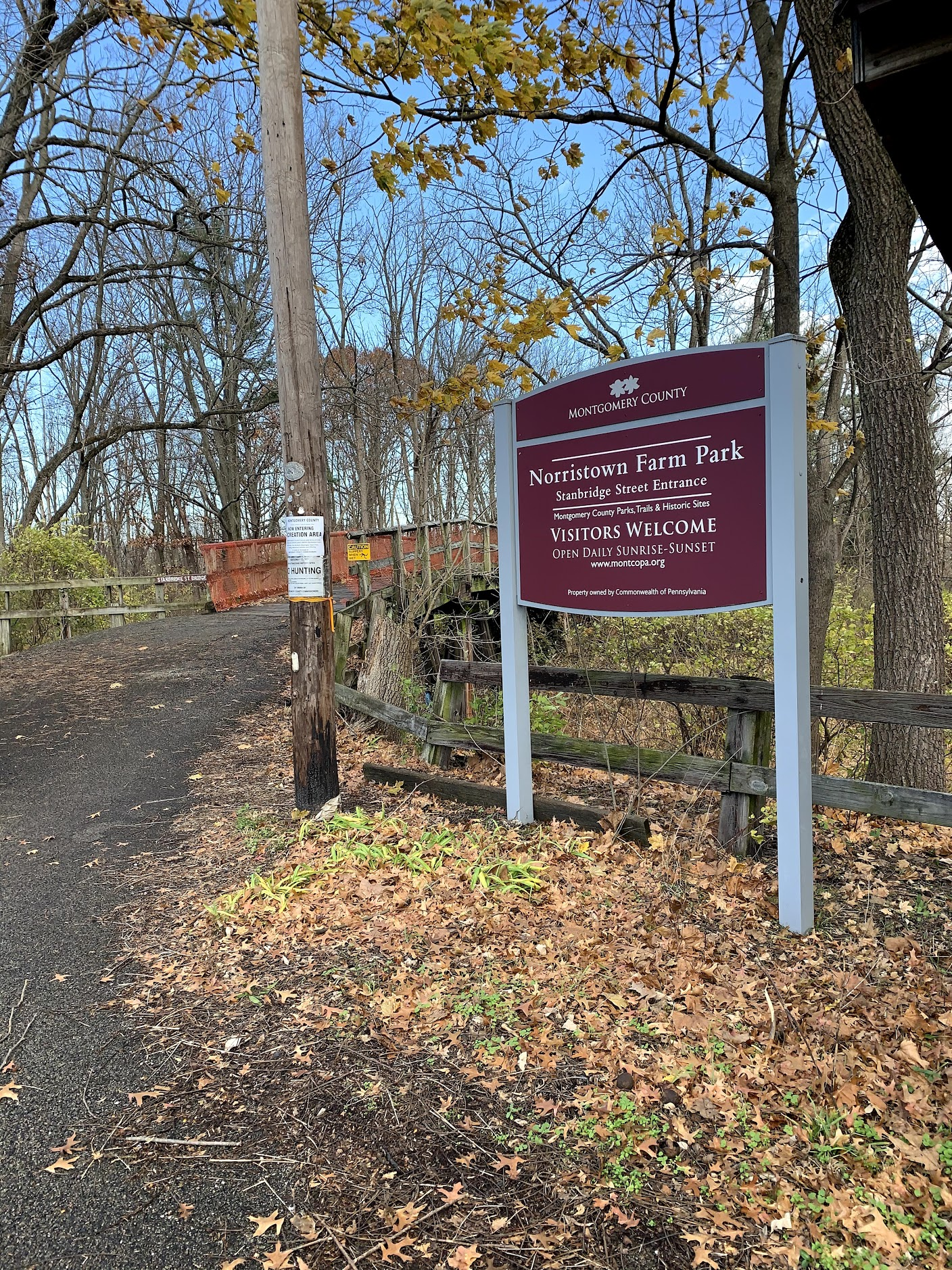
Stanbridge Street entrance
