= Susquehanna Riverlands State Park =

State park in Pennsylvania, United States

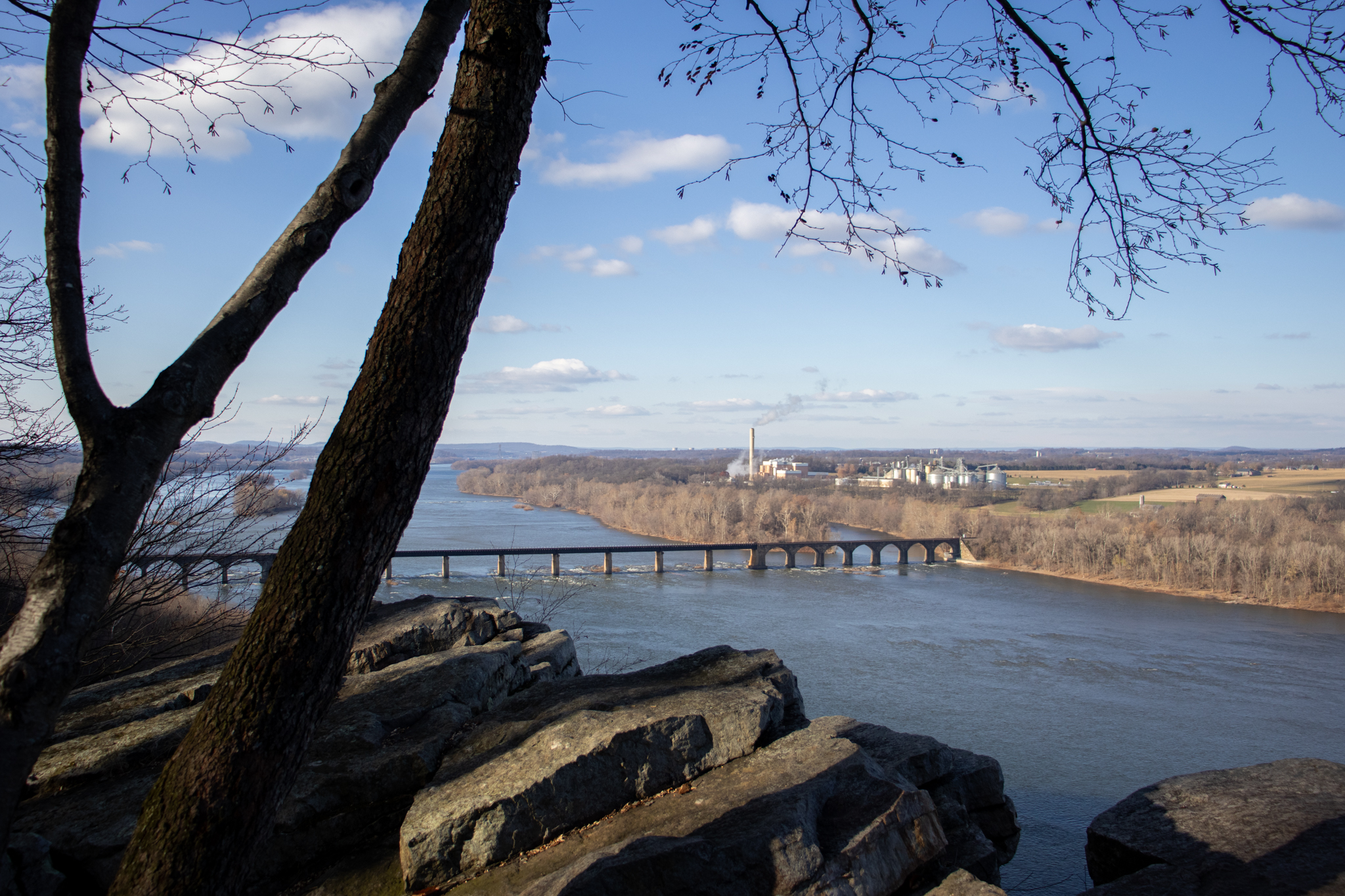
- Overlook at Schull's Rock
- Interactive map of Susquehanna Riverlands; State Park
- Location: York County, Pennsylvania, United States
- Coordinates: 40°02′36″N 76°37′25″W
- Area: 1,044 acres (422 ha)
- Established: 2022
- Administrator: Pennsylvania Department of Conservation and Natural Resources
- Named for: Susquehanna River
- Website: Official website
- Pennsylvania State Parks

Susquehanna Riverlands State Park is a 1,044 acres (422 ha) Pennsylvania state park in York County, Pennsylvania along the confluence of Codorus Creek and the Susquehanna River. Susquehanna Riverlands State Park was established in 2022 and is composed of a largely wooded tract. The park is nearly 6 miles northwest of Wrightsville, Pennsylvania.

== Recreation ==
Recreational opportunities within the park include hiking, wildlife watching, hunting, and boating. Common birds seen include bald eagles, osprey, turkey vultures, and black vultures.

=== Hiking ===
Approximately 2.75 miles (4.43 km) of the Mason-Dixon Trail traverses the park, a 200-mile-long trail connecting the Appalachian Trail at Whiskey Springs with Chadds Ford along the Brandywine River. The other trail in the park, the Overlook Trail, leads to a vista over the Susquehanna River at Schull's Rock.

=== Hunting ===
Hunting and trapping is permitted in the majority of the park. The common game species are white-tailed deer, wild turkey, and eastern gray squirrel. The hunting of groundhogs is prohibited.
