= Boyd Big Tree Preserve Conservation Area =

State park in Dauphin County, Pennsylvania

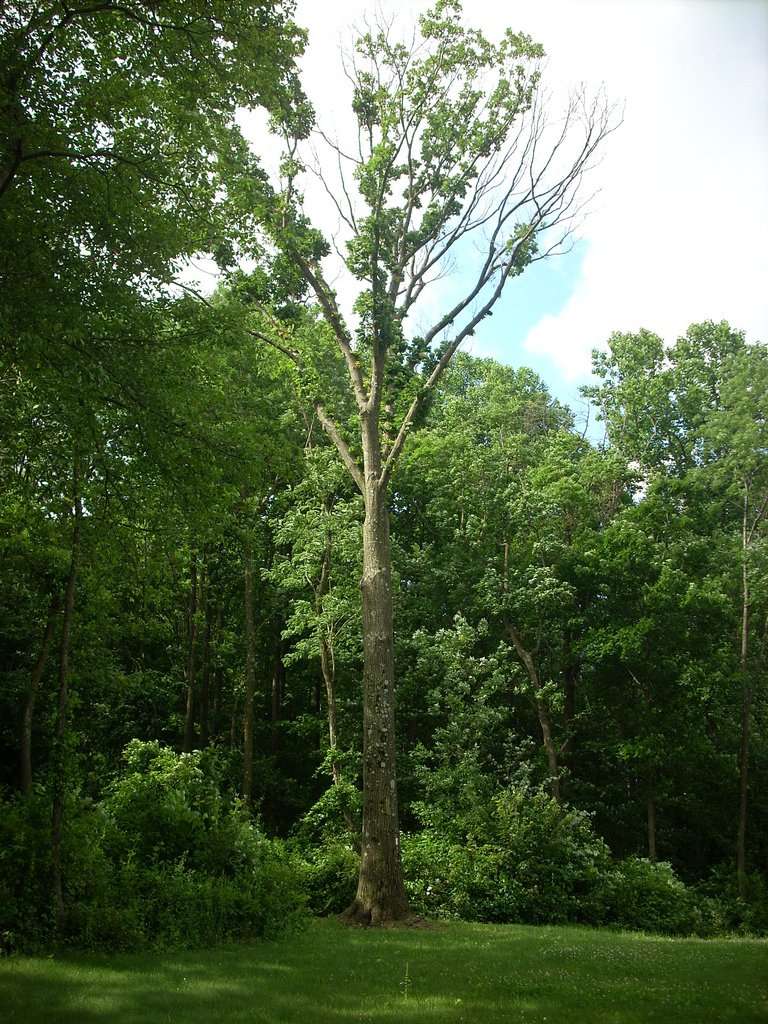

- Location within Pennsylvania Location within the United States
- Interactive map of Boyd Big Tree Preserve; Conservation Area
- Location: Dauphin County, Pennsylvania, United States
- Coordinates: 40°21′33″N 76°52′02″W
- Area: 1,025 acres (415 ha)
- Elevation: 866 ft (264 m)
- Established: 1999
- Administrator: Pennsylvania Department of Conservation and Natural Resources
- Named for: Land donor Alexander Boyd
- Website: Official website
- Pennsylvania State Parks

Boyd Big Tree Preserve Conservation Area is a 1,025-acre (415 ha) Pennsylvania state park in Lower Paxton and Middle Paxton Townships in Dauphin County, Pennsylvania. The land for the conservation area was donated to the state by real estate developer Alex Boyd in 1999. Boyd Big Tree Preserve Conservation Area is a sanctuary for mature trees and an environment education study area. The park is on Blue Mountain just off Pennsylvania Route 443.

== Conservation Area ==
A conservation area is different from a state park. Conservation areas have much less development on the lands than a state park. They are large tracts of land with few improvements, a lack of through roads and the recreational facilities are minimal. There is an effort to manage the resources with minimal development of the park, and camping is not permitted. Other conservation areas in Pennsylvania are the nearby Joseph E. Ibberson Conservation Area and Varden Conservation Area in Wayne County.

== Wildlife ==
The large mature trees and thick woods of Boyd Big Tree Preserve Conservation Area make it and ideal habitat for a large variety of woodland creatures. The park is home to white-tailed deer, black bear, wild turkeys, ruffed grouse and eastern gray squirrels. Bluebirds and warblers can also be observed at Boyd Big Tree Preserve Conservation Area. There is an observation area on Blue Mountain where bird watchers can see the annual migration of hawks.

== Recreation ==
=== Trails ===
All 10.6 miles (17.1 km) of trails at Boyd Big Tree Preserve Conservation Area are open to hiking and cross-country skiing.

- Coach Trail is 0.9 miles (1.4 km) in length. It is marked with yellow blazes and is a designated "easy" trail. Coach Trail runs along the base of Blue Mountain to the western edge of the park.
- Creek Trail is 0.9 miles (1.4 km) in length. It is marked with blue blazes and is a designated "moderate" trail. Creek Trail follows the western edge of the park.
- East Loop Trail is 1.9 miles (3.1 km) in length. It is marked with lime green blazes and is a designated "moderate" trail. East Loop Trail is on the eastern end of the park.
- Janie Trail is 2.5 miles (4.0 km) in length. It is marked with red blazes and is a designated "difficult" trail. Janie Trail is the longest trail in the park and follows the ridgeline and descends the mountain on a steep slope.
- Upper Spring Trail is 2 miles (3.2 km) in length. It is marked with beige blazes and is a designated "moderate" trail. Upper Spring Trail passes by some of the largest and oldest oak, hickory, and beech trees in the park.
- Lower Spring Trail is 1.1 miles (1.8 km) in length. It is marked with lavender blazes and is a designated "easy" trail. Lower Spring Trail passes through the center of the conservation area.
- Pond Loop Trail is 1.2 miles (1.9 km) in length. It is marked with pink blazes and is a designated "easy" trail. Pond Loop Trail circles a spring fed pond that is home to many types of amphibians.

=== Hunting ===
Hunting is permitted on about 800 acres (320 ha) of Boyd Big Tree Preserve Conservation Area. Hunters are expected to follow the rules and regulations of the Pennsylvania Game Commission. The common game species are ruffed grouse, eastern gray squirrel, wild turkey, white-tailed deer, eastern cottontail rabbits and American black bear. The hunting of groundhogs is prohibited.
