= Sandy Creek (Allegheny River tributary) =

River in Pennsylvania

Coordinates: 41.36186°N 79.91688°W

Sandy Creek is a tributary of the Allegheny River in Venango, Mercer and Crawford counties in Pennsylvania in the United States.

Sandy Creek is 41.0 miles (66.0 km) long, flows southeast 24 miles (39 km), then east 16 miles (26 km), and its watershed is 161 square miles (417 km^{2}) in area.

== See also ==
- List of rivers of Pennsylvania
- List of tributaries of the Allegheny River
