= Ridley Creek State Park =

State park in Pennsylvania, U.S.

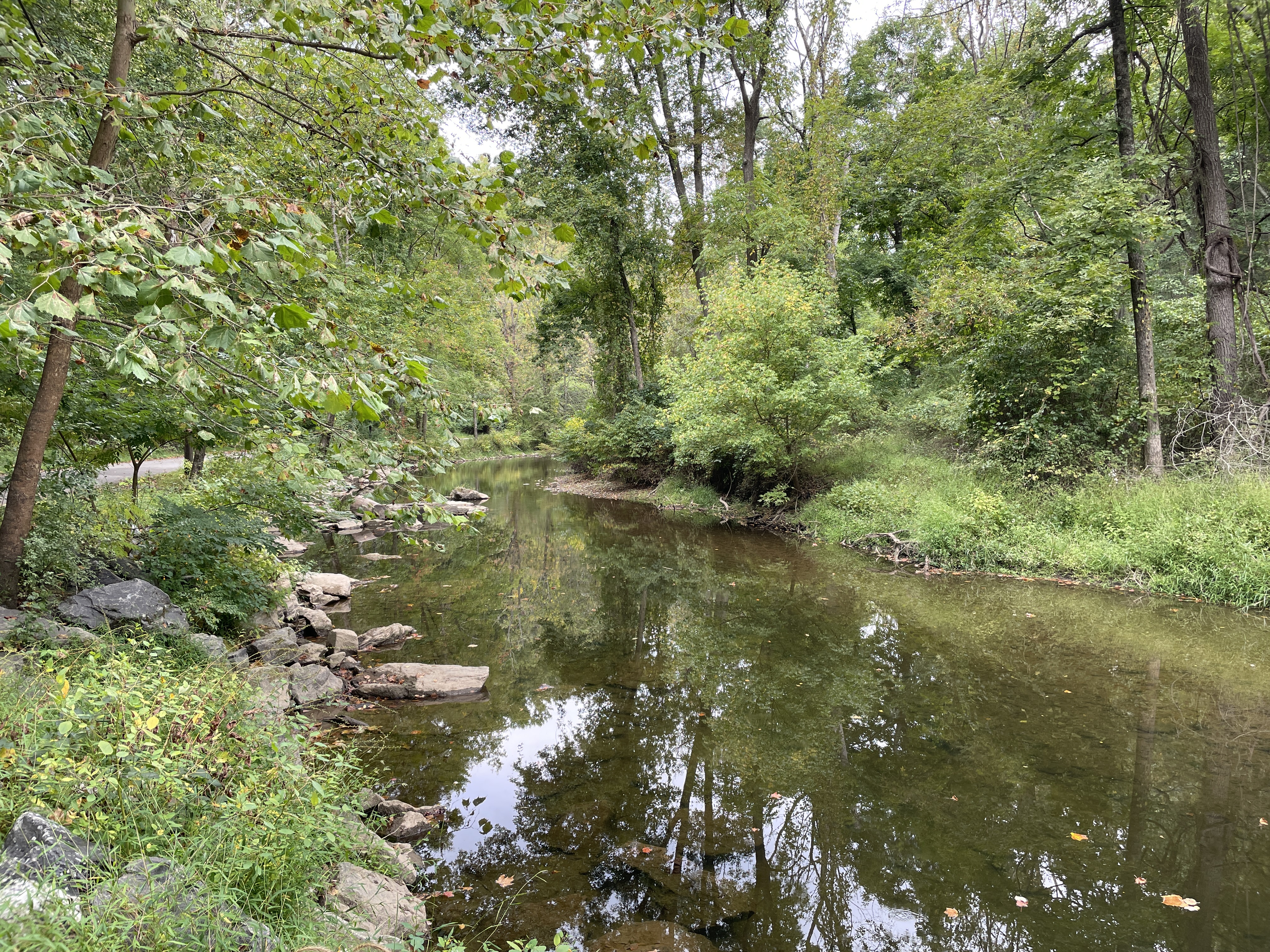
- Ridley Creek

- Location within Pennsylvania Location within the United States
- Interactive map of Ridley Creek State Park
- Location: Delaware County, Pennsylvania, United States
- Coordinates: 39°57′02″N 75°27′06″W
- Area: 2,606 acres (1,055 ha)
- Elevation: 315 feet (96 m)
- Established: 1972
- Administrator: Pennsylvania Department of Conservation and Natural Resources
- Website: Official website
- Pennsylvania State Parks

Ridley Creek State Park is a 2,606-acre (1,055 ha) Pennsylvania state park in Edgmont, Middletown, and Upper Providence Townships, Delaware County, Pennsylvania in the United States. The park, about 5 miles (8 km) north of the county seat of Media, offers many recreational activities, such as hiking, biking, fishing, and picnicking within preserved old-growth forest. Ridley Creek passes through the park. Highlights include a 5-mile (8 km) paved multi-use trail, a formal garden designed by the Olmsted Brothers, and Colonial Pennsylvania Farmstead, which recreates daily life on a pre-Revolutionary farm. The park is adjacent to the John J. Tyler Arboretum. Ridley Creek State Park is just over 16 miles (26 km) from downtown, Philadelphia between Pennsylvania Route 352 and Pennsylvania Route 252 on Gradyville Road.

== History ==
Prior to European settlement, the Ridley Creek State Park area was home to the Lenni Lenape. The area was originally settled by English Quakers and remained agrarian into the twentieth century. The oldest property is the 1683 Worrel House. In 1718 a water mill, then known as Providence Mill, began to grind corn. In the late 18th century a plaster mill was established next to the grist mill. A rolling and slitting mill replaced the plaster mill by 1812, and became known as Bishop's Mills. Workers cottages, a dam, and several outbuildings complete the mill complex, now known as Sycamore Mills. The mills operated until 1901, when they were damaged by fire.

The bulk of the property was acquired into the state park system in the 1960s from the estate of well known horse breeder Walter M. Jeffords Sr. and his wife Sarah, a niece of Samuel D. Riddle. The Jeffords had originally acquired the land starting about 1912 in small parcels, until they had over 2,000 acres (8.1 km^{2}), which was the largest private undeveloped property in the Philadelphia area by the 1960s. By 1918 they had built a large mansion, now the park office, around a stone colonial farmhouse. Twenty-four other historic properties were located on the grounds, many farmsteads that had retained family ownership since the seventeenth century. These properties were acquired by the Pennsylvania State Parks system in the 1960s using "Project 70" funds, with facilities dedicated to public use during August of 1972. In 1976 these properties were registered on the National Register of Historic Places as a national historic district.

In 2024, Ridley Creek State Park was added to the National Old-Growth Forest Network, Pennsylvania's 32nd such woodland added to the registry.

== Colonial Pennsylvania Farmstead ==
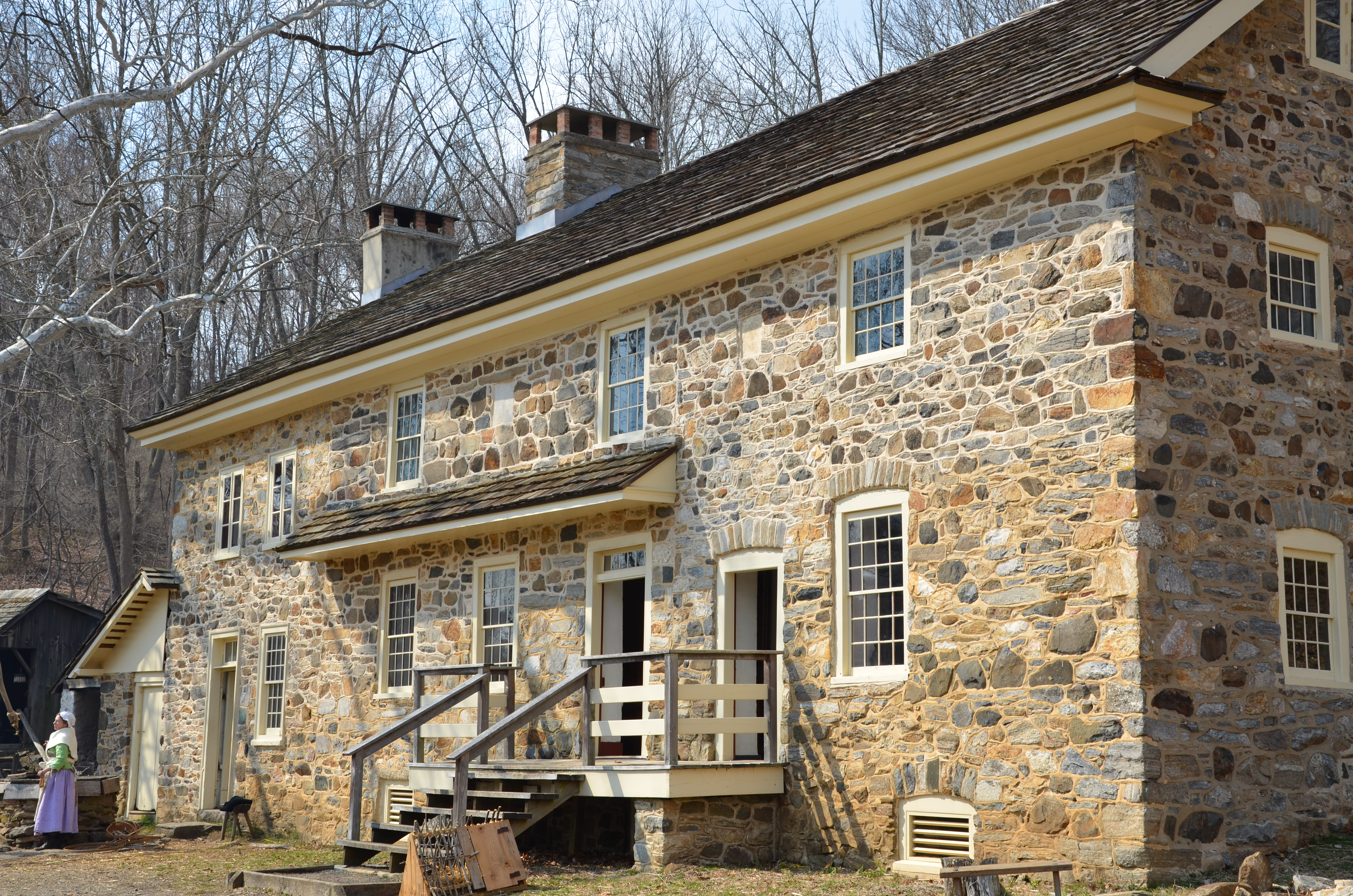
Colonial Pennsylvania Farmstead in the park

The Colonial Pennsylvania Farmstead is a living museum on the 112-acre (0.45 km^{2}) farm where the Pratt family lived from 1720 to 1820. Admission is charged, and it is open to the general public on weekends from April through November.

== Recreation ==
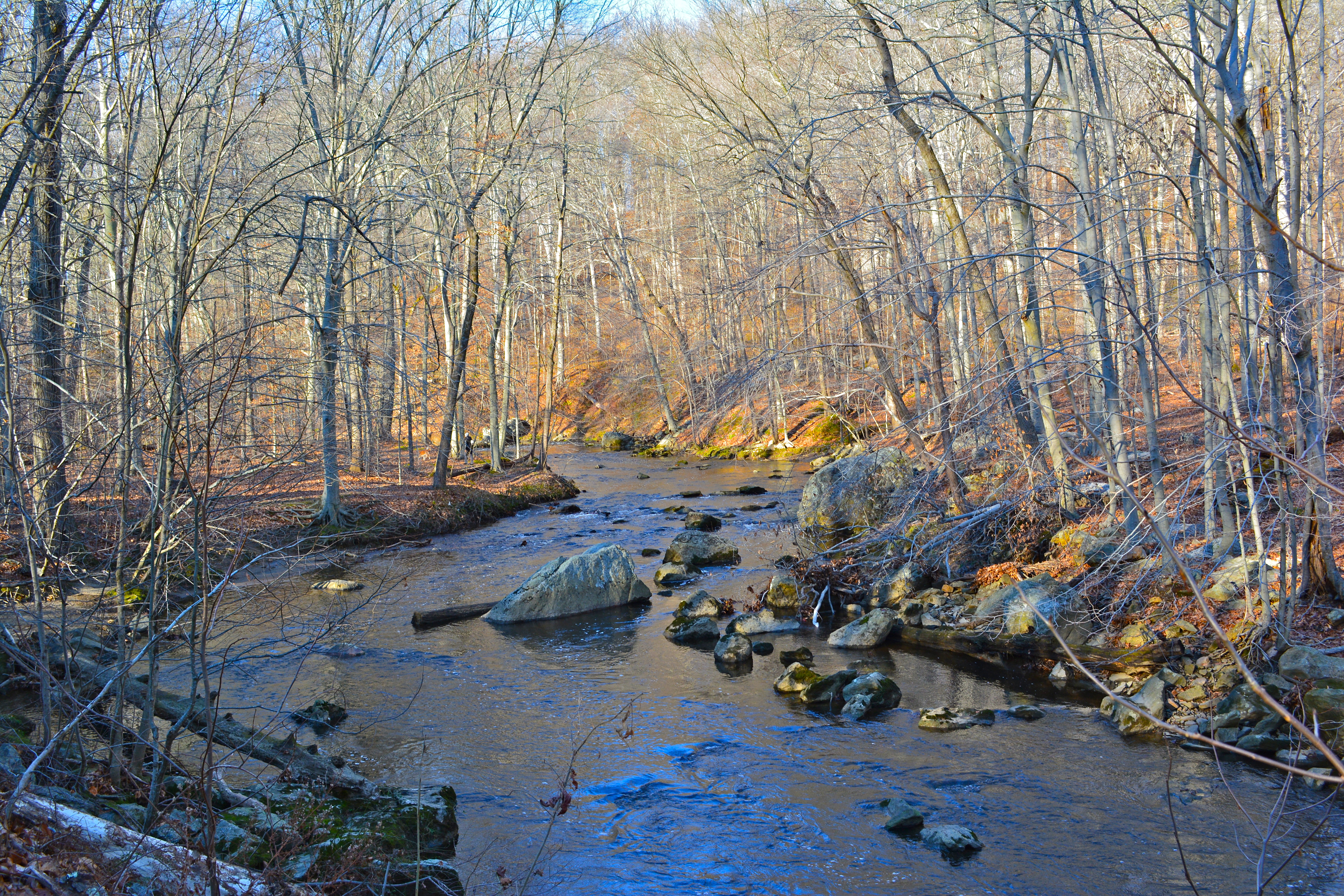
The creek in November 2013

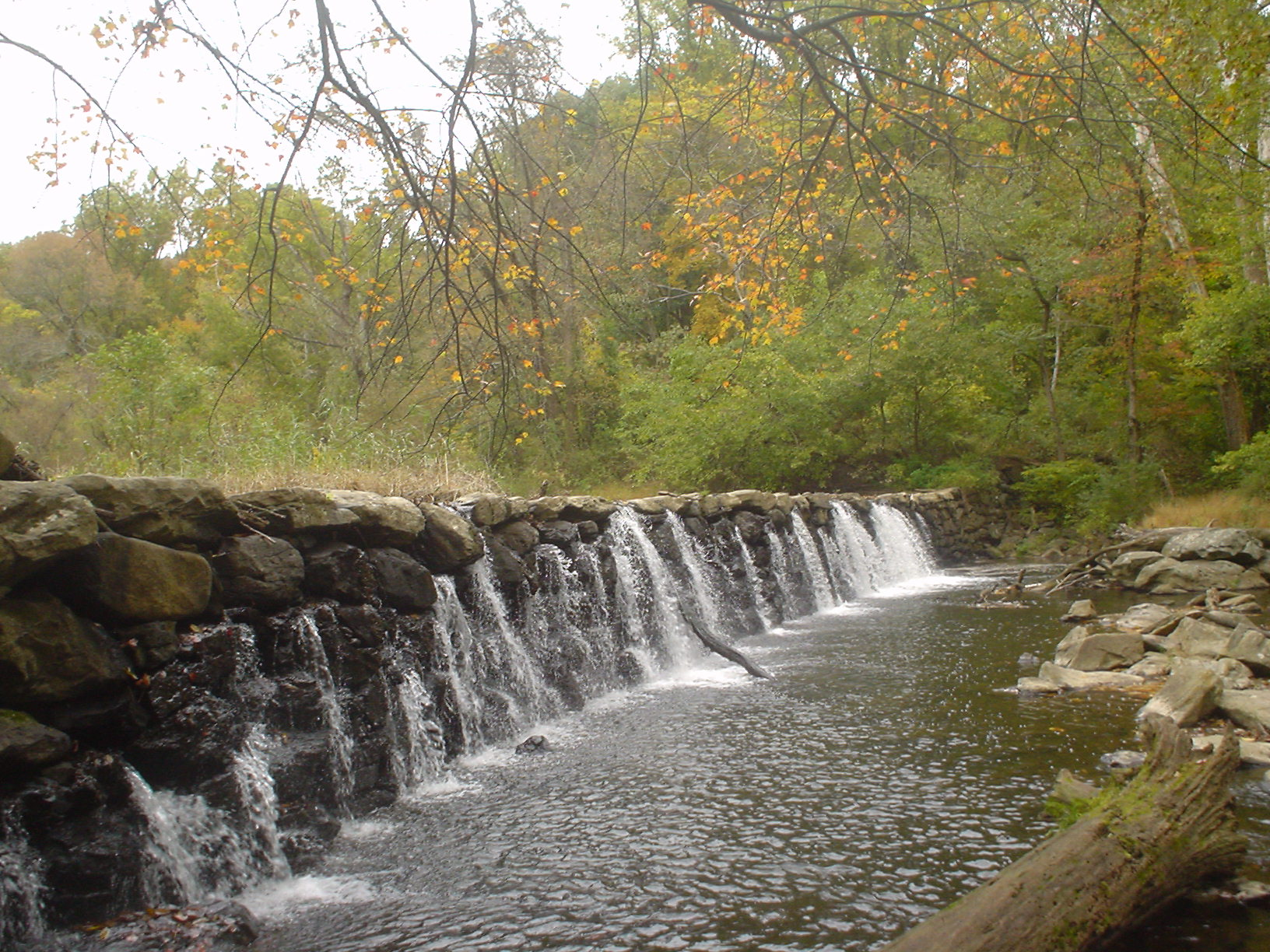
Dam on Ridley Creek at Sycamore Mills

The location of Ridley Creek State Park, just 16 miles (26 km) from downtown Philadelphia, has led to its popularity. Ridley Creek is very popular with fishermen. It is stocked with trout by the Pennsylvania Fish and Boat Commission. A portion of the creek is a designated catch and release area for fly fishing only. There is a wheelchair accessible fishing platform on a multi-use trail. The 12 miles (19 km) of hiking trails at Ridley Creek State Park are popular with dog owners. These trails pass through a variety of habitats. A 5-mile (8 km) paved, multi use trail is open to jogging, bicycling and walking. The park also features a 4.7-mile (7.6 km) equestrian trail.

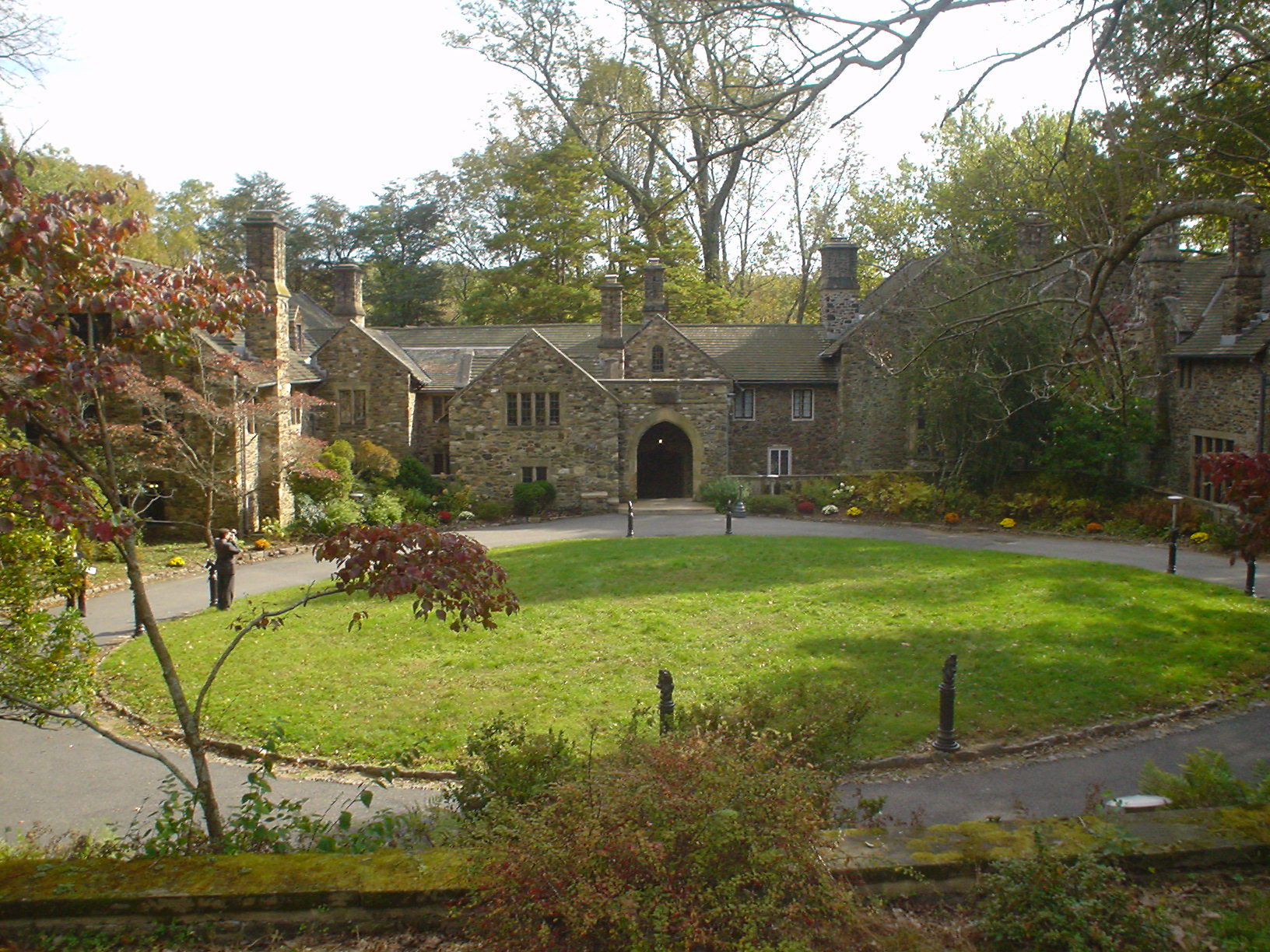
Park office, located in the Jeffords Mansion

== Sources ==
- Barr, Jeffery Robert (1993). Preservation in Ridley Creek State Park: Documentation of the Historic Farmsteads. Philadelphia: University of Pennsylvania Masters Thesis. p. 142.
