= Old Rose Tree Tavern =

- U.S. National Register of Historic Places
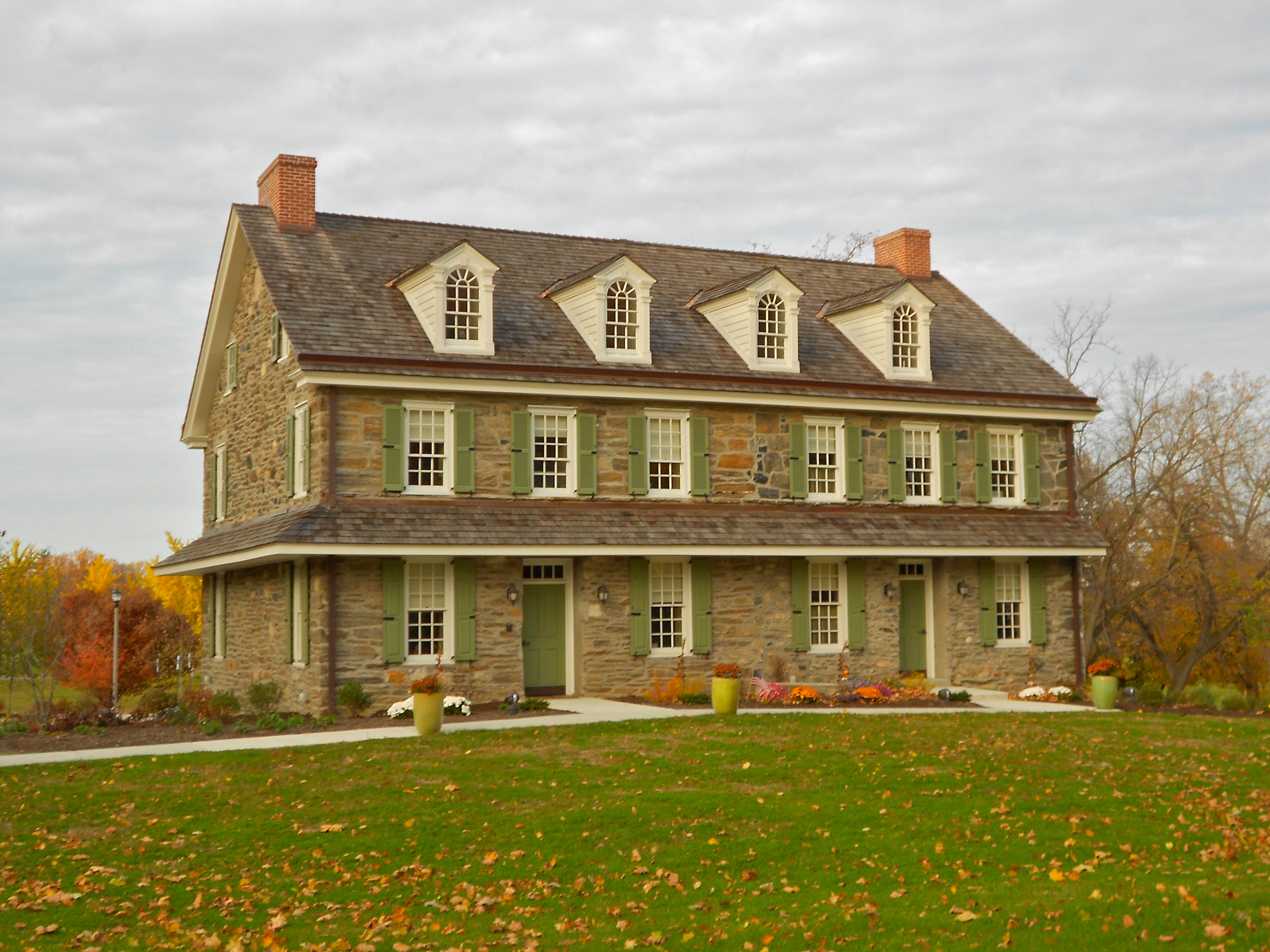
- Old Rose Tree Tavern in 2013

- Location within Pennsylvania Location within the United States
- Location: Northeast of junction of Rose Tree and Providence Roads, Media, Pennsylvania, U.S.
- Coordinates: 39°56′17″N 75°23′34″W
- Area: 0.1 acres (0.040 ha)
- Built: 1809
- Architectural style: Federal
- NRHP reference No.: 71000705
- Added to NRHP: June 21, 1971

The Old Rose Tree Tavern is an historic inn and tavern in Rose Tree Park, just north of the borough of Media, in Upper Providence Township, Delaware County, Pennsylvania, United States.

It was added to the National Register of Historic Places on June 21, 1971.

== History ==
John Calvert was granted the land that the tavern stands on in 1682 by William Penn. Daniel Calvert, who was likely John's grandson, built a frame building along the Providence Great Road (now Pennsylvania Route 252) and was licensed to run a tavern there in 1739.

The current building is a large two-and-one-half-story, fieldstone building. It was erected in 1809 on the site of the earlier frame structure. A stone addition was built in 1836.

The tavern was moved roughly one hundred yards from its original site when PA-252 was widened. During 2011 the building was renovated and now houses the Brandywine Conference & Visitors Bureau.

This tavern was added to the National Register of Historic Places on June 21, 1971.

== Gallery ==
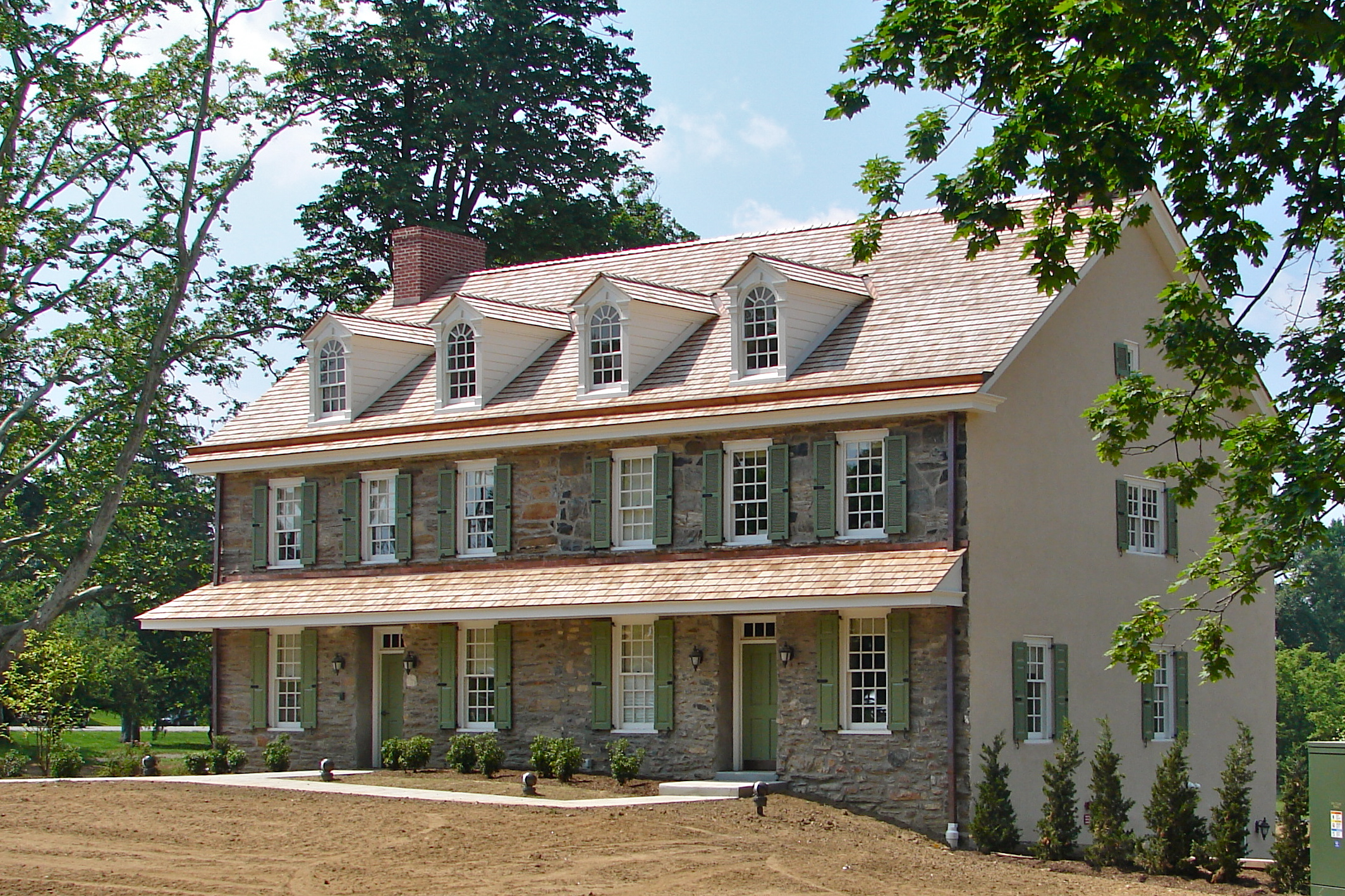
View from the southeast

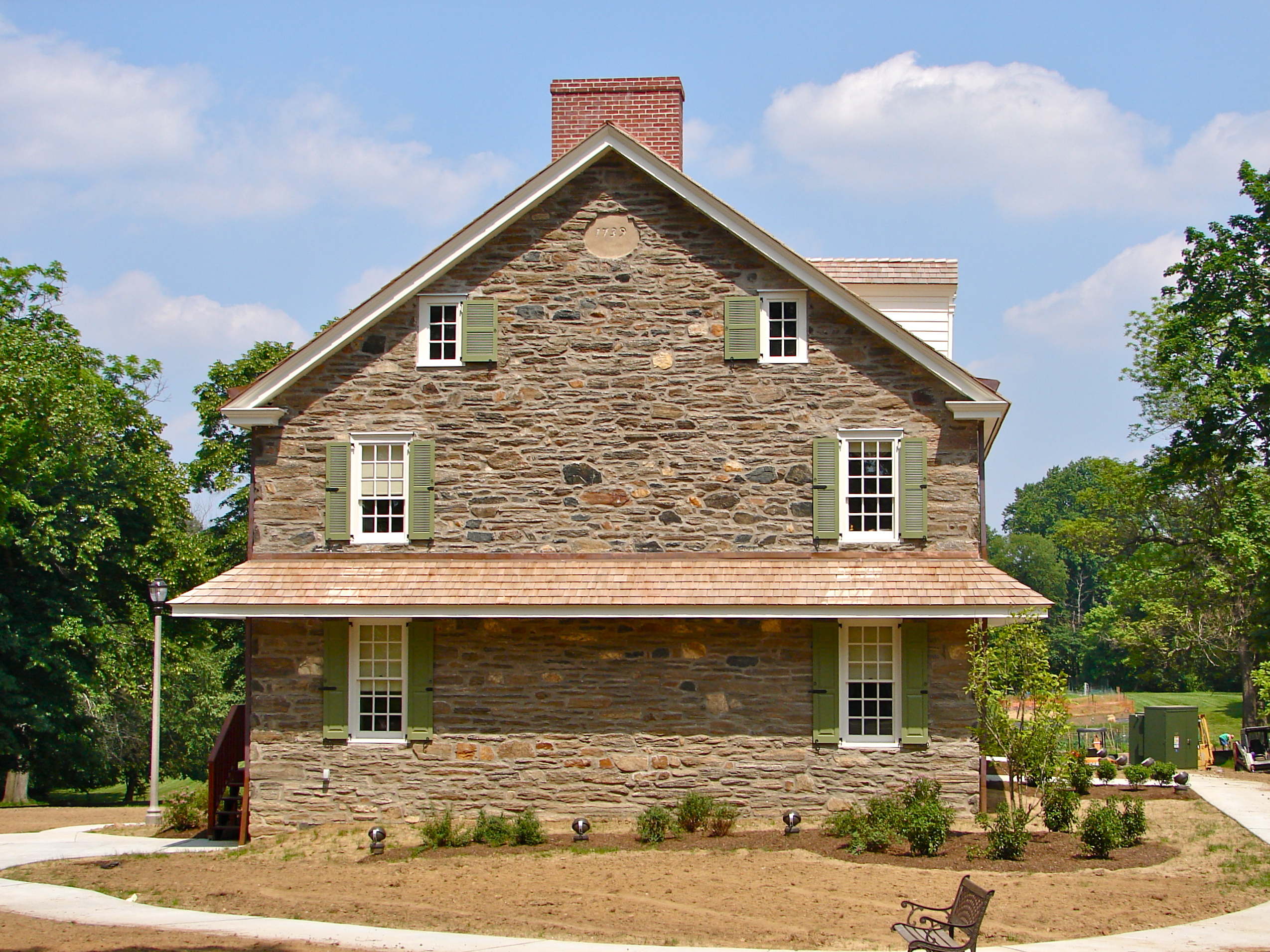
View from the west showing a 1739 datestone

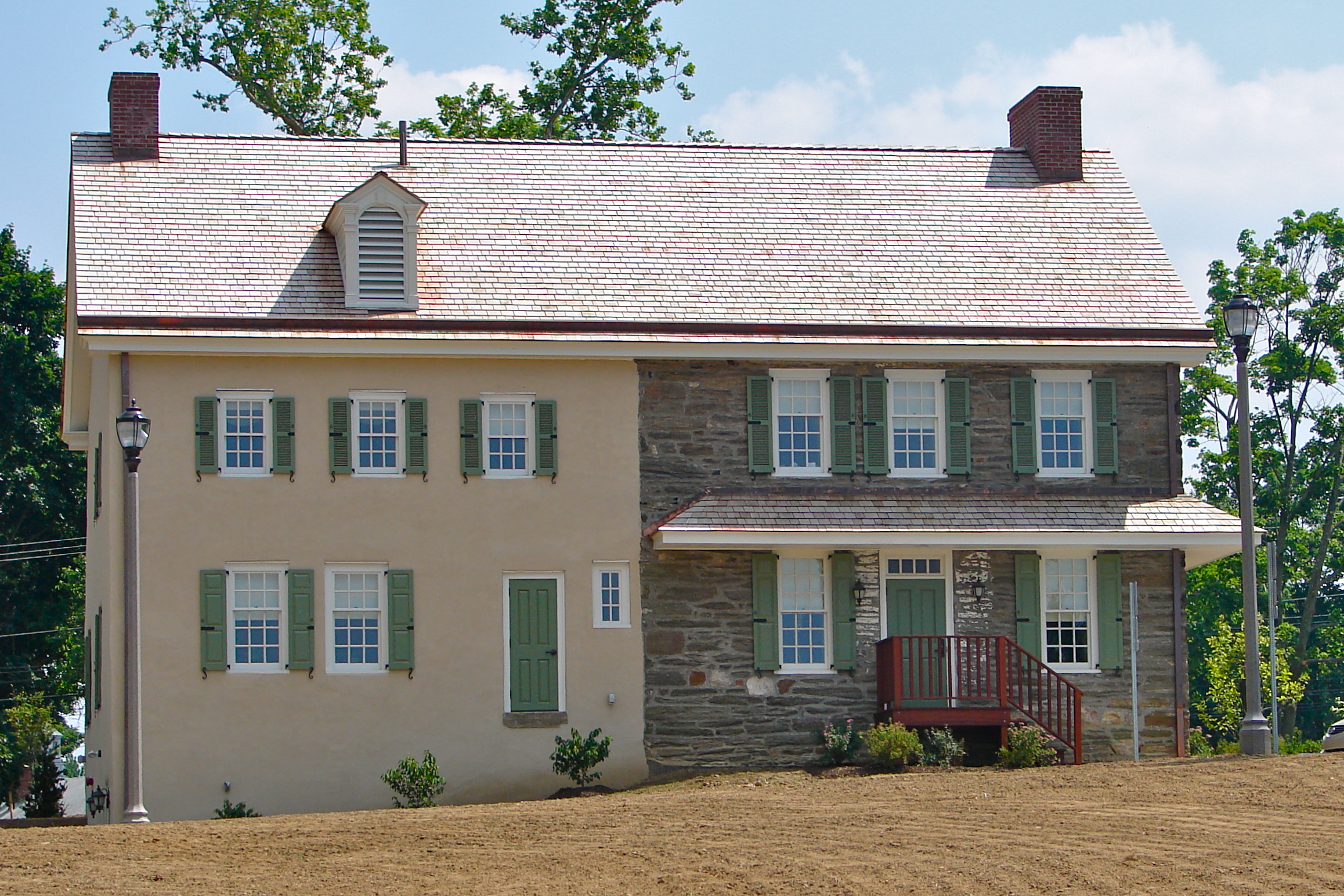
View from the north

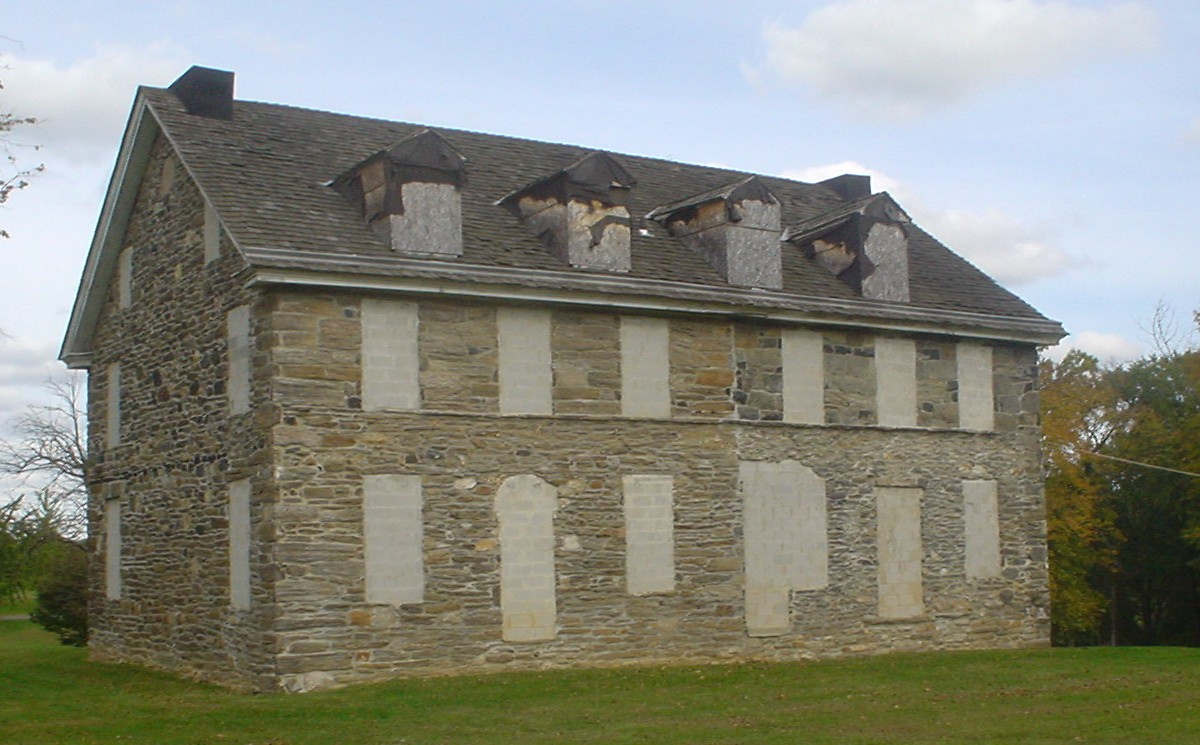
Before 2011 restoration'

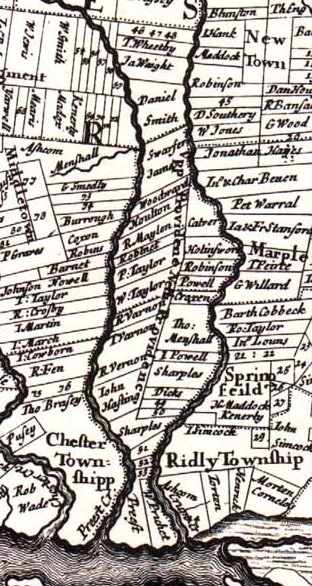
Original Calvert land grant

== See also ==
- National Register of Historic Places listings in Delaware County, Pennsylvania
