= Ridley Creek =

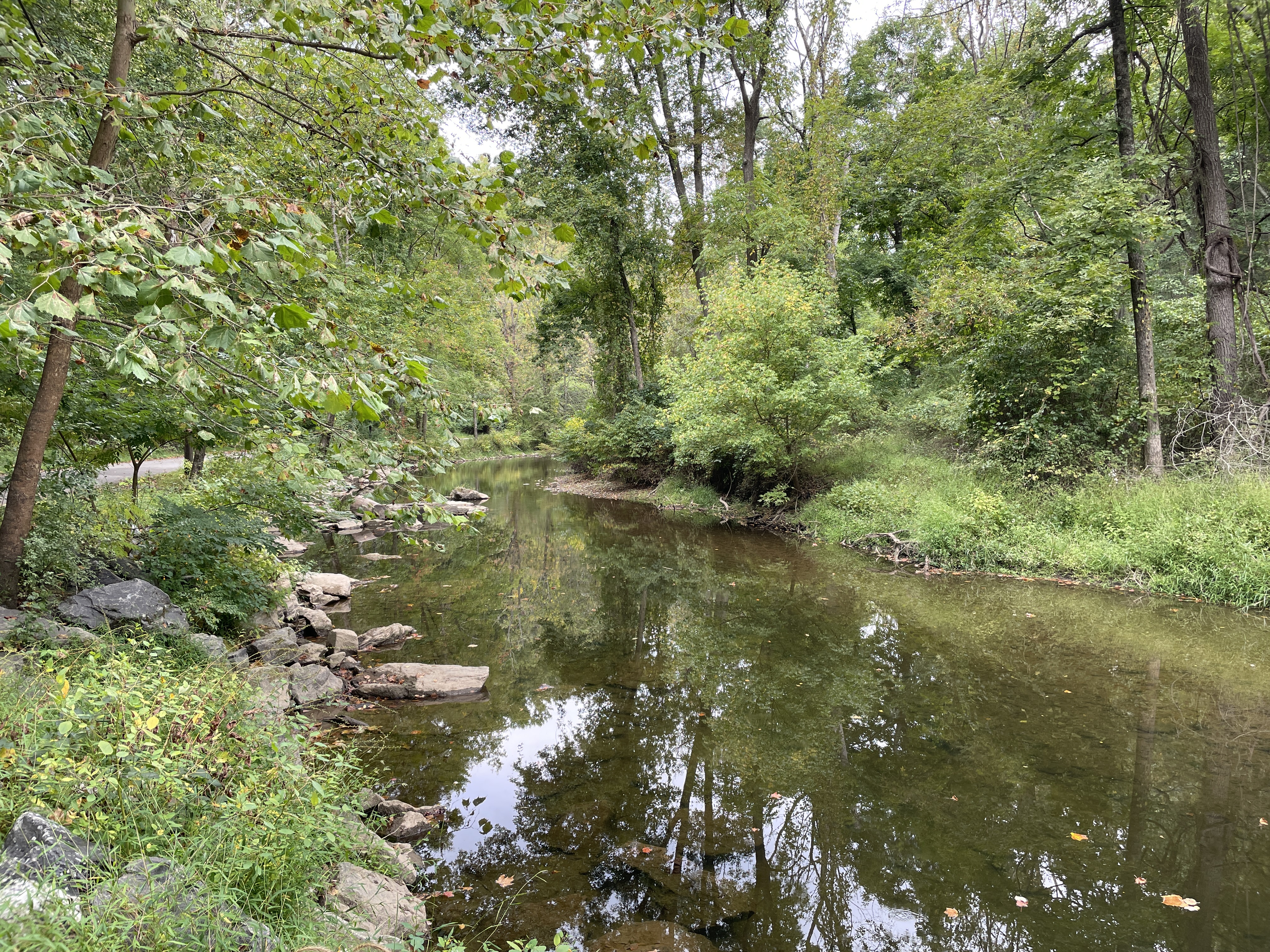
- Ridley Creek flowing through Ridley Creek State Park

- Location of the Mouth of Ridley Creek in Delaware County, Pennsylvania

Location
- Country: United States
- State: Pennsylvania
- Counties: Chester, Delaware

Physical characteristics
- Source
  - location: Frazer, Chester County
  - coordinates: 40°01′03″N 75°32′22″W
  - elevation: 2,180 ft (660 m)
- Mouth: Delaware River
  - location: Eddystone Borough, Delaware County
  - coordinates: 39°50′59″N 75°20′38″W
- Length: 23.4 mi (37.7 km)
- Basin size: 37.9 sq mi (98 km^{2})

Ridley Creek is a tributary of the Delaware River in Chester and Delaware counties, Pennsylvania in the United States.

The entire drainage basin is in the suburban Philadelphia area, but the upper creek and extensive park lands on the creek retain a rural character, while the mouth of the creek has long been heavily industrialized. Its watershed is considered to have the highest quality water in Delaware County. The creek was named for the parish of Ridley, Cheshire, England.

== Course ==
Two branches of the creek rise between Malvern and Frazer in Chester County, and then join about a mile south in East Goshen Township (West Chester) just southeast of the intersection of Paoli Pike and Route 352. The creek flows south, then southeast to enter Delaware County and Ridley Creek State Park. Leaving the park, it passes the Tyler Arboretum and the town of Media, while entering a deep gorge. It passes local parks in Rose Valley and the Taylor Memorial Arboretum in Wallingford. Before flowing into the tidal Delaware River, it forms the border between the city of Chester and the borough of Eddystone.

The length from the confluence of the two branches to the mouth is about 22 miles (35 km); including the longer Northeast branch gives a length of about 23 miles (37 km).

== Watershed ==
The upper creek has Piedmont Upland geological features and the mouth has Coastal Plain features. Rocks include granite gneiss, mica schist, and sand and gravel.

Seventeen municipalities, with a population of about 62,000, are included in the 38-square-mile (98 km^{2}) watershed. The 40,000 residents of Upper Providence, Nether Providence, and Middletown townships, and Media use 2.7 million gallons per day of drinking water supplied from Aqua Pennsylvania's Media plant.

== History ==
Olof Persson Stille, a Swedish millwright who arrived in the area in 1641, settled on the north bank of the creek in present-day Eddystone, and the creek was called Olle Stille's Creek. Thomas Holme's map of 1687 labeled the creek "Preest Cr." next to a land grant at the mouth of the creek labeled "Preest" and shows land grants from William Penn extending the length of the creek, into the Welsh Tract at the source.

Water mills were established along the creek early in its history, including the Providence Mills gristmill in 1718, and the Old Mill in Rose Valley in 1789. Providence Mills, located in present-day Ridley Creek State Park and now known as Sycamore Mills, expanded to include a nail factory and a saw mill which operated until 1901. The Old Mill started as a snuff mill, then became a paper mill, and finally a woolen textile mill, which operated until about 1880.

In 1826 there were 15 mills operating on the creek, including gristmills, sawmills, cotton mills rolling and slitting mills, snuffmills, a tilt mill, and a woolen mill.

The Leiper Railroad, which has a claim to be America's first railroad, operated from 1810-1828 between Thomas Leiper's quarry on Crum Creek to tidewater on Ridley Creek, a distance of about three-fourths mile.

From 1906-1956 the Baldwin Locomotive Works operated north of the mouth of the creek along the Delaware in Eddystone. Today an Exelon generating plant operates in the area. In 2006 Harrah's Chester established a harness racing track and casino near the south bank of the creek at its confluence with the Delaware River.

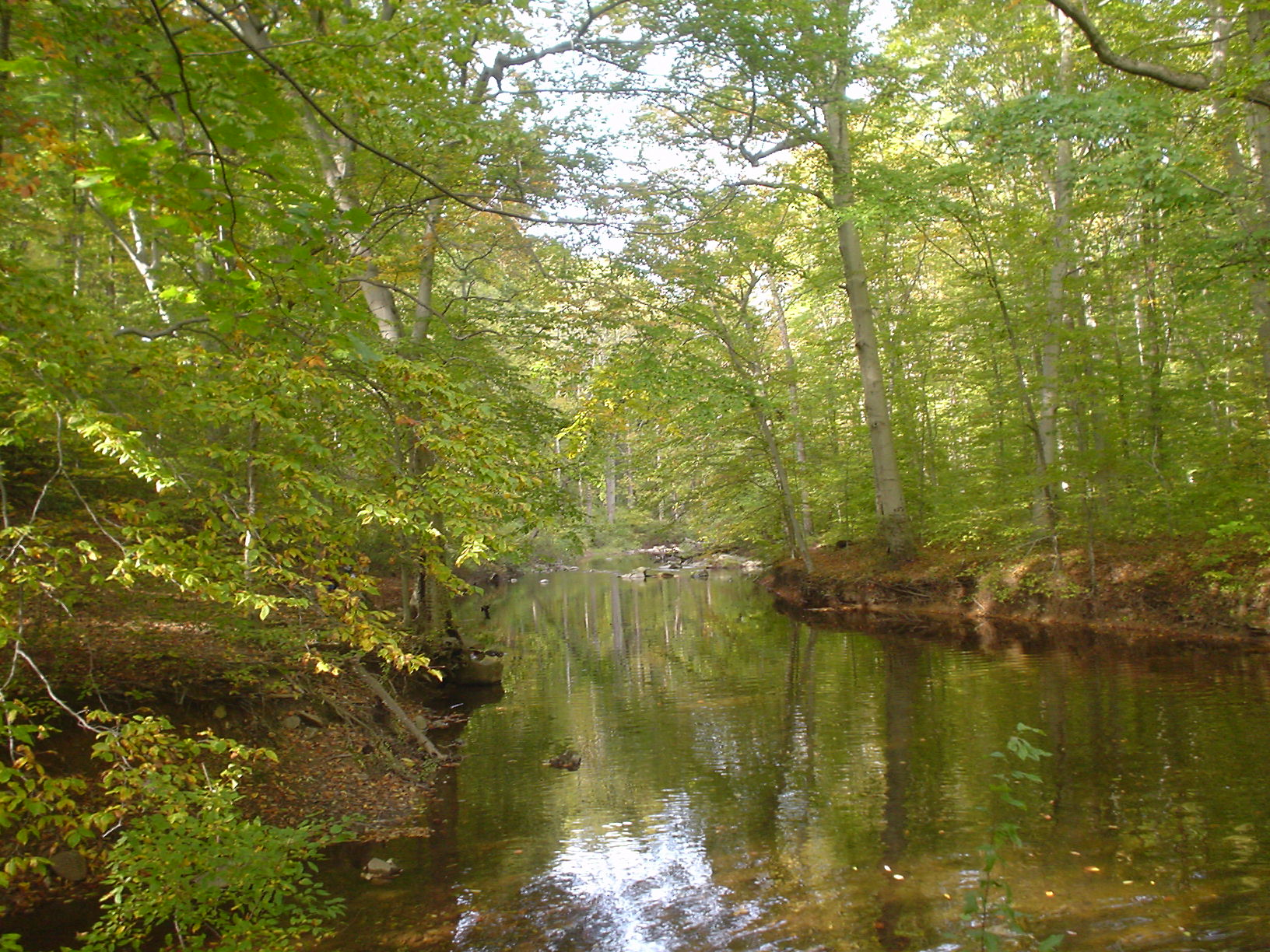
In Ridley Creek State Park 39.9491°N 75.4301°W

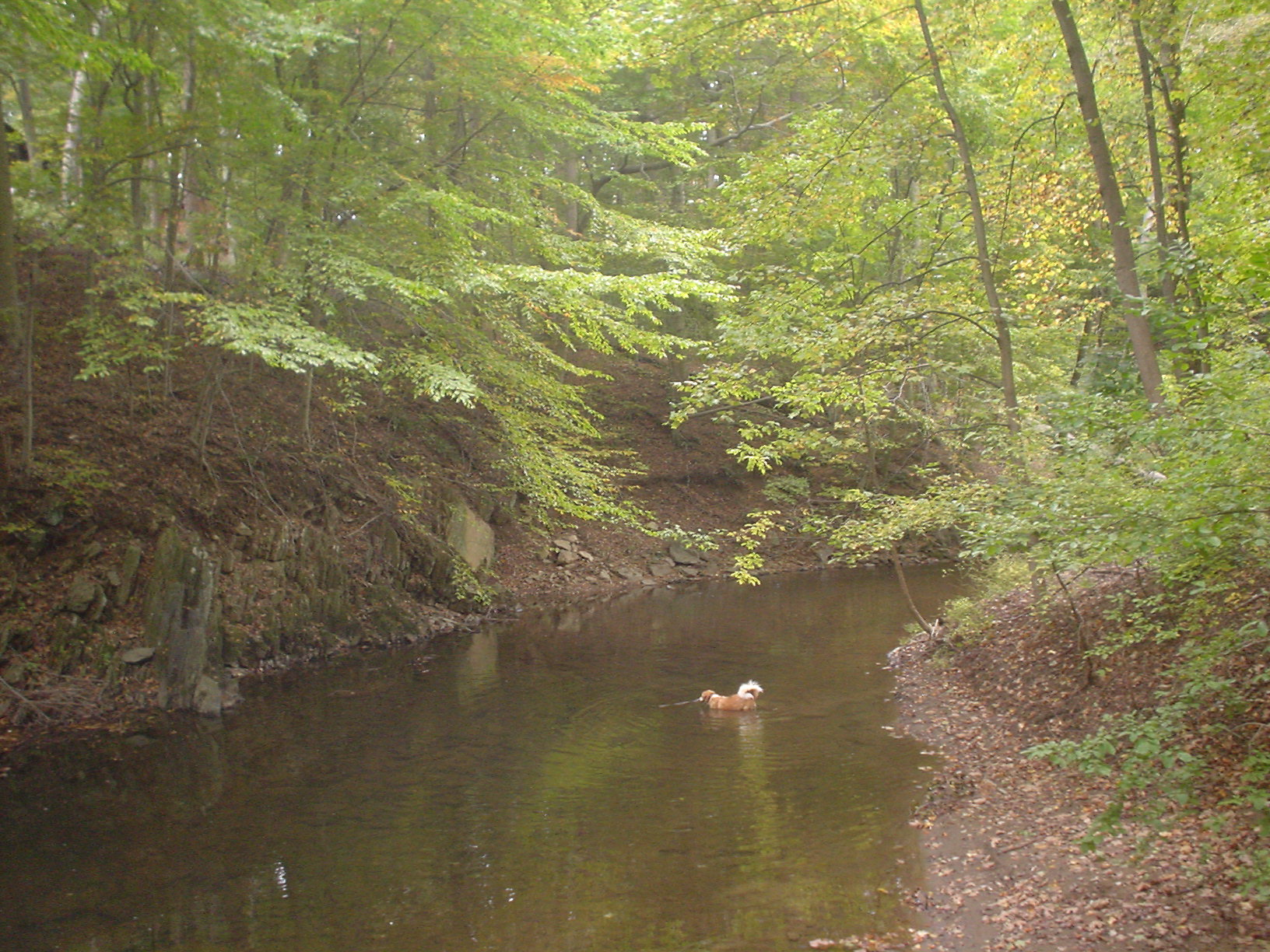
Long Point in Rose Valley 39.8938°N 75.3858°W

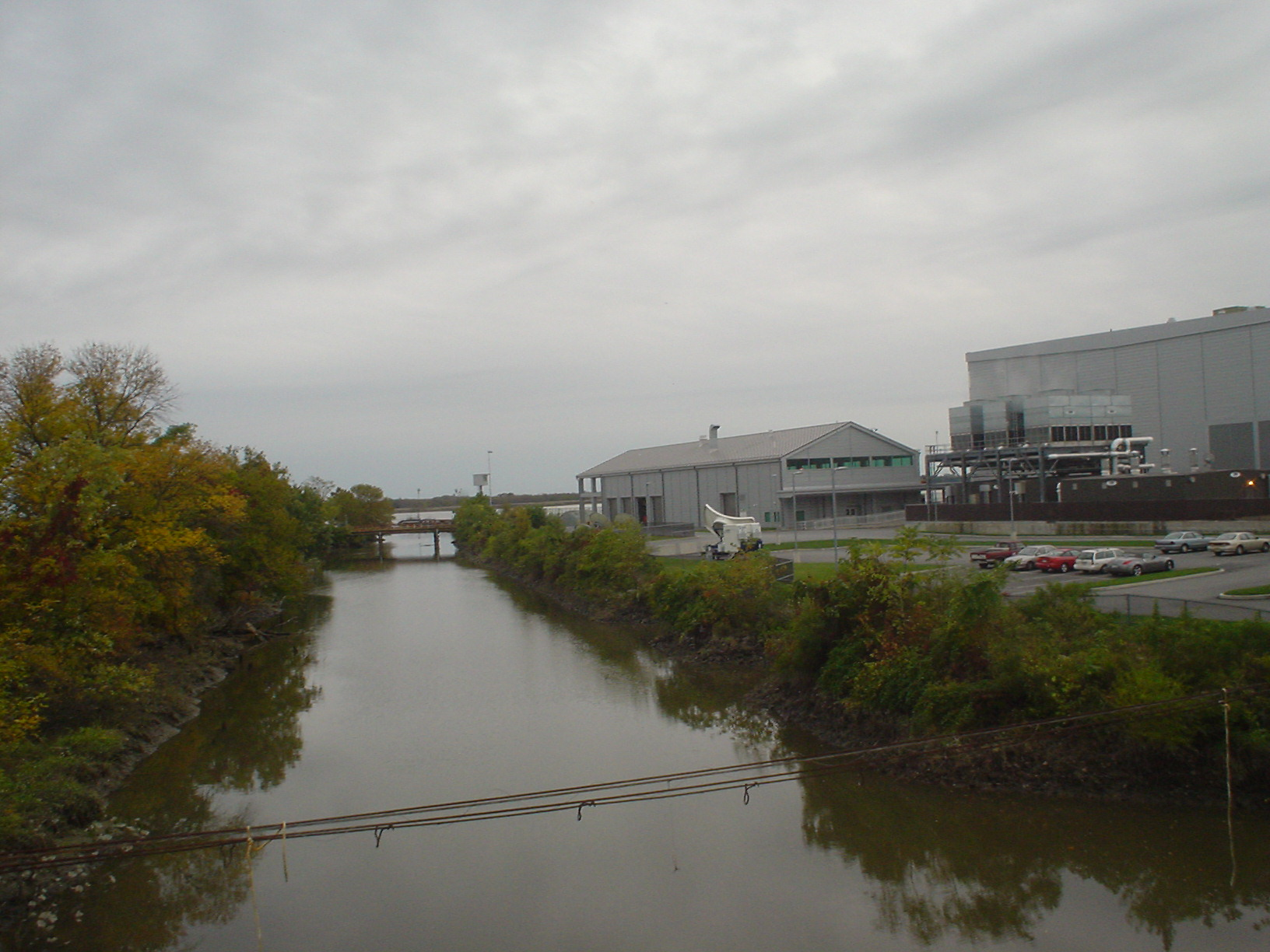
Mouth of Ridley Creek on the Delaware River

== Tributaries ==
- Vernon Run
- Spring Run
- Dismal Run
- Hunters Run

== See also ==
- Port of Chester
- List of rivers of Pennsylvania
