= Taylor Memorial Arboretum =

Arboretum and garden in Wallingford, Pennsylvania, United States

Coordinates: 39.872°N 75.370°W

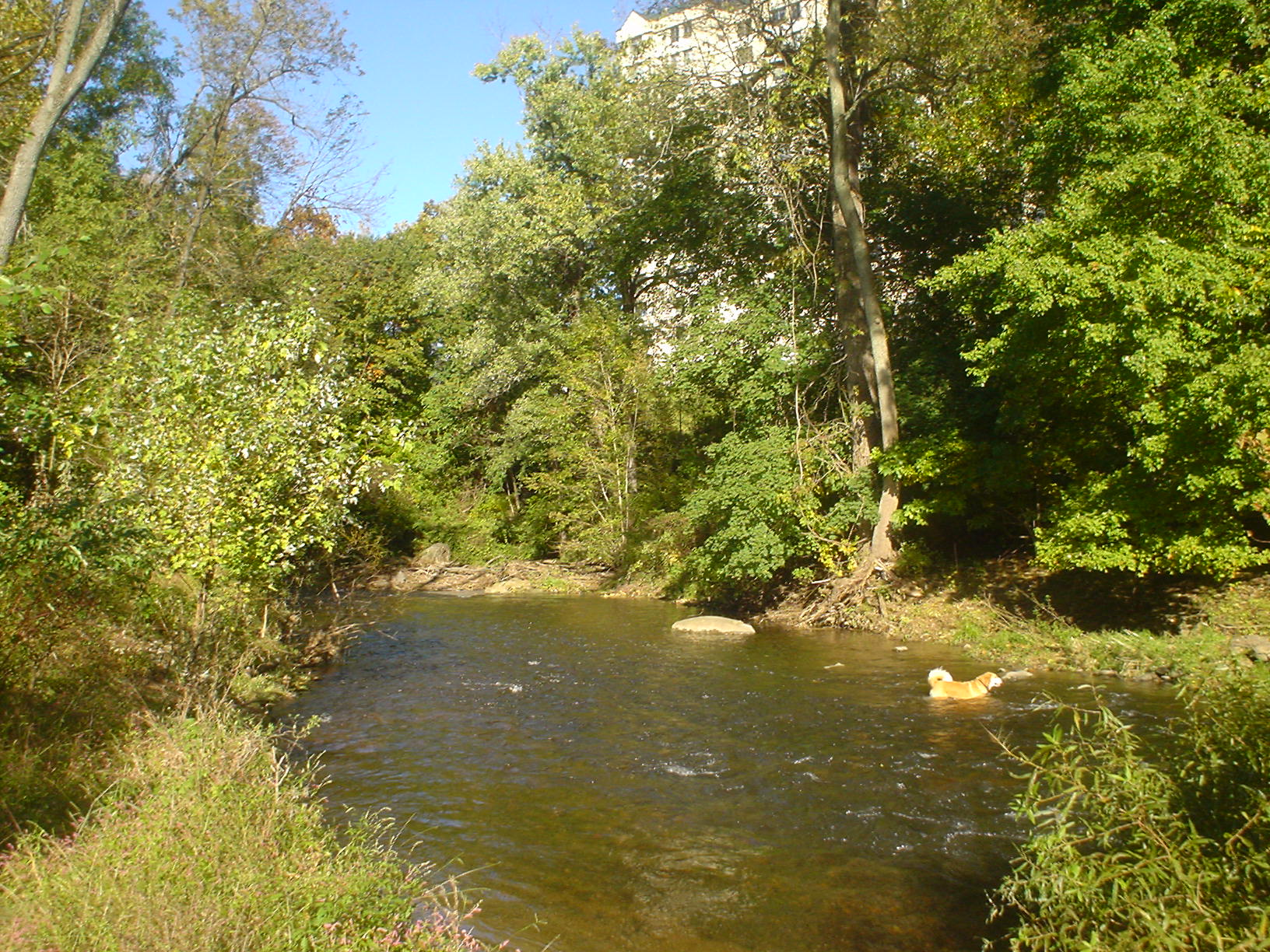
- Ridley Creek forms the border between the arboretum and the urban area near Chester.
- Interactive map of Taylor Memorial Arboretum
- Type: Arboretum, Garden
- Location: 10 Ridley Drive, Wallingford, Pennsylvania, United States
- Area: 30 acres (12 ha)
- Administrator: Widener University
- Website: Official website

The Taylor Memorial Arboretum is a thirty-acre arboretum and garden that is located at 10 Ridley Drive, Wallingford, Pennsylvania, United States, along Ridley Creek.

Open daily, the arboretum has been administrated by Widener University since May 2016.

== History and notable features ==
The Taylor Memorial Arboretum was established in 1931 by Joshua C. Taylor, a lawyer and conservation proponent in Chester, Pennsylvania. Created on the site of a previous industrial mill complex, it is located seven miles south of the similarly named John J. Tyler Arboretum.

This arboretum features a grotto (former quarry), millrace, and pond with bald cypress. Its collection also includes three Pennsylvania State Champion Trees (a giant dogwood, a needle juniper, and a lacebark elm), as well as azaleas, dogwoods, magnolias, junipers, lilacs, viburnums, witch-hazels, Japanese maples, boxwoods, and arborvitae. The site also contains cattails, ferns, irises, mosses, rushes, and wildflowers.

In 2005, the dam was removed to make the environment "flow more smoothly" and because people were swimming in the creek. The remains of the dam, including large rocks and the steel that held it together, may be found at the bank of the creek.

== See also ==
- List of botanical gardens in the United States
