= Upper Providence Township, Delaware County, Pennsylvania =

Township in Pennsylvania, US

Upper Providence Township
- Home rule municipality
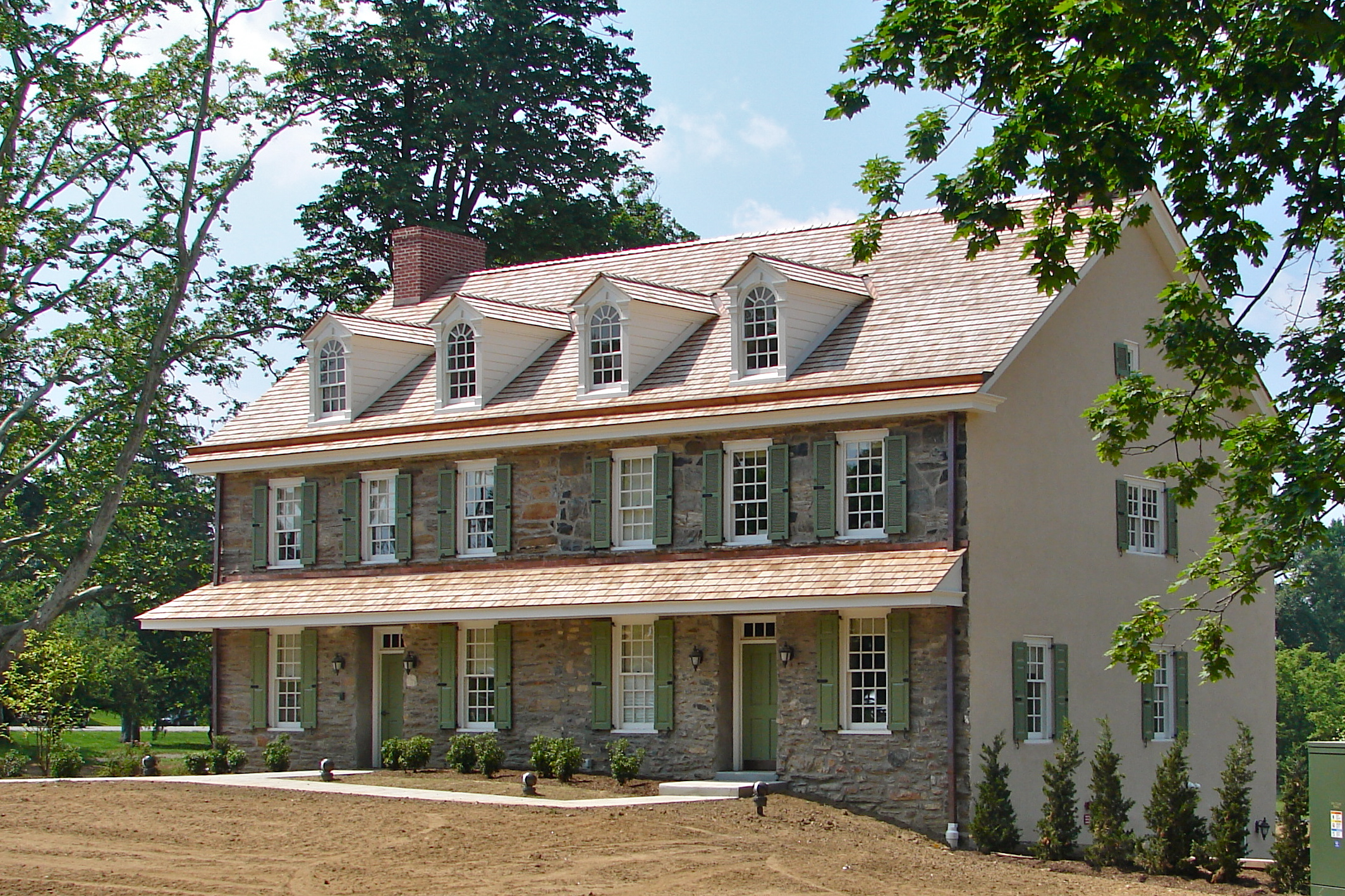
- Old Rose Tree Tavern

- Seal

- Location in Delaware County and the state of Pennsylvania.

- Location of Pennsylvania in the United States
- Coordinates: 39°56′31″N 75°23′47″W
- Country: United States
- State: Pennsylvania
- County: Delaware

Area
  - Total: 5.81 sq mi (15.05 km^{2})
  - Land: 5.60 sq mi (14.51 km^{2})
  - Water: 0.21 sq mi (0.54 km^{2})
- Elevation: 330 ft (100 m)

Population (2010)
  - Total: 10,142
  - Estimate (2016): 10,446
  - Density: 1,864.2/sq mi (719.78/km^{2})
- FIPS code: 42-045-79248
- Website: www.upperprovidence.org

Upper Providence Township is a township in Delaware County, Pennsylvania, United States, located around and to the north of the borough of Media, and approximately 15 miles (24 km) west of center city Philadelphia. The population was 10,142 at the 2010 census. The township lies between Ridley Creek on the west and Crum Creek on the east. Most of Ridley Creek State Park is in the township, towards the northern edge. Zoning is 98% residential, 1% commercial and 1% industrial, with minimal space zoned to commercial business.

== History ==
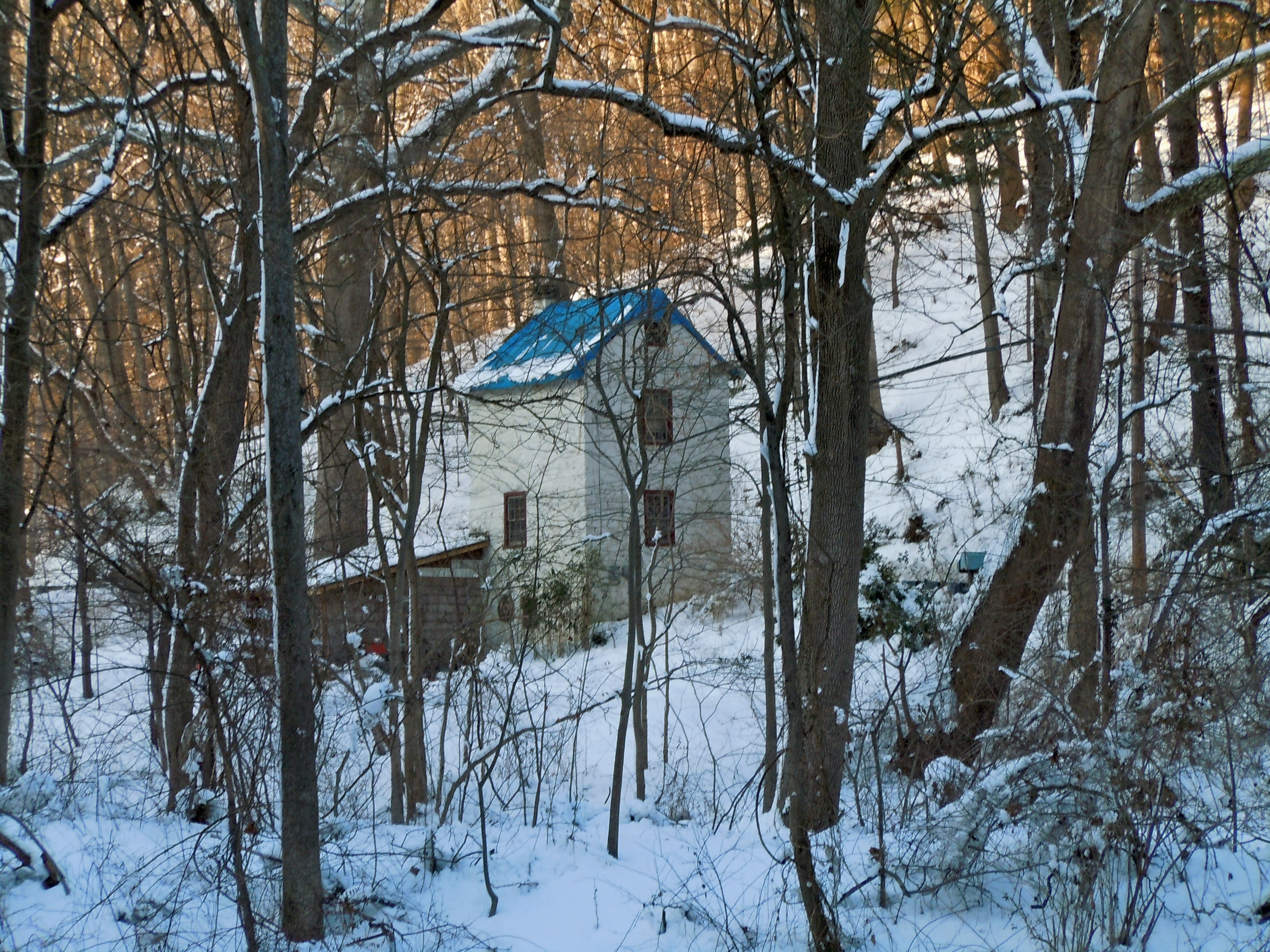
Historic Union Library building on Bishop Hollow Road near Ridley Creek Park

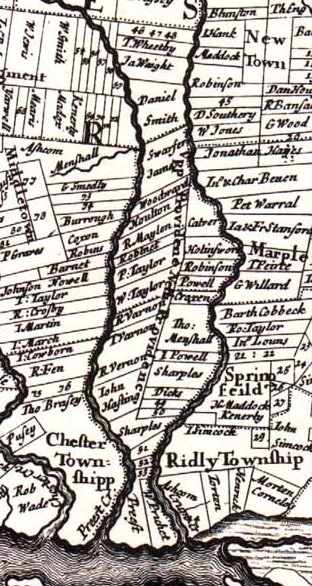
1687 Holmes Map

The area was settled about 1683 and formed into Providence Township. On October 17, 1683, the residents of Providence Township petitioned the Court of Chester County, of which they were then a part, to establish a road from Providence to Chester. The court approved the creation of Providence Great Road (now Route 252). Upper Providence Township and Nether Providence Township, Pennsylvania split in 1687. The borough of Media was formed in 1850 from pieces of both townships.

Water power was used extensively in the township's early history, with local mills including Sycamore Mills or Bishop's Mills built on Ridley Creek in 1718, Robinett Grist Mill (1687), Malin's Grist Mill (1770), Register's Nail Factory (1812), and Palmer's Mills (1802).

The first school in the township was the Blue Hill School near Chapel and Providence roads, started with money left by Quaker James Turner in his 1787 will. The Union Library on Sycamore Mill Road opened in 1813 and had over 800 volumes by 1843. Sandy Bank School opened in 1836, was rebuilt 1905, and enlarged in 1926. Lower Banks School opened in 1872. The Rose Tree Union School District was established in 1947.

The Rose Tree Tavern, built in 1739, was a well-known inn in the late 19th century as a summer resort for Philadelphians. Steeplechase races and fox hunts were held there by the Rose Tree Hunt Club. It still stands after having been moved and renovated ahead of the PA 252 road widening project of 2013, reopening its doors in 2011 as a tourism office in Rose Tree Park.

Media Cemetery was established in 1857 and merged with West Media Cemetery in 1928 to create the current 21-acre sized cemetery.

== Geography ==
According to the United States Census Bureau, the township has a total area of 5.8 square miles (15.0 km^{2}), of which 5.6 square miles (14.5 km^{2}) is land and 0.19 square miles (0.5 km^{2}), or 3.57%, is water. The noted Rose Tree Park is located in Upper Providence Township, but is owned and managed by Delaware County; the township does have other various parks, including Cherry Street Park, Houtman Park, Ray Roche Park, Louis Scott Park, and Berman Park.

== Demographics ==
Historical population
Census	Pop.	Note	%±
1930	2,008		—
1940	1,932		−3.8%
1950	3,598		86.2%
1960	6,059		68.4%
1970	9,234		52.4%
1980	9,477		2.6%
1990	9,727		2.6%
2000	10,509		8.0%
2010	10,142		−3.5%
2020	10,852		7.0%
U.S. Decennial Census

As of Census 2010, the racial makeup of the township was 89.8% White, 3.9% African American, 0.0% Native American, 4.3% Asian, 0.4% from other races, and 1.5% from two or more races. Hispanic or Latino of any race were 1.5% of the population.

As of the census of 2000, there were 10,509 people, 4,075 households, and 2,828 families residing in the township. The population density was 1,879.6 inhabitants per square mile (725.7/km^{2}). There were 4,299 housing units at an average density of 768.9 units per square mile (296.9 units/km^{2}). The racial makeup of the township was 91.83% White, 3.90% Black or African American, 0.08% Native American, 3.05% Asian, 0.29% from other races, and 0.85% from two or more races. Hispanic or Latino of any race were 1.07% of the population.

There were 4,075 households, out of which 32.4% had children under the age of 18 living with them, 59.8% were married couples living together, 7.3% had a female householder with no husband present, and 30.6% were non-families. 25.6% of all households were made up of individuals, and 6.2% had someone living alone who was 65 years of age or older. The average household size was 2.56 and the average family size was 3.13.

In the township the population was spread out, with 24.7% under the age of 18, 5.9% from 18 to 24, 28.9% from 25 to 44, 27.9% from 45 to 64, and 12.6% who were 65 years of age or older. The median age was 40 years. For every 100 females, there were 96.5 males. For every 100 females aged 18 and over, there were 94.4 males.

The median income for a household in the township was $107,166, and the median income for a family was $130,450. Males had a median income of $99,848 versus $75,491 for females. The per capita income for the township was $55,532. About 1.3% of families and 3.9% of the population were below the poverty line, including 2.7% of those under age 18 and 3.4% of those age 65 or over.

== Education ==
Upper Providence Township lies within the Rose Tree Media School District, created in 1966 by a merger with the Rose Tree Union and Media Borough School Districts.

Public school students residing within the township attend either Rose Tree Elementary School, in the township boundaries, or Media Elementary School for grades K-5, depending on where they live. Springton Lake Middle School (located within township boundaries) serves students in grades 6–8, and Penncrest High School serves students in grades 9–12.

The Walden School and Benchmark School are the only two private schools in the township.

St. Mary Magdalen School is the township's only parochial school.

Cardinal O'Hara High School is the local parochial high school located about two miles east of Upper Providence Township.

Pennsylvania Institute of Technology is in the township.

The township is served by the Media-Upper Providence Free Library.

== Transportation ==
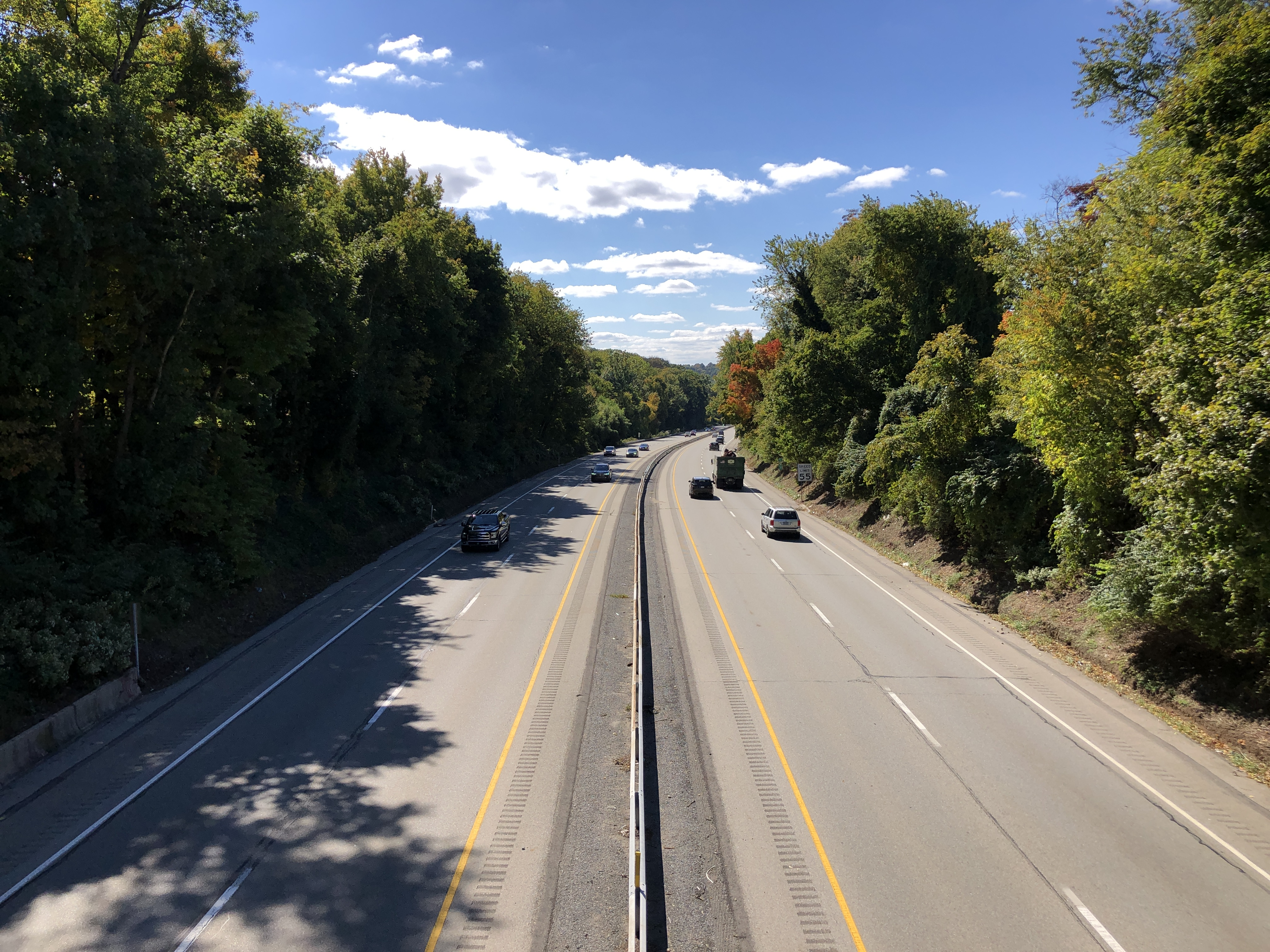
US 1 southbound in Upper Providence Township

As of 2019, there were 55.59 miles (89.46 km) of public roads in Upper Providence Township, of which 17.56 miles (28.26 km) were maintained by Pennsylvania Department of Transportation (PennDOT) and 38.03 miles (61.20 km) were maintained by the township.

The township's road system is made up of many local roads and a few major roads that are maintained by PennDOT, such as US 1, PA 252 (both Providence Road and Palmer's Mill Road), Rose Tree Road, Baltimore Pike, Bishop Hollow Road, Ridley Creek Road, Kirk Lane, and others, with most traffic volume occurring at the interchange between PA 252 and US 1 (Media Bypass), where Kirk Lane and Rose Tree Road are also both within a tenth of a mile of the interchange and contribute to the traffic volume of the interchange area.

The township is served by SEPTA public transportation. The Media station along SEPTA Regional Rail's Media/Wawa Line is in the township. SEPTA provides Suburban Bus service to Upper Providence Township along Route 110, which runs between Penn State Brandywine and the 69th Street Transportation Center, and Route 118, which runs between the Chester Transit Center and Newtown Square.

== Notable people ==
- John Cassin (1813–1869), ornithologist born in Upper Providence Township
- Frank Furness (1839–1912), architect
