= Rose Tree Park =

Coordinates: 39.942320°N 75.390666°W

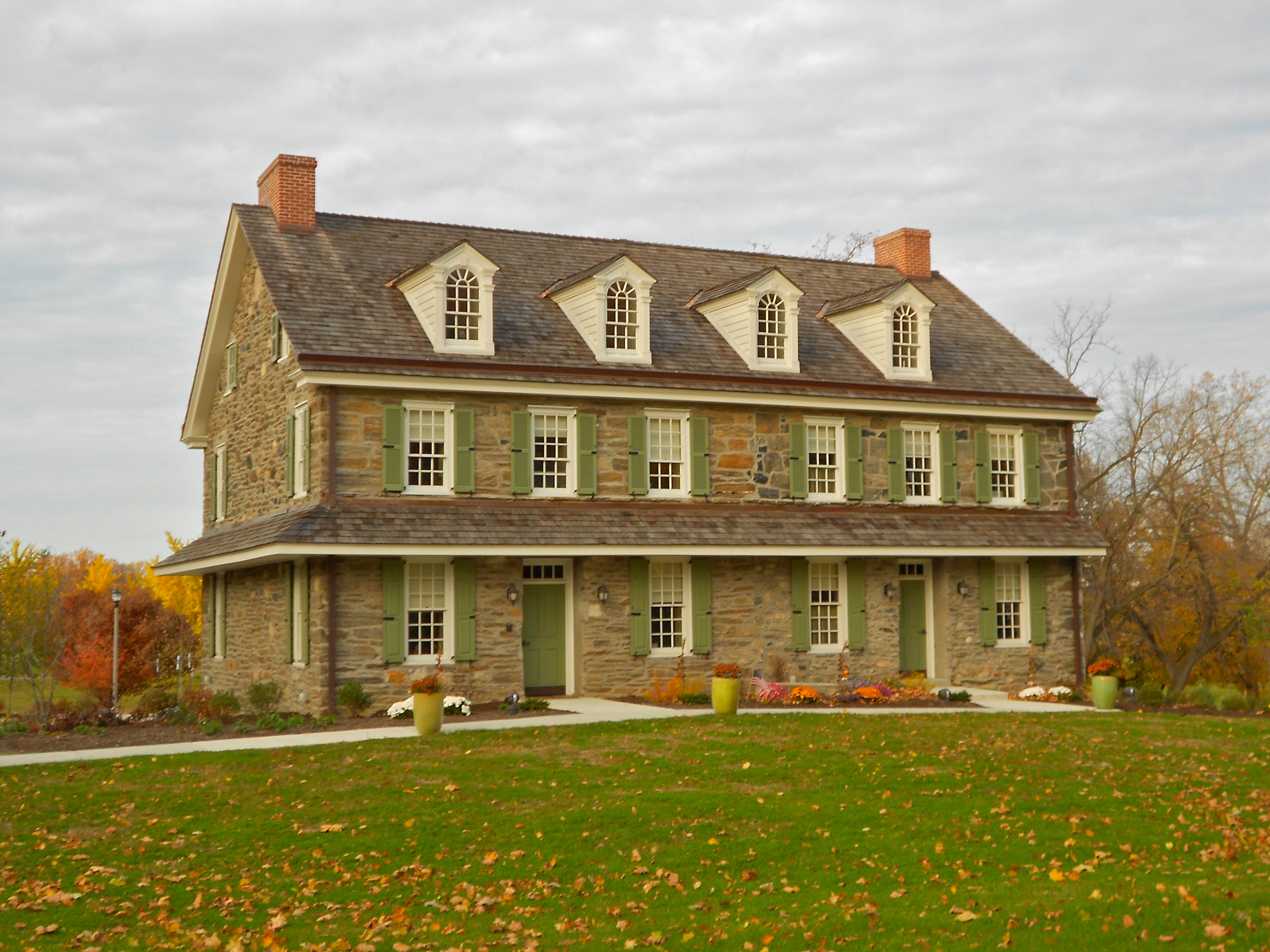
Historic Rose Tree Tavern

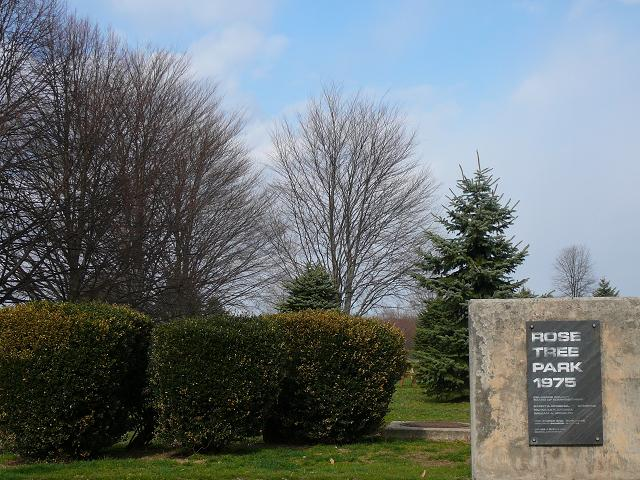

Rose Tree Park is located on Providence Road in Upper Providence Township, Pennsylvania in the suburbs of Philadelphia and used to be used for steeplechase racing. The park is 122 acres (0.49 km^{2}) in size and is open to the public. There are benches, picnic tables, a gazebo, a nature trail, an outdoor amphitheater, and three historical buildings in the park. The Old Rose Tree Tavern is on the National Register of Historic Places. Besides offering daily recreational use, Rose Tree Park hosts a variety of special events.

== Events ==
Every year in the summer, Rose Tree Park hosts the Delaware County Summer Festival, an outdoor concerts series which runs for nine weeks, from mid-June through mid-August. The concerts take place in the park's hillside amphitheater and offer a diverse schedule of bands, concert musicians, dancers, and children's shows.

Every winter, from December to early January, the park sparkles with lighted trees and holiday displays. The Festival of Lights opens with a tree lighting ceremony featuring carolers, guest speakers, and the arrival of Santa. Admission is free.
