= John J. Tyler Arboretum =

Historic arboretum in Middletown Township, Pennsylvania, United States

- Tyler Arboretum
- U.S. National Register of Historic Places
- U.S. Historic district
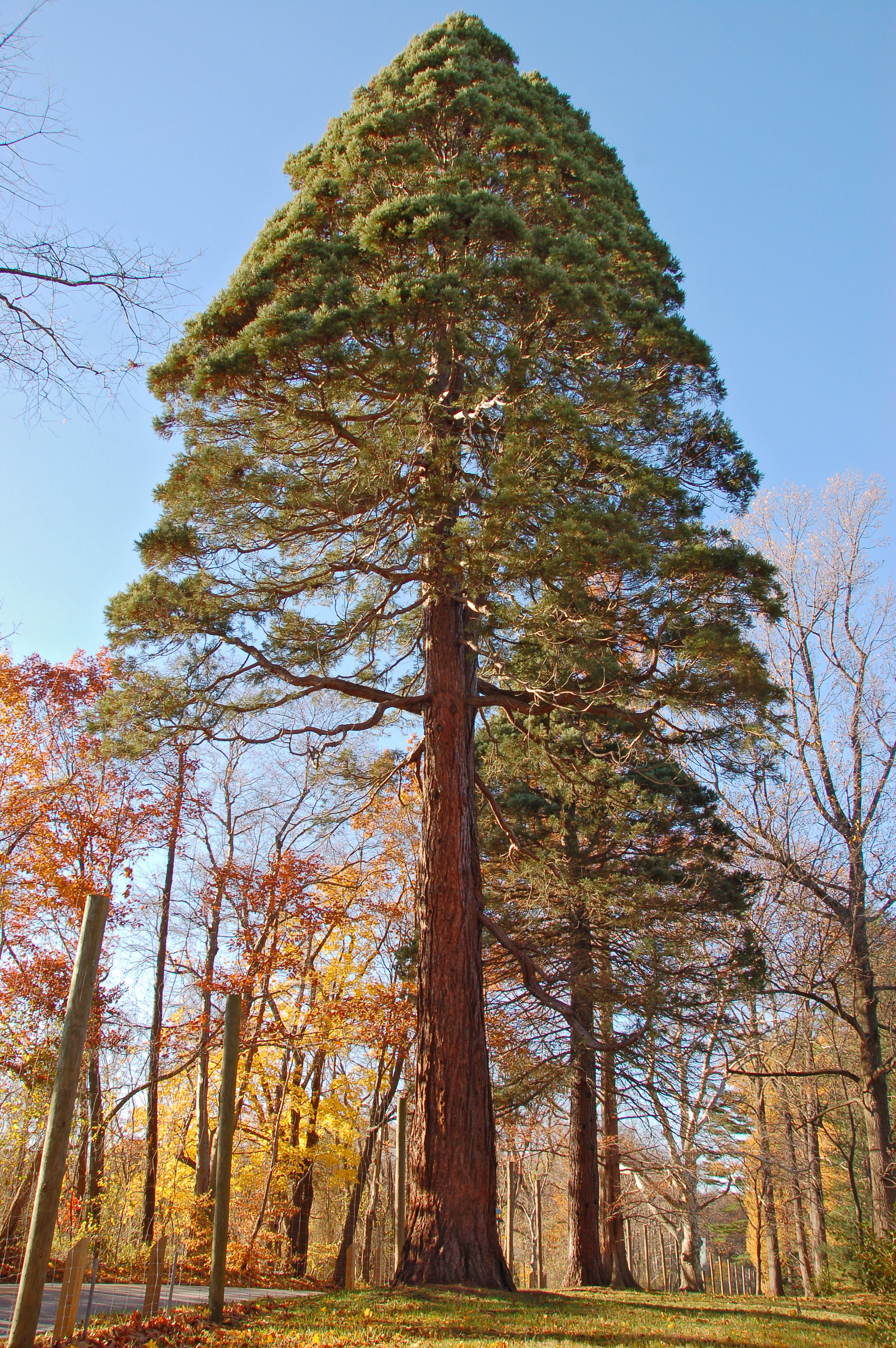
- Giant Sequoia (Sequoiadendron giganteum)

- Location within Pennsylvania Location within the United States
- Location: 515 Painter Rd., Media, PA 19063
- Coordinates: 39°56′05″N 75°25′52″W
- Area: 657 acres (266 ha)
- Built: 1710
- Built by: Thomas Minshall (1738 house), Jacob Minshall (1777 addition)
- Architect: Robert Rodes McGoodwin (1932 stone house)
- Architectural style: Georgian Revival
- Visitation: 70,000 visitors a year
- Website: tylerarboretum.org
- NRHP reference No.: 03000080
- Added to NRHP: February 27, 2003

Tyler Arboretum is a nonprofit arboretum located at 515 Painter Road, Middletown Township, Delaware County, Pennsylvania. The arboretum is open daily except for major holidays and an admission fee is charged to non-members.

== History ==
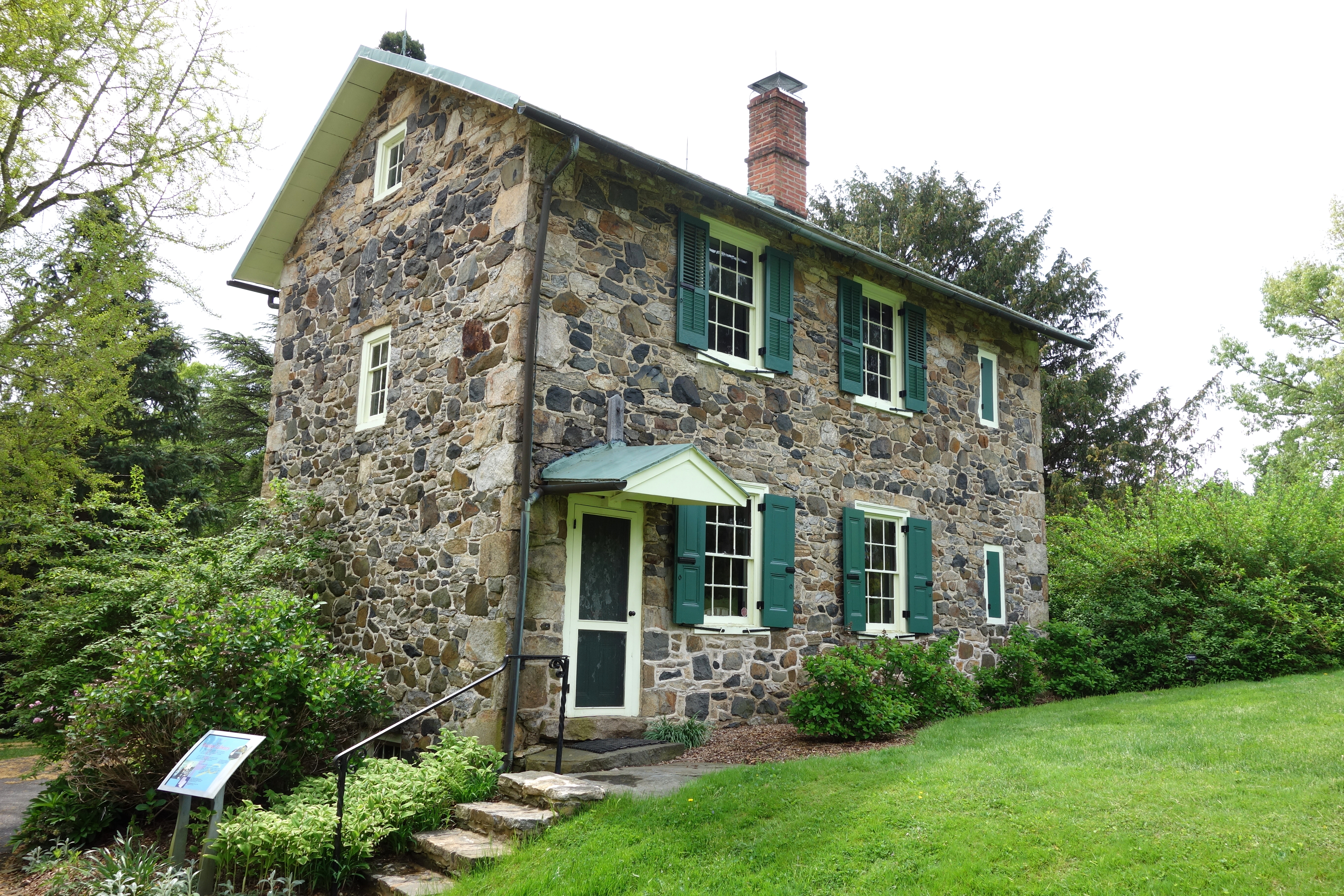
Painter Library has historically housed books and archival materials. The library is just one of the many historical buildings still onsite.

The property's history began in 1681, when William Penn signed a "lease and release" agreement with Thomas Minshall, an English Quaker, for property in Pennsylvania that contained the site now occupied by the arboretum. Between 1681 and 1944, the property was home to eight generations of the same family. The arboretum itself started in 1825 when two brothers, Jacob and Minshall Painter, set aside land to systematically plant more than 1,000 varieties of trees and shrubs.

In 1944, descendant Laura Tyler bequeathed the property, in memorial to her husband John J. Tyler, to be a nonprofit arboretum.The location was added to the National Register of Historic Places in 2001. Today, Tyler Arboretum attracts 70,000 visitors a year to its 650-acre campus and boasts 17 miles of pathways and hiking trails.

== Collections ==
The horticultural collections include the following major features:

- The original Painter Trees: 1. Lebanon Cedar (Cedrus libani), a Pennsylvania state champion; 2. Ginkgo (Ginkgo biloba); 3. Yulan Magnolia (Magnolia denudata), a Pennsylvania state champion; 4. Sugar Maple (Acer saccharum); 5. Red Maple (Acer rubrum) 6. Osage-orange (Maclura pomifera), blown down by a hurricane in 1954, just the rot-resistant trunk remains; 7. Cucumbertree Magnolia (Magnolia acuminata); 8. Baldcypress (Taxodium distichum); 9. Leatherleaf Mahonia (Mahonia bealei); 10. Tuliptree (Liriodendron tulipifera); 11. Yellow Buckeye (Aesculus flava); 12. River Birches - 2 (Betula nigra); 13. Giant Sequoia (Sequoiadendron giganteum), the largest giant sequoia in Pennsylvania and possibly in the eastern United States; 14. White Oaks -2 (Quercus alba); 15. Swamp White Oak (Quercus bicolor); 16. Sweetgums - 2 (Liquidambar styraciflua); 17. Corsican Pine (Pinus nigra spp. laricio); 18. Bald Cypress (Taxodium distichum); 19. American Linden (Tilia americana); 20. Common Pear (Pyrus communis); and 21. Oriental Spruce (Picea orientalis), a Pennsylvania state champion.
- Ornamentals: collections of flowering cherry (begun in 1951 with 45 plants representing 23 species and varieties); magnolia (begun 1951); crabapple (1951–1953); rhododendron (begun 1959 with more than 500 rhododendrons and 200 azaleas); holly; and lilac.
- Pinetum (34 ha / 85 acres, begun in 1954), containing pines, spruces, hemlocks, firs, cedars, cypresses and larches.
- Native Woodland Walk (begun in 1970).
- Meadow Maze, a recent four-ring labyrinth of meadow grasses based on a classical seven-ringed design.
- Pink Hill, a serpentine barren of serpentine stone with wildflowers.
- Uncultivated land (180 ha / 450 acres) that remain natural and contain 32 km / 17 miles of marked hiking trails.
- Wister Rhododendron Collection, a collection of more than 500 rhododendrons.

== Gallery ==
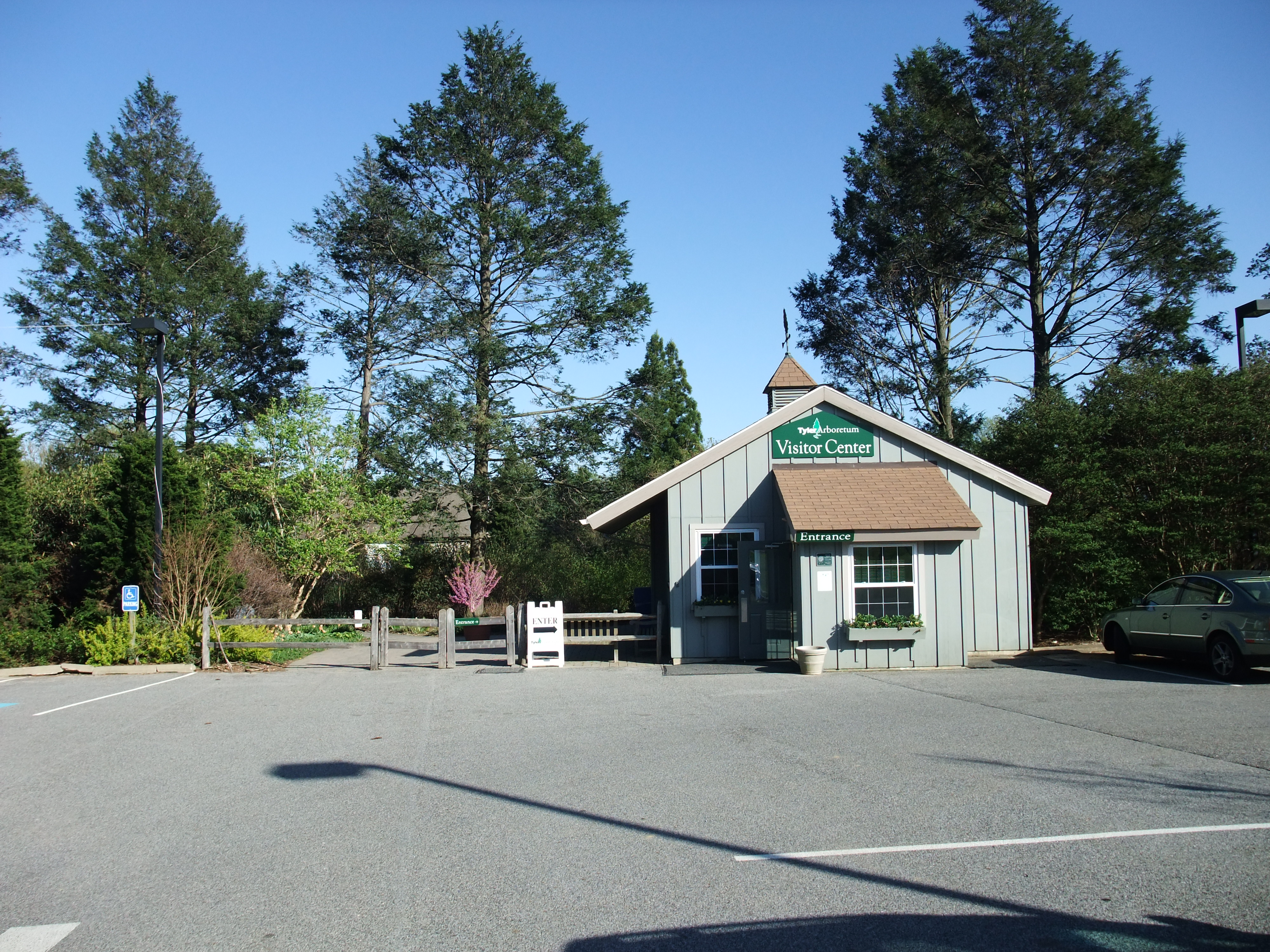
Visitor Center

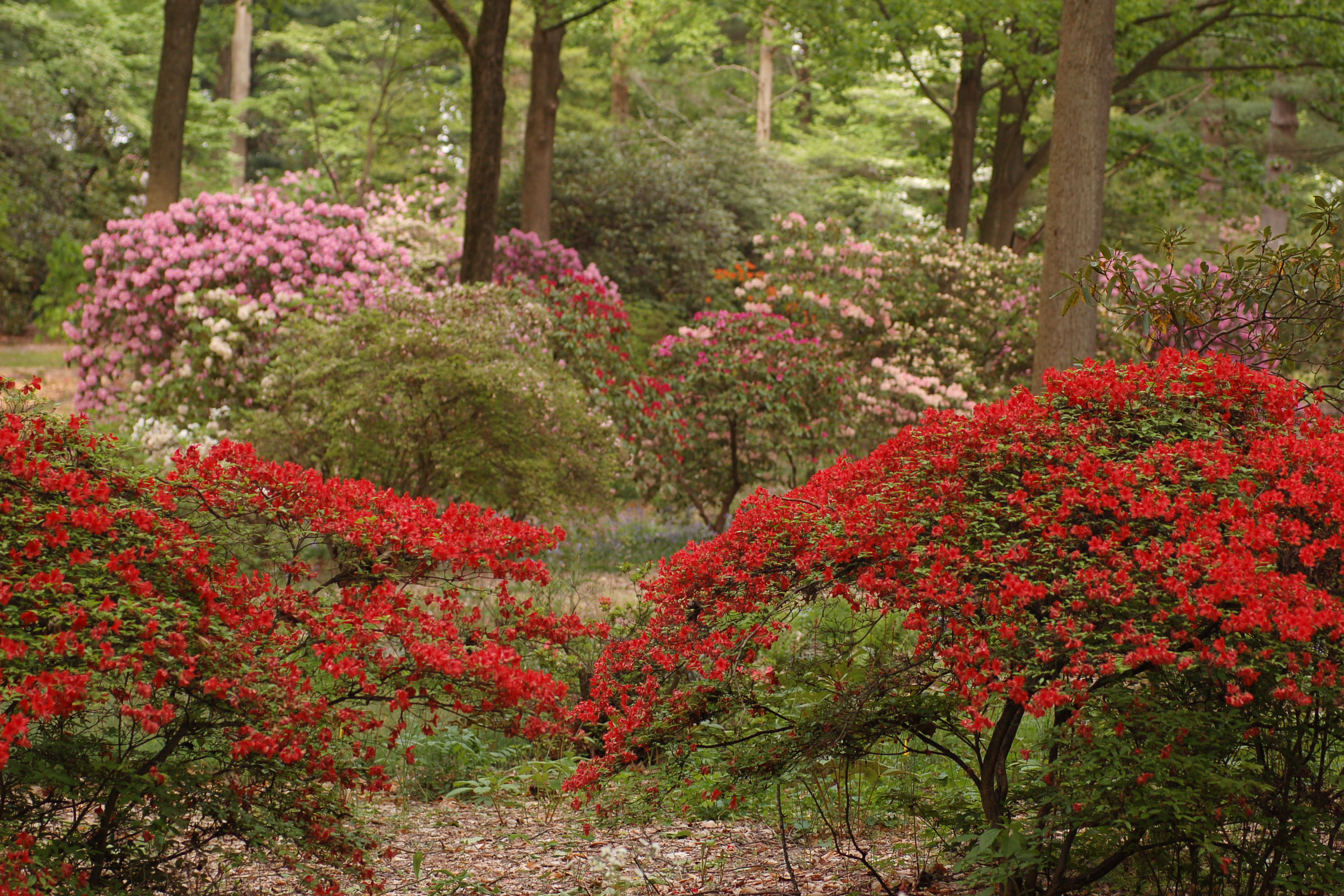
Rhododendrons from the Wister Rhododendron Collection

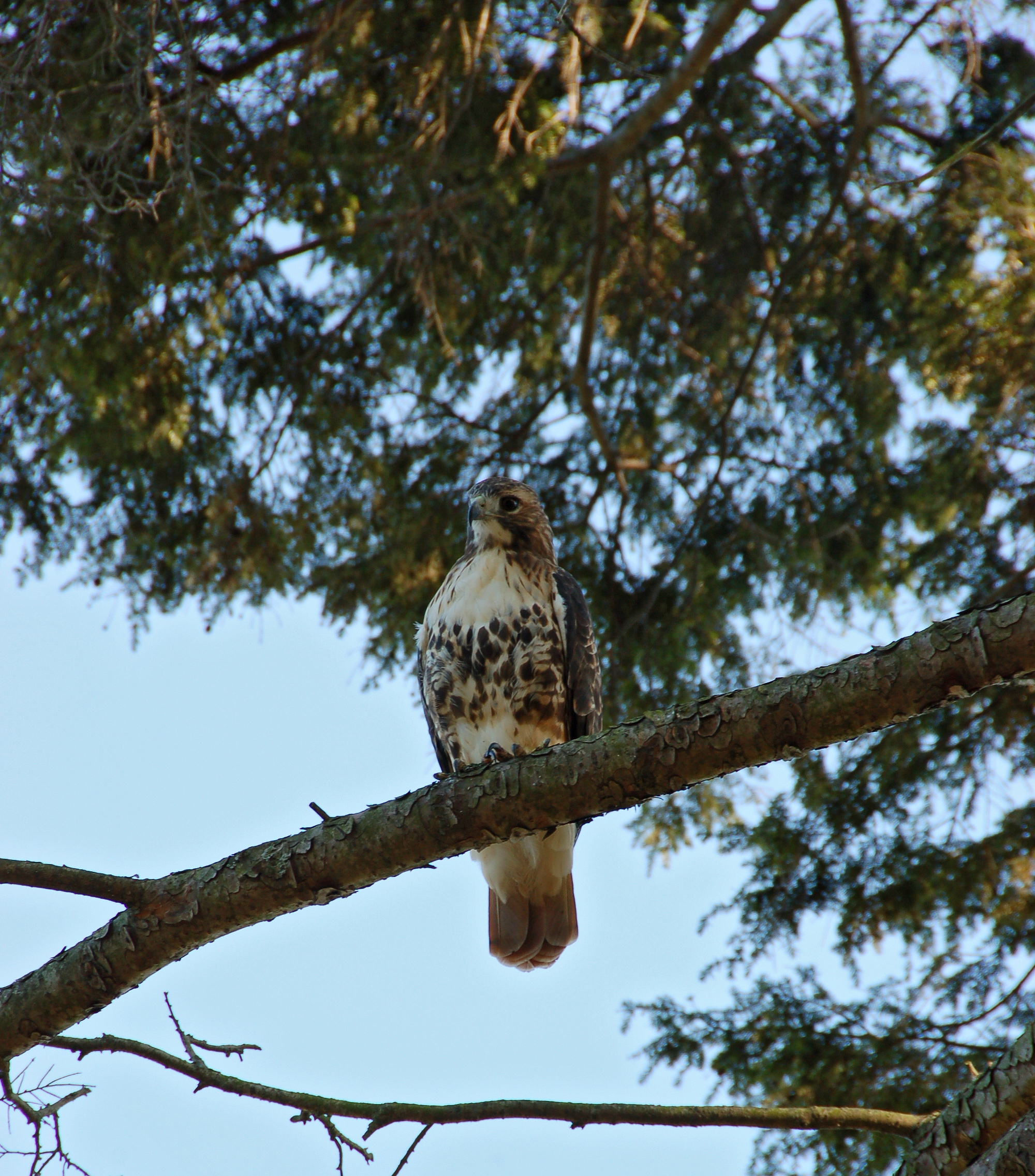
Red-tailed hawk (Buteo jamaicensis) on a tree branch.

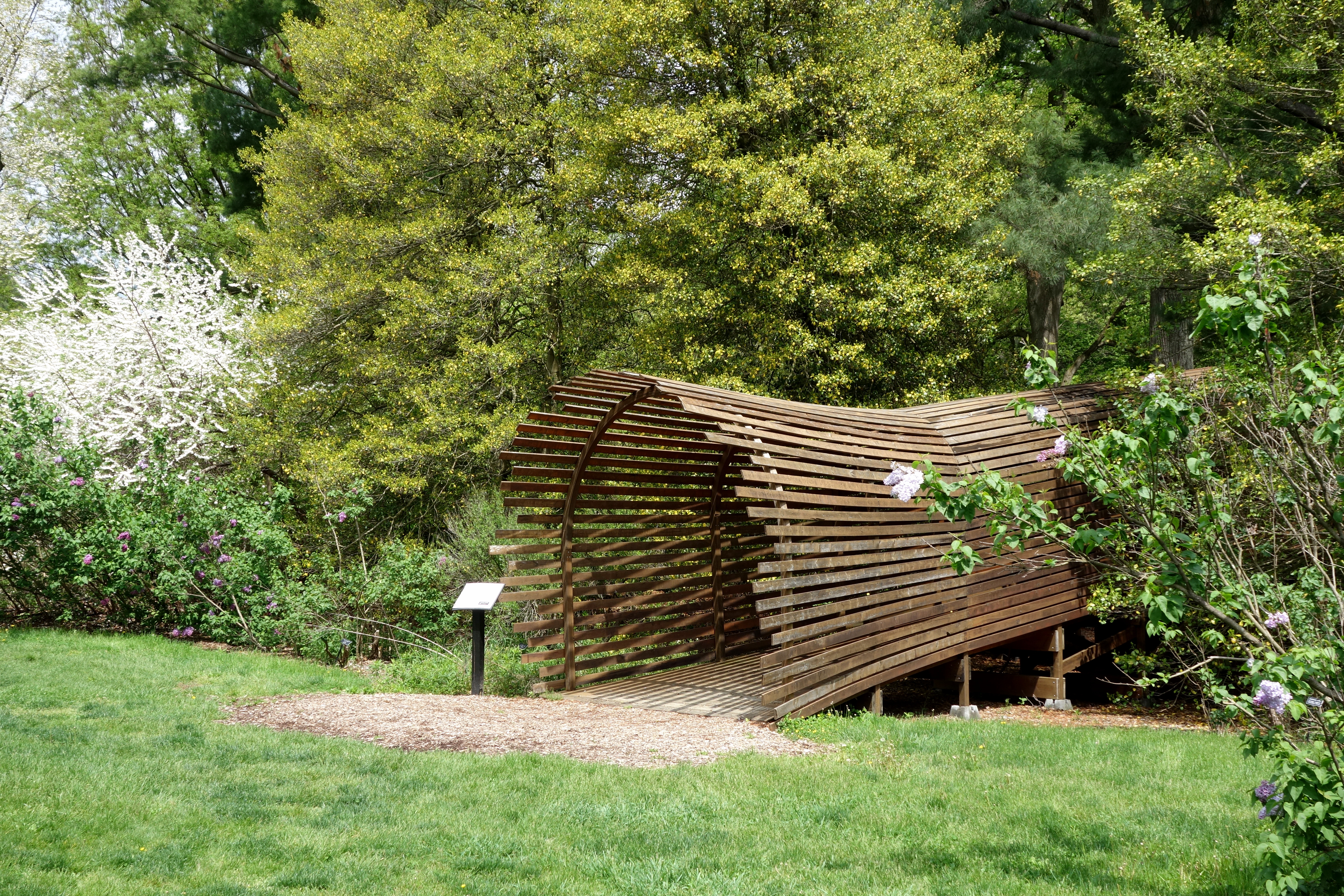
Pathway bridge.

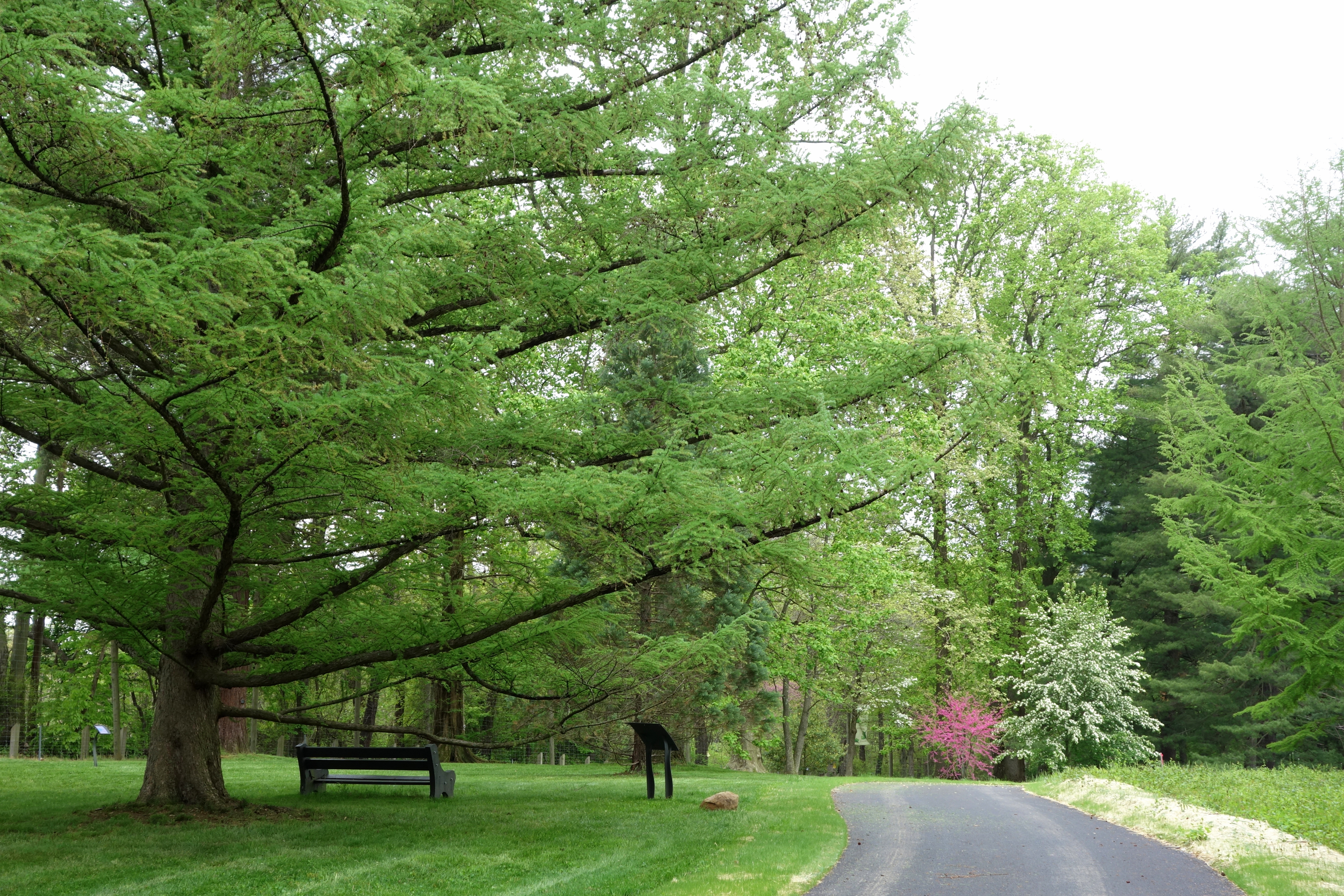
Information signs and benches are along many of the pathways.

== See also ==
- List of botanical gardens in the United States
- Taylor Memorial Arboretum - located about 10 miles (16 km) south
