= Pennsylvania Route 252 =

State highway in Pennsylvania, US

Pennsylvania Route 252

Route information
- Maintained by PennDOT
- Length: 19.880 mi (31.994 km)

Major junctions
- South end: PA 320 near Chester
- US 1 near Media; PA 3 in Newtown Square; US 30 in Paoli; US 202 in Tredyffrin Township
- North end: PA 23 in Valley Forge

Location
- Country: United States
- State: Pennsylvania
- Counties: Delaware, Chester, Montgomery

Highway system
- Pennsylvania State Route System; Interstate; US; State; Scenic; Legislative
← PA 251	→ PA 253

Pennsylvania Route 252 (PA 252) is a north–south state highway in the U.S. state of Pennsylvania that connects PA 320 in Nether Providence Township at its southern terminus to PA 23 in Valley Forge at its northern terminus. The route runs through the western suburbs of Philadelphia in Delaware, Chester, and Montgomery counties, including Nether Providence Township, the borough of Media, Upper Providence Township, Marple Township, Newtown Township, Easttown Township, Tredyffrin Township, and Upper Merion Township. The route intersects many roads including U.S. Route 1 (US 1) north of Media, PA 3 in Newtown Square, US 30 in Paoli, and US 202 in Tredyffrin Township.

The southernmost part of PA 252 was originally built as part of the Providence Road in 1684. PA 252 was designated by 1928 to run from PA 320 north of Chester north to US 122/PA 52 (now US 202) in King of Prussia. By 1960, the northern terminus was moved to PA 23 in King of Prussia. PA 252 was realigned to head to its current northern terminus at Valley Forge by 1970, running along a concurrency with US 202 (removed by 1980) for a distance north of Paoli and replacing a part of PA 363 (formerly PA 83) in the Valley Forge area.

== Route description ==
=== Delaware County ===
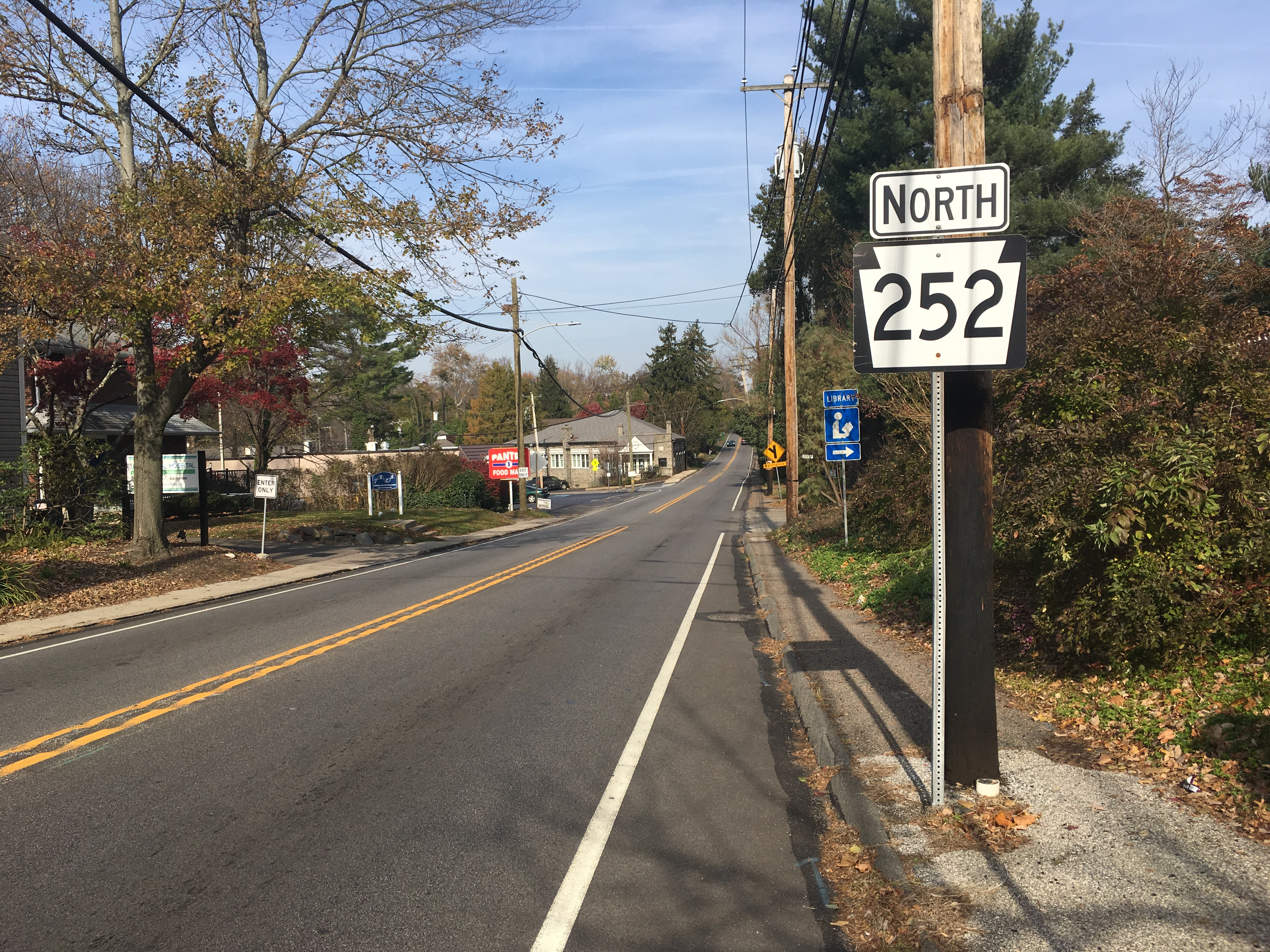
PA 252 northbound in Wallingford

PA 252 begins at an intersection with PA 320 north of the city of Chester in Nether Providence Township, Delaware County, heading north-northwest on two-lane undivided Providence Road. The road passes through wooded suburban residential neighborhoods, running to the west of Springhaven Country Club. The route heads into the community of Wallingford, where it passes to the east of Strath Haven High School and comes to a bridge over SEPTA's Media/Wawa Line west of Wallingford station. PA 252 continues north and enters the borough of Media, where it heads into commercial areas and intersects Baltimore Avenue. A block further north, the route intersects State Street at the point SEPTA's light rail Media–Sharon Hill Line crosses the road at-grade west of the Providence Road station. The road continues through residential areas in the eastern part of Media. PA 252 leaves Media for Upper Providence Township and continues past homes with some businesses. The route widens to a four-lane divided highway as it comes to an interchange with the US 1 freeway bypass of Media. Past this interchange, PA 252 becomes a four-lane undivided road with two northbound and southbound lanes, passing to the west of Rose Tree Park.

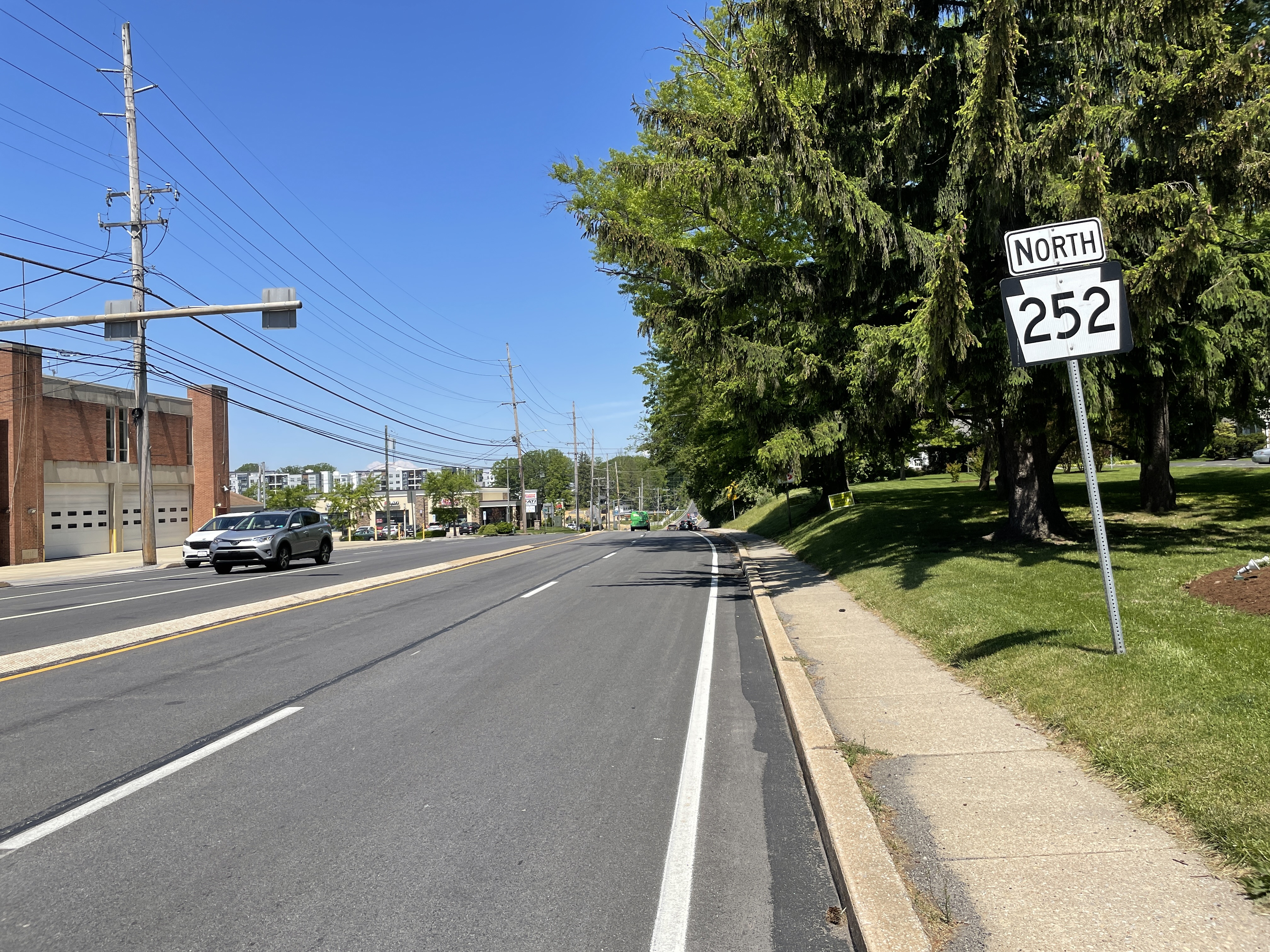
PA 252 northbound past PA 3 in Newtown Square

The route splits from Providence Road by curving north onto two-lane Palmers Mill Road, running through wooded residential areas. The road crosses Crum Creek on the dam that forms Springton Reservoir to the west, at which point it enters Marple Township. Past the reservoir, Palmers Mill Road turns to the east and PA 252 continues north on Newtown Street Road, running past more homes. The road passes to the west of the Marple Campus of Delaware County Community College before it heads into Newtown Township between the Media Line Road and Gradyville Road intersections. The route continues north through wooded suburban development. PA 252 turns northwest and heads through commercial areas as it comes to an intersection with PA 3 in the community of Newtown Square. Past this intersection, the road widens into a four-lane divided highway and passes more businesses before heading between a business campus to the west and residential areas to the east. The route curves north before heading northwest past housing developments. PA 252 passes to the southwest of Aronimink Golf Club before coming to an interchange with St. Davids Road and Newtown Street Road in the community of Wyola. Here, the name of the route changes to Darby Paoli Road and it narrows into a two-lane undivided road as it passes between wooded residential neighborhoods to the northeast and the Episcopal Academy to the southwest.

=== Chester and Montgomery counties ===
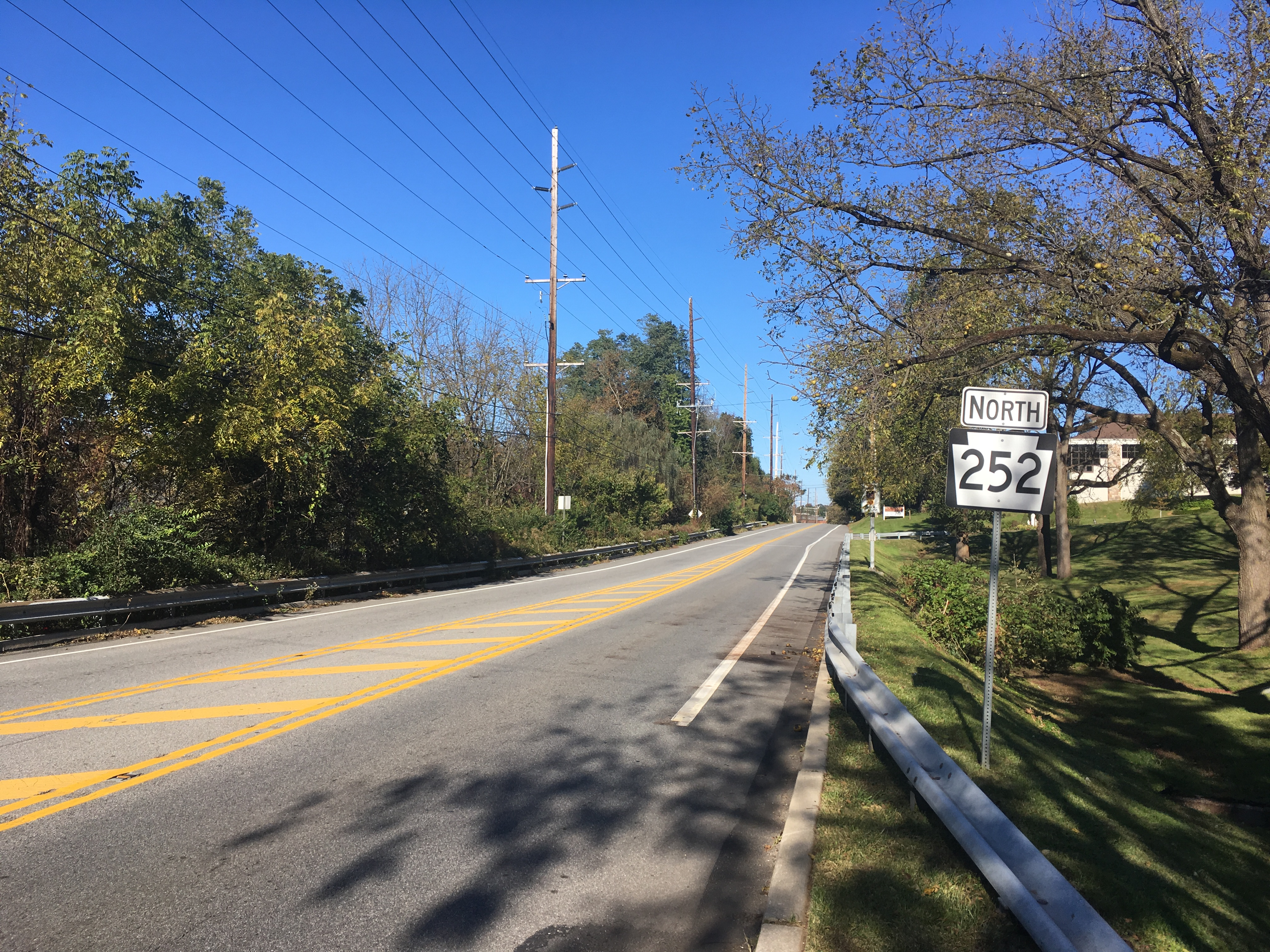
PA 252 northbound past Darby Road/Sugartown Road in Easttown Township

At the intersection with White Horse Road, PA 252 enters Easttown Township in Chester County and continues northwest through wooded areas of homes. The road passes to the east of Waynesborough Country Club before it comes to an intersection with Darby Road/Sugartown Road. At this intersection, the name of the route becomes Leopard Road and it passes more wooded development, crossing into Tredyffrin Township. PA 252 curves north and becomes a four-lane road, heading into commercial areas and coming to an intersection with US 30 (Lancaster Avenue) in the community of Paoli. Past this intersection, the road becomes Bear Hill Road and immediately passes under Amtrak's Keystone Corridor railroad line, briefly gaining a median as it passes under the railroad tracks. The route runs past homes and narrows back to two lanes before heading into forested areas. PA 252 widens back into a four-lane divided highway and comes to a bridge over Norfolk Southern's Dale Secondary railroad line, curving northeast. The road passes southeast of a residential neighborhood before it comes to an intersection with West Swedesford Road/Howellville Road.

At this point, the name of the route becomes Swedesford Road and it heads past business parks as a four-lane undivided road. The lanes of PA 252 split as it passes over the Chester Valley Trail and comes to a partial interchange with the US 202 freeway to the north, with a ramp from northbound PA 252 to northbound US 202 and a ramp from southbound US 202 to southbound PA 252. Following this, the route heads east-northeast as a two-lane undivided road, passing between the US 202 freeway to the north and businesses to the south. PA 252 curves east and turns northwest onto Valley Forge Road, immediately reaching an interchange with US 202. The route continues through suburban neighborhoods in Chesterbrook before coming to a bridge over the Pennsylvania Turnpike (Interstate 76). At this point, the road enters Valley Forge National Historical Park. PA 252 passes through fields within the park, turning west onto Valley Creek Road at the Baptist Road intersection. Upon intersecting Yellow Springs Road just east of the Knox Covered Bridge over the Valley Creek, the route turns north and enters Upper Merion Township in Montgomery County, winding north through forested areas along the east bank of the creek. PA 252 comes to its northern terminus at an intersection with PA 23 west of the community of Valley Forge.

== History ==
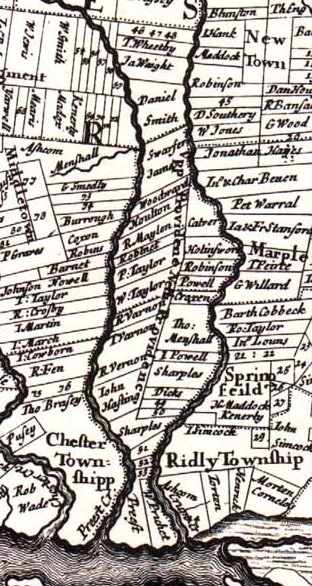
Providence Road (center of map) from Thomas Holme's 1687 map of Pennsylvania, running from north of Chester to north of present-day Media

In 1683, the Court of Chester County (which then included present-day Delaware County) approved the construction of "Providence Great Road", which included the route of present-day PA 252 from the southern terminus to north of Media. The road was built to provide access to Chester from the north. The Providence Road was said to have been completed in 1684. When Pennsylvania first legislated routes in 1911, what would become PA 252 was designated as Legislative Route 144, running between Media and King of Prussia. At this time, the entire route was unpaved. PA 252 was designated by 1928 to run from PA 320 north of Chester north to US 122/PA 52 (now US 202) in King of Prussia, following its current alignment north to Wyola, where it turned northeast and intersected US 30 in Wayne before continuing north to King of Prussia. Between Wyola and King of Prussia, PA 252 followed what is now unnumbered portions of St. Davids Road, Brooke Road, Wayne Avenue, Radnor Road, Croton Road, and King of Prussia Road. At this time, the entire route was paved. By 1928, the current alignment of PA 252 was an unnumbered road between Wyola and Paoli, a part of US 122 between Paoli and Valley Forge Road, and a part of PA 83 north of there.

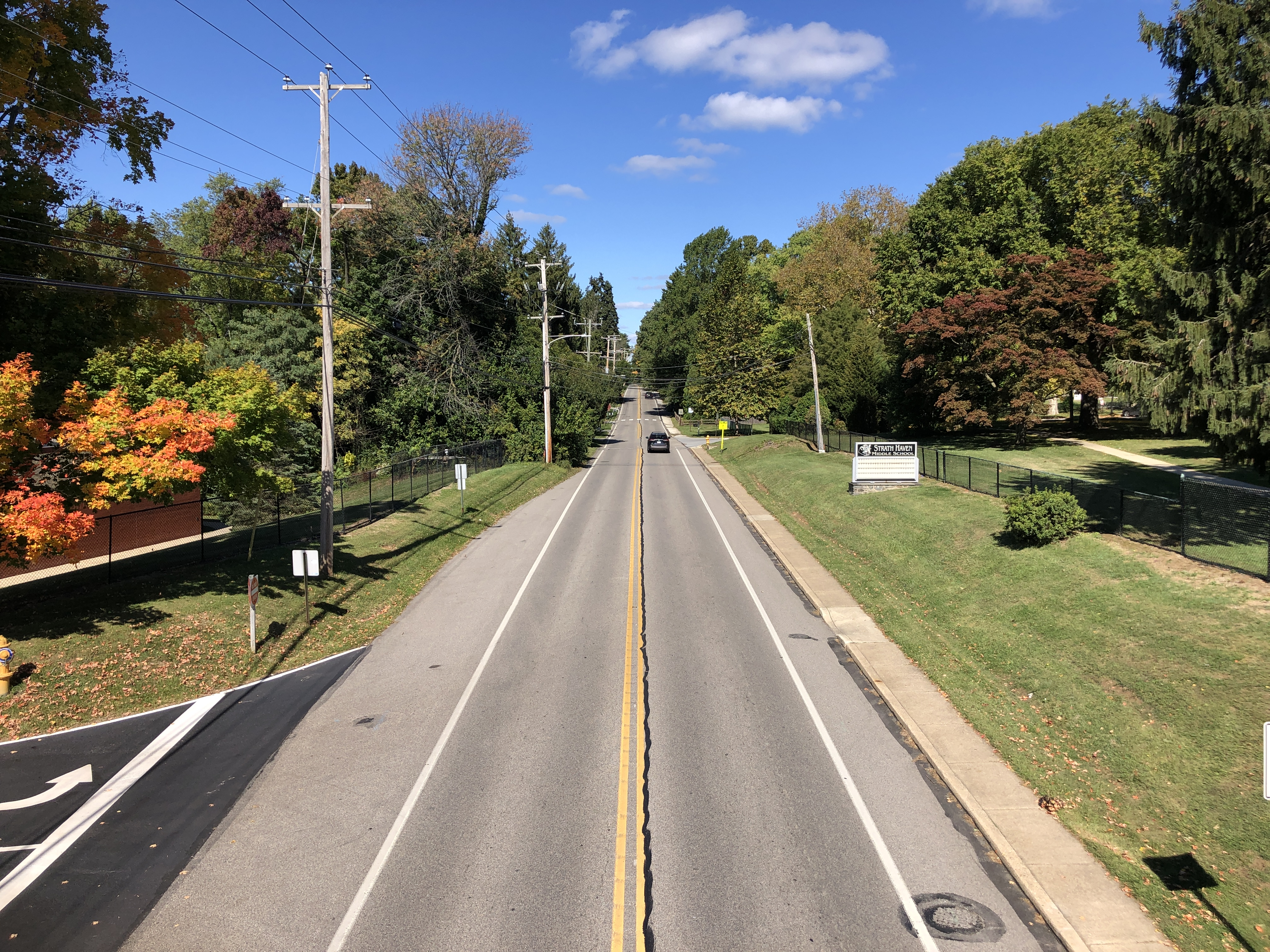
PA 252 northbound in Nether Providence Township

The northern terminus of PA 252 was moved to PA 23 (Gulph Road) along Croton Road in King of Prussia by 1960 after the original alignment to US 202 along King of Prussia Road was severed by the construction of I-80S/PA 43 (now I-76). By 1970, PA 252 was realigned to its current northern terminus at PA 23 near Valley Forge along its current alignment, running concurrent with US 202 between Paoli and the southern interchange with the US 202 freeway and replacing the PA 363 designation (which replaced PA 83 in 1961) along Valley Forge Road and Valley Creek Road. Also by this time, the route was widened into a divided highway between Newtown Square and Wyola. By 1980, the US 202 concurrency was removed from PA 252. Since 1980, PA 252 has undergone extensive improvement, particularly in and around the interchange with US 1. In 2013, PA 252 was widened to a four-lane highway between US 1 and Palmers Mill Road to improve traffic flow and increase traffic safety.

== Major intersections ==
County	Location	mi	km	Destinations	Notes
Delaware	Nether Providence Township	0.000	0.000	PA 320 – Swarthmore, Chester	Southern terminus
Delaware	Upper Providence Township	4.249	6.838	US 1 to I-476 – Lima, Springfield	Interchange
Delaware	Newtown Township	7.978	12.839	PA 3 (West Chester Pike) – West Chester, Broomall	
Delaware	Newtown Township	9.734	15.665	Wayne	Interchange; northbound access via Newtown Road, southbound access via St. Davids Road; Wayne not signed southbound
Chester	Tredyffrin Township	13.817	22.236	US 30 (Lancaster Pike) – Paoli, Malvern, Berwyn	
Chester	Tredyffrin Township	15.147	24.377	West Swedesford Road to US 202 south – West Chester	
Chester	Tredyffrin Township	15.944	25.659	US 202 north – King of Prussia	Interchange; northbound exit to US 202 north and southbound entrance from US 202 south
Chester	Tredyffrin Township	17.159	27.615	US 202 – West Chester, King of Prussia	Interchange
Montgomery	Upper Merion Township	19.880	31.994	PA 23 – Phoenixville, King of Prussia	Northern terminus
1.000 mi = 1.609 km; 1.000 km = 0.621 mi: Incomplete access

== PA 252 Alternate Truck ==
PA Route 252 Alternate Truck
- Location: Upper Providence Township – Newtown Square, Pennsylvania
- Length: 3.2 mi (5.1 km)
- Existed: 2013–present

Pennsylvania Route 252 Alternate Truck is a truck route around a weight-restricted bridge over the Crum Creek at the Springton Reservoir in Marple Township, on which trucks over 34 tons and combination loads over 40 tons are prohibited. The truck route follows Providence Road and PA 3 between Upper Providence Township and Newtown Square. It was signed in 2013.
