= Black Moshannon =

Black Moshannon may refer to the following locations in Pennsylvania:

- Black Moshannon Creek, a tributary of Moshannon Creek
- Black Moshannon Lake, a lake in Centre County
- Black Moshannon State Park, a Pennsylvania state park in Rush Township, Centre County
- Black Moshannon State Park Historic Districts are three historic districts in Rush Township
- Black Moshannon Observatory, a defunct astronomical observatory
- Black Moshannon Airport, a small airport in Rush Township, Centre County

== See also ==
- Moshannon (disambiguation)
