= Allegheny Front Trail =

Hiking trail in central Pennsylvania

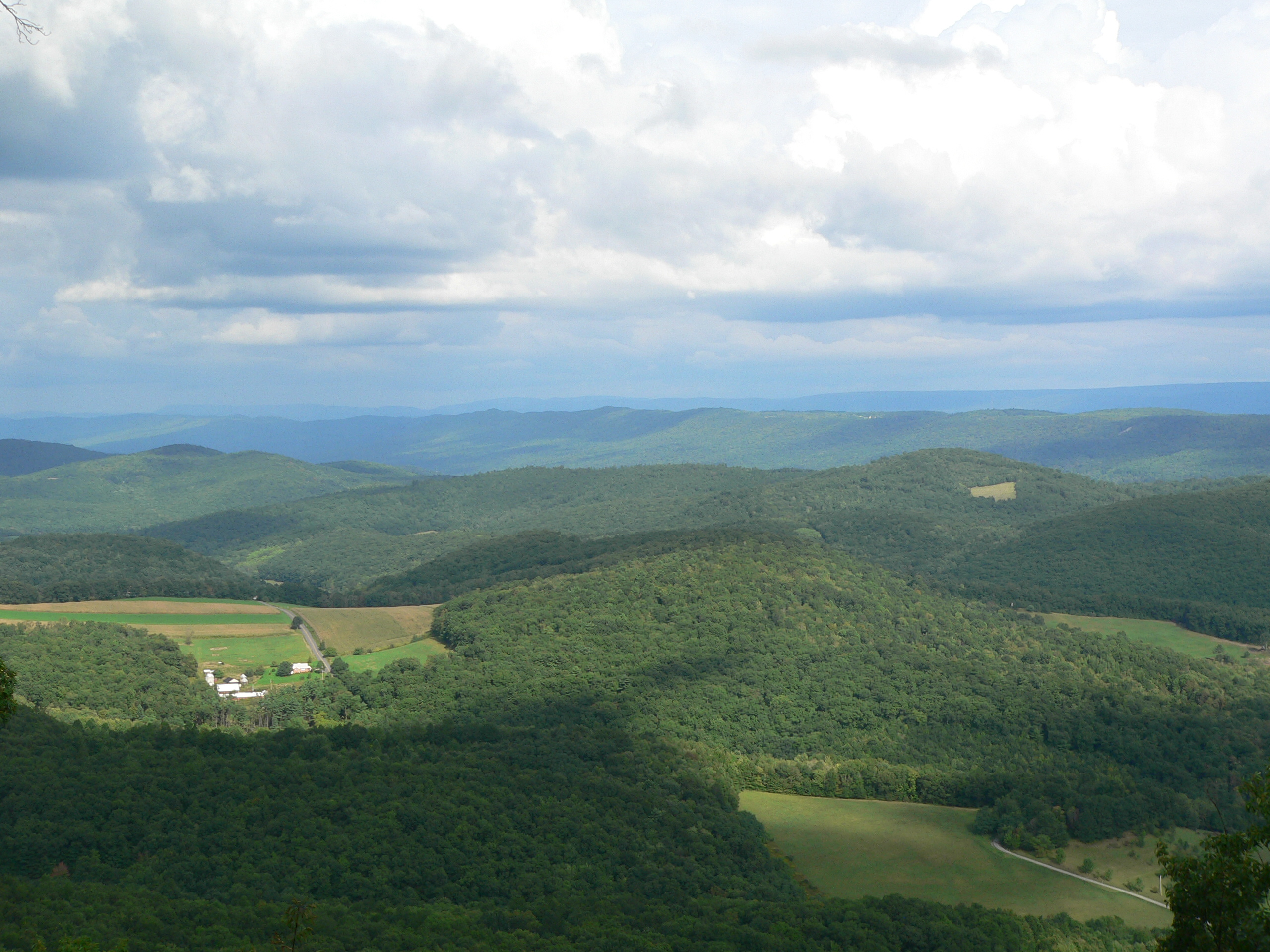
- The view from Ralph's Pretty Good View on the Allegheny Front Trail.
- Length: 41.9 mi (67.4 km)
- Location: Centre County, Pennsylvania, US
- Trailheads: Two on Pennsylvania Route 504 near Black Moshannon State Park
- Use: Hiking
- Elevation change: High
- Difficulty: Strenuous
- Season: Year-round
- Hazards: Uneven and wet terrain, rattlesnakes, mosquitoes, ticks, black bears

The Allegheny Front Trail is a 41.9-mile (67.4 km) hiking trail in central Pennsylvania, forming a loop through Moshannon State Forest and roughly encircling Black Moshannon State Park. It is known for visiting several vistas off the Allegheny Front, for walking along "Red" Moshannon Creek for a significant distance, and for visiting many different ecosystems ranging from wetlands to forested hollows to high meadows. The trail crosses Pennsylvania Route 504 twice and can also be reached from two side trails that originate in the state park.

== History and route ==
The origins of the Allegheny Front Trail date to the early 1980s, when the Rock Run Trails System was developed for cross-country skiers to the east of Black Moshannon State Park. The area became popular with hikers, leading to calls for an organized backpacking loop. The Allegheny Front Trail made use of a portion of the ski trail network, plus various existing trails in the state park and other areas of Moshannon State Forest, as well as sections of the Great Shamokin Path and Bald Eagle's Path that had been used by Native Americans for centuries. The trail was completed in the late 1990s. It was routed specifically to traverse both the edge of the Allegheny Front and the wetlands at the state park.

The route of the Allegheny Front Trail is described here in the clockwise direction. The main trailhead is at the corner of Pennsylvania Route 504 and Tram Road, 4.5 miles east of the state park. Heading south, the trail soon encounters the route of the Great Shamokin Path and follows it for a short distance. The trail then travels along the edge of the Allegheny Front for about three miles, and features several maintained vistas including two named in honor of trail founder Ralph Seeley.

The trail then curves to the west and reaches the boundary of Black Moshannon State Park at 6.5 miles. The trail traverses the state park for the next 3.4 miles. Within the park, the trail utilizes several short boardwalks over wetlands and views the park's artificial lake several times. After leaving the state park, the trail traverses a high plateau area until descending to Six Mile Run at 14.7 miles, encountering the Wolf Rocks formation and the former Dayton Dam, which was deconstructed in 2009 to restore the area's native ecosystem.

Now heading north, the trail travels alongside or parallel to Six Mile Run for several miles, and crosses PA 504 again at 21.7 miles. The trail climbs to the top of the plateau again and encounters a short side trail to a vista over "Red" Moshannon Creek at 25.9 miles. The trail descends to that creek at 26.3 miles and walks parallel to it for about the next 2.5 miles, with the creek's longtime coalmine-based pollution very visible to the hiker. Now trending east, the trail rises to the top of the plateau again and traverses high ground until descending again toward Black Moshannon Creek, which it crosses on a long footbridge at 32.2 miles. The trail then rises back to high ground, first alongside Benner Run, and reaches a junction with the Rock Run Trails System at 37.1 miles. The two trails are concurrent, southbound, until they reach PA 504. The Allegheny Front Trail reaches the trailhead on that highway again at 41.9 miles, ending the loop.
