= Moshannon =

Moshannon may refer to the following locations in Pennsylvania:

- Moshannon Valley, a river valley in the Allegheny Plateau
- Moshannon, Pennsylvania, a community in Centre County
- Moshannon Creek, a tributary of the West Branch Susquehanna River
- Moshannon State Forest,
- Moshannon Valley Correctional Center, an immigration detention center in Decatur Township, Clearfield County
- Moshannon Valley School District, a public school district in Clearfield County
- Moshannon Valley Junior/Senior High School, a public high school in Houtzdale, Pennsylvania

== See also ==
- Black Moshannon (disambiguation)
