= RRTS =

RRTS may refer to:

- Regional Rapid Transit System in India, also known as Namo Bharat
  - Delhi–Meerut Regional Rapid Transit System
  - Delhi–Alwar Regional Rapid Transit System
  - Delhi–Panipat Regional Rapid Transit System
- Rock Run Trails System, in Pennsylvania, United States
- Request for Request to Send, a component of the network protocol Multiple Access with Collision Avoidance for Wireless
- Road Roll-on/Roll-off Terminal System, another name for the Philippine Nautical Highway System
- Rural radiotelephone service, a component of rural radio service in the United States
