= Moshannon, Pennsylvania =

Unincorporated community in Pennsylvania, US

- Census designated place
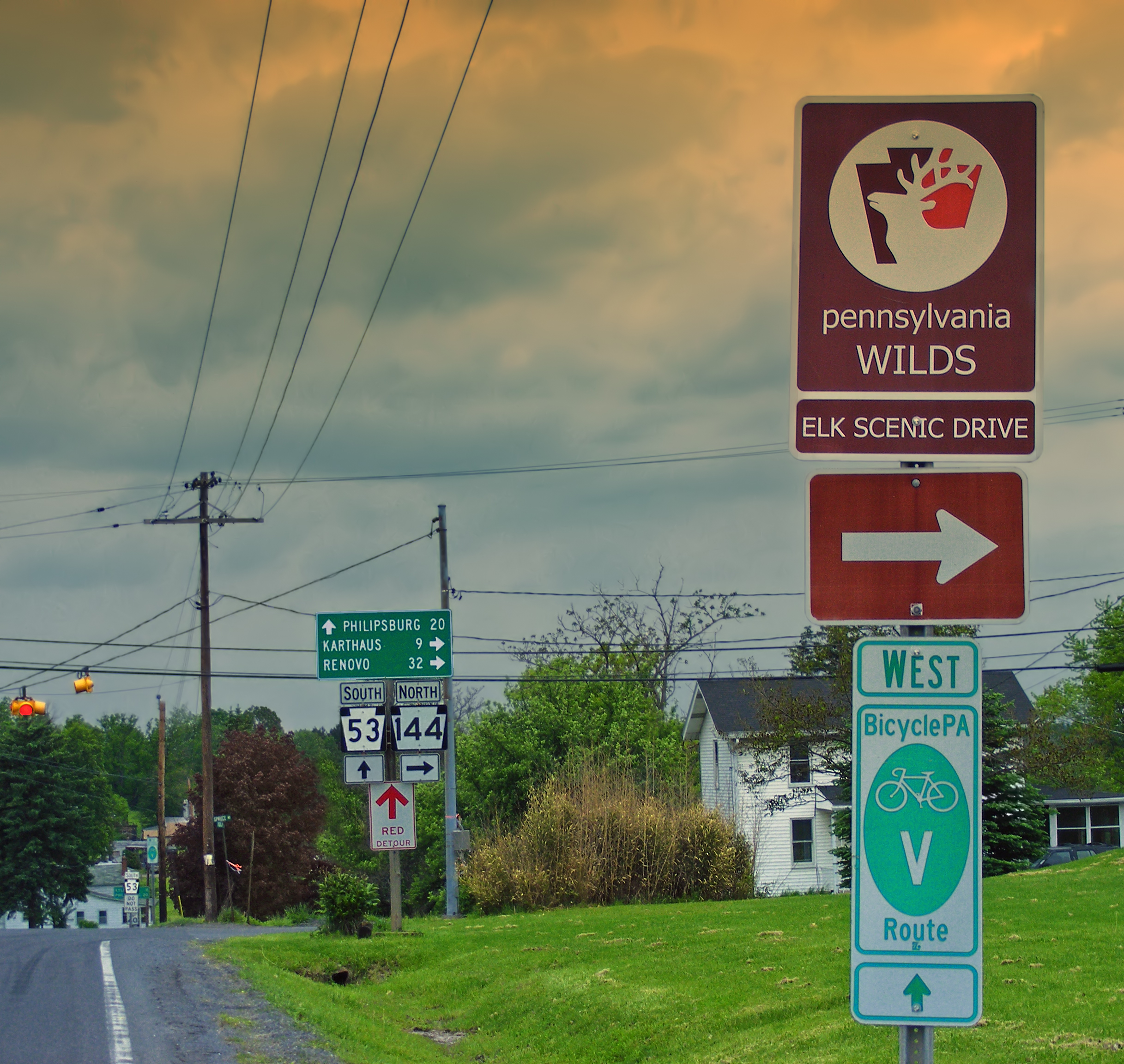
- Intersection of PA Routes 144 and 53

- Map showing Centre County in Pennsylvania

- Location in Pennsylvania Moshannon (the United States)
- Coordinates: 41°1′55″N 78°0′18″W
- Country: United States
- State: Pennsylvania
- County: Centre
- Township: Snow Shoe

Area
  - Total: 0.34 sq mi (0.87 km^{2})
  - Land: 0.34 sq mi (0.87 km^{2})
  - Water: 0 sq mi (0.00 km^{2})
- Elevation: 1,531 ft (467 m)

Population (2020)
  - Total: 213
  - Density: 635.8/sq mi (245.49/km^{2})
- Time zone: UTC−5 (Eastern (EST))
  - Summer (DST): UTC−4 (EDT)
- ZIP code: 16859
- FIPS code: 42-51240
- GNIS feature ID: 1181610

Moshannon is an unincorporated community and census-designated place (CDP) in Snow Shoe Township, Pennsylvania, United States. As of the 2010 census, the population was 281 residents. It is located 4 miles (6 km) northwest of Interstate 80 at the convergence of Pennsylvania Routes 53 and 144. Black Moshannon Creek, part of the West Branch Susquehanna River watershed, runs through a 200-foot-deep (60 m) valley half a mile (0.8 km) south of the town.

The community takes its name from Moshannon Creek, a Native American name purported to mean "moose stream".

== Demographics ==
Historical population
Census	Pop.	Note	%±
2020	213		—
U.S. Decennial Census
