= Black Moshannon Observatory =

Observatory in Pennsylvania, US

- Alternative names: bio
- Organization: Pennsylvania State University
- Location: Black Moshannon State Park
- Coordinates: 40.922°N 78.005°W
- Altitude: 738 meters (2,421 ft)
- Established: 1972
- Closed: after August 1995

Telescopes
- unnamed telescope: 1.6 m reflector

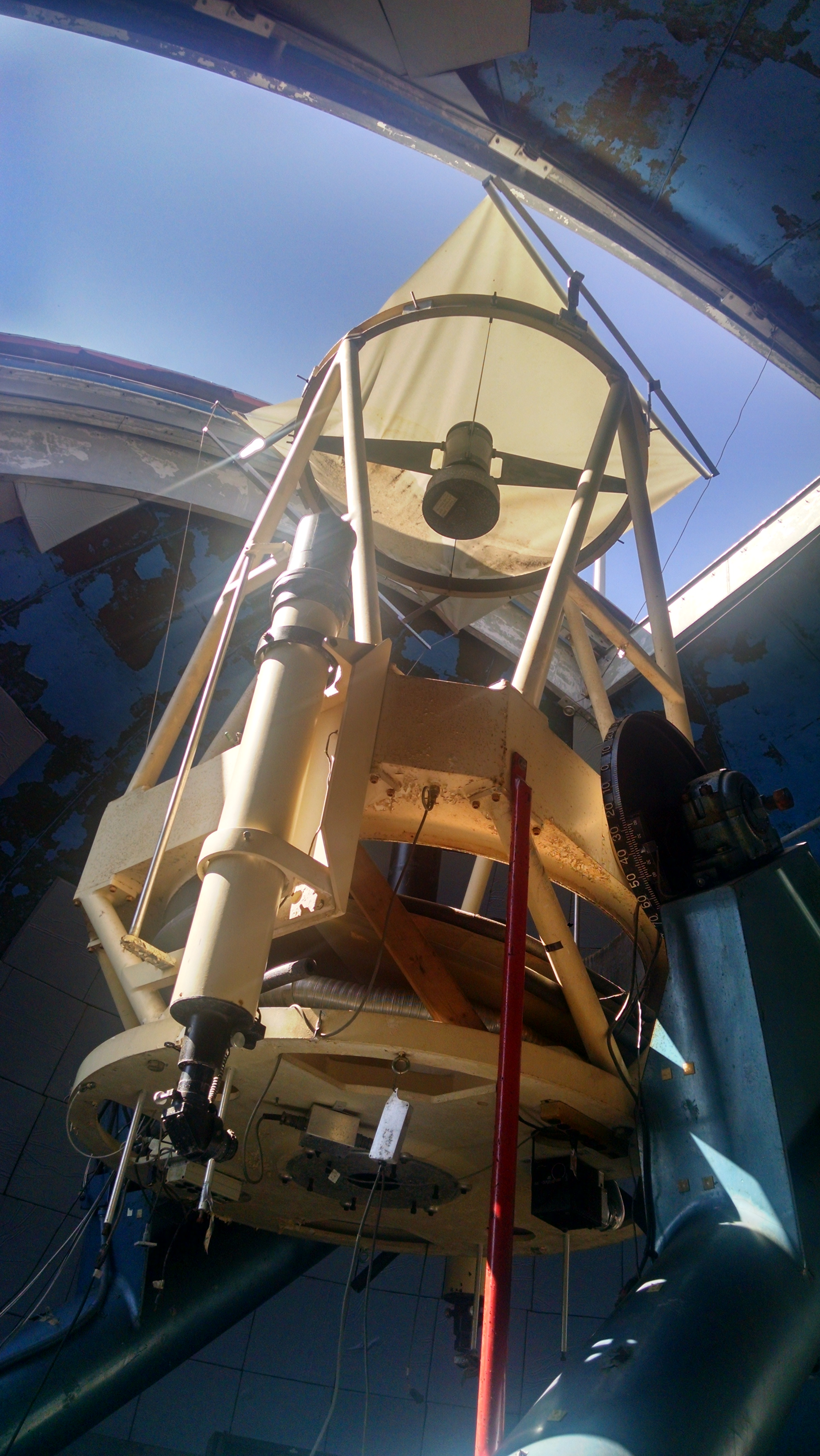
2016

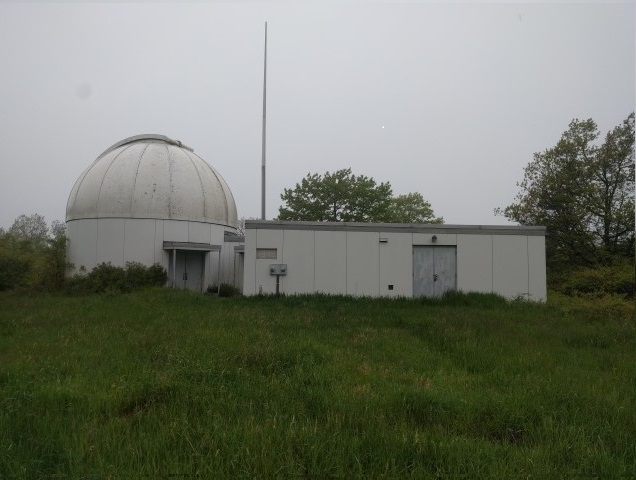
Black Moshannon Observatory as of May 28, 2017

The Black Moshannon Observatory (BMO) was an astronomical observatory owned and operated by Pennsylvania State University. Established in 1972, it was located in the central part of the U.S. state of Pennsylvania in Black Moshannon State Park, approximately 17 kilometers (11 miles) northwest of State College. The observatory was closed some time after August 1995.

== Telescope ==
The observatory's main telescope was a 1.6 m (63 in) reflecting telescope. The primary instrument attached to the telescope was a fiber-fed, cross-dispersed echelle spectrograph. Astronomers used this instrument to study chromospherically active stars, binary stars, and pre–main sequence stars.

== See also ==
- List of astronomical observatories
