= Opportunity zone =

American designation and investment program

An opportunity zone is a designation and investment program created by the Tax Cuts and Jobs Act of 2017 allowing for certain investments in lower income areas to have tax advantages. The program allows investors to defer capital gains taxes by reinvesting those gains into Qualified Opportunity Funds (QOFs) that develop or operate within these zones. If held for at least 10 years, any appreciation on the QOF investment becomes entirely tax-free.

Designed to unlock idle capital and drive economic revitalization, over 8,700 zones were designated across the U.S. While the program has successfully attracted billions in capital, it continues to evolve amid discussions about transparency, impact tracking, and equitable outcomes.

== History ==
Opportunity Zones were proposed by Senators Tim Scott, Cory Booker, and Representatives Ron Kind, Pat Tiberi and supported by Sean Parker's Economic Innovation Group. States may designate up to 25% of low-income census tracts as Opportunity Zones. Opportunity Zones were created under the 2017 Tax Cuts and Jobs Act, signed into law by President Donald Trump.

The first Opportunity Zones were designated in April 2018. There are 8,764 Opportunity Zones in the 50 states, and five U.S. possessions, including American Samoa, Guam, Northern Mariana Islands, Puerto Rico, and the Virgin Islands.

Not all Opportunity Zones are in low income communities. Per Internal Revenue Code Section 1400Z-1(e), up to five percent of the Opportunity Zones in each state can be non-low income tracts contiguous to low-income tracts. In December 2019, Treasury issued final regulatory guidance on Qualified Opportunity Fund investing.

Opportunity Zones 1.0 (OZ 1.0) has facilitated approximately $100 billion in investment, contributed to the creation of around 400,000 housing units, and supported roughly half a million jobs. Under the One Big Beautiful Bill Act (OBBBA), signed into law on July 4, 2025, the Opportunity Zone program was updated to Opportunity Zones 2.0 (OZ 2.0), which will become effective on January 1, 2027. The program was made permanent and revised to enhance its long-term economic impact. The updates introduced additional reporting requirements aimed at improving transparency and accountability, alongside revised eligibility criteria for designated zones.

On April 1, 2026, the U.S. Department of the Treasury published the final nomination framework for OZ 2.0. The framework established a 90-day nomination window beginning on July 1, 2026, during which state governors may nominate up to 25% of eligible census tracts. It also eliminated the contiguous tract designation option, tightened the median family income eligibility threshold from 80% to 70%, and removed the provision allowing blanket designation of all census tracts in Puerto Rico.

== Requirements ==
To qualify, the Opportunity Fund must invest more than 90% of its assets in a Qualified Opportunity Zone Property located in an Opportunity Zone. The property must be original use, or meet the definition of substantial improvement, meaning that the adjusted basis in the property must be doubled after purchase. Capital gain taxes are deferred for investments reinvested into investments in these zones and, if the investment is held for ten years, all capital gains on the new investment are waived. Despite the tax benefits and broad bipartisan support, the Opportunity Zones policy has its critics. Opportunity Zones are census tracts nominated by state authorities and certified by the IRS. A total of 8,764 census tracts have been so designated.

An investor who triggers an eligible gain (including capital gains and qualified 1231 gains) may reinvest the capital gain in a Qualified Opportunity Fund within 180 days in order to receive Opportunity Zone tax benefits.

=== Eligibility under OZ 2.0 ===
To qualify as an eligible tract under OZ 2.0, a census tract must meet the following criteria:

- Median family income below 70% of the applicable area median.
- No longer includes the contiguous-tract provision that allowed non-low-income tracts to qualify under OZ 1.0.
- Excludes the U.S. territories previously covered under the original program's blanket eligibility, including Puerto Rico, the U.S. Virgin Islands, and American Samoa.

Revenue Procedure 2026-14 identified 25,332 census tracts as eligible for OZ 2.0 designation, of which 8,334 are classified as entirely rural tracts.

== Tax benefits ==
There are four major tax benefits available to U.S. taxpayers who timely reinvest eligible gains into Qualified Opportunity Funds that comply with the Opportunity Zone statute and IRS regulatory guidance.

1. For tax reporting purposes, the eligible gain is deferred until December 31, 2026.
2. The tax liability on the reinvested eligible gains is reduced through a basis step-up of either 10 or 15 percent. Note: The 15% benefit expired after December 31, 2019. The 10% benefit expired after December 31, 2021. Investments in QOFs made after December 31, 2021, no longer receive this benefit.
3. The tax liability resulting from the sale of the Qualified Opportunity Fund is eliminated, through a step-up to fair market value upon disposition, so long as the Qualified Opportunity Fund has been held for a period of at least 10 years.
4. There is no depreciation recapture upon the sale of depreciated Qualified Opportunity Zone Property.

In order to report the investment to the IRS, the taxpayer needs to file IRS Form 8997 annually.

Prior to the law creating Opportunity Zones, an investor could defer capital gains taxes only through a like-kind exchange, i.e., by trading one asset for another asset in the same asset class by using a Section 1031 exchange. Opportunity Zones are similar, but there are several key differences. One such difference is that an Opportunity Zone does not require a like-kind exchange. Instead, by investing in a Qualified Opportunity Fund, an investor can defer any eligible gain (either capital gains or qualified 1231 gains) arising from the transaction of a property in any asset class (e.g., stocks, privately held business, real estate, collectibles, etc.).

== See also ==
- Keystone Opportunity Zone
- Empowerment zone
- Urban renewal
- Gentrification
- Special economic zone
