= Rock Run Trails System =

Cross-country skiing and hiking trail in Pennsylvania

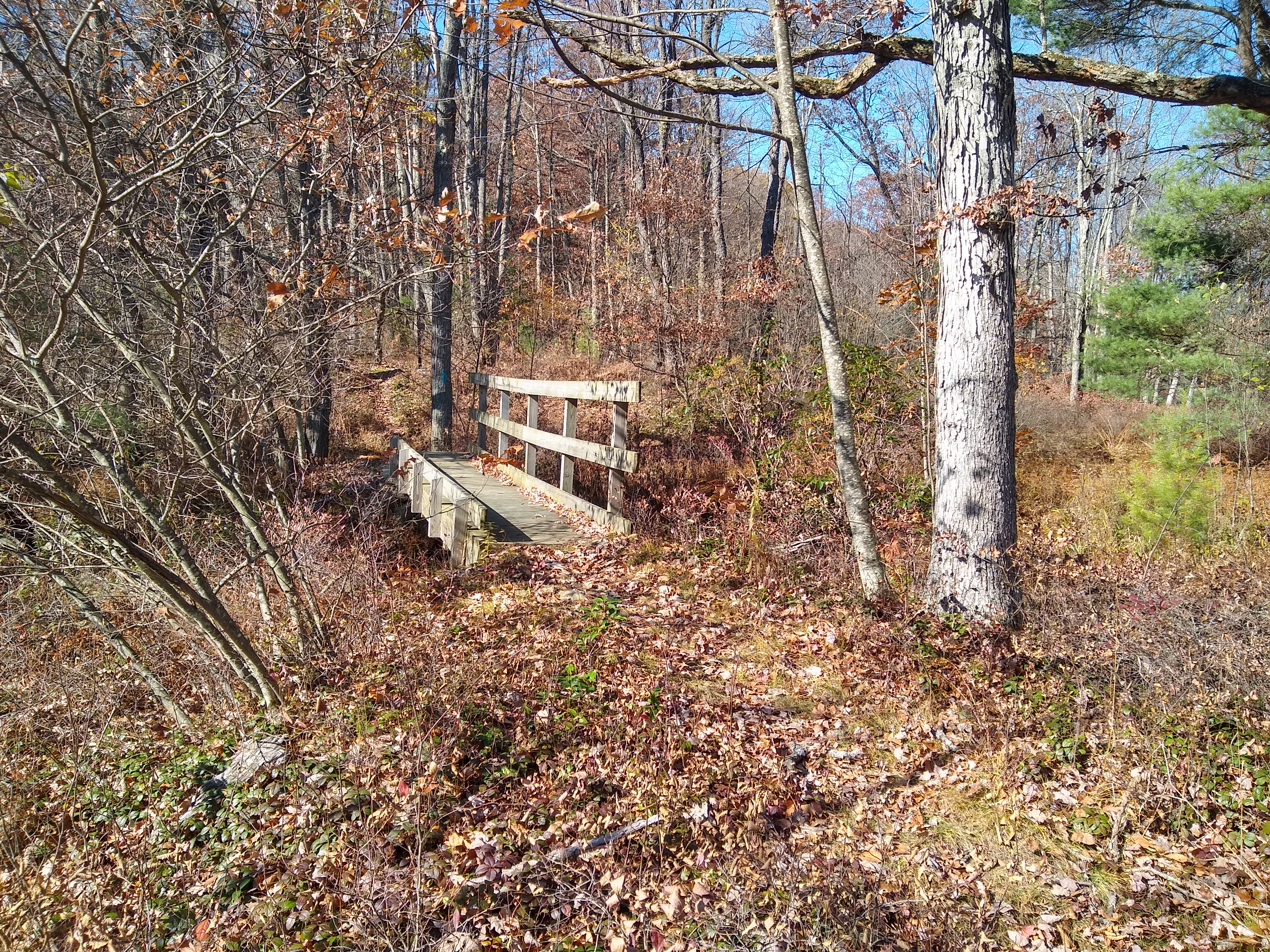
- Footbridge on the Junction Trail, in the Rock Run Trails System
- Length: 12.2 mi (19.6 km)
- Location: Centre County, Pennsylvania, US
- Trailheads: Pennsylvania Route 504 east of Black Moshannon State Park
- Use: Cross-country skiing, hiking
- Elevation change: Moderate
- Difficulty: Moderate
- Season: Year-round; hiking discouraged during winter months
- Hazards: Uneven and wet terrain, rattlesnakes, mosquitoes, ticks, black bears

The Rock Run Trails System (RRTS) is a 12.2-mile (19.6 km) cross-country skiing and hiking trail in central Pennsylvania, consisting of an entrance trail and loop in Moshannon State Forest. It follows several former logging railroad grades, some of significant historical interest. It shares part of its route with the Allegheny Front Trail.

== History and route ==
The Rock Run Trails System was developed for cross-country skiers to the east of Black Moshannon State Park in the early 1980s, by converting several former logging railroad grades. The area is known for its high elevation and significant snowfall, attracting many cross-country skiers, and the area already had several unofficial ski trails. After its completion, the RRTS became popular with hikers during the non-winter months, inspiring calls for the creation of a longer backpacking loop trail now known as the Allegheny Front Trail, which was completed in the late 1990s and which makes use of a portion of the RRTS.

The main trailhead for the RRTS is at the corner of Pennsylvania Route 504 and Tram Road, 4.5 miles east of the state park. The RRTS heads north across a high plateau area, following a path formerly known as the Entrance Trail. This segment is shared with the Allegheny Front Trail. A loop junction is reached at 2.0 miles, where the Allegheny Front Trail departs to the west. Following the RRTS loop counter-clockwise, the trail turns right onto the former Woodland Trail and traverses the east side of a wide valley formed by Rock Run and its tributaries. At 3.7 miles, reach an intersection with a cross-connector known as the Junction Trail, which leads 0.14 mile west to the other side of the RRTS loop, forming a shortcut. Back on the main RRTS loop, the trail crosses the Middle Branch of Rock Run at 5.3 miles and makes a sharp U-turn back to the south, now following the former Forks Trail, which utilizes switchbacks built for an old logging railroad to climb the side of the valley.

The Allegheny Front Trail rejoins the RRTS at 7.4 miles, and the two are concurrent for the rest of their respective distances. The junction with the other end of the short Junction Trail is reached at 8.4 miles. At 10.1 miles, reach the end of the loop at the junction with the Entrance Trail that was encountered earlier. Skiers or hikers following just the RRTS will complete this segment for the second time but in the opposite direction. The two trails continue south until reaching the trailhead on PA 504, with the RRTS ending after 12.2 miles.
