= Mid-State Regional Airport =

Airport in Centre County, Pennsylvania, US

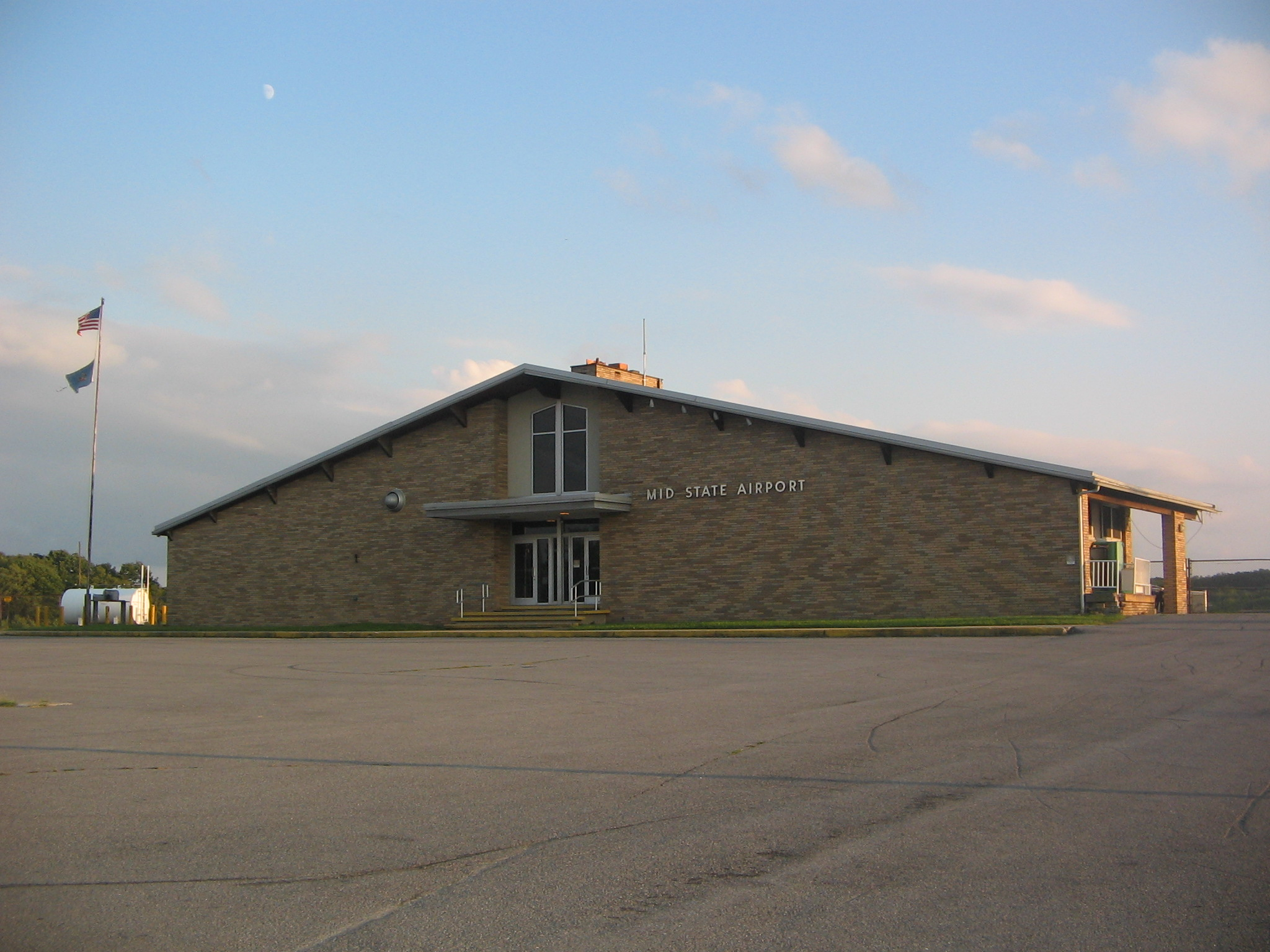
- Main building
- IATA: none; ICAO: KPSB; FAA LID: PSB

Summary
- Airport type: Public
- Owner: Mid-State Regional Airport Authority
- Serves: Philipsburg, Pennsylvania
- Location: Rush Township, Centre County, Pennsylvania
- Elevation AMSL: 1,909 ft / 582 m
- Coordinates: 40°53′00″N 78°05′14″W
- Interactive map of Mid-State Regional Airport

Runways
Direction	Length		Surface
Direction	ft	m	Surface
16/34	5,711	1,741	Asphalt
6/24	5,006	1,526	Asphalt

Statistics (2007)
- Aircraft operations: 2,550
- Source: Federal Aviation Administration

Mid-State Regional Airport (ICAO: KPSB, FAA LID: PSB) (Mid-State Airport) is a small airport in Rush Township, Centre County in Pennsylvania, between Black Moshannon State Park to the east and Moshannon State Forest.

The airport is 9 miles (14 km) east of Philipsburg, 5 miles (8.0 km) from U.S. Route 322 and 10 miles (16 km) from Interstate 80.

== History ==
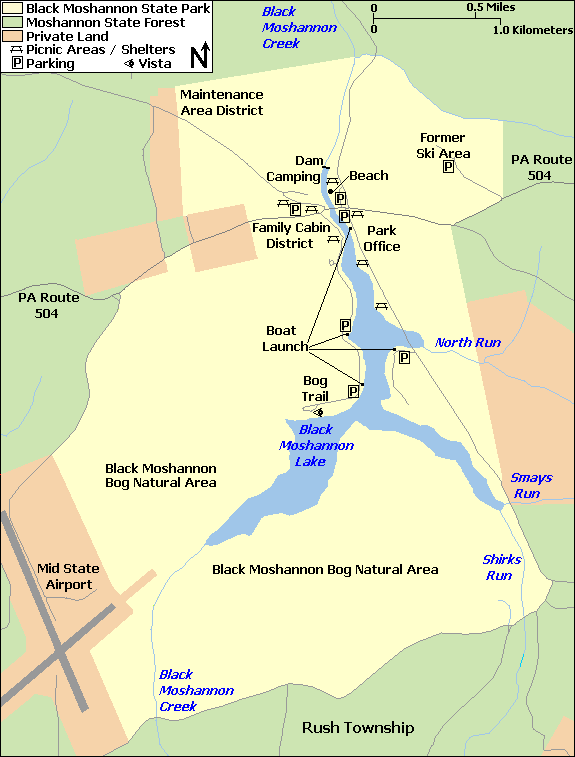
Location of Mid-State Regional Airport and Black Moshannon State Park

"Black Moshannon Airport" was built on land taken from Black Moshannon State Park and Moshannon State Forest just before the Second World War, and was operational by 1942, hosting a Civil Air Patrol training exercise for nearly 300 planes on May 30, 1942. It was renamed "Mid-State Airport" in 1962.

The March 1951 diagram shows the 163/343 runway 3400 feet long and the 056/236 runway 3000 feet. In May 1962 both runways were 5000 feet; in September 1968 16/34 was 5710 feet.

In 1949-53 All American Airways DC-3s stopped at Albert airport north of Philipsburg 40.9717°N 78.243°W. Allegheny Airlines moved to PSB in 1953–54; Allegheny Commuter took over from 1973 to 1981. The airport is 20 miles (32 km) from State College and Pennsylvania State University; over 75% of the passengers were from the State College and Bellefonte area. In 1978 Allegheny Commuter began shifting to University Park Airport, owned by Penn State; Mid-State Regional Airport now has no scheduled airline.

In 2008 the name is "Mid-State Regional Airport" and it has been designated a Keystone Opportunity Zone (KOZ). The KOZ portion of the airport is on 484 acres (1.96 km^{2}) to encourage business growth and is designated a KOZ through December 31, 2010. However, there are limitations in state law that prohibit any further development on park or forest lands.

== Facilities ==
Mid-State Airport covers 500 acres (2.0 km^{2}) and has two asphalt runways: 16/34 is 5,711 x 100 ft (1,741 x 30 m) and 6/24 is 5,006 x 100 ft (1,526 x 30 m). In the year ending June 30, 2007 the airport had 2,550 aircraft operations: 98% general aviation and 2% military. Two aircraft are based at the airport.

Runway 16/34 is connected to the airport ramp by 69-foot (21 m) wide taxiway A and 50-foot (15 m) wide taxiways D and E. D and E connect to the east side of the runway, with D leading to the large hangar and E to the smaller T-hangar. Runway 6/24 is connected to the airport ramp by 96-foot (29 m) wide taxiway B, and 50-foot (15 m) wide taxiway C at the 24-end of the runway. All of the taxiways are asphalt except for E, which is turf for the last 240 feet (73 m) before the runway.

== Other Users ==
Based at Mid-State Regional Airport is the Civil Air Patrol Mid-State Composite Squadron 239. The Pennsylvania Bureau of Forestry bases a fire fighting aircraft at the airport during forest fire season.

The Central Pennsylvania Region Sports Car Club of America holds autocross races at the airport. The airport remains active during the races; when an aircraft wishes to land, the race will be suspended, the aircraft will land, and racing will resume. This is possible due to the nature of autocross racing, where one car is on the course at a time.

== See also ==
- List of airports in Pennsylvania
