= Keystone Opportunity Zone =

Economic empowerment zone

Keystone Opportunity Zones (KOZ) are specific commercial or industrial areas with greatly reduced or no tax burden for property owners, residents and businesses throughout the Commonwealth of Pennsylvania. Pennsylvania has the nickname of the Keystone State, hence the name. The first KOZ's were established in 1999 by the Pennsylvania State Legislature and signed into law by Tom Ridge, who was then the Governor of Pennsylvania. As of 2008, KOZ's are still being supported by continuing acts of the state legislature and the former governor Ed Rendell. The zones are located throughout Pennsylvania in 12 separate regions: Northwest, Southwest, North Central, Southern Alleghenies, Northern Tier, Central, South Central, Lackawanna/Luzerne, Schuylkill/Carbon, Lehigh Valley, Southeast, and Philadelphia. Many of the sites are located in pre-existing airports and industrial parks.

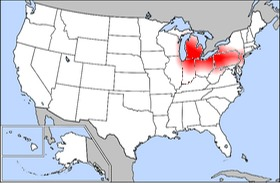
Rust Belt, highlighted in red

Pennsylvania is part of the Rust Belt, a strip of states across the northeastern and midwestern parts of the United States. These states were formerly industrial powers, but many of their industries have since left, leaving behind vast expanses of factories, mills, and office buildings that have begun to decay or rust. Some of these areas in Pennsylvania have been named Keystone Opportunity Zones with the idea of re-establishing and creating industrial and commercial centers throughout the state. Other KOZ's include newly zoned industrial parks and new and old corporate office spaces. Examples of Pennsylvania KOZ's include the Mid-State Regional Airport in Centre County, and the Cira Centre, a 28-story office building in Philadelphia.

Keystone Opportunity Zones are designated by local communities and approved by the state. Businesses or companies that are new to Pennsylvania must locate within one of the designated zones to receive tax benefits. Businesses and companies that are already well established in Pennsylvania may become obtain KOZ benefits by increasing full-time employment within one year after receiving KOZ status or by making capital investments equal to 10 percent of the previous years gross revenue.

Olympus Corporation, a Japanese company specializing in optics and imaging, opened its American headquarters in a Keystone Opportunity Zone in Upper Saucon Township, Lehigh County in 2006. The optics and imaging company was drawn to Pennsylvania by the tax benefits available in a KOZ. Other companies to recently move to or open new offices in Pennsylvania include Duke Energy, International Paper, DuPont, and Caremark Rx.

== See also ==
- Opportunity zone
