= Black Moshannon Creek =

River in Pennsylvania, United States

Coordinates: 41.02320°N 78.00775°W

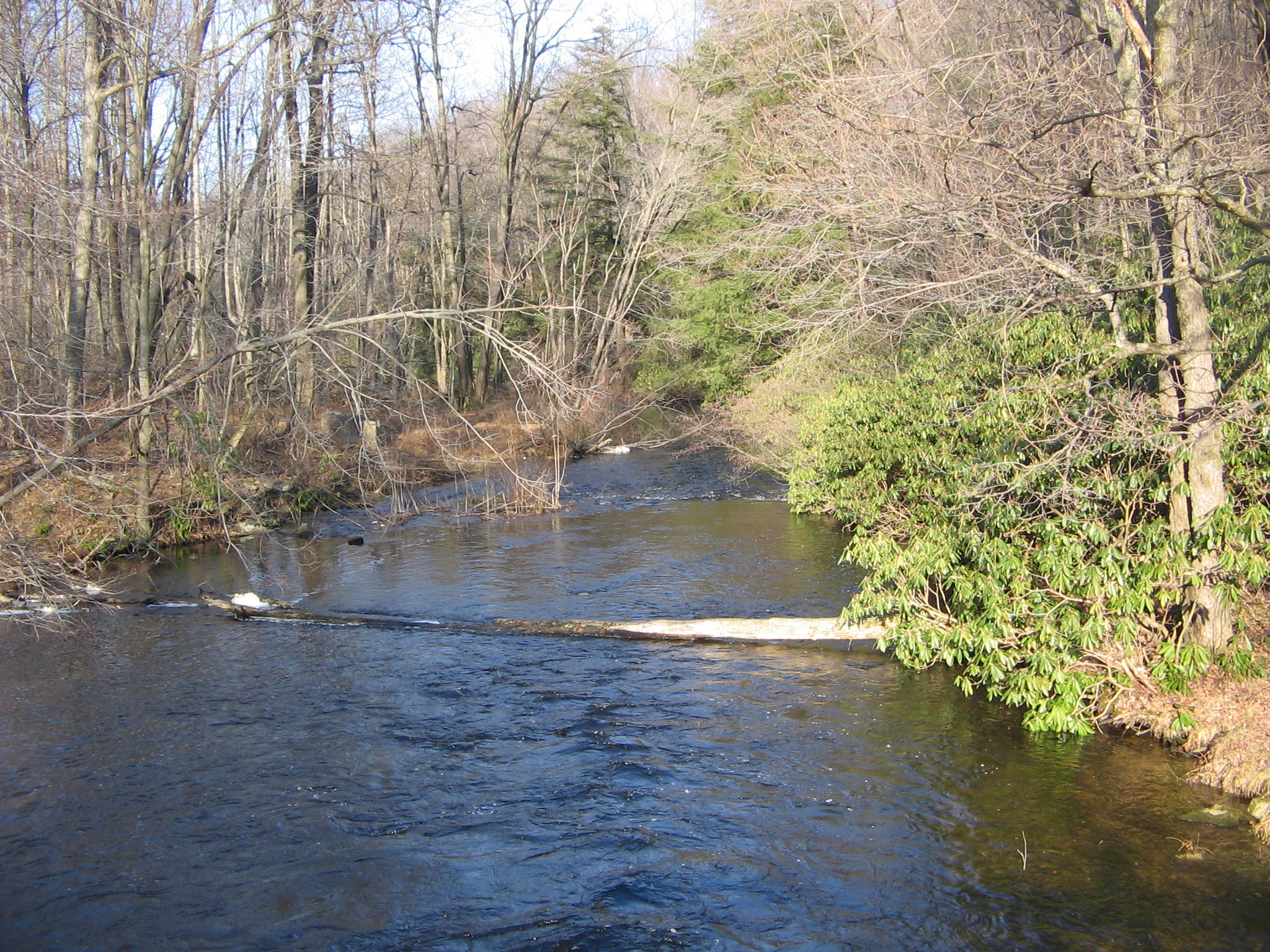
Black Moshannon Creek, just downstream of the dam in Black Moshannon State Park

Black Moshannon Creek is a 22.9-mile-long (36.9 km) tributary of Moshannon Creek in Centre County, Pennsylvania, in the United States.

The name Moshannon is said to be derived from the Native American "Moss-Hanne," meaning "moose stream." However, as recognized by Gertler, the North American moose was not native to central Pennsylvania. More likely, the name means "elk stream" from the Lenape word Mos'hanna'unk, which means "elk river place." See Handbook of tribal names of Pennsylvania, together with signification of Indian words; also A History of Great Council of Pennsylvania with articles pertaining to the Improved Order of Red Men by Donnalley, Thomas K. Published 1908, page 40.

Historically, Black Moshannon Creek was also known as "Little Moshannon Creek."

Black Moshannon Creek is born atop the Allegheny Plateau from clear springs and small streams which flow through bogs that form the watershed for 250-acre (100 ha) Black Moshannon Lake in Black Moshannon State Park. From the lake, the creek drops off the plateau and joins Moshannon Creek 17.8 miles (28.6 km) later, downstream of the community of Moshannon.

At higher water levels, the stream is a solid Class III whitewater run.

== See also ==
- List of rivers of Pennsylvania
