= Moshannon Creek =

Stream in the U.S. state of Pennsylvania

Coordinates: 40.84098°N 78.29344°W

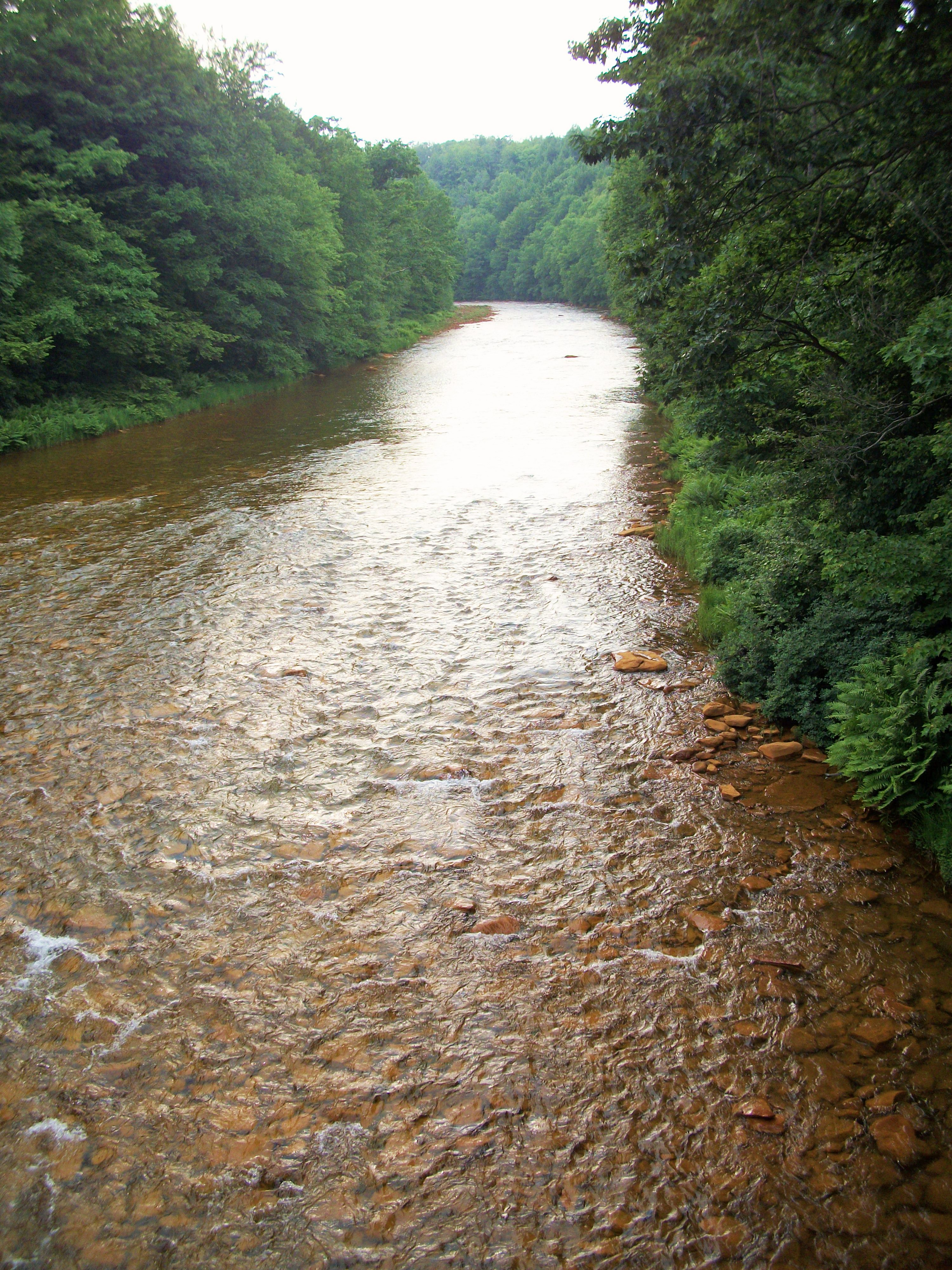
Moshannon Creek is known as the Red Moshannon for its red coloring.

Moshannon Creek is a 57.4-mile-long (92.4 km) tributary of the West Branch Susquehanna River in Centre County, Pennsylvania in the United States. Throughout its length, it serves as the boundary between Centre and Clearfield counties.

The name Moshannon is said to be derived from the Native American "Moss-Hanne," meaning "moose stream." However, as recognized by Gertler, the North American moose was not native to central Pennsylvania. More likely, the name means "elk stream" from the Lenape word Mos'hanna'unk, which means "elk river place." See Handbook of tribal names of Pennsylvania, together with signification of Indian words; also A History of Great Council of Pennsylvania with articles pertaining to the Improved Order of Red Men by Donnalley, Thomas K. Published 1908, page 40.

Moshannon Creek, commonly called the Red Moshannon or Red Mo, is noted for its reddish-orange rocks, banks and water caused by an iron compound that precipitates out of the acidic waters that seep into the stream from numerous old coal and clay mines in the basin.

While the acidity is a detriment to fish, wild cranberry appear to thrive in the environment.

The name Red Mo is also used to distinguish it from the smaller tributary Black Moshannon Creek which joins the Red where PA Route 53 crosses the creek.

The Red Moshannon is the site of an annual canoe and kayak race known as the Red Moshannon Downriver Race which has been held on the last Saturday in March since 1967. The race course covers approximately 7 miles (11 km) from the Peale bridge near the town of Grassflat to the Rt. 53 bridge and includes several class 1 and class 2 whitewater sections. The course record is 39 minutes, 29 seconds, set in 1993 by Brad Nelson.

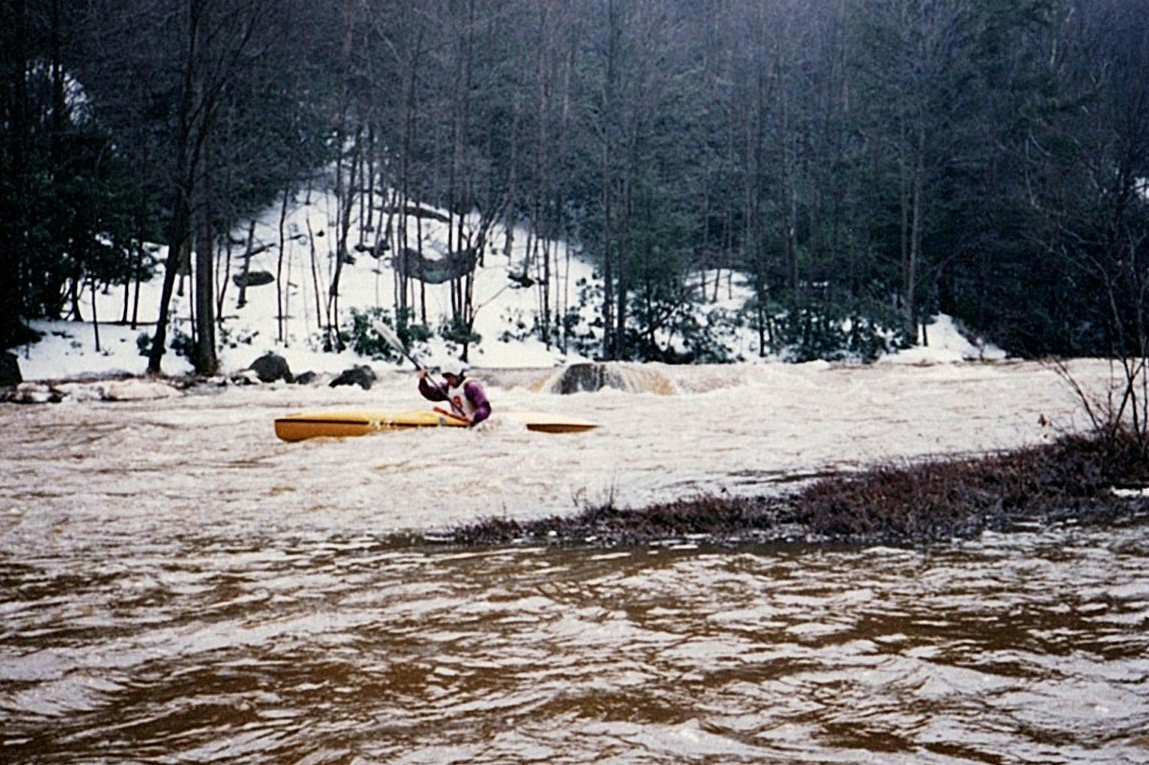
Brad Nelson competing in the Red Moshannon Downriver Race.

Moshannon Creek joins the West Branch Susquehanna River, opposite an area known as Miller's Landing, approximately 3.4 miles (5.5 km) upstream of Karthaus.

== Tributaries ==
- Ames Run
- Sevenmile Run
- Black Moshannon Creek
- Crawford Run
- Weber Run
- Browns Run
- Laurel Run
- Potter Run
- Tark Hill Run
- Six Mile Run
- Black Bear Run
- Sulphur Run
- Hawk Run
- Onemile Run
- Emigh Run
- Cold Stream
- Laurel Run
- Big Run
- Shimel Run
- Beaver Run
- Bear Run
- Mountain Branch
- Whiteside Run
- Roup Run
- Wilson Run

== See also ==
- List of rivers of Pennsylvania
