= Camel (disambiguation) =

A camel is a hoofed mammal.

Camel or Camels may also refer to:

== People ==
- Camel Meriem (born 1979), French footballer
- Georg Joseph Kamel (1661–1706), spelled Jorge Camel in Spanish, Jesuit missionary, pharmacist and naturalist
- Lucki, American rapper and record producer born Lucki Camel Jr. in 1996
- Marvin Camel (born 1951), WBC and IBF world cruiserweight boxing champion
- The Camel, nickname of Murray Humphreys (1899–1965), American mobster
- The Camel, nickname of Hugh Trenchard, 1st Viscount Trenchard (1873–1956), Marshal of the Royal Air Force

== Places ==
- River Camel, a river in Cornwall, United Kingdom
- Camel Nunataks, two rock nunataks in Antarctica
- Camel Rock (disambiguation), several places

== Military ==
- Sopwith Camel, a First World War fighter aircraft
- HMS Camel, seven ships of Britain's Royal Navy
- USS Camel, two ships of the US Navy
- Project Camel, work done by the California Institute of Technology in support of the Manhattan Project during World War II

== Transportation ==
See Military section above for military transports

- Sproule-Ivanoff Camel, a one-off 1930s British glider
- Tupolev Tu-104, NATO reporting name Camel, a Soviet retired airliner
- SS Camel (1870), a cargo ship – see List of ships built by Harland & Wolff (1859–1929)
- Camel, a type of steam locomotive
- Camel, a South Devon Railway Buffalo class locomotive

== Computing ==
- Apache Camel, a Java-based integration framework
- Customized Applications for Mobile networks Enhanced Logic, a set of mobile telephone network standards

== Entertainment ==
- Camel (band), an English progressive rock band formed in 1971
  - Camel (album), their first (1973) studio album
- The Camel (album), a 1964 album by Idrees Sulieman
- "The Camel" (Parks & Recreation), an episode of the television show Parks and Recreation
- The Camels, a 1988 Italian comedy film

== Sports ==
- Camel spin, a figure skating move
- Wadebridge Camels, a rugby union team in Cornwall, United Kingdom
- Camel Trophy, a rally competition
- Camel Cup, an annual camel racing festival held in Australia
- Campbell Fighting Camels and Lady Camels, the sports teams of Campbell University
- Connecticut College Camels, the sports teams of Connecticut College
- Hapoel Be'er Sheva F.C., an Israeli football club nicknamed "The Camels"
- Camel (horse), an English thoroughbred racehorse

== Other uses ==
- Camel (chess), a fairy chess piece
- Camel (cigarette), an American cigarette brand manufactured by R.J. Reynolds Tobacco Company
- Camel (color)
- CAMELS rating system, a safety rating system for banks, co ops, and credit unions
- Ship camel, an external flotation tank to lift ships
- Camel case, the practice of writing phrases without spaces or punctuation and with capitalized words
- Camel, a business term for a startup company that can survive unfavourable conditions with minimal resource expenditure

== See also ==
- Battle of the Camel, fought at Basra in 656
- Tuoshan, translated as "Camel Mountain", a mountain in Shandong Province, China
- CAML (disambiguation)
