= Camelback =

Camelback may refer to:

- riding atop a camel
- Camelback, a variation of shotgun house with a second floor in the rear of the house.
- Camelback (roller coaster element), a hump-shaped hill element found on roller coasters
- CamelBackCapitalization, a type of capitalization, generally known as CamelCase
- Camelback East, a district of Phoenix adjacent to the mountain
- Camelback High School
- Camelback locomotive, a type of steam locomotive with the cab mounted in the middle, astride the boiler
- Camelback Mountain in Phoenix, Arizona, and a road and numerous establishments in that area
  - Camelback Road
- Camelback Potential, a physics phenomenon
- Camelback Research Alliance Inc., an American equities research firm now known as Gradient Analytics, Inc.
- Camelback Mountain Resort in the Pocono Mountains in Pennsylvania
  - Camelback Mountain (Pennsylvania)
- CamelBak, a brand of water canteen worn as a backpack

== See also ==
- Back (disambiguation)
- Camel (disambiguation)
