= Camelback Mountain (disambiguation) =

Camelback Mountain is a mountain in Phoenix, Arizona, United States.

Camelback Mountain may also refer to:

- Camelback Mountain (Big Pocono), Pennsylvania
  - Camelback Mountain Resort
