= BUTLERBuilt =

Racing seat company

BUTLERBuilt Seats
- Type: Private
- Industry: Automotive
- Founded: 1981; 45 years ago in Concord, North Carolina, U.S.
- Founders: Brian Butler
- Headquarters: Concord, North Carolina, U.S.
- Products: Racing seats
- Parent: RJS Racing Equipment
- Website: www.butlerbuilt.net

Butlerbuilt Seats, officially styled as BUTLERBuilt Seats, is a seating company based in Charlotte, North Carolina, founded in 1981. The company currently offers a variety of seats including seats for all NASCAR National Series as well as both Asphalt and Dirt Late Models, Sprint Cars, and Midget car seats.

== History ==
The company was founded in 1981 by Brian Butler, building custom seats primarily for cars driven in the then NASCAR Winston Cup Series and NASCAR Late Model Sportsman Series, as well as for some other small short track racing applications.

In December 2019 the company was sold to RJS Racing Equipment after filing for bankruptcy on April 23, 2019.
