= List of exports of Poland =

Exports of Poland by product category (2019) Chemical products Transportation Machines Mineral products Plastics and rubbers Metals Foodstuffs Precious metals Textiles Instruments Animal products Vegetable products Paper goods Footwear and headwear Miscellaneous Stone and glass Wood products Animal and vegetable bi-products Animal hides Arts and antiques Weapons

The following is a list of the exports of Poland.

== List ==
Data is for 2012, in millions of United States dollars, as reported by The Observatory of Economic Complexity. Currently the top twenty exports are listed.

#	Product	Value
1	Vehicle parts	8,424
2	Cars	5,761
3	Seats	4,092
4	Refined Petroleum	3,860
5	Video Displays	3,714
6	Other Furniture	3,264
7	Computers	3,012
8	Passenger and Cargo Ships	2,781
9	Refined Copper	2,672
10	Combustion Engines	2,592
11	Insulated Wire	2,322
12	Rubber Tires	2,292
13	Packed Medicaments	2,264
14	Rolled Tobacco	2,049
15	Coke	1,891
16	Iron Structures	1,653
17	Delivery Trucks	1,619
18	Toilet Paper	1,592
19	Engine Parts	1,483
20	Telephones	1,430
