= PKS 0053−015 =

Radio galaxy in the constellation Cetus

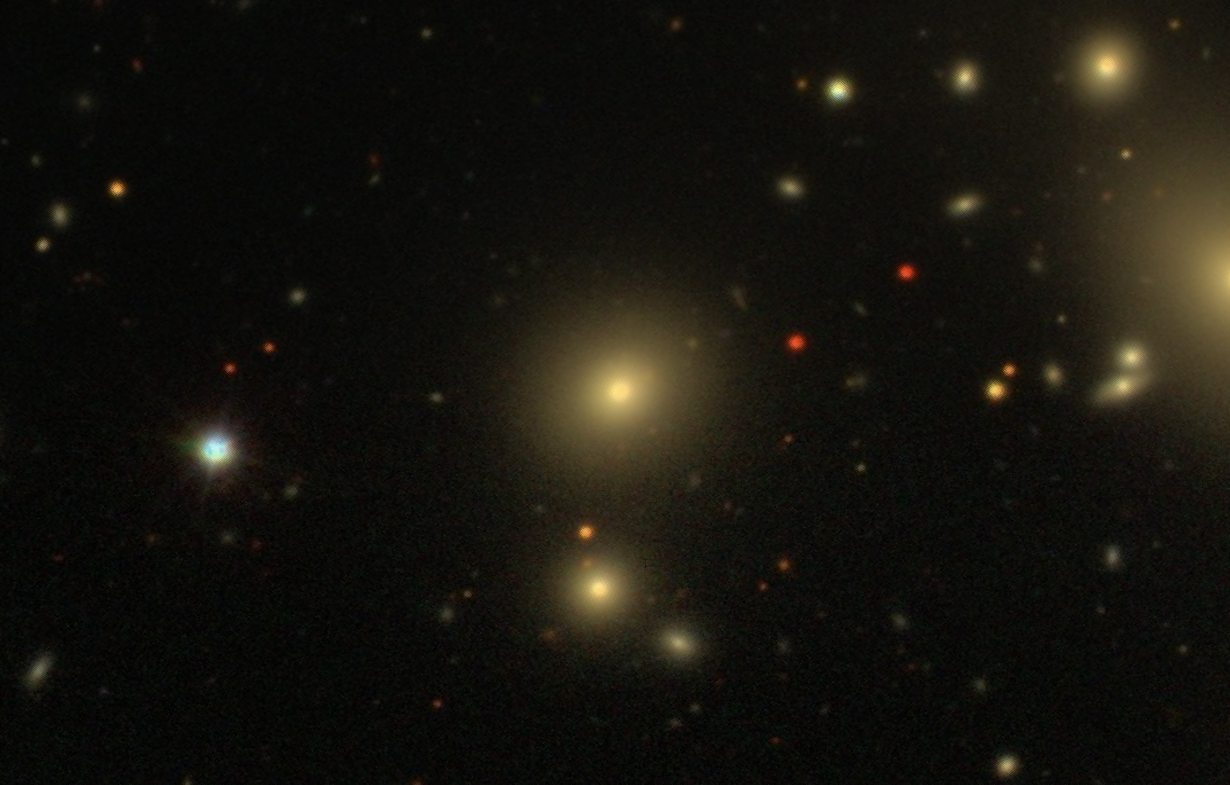
- SDSS image of PKS 0053−015

Observation data (J2000 epoch)
- Constellation: Cetus
- Right ascension: 00^{h} 56^{m} 25.59^{s}
- Declination: −01° 15′ 44.94″
- Redshift: 0.038230
- Heliocentric radial velocity: 11,461 km/s ± 3
- Distance: 515 Mly (158.00 Mpc)
- Group or cluster: Abell 119
- Apparent magnitude (V): 13.68

Characteristics
- Type: E/S0
- Size: ~200,000 ly (62 kpc) (estimated)

Other designations
- UGC 583, CGCG 384-038, GIN 013, PGC 3365, NSA 062154, PKS B0053-015, TXS 0053-015, OCARS 0053-015

PKS 0053−015 is a radio galaxy located in the constellation of Cetus. The redshift of the galaxy is (z) 0.038 and it was first discovered by astronomers conducting the Parkes Catalogue survey at the Parkes Observatory in December 1966. This galaxy is one of the two narrow-angle tail (NAT) radio galaxies alongside PKS 0053−016 to be members of the Abell 119 galaxy cluster. In the Uppsala General Catalogue, it is designated as UGC 583.

== Description ==
PKS 0053−015 is classified to be an elliptical galaxy. It is known to contain a narrow-angle tail source. When observed, it has two jets of different surface brightness that is found to roughly bend towards the direction of south. Further imaging at 1.4 GHz frequencies, also found the jets are found to have a short appearance with an orientation of northeast to southwest direction. Evidence also showed the northeast jet is shown as bending by around 90 degrees in the south to form a low surface brightness lobe, subsequently merging with the radio emission.

Radio imaging made at higher resolution at 4.9 GHz frequencies, found the southwest jet is described as well-collimated for around 20 arcseconds before widening up to form a lobe feature characterized by several wiggles and bends. The northeast jet is described as straight from the start, but becomes sharply bending by 90 degrees then forms a large lobe feature. Unlike the southwest jet, this jet is slightly more brighter and is found surrounded by a cocoon of low brightness. Evidence also found the surface brightness of this jet is found to decrease faster compared to the southwest jet. The radio core of the source is unresolved but it has a bright appearance. There is also evidence of fractional polarization of around four percent in the central nucleus, which it turn oscillates to around the range of between 10 and 35 percent along the two lobes. Studies published in 2017, has discovered there is a filament feature with a narrow flat radio spectrum, shown as coinciding together with the southwest jet.

The central supermassive black hole of the galaxy is estimated to be 8.98 solar masses based on a study published in December 2002. The total apparent R-band magnitude of the galaxy is estimated as -24.03.
