= CAML =

Caml is a dialect of the ML programming language.

CAML may also refer to:

- Calcium modulating ligand
- Canadian Association of Music Libraries, Archives and Documentation Centres
- Census of Antarctic Marine Life, a field project of the Census of Marine Life
- Collaborative Application Markup Language

== See also ==
- Camel (disambiguation)
- OCaml
