= Camelbeach Waterpark =

Water park in Tannersville, Pennsylvania

Camelbeach Outdoor Waterpark
- Interactive map of Camelbeach Outdoor Waterpark
- Slogan: "PA's biggest outdoor waterpark!"
- Location: Tannersville, Pennsylvania, USA
- Coordinates: 41°03′09″N 75°21′13″W
- Owner: Camelback Mountain Resort
- Operated by: EPR Properties
- Opened: 1998
- Operating season: Memorial Day to Labor Day
- Status: Operating
- Area: 30 acres
- Website: www.camelbeach.com

Camelbeach Outdoor Waterpark is a water park located in the Poconos in Tannersville, Pennsylvania at Big Pocono State Park. Opened in 1998, it is the summer operation for Camelback Mountain Resort, which is a skiing and snowboard resort during the winter.

== Attractions ==
Camelbeach contains over 37 waterslides as well as many other attractions.

=== Dry attractions ===
- During the summer the ski lift, called the Black Bear 6 is still open. It allows guests to observe wildlife as they ascend the mountain.

=== Water attractions ===
- The Blue Nile Adventure River is Camelbeach's lazy river. Riders can choose from single and double-rider tubes. It opened with the park in 1998.
- The Olympic Pool is a full-size swimming pool. It opened with the park in 1998.
- Twister: A green tube slide which features some enclosed sections and some open sections, with one of the enclosed sections ending with a water curtain to soak riders. It opened with the park in 1998.
- Midnight Run : A black tube slide which is fully enclosed, and features small holes in the roof of the track to provide a small amount of light to the riders. It opened with the park in 1998.
- Riptide : A yellow (originally white) tube slide which is fully open and features many twists and turns, including two spirals. It opened with the park in 1998.
- Sidewinder: A red tube slide which is fully open and, as the name suggests, snakes back and forth down the mountain and also features a spiral. It opened with the park in 1998.
- The Titan is an eight-story tall family raft slide that allows up to four people per raft to ride down it. The Titan has nine banked curves with an added lip to keep the raft from going over the side. It opened in 2000.
- The Kahuna Lagoon is a wave pool which can produce waves up to six feet high. It opened in 2001.
- Kahuna Cove is a splash pad, adjacent to the Kahuna Lagoon Wave Pool. It features sprinklers, water spouts, and more. It opened in 2001.
- The Vortex and Spin Cycle are two bowl water slides. Spin Cycle is a tube slide which ends with a chute, while Vortex is a body slide and ends with a drop into a 6 1/2-foot-deep (2.0 m) pool. Both slides opened in 2002.
- Triple Venom is a series of three separate speed water slides, each over six stories tall. It opened in 2003. The slides are Serpent, a multicolored body slide which is fully open, allowing riders to experience air time three times while plunging down four steep drops; Viper, a translucent blue body slide which is fully enclosed except for an open final drop; and Cobra, a red body slide which is fully enclosed in total darkness.
- Flowrider is a surfing simulator which allows riders to ride waves while lying down or standing up on a surfboard. It opened in 2006.
- Pharaoh's Phortress is a family water play structure that features 8 waterslides, a four-story-high tipping bucket, fountains, spray guns, and more. It opened in 2008.
- Dune Runner is a family raft slide where riders slide down three drops. This ride allows riders to experience air time on the last drop. It opened in 2011.
- Sandstorm is a family raft slide where riders slide down into two funnels, sending the rafts oscillating from side to side. It opened along with Dune Runner in 2011.
- Mummy's Oasis is a smaller version of the "Pharaoh's Phortress". It features water cannons, geysers, a two-story-high tipping bucket, and more. It opened in 2016.
- High Noon Typhoon is a ProSlide Tornado. The ride features a six-story funnel during which riders, seated in four-person rafts, swing from side to side. The ride recently opened in 2018.
- Rival Racer is an eight-lane mat slide where the participants race each other through twisting enclosed tubes to the finish line at the bottom of the mountain. It replaced and is the modern successor to the Checkered Flag Challenge. It opened summer 2023.

==== Former rides and attractions ====
- The Bumper Boats were an attraction which allowed riders to compete against each other in gasoline-powered bumper boats in a traditional bumper-cars style battle. The area has not been used for anything since its closure, but the queue now features beach volleyball. (2001-2010)
- Camel Cove was a family water play structure that featured several play structures, including a large bucket similar to the ones found at Kahuna Cove and Pharaoh's Phortress. The area now features the "Mummy's Oasis". (1998-2015)
- Mini Golf was an 18-hole miniature golf course. The area now features the "Pharaoh's Phortress". (1998-2005)
- The Mat Slides were two slides where riders used foam mats to slip down the waterslide. One had to be under 60 inches in height, and weigh less than 140 pounds to experience these slides. (1998-2018)
- Checkered Flag Challenge was an eight-lane mat slide in which the participants would race each other down the slide to finish in first place, and to achieve the best time. It included a timing system which would announce the winner. (2004-2021)

== Awards and accolades ==
Camelbeach has been awarded by several national publications many times in its short lifespan. Aquatics International magazine awarded the park "Best Commercial Waterpark" for parks gathering 100,000 through 300,000 visitors each year. The International Amusement Parks Convention awarded Camelbeach one of three "Best Waterparks to Visit in 2005" awards. Camelbeach was also showcased in The Travel Channel's Waterparks 2005.
