= Big Pocono State Park =

State park in Pennsylvania, United States

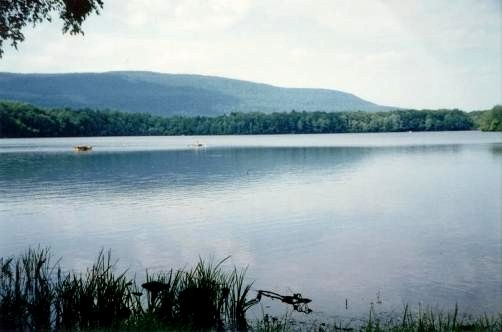
- Camelback Mountain Resort (site of Big Pocono State Park) from Mt. Spring Lake

- Location within Pennsylvania Location within the United States
- Interactive map of Big Pocono State Park
- Location: Monroe County, Pennsylvania, United States
- Coordinates: 41°02′39″N 75°22′09″W
- Area: 1,306 acres (529 ha)
- Elevation: 1,978 ft (603 m)
- Established: 1954
- Administrator: Pennsylvania Department of Conservation and Natural Resources
- Named for: Camelback Mountain
- Website: Official website
- Pennsylvania State Parks

Big Pocono State Park is a 1,305.6-acre (528.4 ha) Pennsylvania state park in Jackson and Pocono townships in Monroe County, Pennsylvania in Northeastern Pennsylvania. The park is located on Camelback Mountain and is maintained jointly by the Pennsylvania Department of Conservation and Natural Resources and Camelback Ski Corporation.

From the summit of the mountain, one has a view of vast portions of eastern Pennsylvania as well as parts of New Jersey and New York. A paved drive, 1.4 miles (2.3 km) in length, around the summit provides visitors with a view in all directions. Visitors can see the Delaware Water Gap from this location.

The park, except for Camelback Mountain Resort, closes for the winter seven days following the end of deer season in December and reopens as conditions permit in the spring.

== History ==
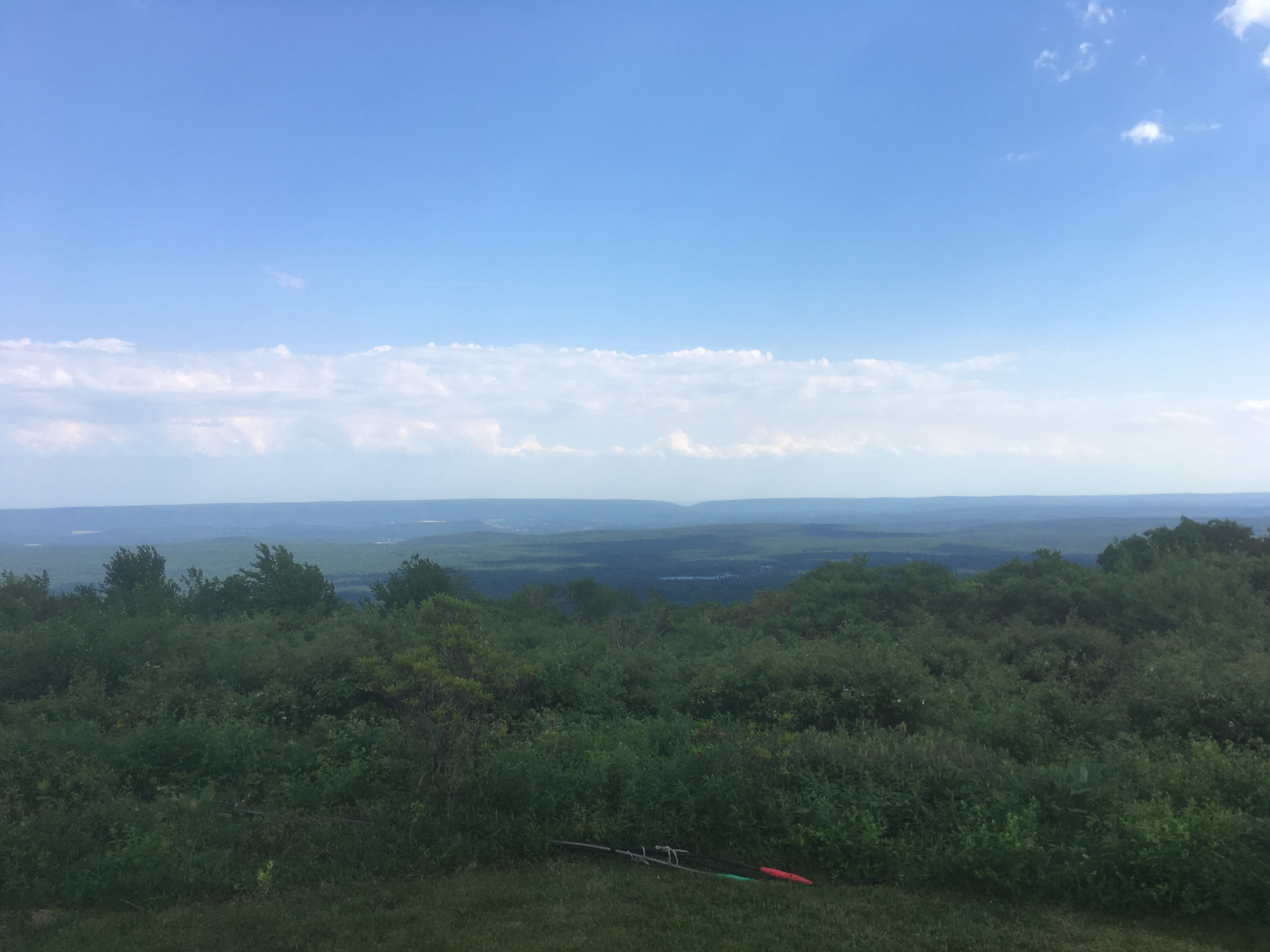
View south from Big Pocono State Park at Camelback Mountain

The land on which Big Pocono State Park is situated was owned by Henry S. Cattell at the turn of the 20th century. Knowing of the fondness that others in the area shared with him for the view that the summit provided, Cattell constructed a stone cabin there in 1908. For many years the cabin was left unlocked so that anyone who wished to use it as a shelter, could.

The Pennsylvania Game Commission purchased the land in 1928, 12 years following the death of Cattell. In 1950, the state leased a portion of the land on the north slope for commercial development. The company was later renamed the Camelback Ski Corporation, and the facility is now a major ski resort.

In 1953, the Pennsylvania Department of Forests and Waters (now the Department of Conservation and Natural Resources) acquired 1,306 acres (529 ha) of state game lands, which comprised the land that was purchased by the Game Commission, including the ski area lease, and the area immediately around the summit.

Big Pocono State Park opened to the public in 1954, following the construction of facilities and the scenic drive around the summit. The Cattell Cabin served as a park office and a nature museum for many years.

Although the museum no longer exists, the stone cabin still stands and is paramount only to the great views one can obtain by going to the different observation points provided by both DCNR and the Camelback Ski Corporation.

== Recreation ==
Big Pocono State Park offers a hiking trail system that consists of 7 miles (11 km) of interconnecting trails. The trails are of varying terrain and grade, and park officials caution inexperienced hikers to inquire at the park office before attempting the steep and rocky North Trail.

In addition to the hiking trails, there is also a horseback riding trail (3 miles (4.8 km)). The trailhead is near the entrance of the park, on the west end.

Three picnic areas with a total of 50 tables are situated within the park. The picnic area adjacent to Cattell Cabin has tables in an open setting, and the east and south picnic areas are in a wooded setting.

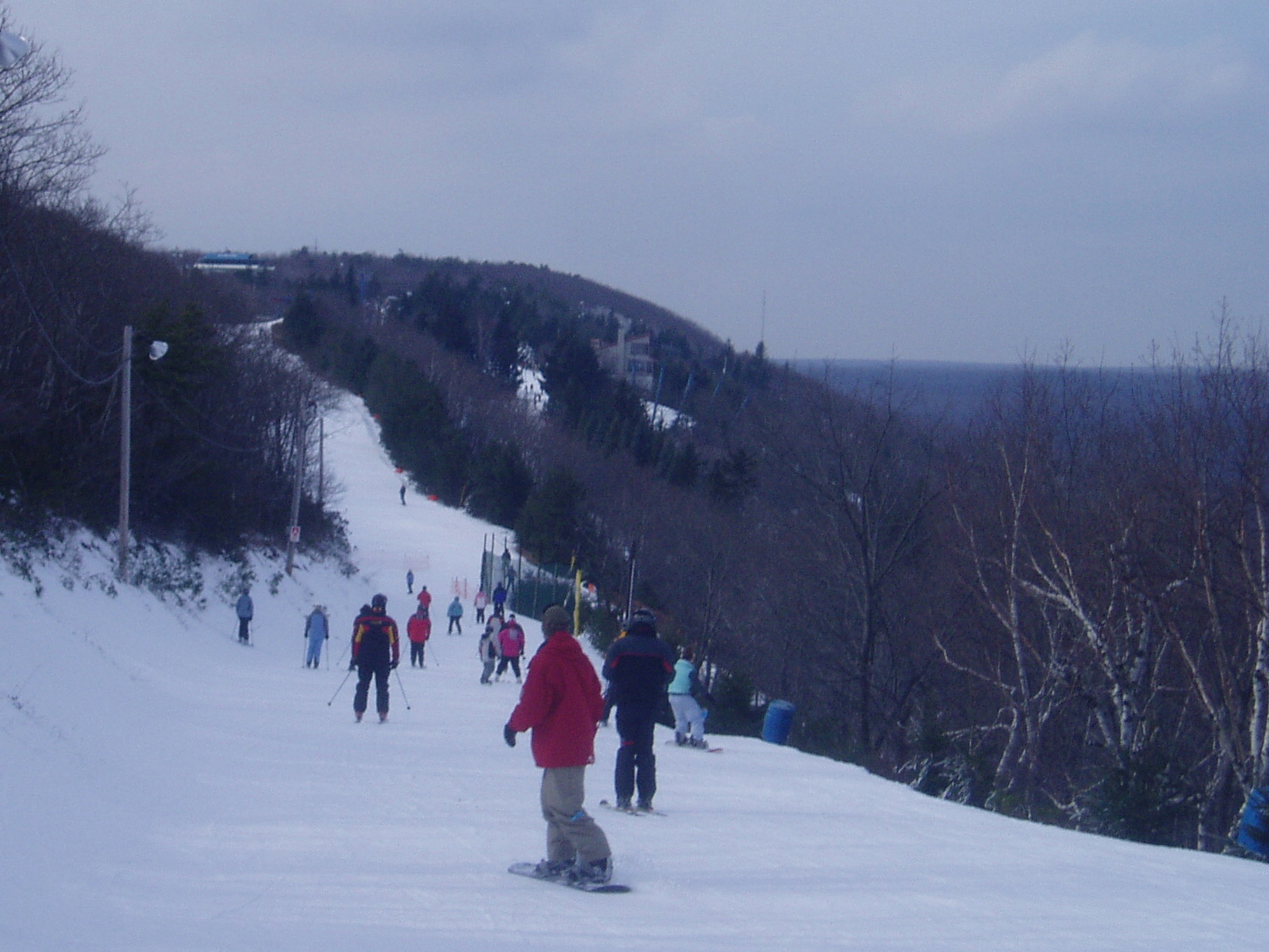
Skiing on Camelback Mountain

The Camelback Mountain Resort, located on the north slope, boasts the largest skiing, snowboarding and snowtubing facility in the Pocono Mountains. The facility has 33 trails, 13 lifts, two terrain parks, detachable quads, a halfpipe, night skiing and 100% snowmaking. The ski area also operates the Cameltop restaurant, which is located near the summit and is open from Memorial Day to Columbus Day. In the summertime, a waterpark named Camelbeach is operated on the grounds of Camelback, and this can be seen from Big Pocono.

Hunting is permitted in designated areas of the park during hunting seasons.

== Climate ==
According to the Trewartha climate classification system, Big Pocono State Park has a Temperate Continental climate (Dc) with warm summers (b), cold winters (o) and year-around precipitation (Dcbo). Dcbo climates are characterized by at least one month having an average mean temperature ≤ 32.0 °F (0.0 °C), four to seven months with an average mean temperature ≥ 50.0 °F (10.0 °C), all months with an average mean temperature < 72.0 °F (22.2 °C) and no significant precipitation difference between seasons. Although most summer days are comfortably humid in Big Pocono State Park, episodes of heat and high humidity can occur with heat index values > 93 °F (34 °C). Since 1981, the highest air temperature was 95.8 °F (35.4 °C) on July 22, 2011, and the highest daily average mean dew point was 70.8 °F (21.6 °C) on January 8, 2006. July is the peak month for thunderstorm activity which correlates with the average warmest month of the year. The average wettest month is September which correlates with tropical storm remnants during the peak of the Atlantic hurricane season. Since 1981, the wettest calendar day was 6.67 inches (169 mm) on September 30, 2010. During the winter months, the plant hardiness zone is 6a with an average annual extreme minimum air temperature of −9.5 °F (−23.1 °C). Since 1981, the coldest air temperature was −20.6 °F (−29.2 °C) on January 21, 1994. Episodes of extreme cold and wind can occur with wind chill values < −22 °F (−30 °C). The average snowiest month is January which correlates with the average coldest month of the year. Ice storms and large snowstorms depositing ≥ 12 inches (30 cm) of snow occur nearly every year, particularly during nor’easters from December through March.

Climate data for Big Pocono State Park, Elevation 1,909 ft (582 m), 1981-2010 normals, extremes 1981-2018
Month	Jan	Feb	Mar	Apr	May	Jun	Jul	Aug	Sep	Oct	Nov	Dec	Year
Record high °F (°C)	64.3 (17.9)	73.9 (23.3)	82.4 (28.0)	89.2 (31.8)	91.0 (32.8)	90.6 (32.6)	95.8 (35.4)	94.2 (34.6)	92.0 (33.3)	84.1 (28.9)	75.7 (24.3)	67.9 (19.9)	95.8 (35.4)
Mean daily maximum °F (°C)	31.0 (−0.6)	34.5 (1.4)	42.2 (5.7)	55.1 (12.8)	66.1 (18.9)	73.7 (23.2)	78.0 (25.6)	76.2 (24.6)	69.5 (20.8)	57.8 (14.3)	46.6 (8.1)	35.2 (1.8)	55.6 (13.1)
Daily mean °F (°C)	22.7 (−5.2)	25.7 (−3.5)	32.8 (0.4)	44.9 (7.2)	55.6 (13.1)	63.8 (17.7)	68.3 (20.2)	67.0 (19.4)	60.1 (15.6)	48.7 (9.3)	38.7 (3.7)	27.8 (−2.3)	46.4 (8.0)
Mean daily minimum °F (°C)	14.4 (−9.8)	16.9 (−8.4)	23.5 (−4.7)	34.8 (1.6)	45.1 (7.3)	53.9 (12.2)	58.7 (14.8)	57.7 (14.3)	50.7 (10.4)	39.6 (4.2)	30.9 (−0.6)	20.4 (−6.4)	37.3 (2.9)
Record low °F (°C)	−20.6 (−29.2)	−11.3 (−24.1)	−3.6 (−19.8)	11.8 (−11.2)	28.3 (−2.1)	34.0 (1.1)	39.5 (4.2)	35.5 (1.9)	29.1 (−1.6)	18.0 (−7.8)	1.5 (−16.9)	−12.0 (−24.4)	−20.6 (−29.2)
Average precipitation inches (mm)	3.95 (100)	3.34 (85)	3.96 (101)	4.67 (119)	4.79 (122)	5.25 (133)	4.44 (113)	4.50 (114)	5.47 (139)	5.27 (134)	4.44 (113)	4.51 (115)	54.59 (1,387)
Average snowfall inches (cm)	19.8 (50)	14.2 (36)	14.8 (38)	3.5 (8.9)	0.0 (0.0)	0.0 (0.0)	0.0 (0.0)	0.0 (0.0)	0.0 (0.0)	0.1 (0.25)	3.7 (9.4)	11.9 (30)	68.2 (173)
Average relative humidity (%)	72.5	67.7	64.4	61.6	64.2	73.3	73.2	76.3	77.1	74.3	73.0	75.0	71.1
Average dew point °F (°C)	15.2 (−9.3)	16.5 (−8.6)	22.1 (−5.5)	32.5 (0.3)	43.7 (6.5)	55.1 (12.8)	59.4 (15.2)	59.3 (15.2)	52.9 (11.6)	40.9 (4.9)	30.8 (−0.7)	20.9 (−6.2)	37.5 (3.1)
Source: PRISM

== Ecology ==
According to the A. W. Kuchler U.S. potential natural vegetation types, Big Pocono State Park would have a dominant vegetation type of Northern Hardwood (106) with a dominant vegetation form of Northern hardwood forest (26). The peak spring bloom typically occurs in early-May and peak fall color usually occurs in early-October. The plant hardiness zone is 6a with an average annual extreme minimum air temperature of −9.5 °F (−23.1 °C).
