= Seat =

Object for sitting on

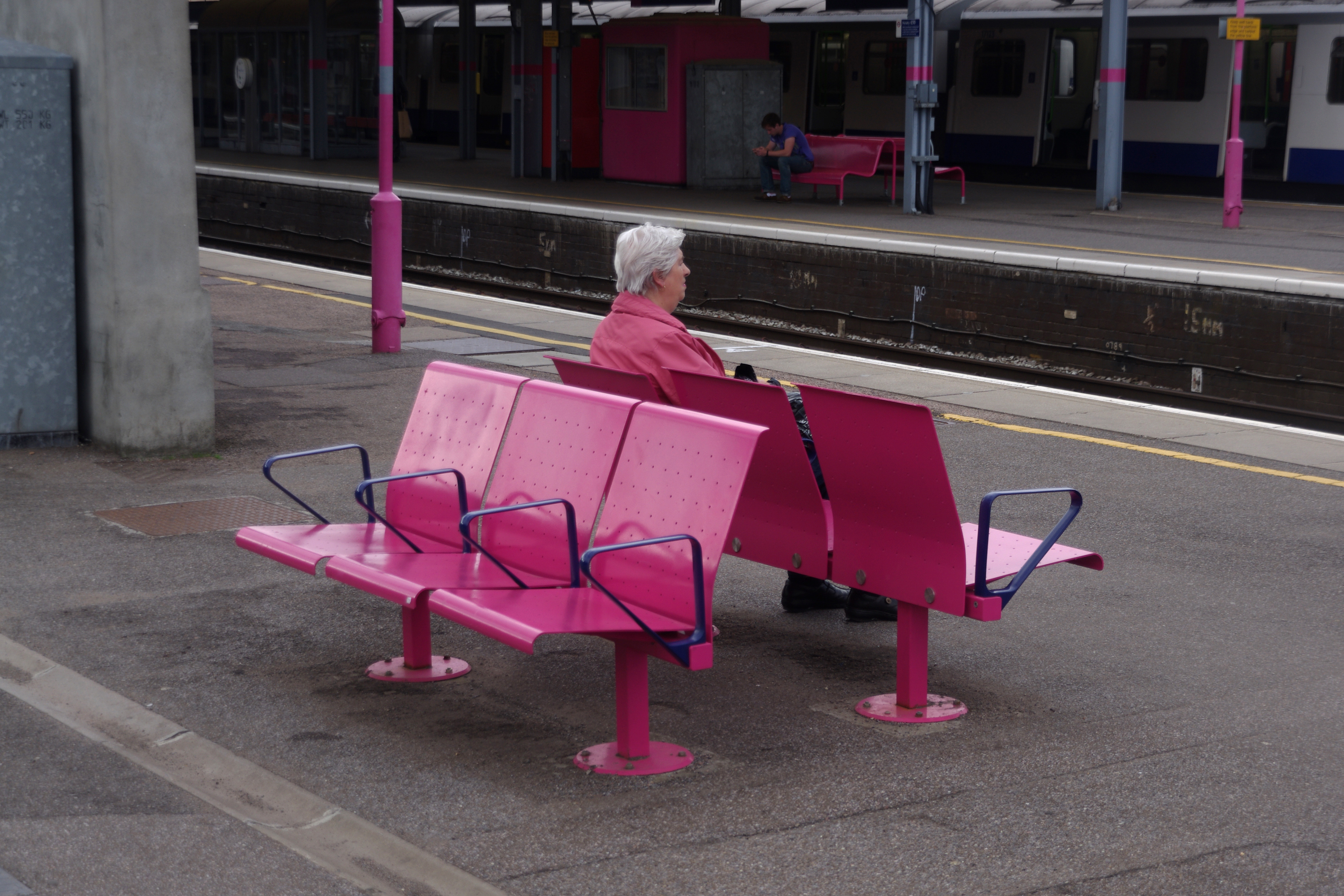
Seats at Upminster station

A seat is an object where an individual sits. The term may encompass additional features, such as back, armrest, head restraint but may also refer to concentrations of power in a wider sense (i.e "seat (legal entity)"). See disambiguation.

== Types of seat ==
The following are examples of different kinds of seat:

- Armchair, a chair equipped with armrests
- Airline seat, for passengers in an aircraft
- Bar stool, a high stool used in bars and many houses
- Bench, a long hard seat
- Bicycle seat, a saddle on a bicycle
- Car seat, a seat in an automobile
- Cathedra, a seat for a bishop located in a cathedral
- Chair, a seat with a back
- Loveseat, a shorter couch with 2 cushions
- Chaise longue, a soft chair with leg support
- Couch, a long soft seat
- Ejection seat, rescue seat in an aircraft
- Folding seat, or tip up seating for public spaces or transport.
- Hard seat
- Infant car seat, for a small child in a car
- Jump seat, auxiliary seat in a vehicle
- Office chair
- Pew, a long seat in a church, synagogue, or courtroom
- Racing seat, often referred to as full containment seats, typically a cocoon style seat, used for competition in Motorsports
- Saddle, a type of seat used on the backs of animals, bicycles, lap etc.
- Sliding seat, in a rowing boat
- Sofa, alternative name for couch
- Stool, a seat with no armrests or back
- Throne, a seat for a monarch
- Train seat, a seat used in trains
- Wheelchair, a movable seat intended for disabled people
- Toilet, used for defecating and urinating
- Camelback, used for back support on motorcycles
- Sofa bed, a couch or loveseat that extends out as a bed
- Backless Sofa, a couch without backrests

== Etymology ==
The word seat comes from Middle English sete, Old English gesete/geseten and/or sǣte seat, sittan to sit. Possibly related to or cognate with Old Norse sæti. The first known use of the word seat is in the 13th century.

== Ergonomics ==
For someone seated, the 'buttock popliteal' length is the horizontal distance from the rearmost part of the buttocks to the back of the lower leg. This anthropometric measurement is used to determine seat depth. Mass-produced chairs typically use a depth of 15 to 16 inches (38.1 to 40.6 cm).

== See also ==
- A Taxonomy of Office Chairs – Non-fiction work by Jonathan Olivares
- Chair
- List of chairs
- Right to sit
- Seating assignment
- Seating capacity
