= Jackson Township, Monroe County, Pennsylvania =

Township in Pennsylvania, US

- Township
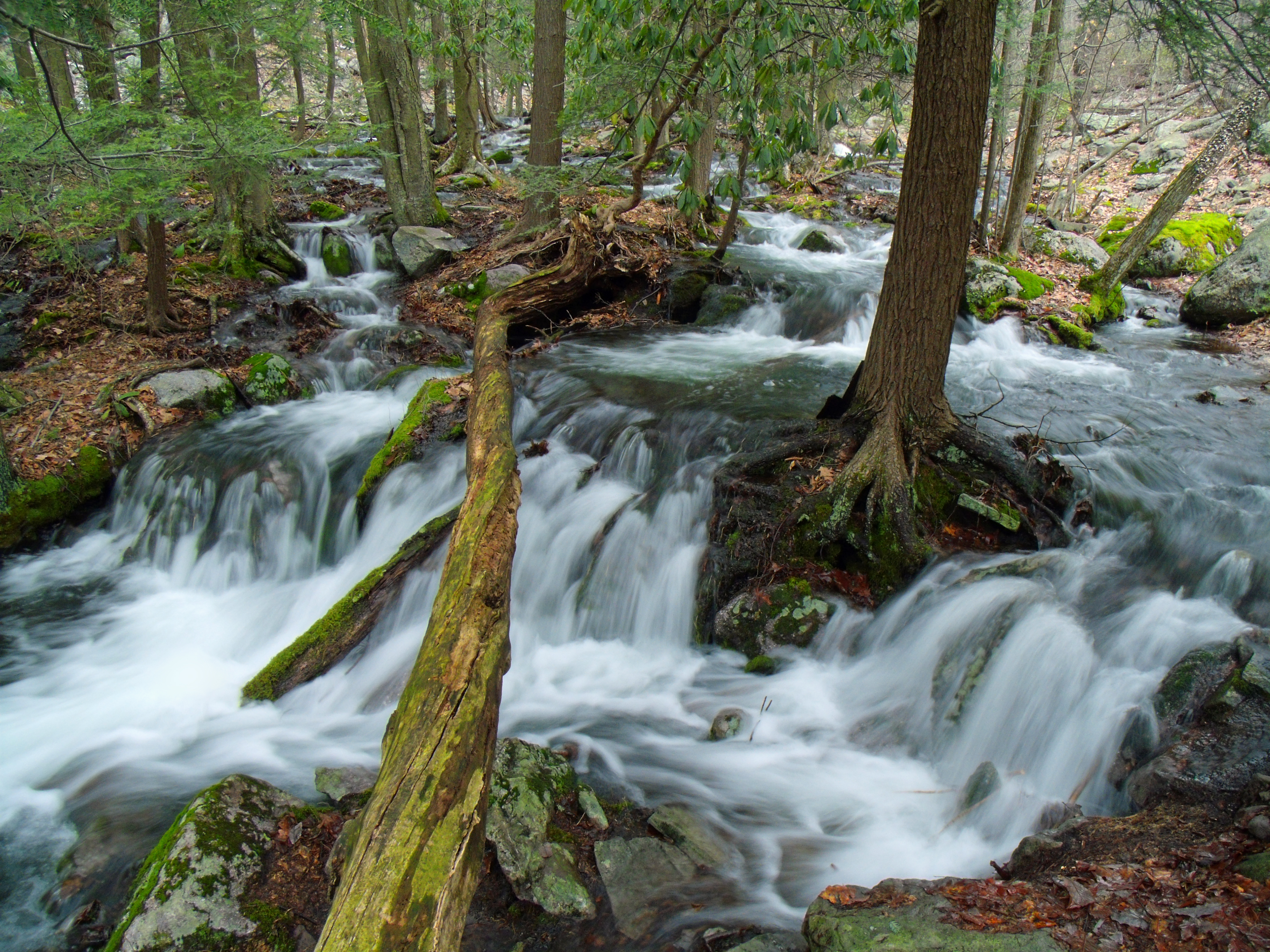
- Fall Creek

- Seal

- Location of Pennsylvania in the United States
- Coordinates: 40°59′00″N 75°19′59″W
- Country: United States
- State: Pennsylvania
- County: Monroe

Area
  - Total: 29.90 sq mi (77.44 km^{2})
  - Land: 29.40 sq mi (76.15 km^{2})
  - Water: 0.40 sq mi (1.04 km^{2})
- Elevation: 1,106 ft (337 m)

Population (2020)
  - Total: 6,578 ▼
  - Estimate (2022): 6,546
  - Density: 223.7/sq mi (86.38/km^{2})
- Time zone: UTC-5 (EST)
  - Summer (DST): UTC-4 (EDT)
- Area codes: 570, 272
- FIPS code: 42-089-37424
- Website: jacksontwp-pa.gov

Jackson Township is a township in Monroe County, Pennsylvania, United States. The population was 6,578 at the 2020 census. A portion of Big Pocono State Park, a Pennsylvania state park, is on Camelback Mountain in Jackson Township.

== Geography ==
According to the United States Census Bureau, the township has a total area of 29.8 square miles (77 km^{2}), of which 29.4 square miles (76 km^{2}) is land and 0.4 square miles (1.0 km^{2}) (1.48%) is water.

== Demographics ==
Historical population
Census	Pop.	Note	%±
2000	5,979		—
2010	7,033		17.6%
2020	6,578		−6.5%
2022 (est.)	6,546		−0.5%
U.S. Decennial Census

As of the census of 2020, there were 6,578 people and 2,348 households in the township. The population density was 220.7 inhabitants per square mile (85.2/km^{2}). There were 3,259 housing units at an average density of 109.4 per square mile (42.2/km^{2}). The racial makeup of the township was 73.29% White, 11.04% African American, 0.43% Native American, 1.66% Asian, 0.02% Pacific Islander, 4.48% from other races, and 9.09% from two or more races. Hispanic or Latino of any race were 11.95% of the population.

There were 2,348 households, out of which 62.6% were married couples living together, 17.7% had a female householder with no husband present, and 8.8% had a male householder with no wife present. The average household size was 2.80 and the average family size was 3.32.

In the township, the population was spread out, with 17.8% under the age of 18, and 19.2% who were 65 years of age or older. The median age was 46.9 years. As of March 2024, other age information is not available.

The median income for a household in the township was $56.659, and the median income for a family was $94,648. The per capita income for the township was $37.560. About 5.2% of the population was below the poverty line.

United States presidential election results for Jackson Township, Monroe County, Pennsylvania
Year	Republican		Democratic		Third party(ies)	
Year	No.	%	No.	%	No.	%
2024	2,079	55.15%	1,656	43.93%	35	0.93%
2020	1,978	53.53%	1,679	45.44%	38	1.03%
2016	1,625	53.45%	1,321	43.45%	94	3.09%
2012	1,350	47.75%	1,449	51.26%	28	0.99%
2008	1,421	47.10%	1,565	51.87%	31	1.03%
2004	1,122	54.23%	936	45.24%	11	0.53%
2000	1,169	52.35%	976	43.71%	88	3.94%

== Climate ==
According to the Trewartha climate classification system, Jackson Township has a Temperate Continental climate (Dc) with warm summers (b), cold winters (o) and year-around precipitation (Dcbo). Dcbo climates are characterized by at least one month having an average mean temperature ≤ 32.0 °F (0 °C), four to seven months with an average mean temperature ≥ 50.0 °F (10 °C), all months with an average mean temperature < 72.0 °F (22 °C) and no significant precipitation difference between seasons. Although most summer days are slightly humid in Jackson Township, episodes of heat and high humidity can occur with heat index values > 98 °F (37 °C). Since 1981, the highest air temperature was 97.5 °F (36 °C) on July 22, 2011, and the highest daily average mean dew point was 71.1 °F (22 °C) on August 1, 2006. July is the peak month for thunderstorm activity, which correlates with the average warmest month of the year. The average wettest month is September, which correlates with tropical storm remnants during the peak of the Atlantic hurricane season. Since 1981, the wettest calendar day was 6.51 inches (165 mm) on September 30, 2010. During the winter months, the plant hardiness zone is 6a, with an average annual extreme minimum air temperature of −9.7 °F (−23 °C). Since 1981, the coldest air temperature was −19.9 °F (−29 °C) on January 21, 1994. Episodes of extreme cold and wind can occur, with wind chill values < −22 °F (−30 °C). The average snowiest month is January, which correlates with the average coldest month of the year. Ice storms and large snowstorms depositing ≥ 12 inches (30 cm) of snow occur once every couple of years, particularly during nor’easters from December through March.

Climate data for Jackson Twp, Elevation 1030 ft (314 m), 1981-2010 normals, extremes 1981-2018
Month	Jan	Feb	Mar	Apr	May	Jun	Jul	Aug	Sep	Oct	Nov	Dec	Year
Record high °F (°C)	66.1 (18.9)	75.4 (24.1)	83.6 (28.7)	90.8 (32.7)	92.3 (33.5)	92.2 (33.4)	97.5 (36.4)	95.8 (35.4)	93.4 (34.1)	85.6 (29.8)	76.7 (24.8)	69.3 (20.7)	97.5 (36.4)
Mean daily maximum °F (°C)	34.8 (1.6)	38.3 (3.5)	46.1 (7.8)	59.1 (15.1)	69.8 (21.0)	77.7 (25.4)	81.7 (27.6)	80.1 (26.7)	73.2 (22.9)	61.5 (16.4)	50.1 (10.1)	38.9 (3.8)	59.4 (15.2)
Daily mean °F (°C)	26.0 (−3.3)	28.6 (−1.9)	35.9 (2.2)	47.3 (8.5)	57.9 (14.4)	66.3 (19.1)	70.4 (21.3)	68.9 (20.5)	62.0 (16.7)	50.3 (10.2)	40.6 (4.8)	30.4 (−0.9)	48.8 (9.3)
Mean daily minimum °F (°C)	17.2 (−8.2)	19.0 (−7.2)	25.6 (−3.6)	35.5 (1.9)	46.0 (7.8)	54.8 (12.7)	59.1 (15.1)	57.6 (14.2)	50.7 (10.4)	39.0 (3.9)	31.2 (−0.4)	21.9 (−5.6)	38.2 (3.4)
Record low °F (°C)	−19.9 (−28.8)	−10.2 (−23.4)	−2.1 (−18.9)	12.6 (−10.8)	29.0 (−1.7)	34.8 (1.6)	40.2 (4.6)	35.9 (2.2)	29.5 (−1.4)	18.3 (−7.6)	2.5 (−16.4)	−10.3 (−23.5)	−19.9 (−28.8)
Average precipitation inches (mm)	3.79 (96)	3.20 (81)	3.74 (95)	4.51 (115)	4.63 (118)	5.01 (127)	4.39 (112)	4.39 (112)	5.19 (132)	4.99 (127)	4.19 (106)	4.33 (110)	52.36 (1,330)
Average snowfall inches (cm)	15.0 (38)	10.8 (27)	11.2 (28)	2.7 (6.9)	0.0 (0.0)	0.0 (0.0)	0.0 (0.0)	0.0 (0.0)	0.0 (0.0)	0.1 (0.25)	2.8 (7.1)	9.0 (23)	51.5 (131)
Average relative humidity (%)	70.7	65.8	62.1	58.5	62.1	70.2	70.1	73.0	73.9	70.8	70.1	72.1	68.3
Average dew point °F (°C)	17.8 (−7.9)	18.6 (−7.4)	24.2 (−4.3)	33.5 (0.8)	45.0 (7.2)	56.3 (13.5)	60.2 (15.7)	59.9 (15.5)	53.6 (12.0)	41.2 (5.1)	31.6 (−0.2)	22.5 (−5.3)	38.8 (3.8)
Source: PRISM

== Transportation ==
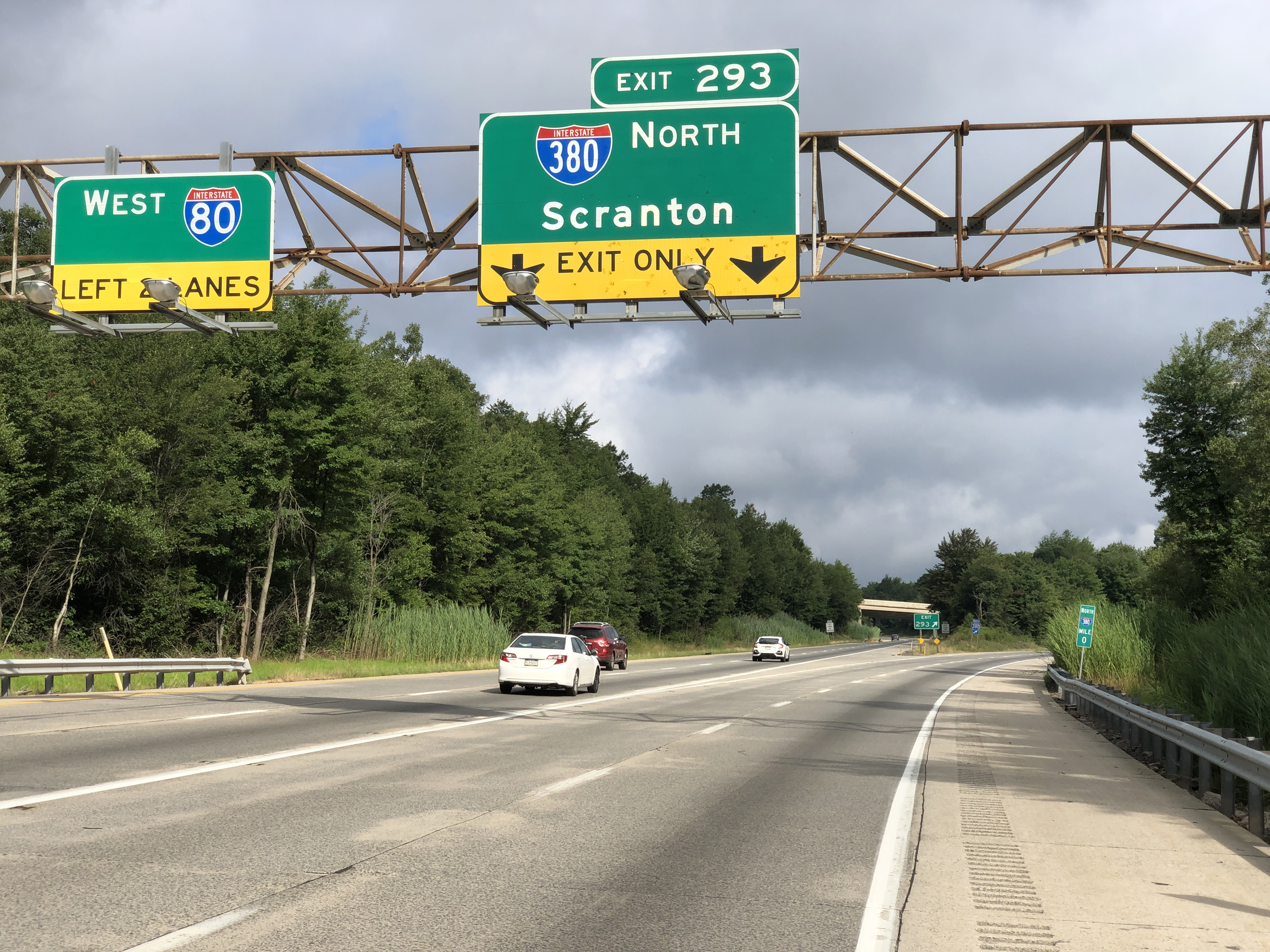
I-80 westbound at I-380 in Jackson Township

As of 2014, there were 84.69 miles (136.30 km) of public roads in Jackson Township, of which 24.23 miles (38.99 km) were maintained by the Pennsylvania Department of Transportation (PennDOT) and 60.46 miles (97.30 km) were maintained by the township.

Interstate 80 is the most prominent highway traversing Jackson Township. It follows an east-west alignment across the northern corner of the township, including part of the interchange with Interstate 380, but the nearest interchanges with local roads are in neighboring townships. Pennsylvania Routes 715 and 611 are the numbered highways providing direct local access to the township.

== Ecology ==
According to the A. W. Kuchler U.S. potential natural vegetation types, Jackson Township would have a dominant vegetation type of Appalachian Oak (104) with a dominant vegetation form of Eastern Hardwood Forest (25). The peak spring bloom typically occurs in late-April and peak fall color usually occurs in mid-October. The plant hardiness zone is 6a with an average annual extreme minimum air temperature of −9.7 °F (−23 °C).
