= Camel Rock =

Camel Rock may refer to:

- Camel Rock in the Chiricahua National Monument, Arizona
- Camel Rock formation at Tesuque Pueblo, New Mexico
- Camel Rocks (Kamelfelsen), a rock formation on the Königstein hill in Germany
- Camel Rock in Mykonos, Greece
