= Cocoon (club) =

German nightclub

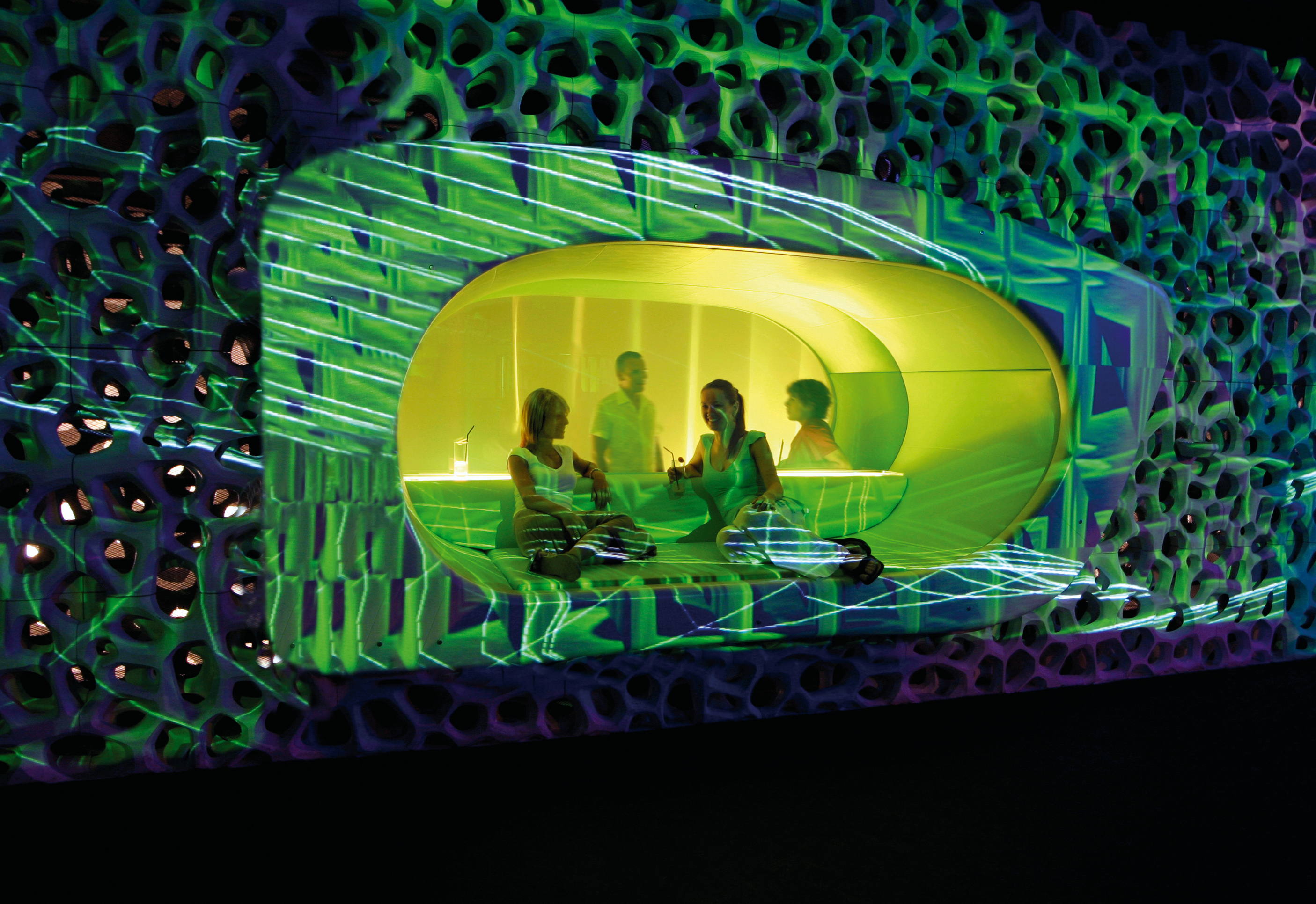
A public cocoon inside the Cocoon Club

Cocoon was a techno nightclub in Frankfurt am Main, Germany. It had space for 1,500 visitors and consisted of two restaurants, multiple lounge spaces, bars and small private and public cocoons made out of sofas which were placed inside the walls. It was closed on 30 November 2012. It was replaced by the club moon13 on the same location but under a different management.

== History ==
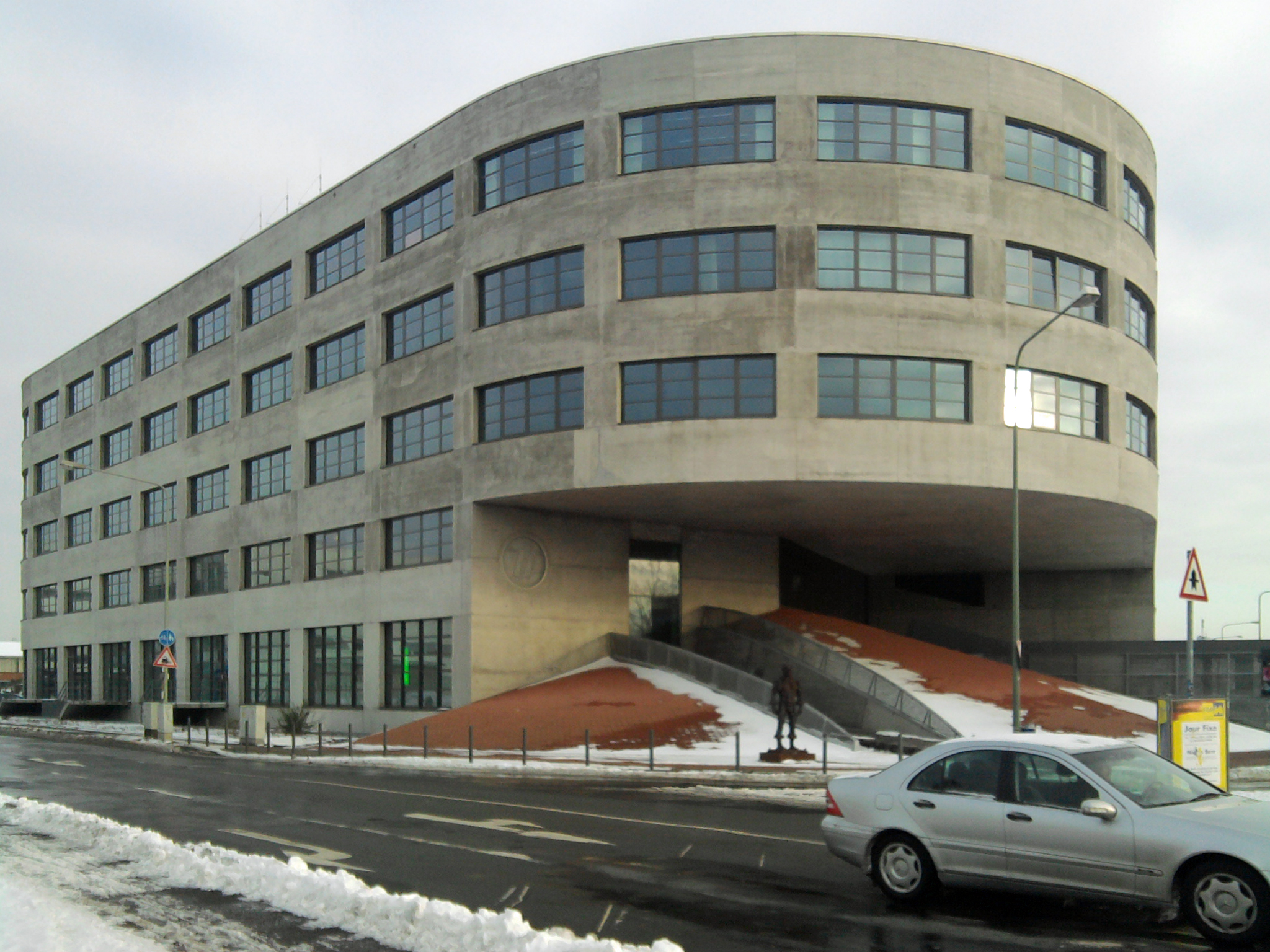
Exterior of the U.F.O. building

Cocoon was opened on 18 July 2004 inside a newly built concrete office building, named U.F.O. (Unbekannter Frankfurter Osten) constructed by Dietz Joppien Architekten in the industrial east of Frankfurt. It was the successor of the Omen club. The designer of the club interior was the company 3deluxe from Wiesbaden. It was an investment of several million Euros (10 million just for the design by the company 3deluxe). The sound system by Steve Dash cost 700.000 Euros.

== See also ==
- Cocoon Recordings
