= USS Camel =

USS Camel may refer to the following ships of the United States Navy:

- USS Camel (1813), was an armed sloop, purchased in April 1813 and outfitted at Philadelphia Navy Yard.
- USS Camel (IX-113), was a tanker launched 31 October 1943 as William H. Carruth by the California Shipbuilding Corporation.
