= Cocoon =

A cocoon is a protective silk case woven by some insects, especially moths, to protect a developing pupa, or by some spiders as an egg sac.

Cocoon may also refer to:

== Music ==
- Cocoon Recordings, a German record label
- Cocoon (band), a French band
- Cocoon (club), a techno club in Frankfurt am Main, Germany
- Cocoon (Meg & Dia album), 2011
- Cocoon (Pandelis Karayorgis album), 2013
- Cocoon (Chara album), 2012
- The Cocoon 2019 debut album of Richard Henshall
- Cocoon, an album by Yorico
- "Cocoon" (Anna Tsuchiya song)
- "Cocoon" (Björk song), 2001
- "Cocoon" (Milky Chance song), 2016
- "Cocoon" (Catfish and the Bottlemen song), 2014
- "Cocoon", a song by Bernard Butler from Friends and Lovers
- "Cocoon", a song by The Decemberists from Castaways and Cutouts
- "Cocoon", a song by Holly Humberstone from Paint My Bedroom Black
- "Cocoon", a song by Guster from Parachute
- "Cocoon", a song by Jack Johnson from On and On
- "Cocoon", a song by Migos
- "Cocoon", an instrumental by Timerider, the original theme music for the UK TV programme The Hit Man and Her

== Other uses ==
- Apache Cocoon, web development software
- Cocoon (film), a 1985 science fiction-fantasy film
  - Cocoon: The Return, 1988 sequel to Cocoon
- Cocoon (manga), by Machiko Kyō
- Cocoon (video game), a 2023 video game published by Annapurna Interactive
- Kakuna (Pokémon), a species of Pokémon, known as Cocoon in the original Japanese version
- "Cocoon", a short story by Greg Egan in his collection Luminous
- Cocoon, a fictional world in the video game Final Fantasy XIII
- "Cocoon" (Hawaii Five-O), an episode of 1968 TV series Hawaii Five-O
- "Ka ʻōwili ʻōka'i", an episode of 2010 TV series Hawaii Five-0 and remake of the 1968 episode whose alternative title is "Cocoon"
- Cocoon, a 1997 English translation of 1963 Marathi language novel Kosala by Bhalchandra Nemade

== See also ==
- Cocooning (disambiguation)
