= Sproule-Ivanoff Camel =

British single-seat glider, 1939

Camel

General information
- Type: Single-seat glider
- National origin: United Kingdom
- Manufacturer: Scott Light Aircraft
- Number built: 1

History
- First flight: 1939

The Sproule-Ivanoff Camel was a 1930s British single-seat medium performance glider designed by J.S Sproule and Alexander Ivanoff and built by Scott Light Aircraft of Dunstable, Bedfordshire.

== Design and development ==
At the end of 1937 Sproule and Ivanoff decided to design a glider that would be cheap, be easy to control and have a good speed range. It would also have wing-folding for quick assembly. The glider was a high wing strut-supported single-spar monoplane with no flaps of airbrakes and an enclosed single-seat cockpit. The Camel first flew at Ratcliffe in Leicestershire in 1939. In 1949 the Camel was registered to Alexander Ivanoff as G-ALLL.

== Accidents ==
On 19 August 1951 the Camel was destroyed in a fatal mid-air collision with another glider over Dunstable. The pilot, an instructor with the London Gliding Club, was killed when the Camel suddenly descended on top of an EoN Olympia glider. The pilot of the Olympia, from the South Downs Gliding Club, took evasive action when he saw the Camel descend; the glider lost four foot of wing tip but landed safely. The Camel did not have a certificate of airworthiness, which was not a compulsory requirement. The Deputy Coroner recorded a verdict of accidental death, saying "there was no evidence that either glider was anything but airworthy".

== Specifications ==
Data from VGC News

General characteristics

- Crew: 1
- Length: 17 ft 2 in (5.23 m)
- Wingspan: 37 ft 4 in (11.38 m)
- Wing area: 110 sq ft (10 m^{2})
- Aspect ratio: 12.7
- Airfoil: Göttingen 535 at root, Göttingen 389 at tip

Performance

- Rate of sink: 169 ft/min (0.86 m/s) minimum at 35 mph (56 km/h)
- Wing loading: 3.7 lb/sq ft (18 kg/m^{2})

== See also ==
Related lists

- List of gliders
