= HMS Camel =

Six ships of the Royal Navy have borne the name HMS Camel, after the camel:

- HMS Camel (1667) was a 6-gun fireship captured in 1667 and expended later that year.
- HMS Camel (1776) was a sixth rate, formerly the mercantile Yorkshire, launched in 1776 at Whitby. The Royal Navy purchased her in 1776, converted her to an armed transport in 1782–83, and sold her in 1784.
- HMS Camel (1788) was a 24-gun storeship, originally launched in 1782 as the 44-gun fifth rate HMS Mediator. She was converted to a storeship and renamed Camel in 1788, and was broken up in 1810.
- HMS Camel (1813) was a storeship built at Calcutta as the East Indiaman Severn. The Navy purchased her in 1813 and sold her in 1831 into mercantile service. She then made one voyage for the British East India Company. Her entry in the 1842 Lloyd's Register bears the notation "missing".
- HMS Camel (1855) was a mortar vessel launched in 1855. She was renamed MV14 later that year, and was converted into a crane lighter in 1871 and renamed YC6.
- HMS Camel (1856) was an Albacore-class wooden screw gunboat launched in 1856 and broken up in 1864.
