= Camelback Mountain (Big Pocono) =

Geographic feature in Pennsylvania, US

Coordinates: 41.0419°N 75.3458°W

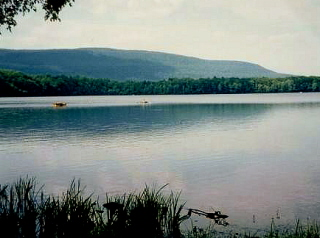
- Big Pocono from Spring Lake

Highest point
- Elevation: 2,133 ft (650 m)

Geography
- Location: Monroe County, Pennsylvania, U.S.
- Parent range: Appalachian Mountains, Pocono Mountains

Camelback Mountain or Big Pocono is a conspicuous geographic feature on the Pocono Plateau. It is not a mountain, but rather a peninsular section of the Pocono Plateau, that when viewed from three sides, appears to be a mountain. The summit of Big Pocono "Mountain" is actually nearly level with land to the west and northwest, together comprising the top of the Glaciated Pocono Plateau, which is part of the larger Allegheny Plateau.

The Pocono Plateau, a distinctive geologic feature not to be confused with the larger Pocono Mountains, is a glaciated plateau formed during at least three glacial movements. As glaciers moved south from Canada, they scraped flat what is now the plateau. The Glacier Movements also created other distinctive features of this region, including peat bogs and swamps, which resulted when glacial scour produced un-drained scars on the plateau's surface. Examples of depressions created by glacial scour include Deep Lake and Wolf Swamp just west of Big Pocono State Park.

Big Pocono's distinctive shape, hence its nickname, and 1,000 ft prominence above land to the south, east, and north makes it plainly visible from the east and south. However, this feature is not apparent when viewed from the west.

Big Pocono is home to a ski area called Camelback Mountain Resort and Big Pocono State Park. The park lies on the summit of the mountain, where there are hiking trails and picnic tables. Views from the summit are extensive. On a clear day the Delaware Water Gap, High Point (New Jersey) and the Catskill Mountains in New York State can be seen.
