= Camelback Mountain Resort =

Ski and snowboard resort in Pennsylvania

Camelback Resort
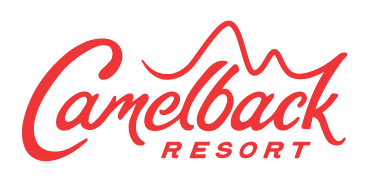

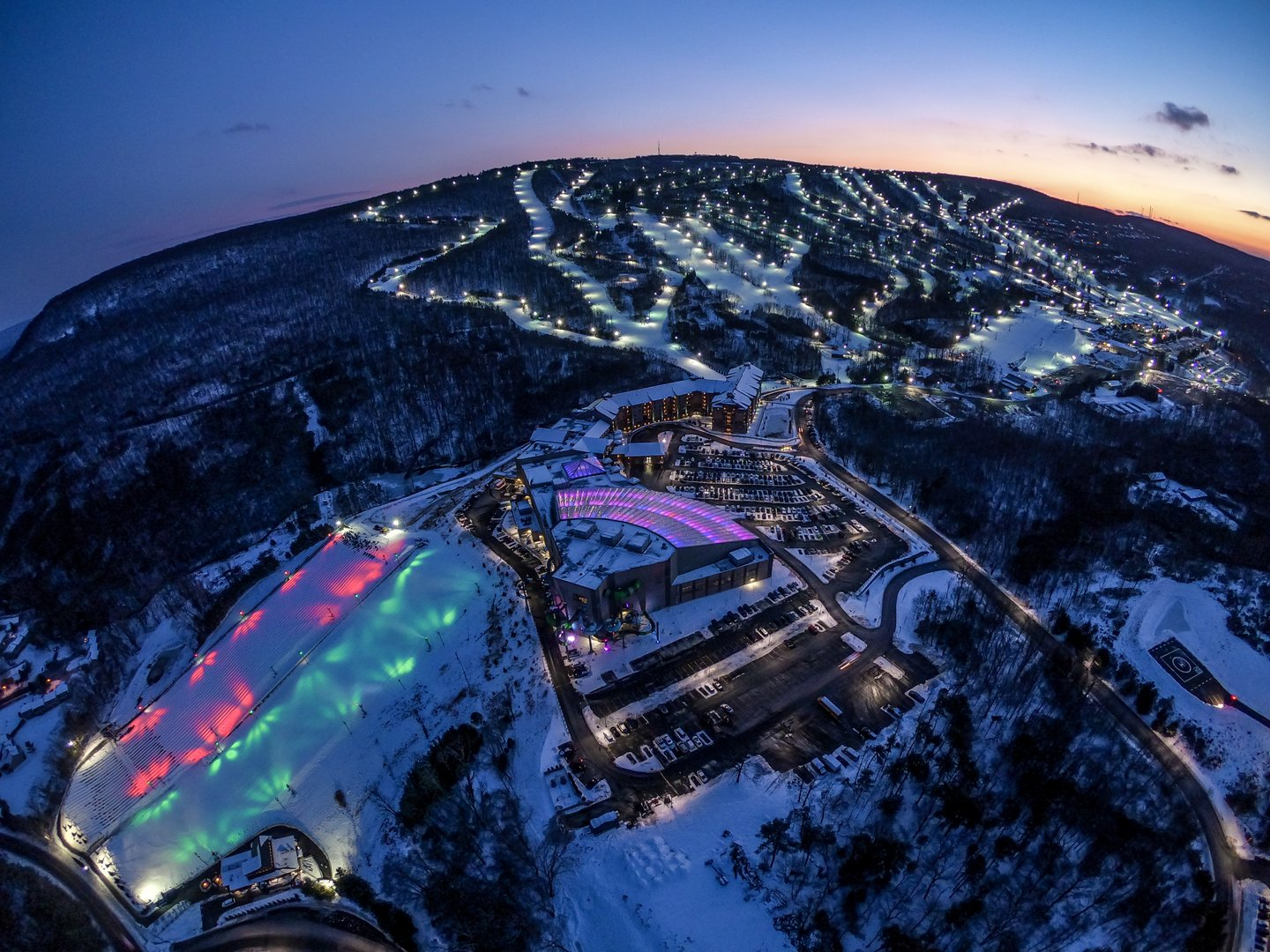
- Camelback Resort in Winter
- Interactive map of Camelback Resort
- Location: Pocono Township / Jackson Township, Monroe County, near Tannersville, Pennsylvania, USA
- Nearest city: Scranton
- Coordinates: 41°03′05″N 75°21′19″W
- Vertical: 800 feet (240 m)
- Top elevation: 2,133 feet (650 m)
- Skiable area: 166 acres (0.67 km^{2})
- Trails: 35 trails 39% Beginner; 26% More Difficult; 26% Most Difficult; 9% Expert
- Longest run: "Nile Mile" – 4,646 feet (1,416 m)
- Lift system: 2 high-speed detachable quad chairlifts, 3 triple chairlifts, 5 double chairlifts, 4 Surface lifts, 2 Tubing Surface Lifts
- Terrain parks: 2
- Snowfall: 50 in/yr (1.27 m/yr)
- Website: www.camelbackresort.com

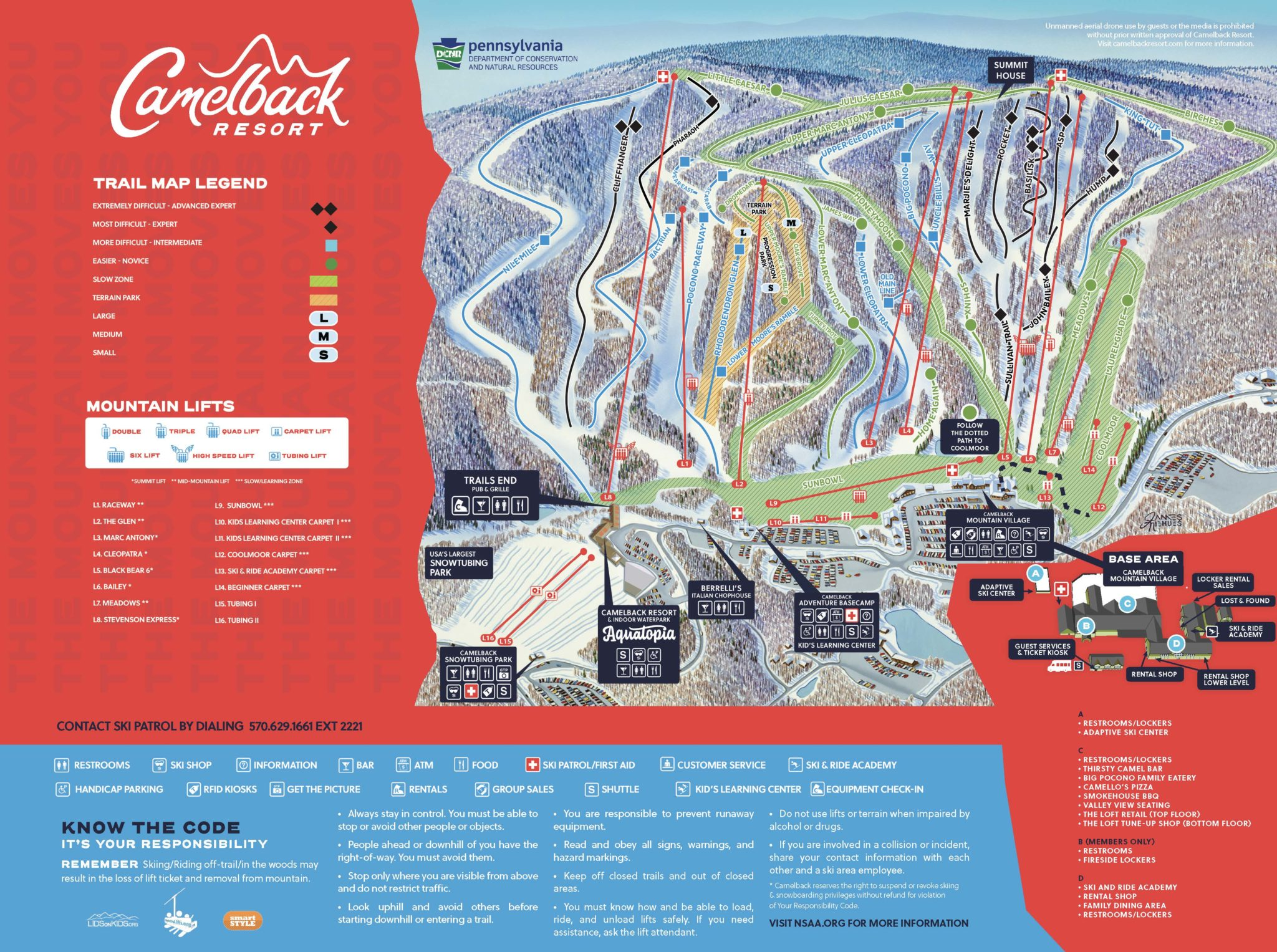
Camelback Resort's skiing and snowtubing trail map

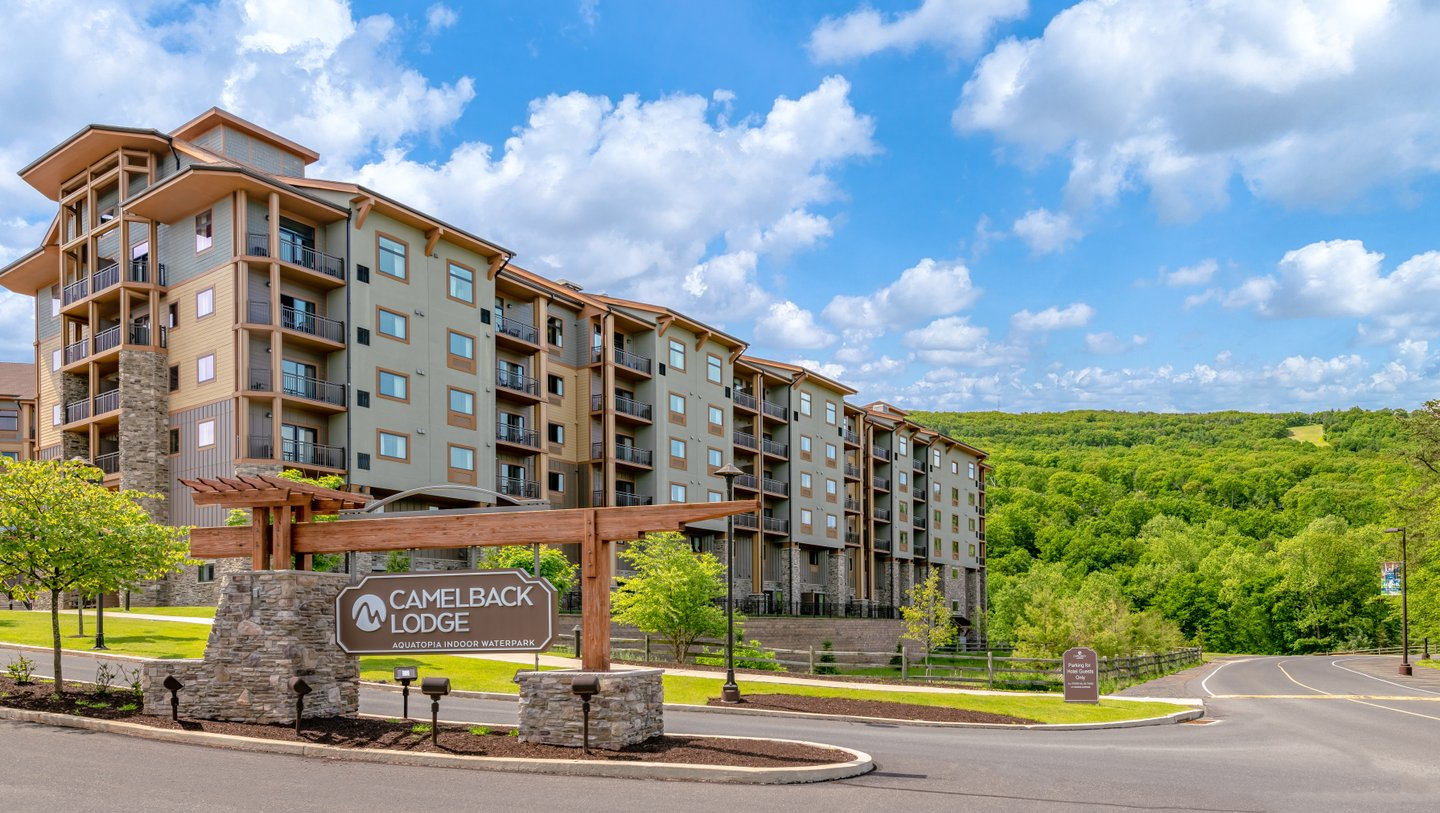
Camelback Resort's hotel

Camelback Resort is a four season resort located in Monroe County, Pennsylvania in the Pocono Mountains in Northeastern Pennsylvania. The resort opened in December 1963. It is the largest ski resort in the Poconos.

== History and features ==
In the 1950s, when developers were working to expand the original solitary ski run, they negotiated with the then Pennsylvania Department of Environmental Resources for permission to use a small portion of the state park for the ski area in exchange for $1 a year and the obligation to maintain the entire park.

Camelback Mountain reaches an elevation of 2,133 feet (650 m). There are 166 acres (67 hectares) of skiing & snowboarding terrain. The resort has a total of 39 slopes; the longest is the Nile Mile, at .88 miles. It features a vertical drop of 800 ft (244 m), two terrain parks, 16 lifts, including a high speed detachable chairlifts the Stevenson Express, and the new Black Bear 6 lift. The mountain summit receives an average of 50 in (127 cm) of snowfall each winter. It has snowmaking facilities on ski slopes, primarily relying on portable snow guns to create snow, and is 100% lit for night skiing.

Camelback has over 40 snow tubing lanes, making it the largest snow tubing park in the nation.

In May 2015, Camelback opened their 453 room hotel, which includes both suites and condos, and Aquatopia Indoor Waterpark. Additional attractions were added with Camelback Mountain Adventures, which features a 4500' mountain coaster and multiple ziplines.

Camelback Resort is 2 miles (3.2 km) from Pinemere Camp, and about 45 miles (72 km) north of Allentown, Pennsylvania.

Camelback has invested in their educational ski and snowboard programs. The resort uses the marketing phrase: "Learn Here, Learn Right".

== Waterparks ==
Camelback Mountain Resort operates two waterparks: Aquatopia Indoor Waterpark and Camelbeach Outdoor Waterpark, both located on the resort property in Tannersville, Pennsylvania.

=== Aquatopia Indoor Waterpark ===
Aquatopia Indoor Waterpark opened in 2015 and encompasses 125,000 square feet under a Texlon transparent roof, which allows natural sunlight while maintaining a constant indoor temperature of approximately 84 °F (29 °C) year-round. The facility includes 13 water slides, a wave pool, a lazy river, a multi-level play structure, a toddler splash zone, and a FlowRider surfing simulator. The park also features dining facilities and a swim-up bar.

Aquatopia has been recognized multiple times in USA Today's 10Best Readers' Choice Awards, ranking as the "#1 Indoor Waterpark in America" in 2015, 2018, 2019, and 2022. In 2022, a new virtual reality-enhanced slide, Mountain Mayhem, was introduced to the park.

=== Camelbeach Outdoor Waterpark ===
Camelbeach Mountain Waterpark is the largest outdoor waterpark in Pennsylvania, occupying approximately 37 acres. The park includes over 35 water slides, a 1,000-foot-long lazy river, a wave pool, and several family-oriented attractions. Camelbeach operates seasonally, generally from mid-June to early September.

In 2023, Camelbeach celebrated its 25th anniversary with the addition of Rival Racer, a multi-lane mat racing slide.

=== Camelback Mountain Adventures ===
Camelback Mountain Adventures offers 1,000 ft (300 m) of zipline, 4,000 ft (1,200 m) ZipFlyer, Mountain Segways, UTVs, and a 4500' Mountain Coaster. Camelback Mountain Adventures are open between spring and fall with the mountain coaster operating in the winter depending on snowfall.

== The ski trails ==
- The Birches, an Advanced Novice ski run
- King Tut, an Intermediate run
- The Hump, Expert
- The Asp
- The Rocket
- Marjie's Delight
- The Dromedary
- Big Pocono Run
- Upper Cleopatra
- Marc Anthony
- Julius Caesar
- Little Caesar
- Laurel Glade
- Coolmoor
- The Meadows
- John Bailey
- Sullivan's Trail
- The Sphinx
- Honeymoon Lane
- Home Again
- Lower Cleopatra
- Sunbowl
- Oak Grove
- Turkey Trot
- Upper Moore's Ramble
- Lower Moore's Ramble
- Pocono Raceway
- The Pharaoh
- The Bactrian
- Cliffhanger
- Near East
- The Nile Mile
- Basilisk

== Climate ==
According to the Trewartha climate classification system, Camelback Mountain Resort has a Temperate Continental climate (Dc) with warm summers (b), cold winters (o) and year-around precipitation (Dcbo). Dcbo climates are characterized by at least one month having an average mean temperature ≤ 32.0 °F (0.0 °C), four to seven months with an average mean temperature ≥ 50.0 °F (10.0 °C), all months with an average mean temperature < 72.0 °F (22.2 °C) and no significant precipitation difference between seasons. Although most summer days are comfortably humid at Camelback Mountain Resort, episodes of heat and high humidity can occur with heat index values > 93 °F (34 °C). Since 1981, the highest air temperature was 95.4 °F (35.2 °C) on 07/22/2011, and the highest daily average mean dew point was 70.7 °F (21.5 °C) on 08/01/2006. July is the peak month for thunderstorm activity which correlates with the average warmest month of the year. The wettest month of the year is September which correlates with tropical storm remnants during the peak of the Atlantic hurricane season. Since 1981, the wettest calendar day was 6.77 inches (172 mm) on 09/30/2010. During the winter months, the plant hardiness zone is 6a with an average annual extreme minimum air temperature of −9.4 °F (−23.0 °C). Since 1981, the coldest air temperature was −21.6 °F (−29.8 °C) on 01/21/1994. Episodes of extreme cold and wind can occur with wind chill values < −22 °F (−30 °C). The average snowiest month is January which correlates with the average coldest month of the year. Ice storms and large snowstorms depositing ≥ 12 inches (30 cm) of snow occur nearly every year, particularly during nor’easters from December through March.

Climate data for Camelback Mountain Resort, Elevation 1,883 ft (574 m), 1981-2010 normals, extremes 1981-2018
Month	Jan	Feb	Mar	Apr	May	Jun	Jul	Aug	Sep	Oct	Nov	Dec	Year
Record high °F (°C)	63.9 (17.7)	73.5 (23.1)	82.0 (27.8)	88.7 (31.5)	90.5 (32.5)	90.3 (32.4)	95.4 (35.2)	93.7 (34.3)	91.5 (33.1)	83.7 (28.7)	75.3 (24.1)	67.4 (19.7)	95.4 (35.2)
Mean daily maximum °F (°C)	31.1 (−0.5)	34.6 (1.4)	42.3 (5.7)	55.2 (12.9)	66.2 (19.0)	73.8 (23.2)	78.1 (25.6)	76.4 (24.7)	69.6 (20.9)	57.9 (14.4)	46.7 (8.2)	35.2 (1.8)	55.7 (13.2)
Daily mean °F (°C)	22.8 (−5.1)	25.8 (−3.4)	32.9 (0.5)	45.0 (7.2)	55.7 (13.2)	63.8 (17.7)	68.4 (20.2)	67.0 (19.4)	60.2 (15.7)	48.7 (9.3)	38.8 (3.8)	27.8 (−2.3)	46.5 (8.1)
Mean daily minimum °F (°C)	14.5 (−9.7)	17.0 (−8.3)	23.6 (−4.7)	34.8 (1.6)	45.1 (7.3)	53.8 (12.1)	58.7 (14.8)	57.7 (14.3)	50.8 (10.4)	39.6 (4.2)	30.9 (−0.6)	20.4 (−6.4)	37.3 (2.9)
Record low °F (°C)	−21.0 (−29.4)	−11.5 (−24.2)	−3.9 (−19.9)	11.6 (−11.3)	28.2 (−2.1)	33.8 (1.0)	39.3 (4.1)	35.5 (1.9)	29.0 (−1.7)	18.1 (−7.7)	1.2 (−17.1)	−12.3 (−24.6)	−21.0 (−29.4)
Average precipitation inches (mm)	3.97 (101)	3.36 (85)	4.03 (102)	4.68 (119)	4.81 (122)	5.32 (135)	4.48 (114)	4.51 (115)	5.52 (140)	5.32 (135)	4.48 (114)	4.54 (115)	55.02 (1,398)
Average snowfall inches (cm)	19.7 (50)	14.1 (36)	14.7 (37)	3.5 (8.9)	0.0 (0.0)	0.0 (0.0)	0.0 (0.0)	0.0 (0.0)	0.0 (0.0)	0.1 (0.25)	3.7 (9.4)	11.8 (30)	67.7 (172)
Average relative humidity (%)	72.9	67.4	64.7	61.6	64.0	73.3	73.2	76.3	77.1	74.3	73.0	75.3	71.1
Average dew point °F (°C)	15.4 (−9.2)	16.5 (−8.6)	22.3 (−5.4)	32.6 (0.3)	43.7 (6.5)	55.1 (12.8)	59.5 (15.3)	59.3 (15.2)	53.0 (11.7)	40.9 (4.9)	30.9 (−0.6)	21.0 (−6.1)	37.6 (3.1)
Source: PRISM

== Ecology ==
According to the A. W. Kuchler U.S. potential natural vegetation types, Camelback Mountain Resort would have transient dominant vegetation types of Northern Hardwood (106) and Appalachian Oak (104) with transient dominant vegetation forms of Northern hardwood forest (26) and Eastern Hardwood Forest (25). The peak spring bloom typically occurs in late-April and early-May and peak fall color usually occurs from early-to-mid October. The plant hardiness zone is 6a with an average annual extreme minimum air temperature of −9.4 °F (−23.0 °C).
